= Modern paganism in the United States =

Modern paganism within America

Modern paganism in the United States is represented by widely different movements and organizations. The largest modern pagan (also known as neo-pagan) religious movement is Wicca, followed by Neodruidism. Both of these religions or spiritual paths were introduced during the 1950s and 1960s from Great Britain. Germanic Neopaganism (also known as Heathenry) and Kemetism appeared in the US in the early 1970s. Hellenic Neopaganism appeared in the 1990s.

== History ==
Paganism first arose in the United Kingdom, with individuals like Charles Cardell and Gerald Gardner popularizing their nature-based beliefs. The spread of Neopaganism in the United States started in the 1960s with the introduction of Neodruidism (or Druidry) and Wicca from Great Britain. In the 1960s throughout the 1970s multiple variations of the craft (with a more centered structure) began sprouting up within the US. Neodruidism had begun in 1912 in the United States, but was more a fraternal order at that time. Germanic Neopaganism (or Heathenism) entered during the 1970s, developing into new denominations proper to the US, notably Theodism. In the same period the first Kemetic groups were formed, with the tradition itself originating in the US.

Wicca, introduced by Gerald Gardner in 1954, is the best known of the Neopagan movements. Charles Cardell, Gerald Gardner's rival during the 1950s Pagan Witchcraft Movement in England, actually coined the term "Wiccens" referring to Pagan Witches. Men were not the only founders of Pagan beliefs. Feminist based practices were on the rise during the 1960s and 1970s. The Pagan Organization, WITCH, an acronym for Women's International Terrorist Conspiracy from Hell, was formed during the 1960s. Another instance of such practices was Dianic Witchcraft, mothered by Zsuzsanna Budapest who published a 1979 piece tilted "The Holy Book of Women's Mysteries".

The 1980s and 1990s saw the emergence of a number of reconstructionist and other ethnic traditions. Hellenic Neopaganism (Dodekatheism), for example, has flourished since the 1990s, along with parallel developments in Greece. Hellenism was soon legally recognized as a 'known religion' in 2017 within Greece, when granted it more religions freedoms such as the freedom to open houses of worship and the freedom for clergy to officiate weddings.

== Organizations ==
Notable US Neopagan organizations:

- Wicca/Goddess/eclectic:
  - Cherry Hill Seminary, South Carolina, since 2001
  - Church of All Worlds, formed 1962, formerly the largest of all the pagan movements, which centres on worship of the earth-mother goddess
  - Circle Sanctuary, based in Wisconsin; largest Neo-Pagan organization in the US; its newsletter, Circle Network News, has some 15,000 subscribers (as of 1992)
  - Council of Magickal Arts, Texas
  - Covenant of the Goddess, since 1975
  - Feraferia, Hellenic-inspired goddess worship, established 1967 in southern California by Frederick M. Adams, as a continuation of his Fellowship of Hesperides founded in 1957, based in Nevada City
  - Feri Tradition, from ca. 1960
  - Reclaiming Tradition, an international community of women and men working to combine earth-based spirituality and political activism
- Roman Paganism
  - Nova Roma, since 1998
- Hellenic Neopaganism
  - Hellenion
- Druidry:
  - Ár nDraíocht Féin, since 1983
  - The Druid Order, since 1909
  - Order of Bards, Ovates and Druids, since 1964
  - Reformed Druids of North America, since 1963
  - Ancient Order of Druids in America, since 1874, when it was the Ancient Archaeological Order of Druids
- Heathenry (new religious movement):
  - Ásatrú Alliance, AA, since 1988, Arizona-based
  - The Ásatrú Community Inc. (2012) A nonprofit universalist Ásatrú organization located in Thousand Oaks, California.
  - Ásatrú Folk Assembly, AFA, California based, since 1994, re-activation of Stephen McNallen's 1974-1986 Asatru Free Assembly, formerly Viking Brotherhood, 1971-1974
  - Odinic Rite, ORV, since 1997
  - The Troth, since 1987
  - Wolves of Vinland
  - Fellowship of Northern Traditions, a group founded by Heathen YouTuber, Wisdom of Odin
- Kemetism
  - Ausar Auset Society, since 1973
  - Church of the Eternal Source, since 1970
  - Kemetic Orthodoxy, since 1988
- Nondenominational Pagan groups
  - Free Spirit Alliance
- American council of witches, pagans, and friends. A group working towards unity through friendship, help, information, news and issues.

== Festivals ==
- Heartland Pagan Festival, since 1986
- Pagan Spirit Gathering, since 1980
- Starwood Festival, since 1981
- Pan Pagan Festival, since 1976
- The Spiral Dance

== Demographics ==
Wiccan churches and other Neopagan institutions are becoming more common in the US. However, estimates of their numbers vary widely. The 2014 Pew Research Center's Religious Landscapes Survey included a subset of the New Age Spiritual Movement called "Pagan or Wiccan," reflecting that 3/4 of individuals identifying as New Age also identified as Pagan or Wiccan and placing Wiccans and Pagans at 0.3% of the total U.S. population or approximately 956,000 people of just over 1,275,000 individuals in the New Age movement. Most of the 1990s studies put the number of US Neopagans between 200,000 and 1 million (0.1% to 0.5% of the total population). A 2008 Pew Forum survey put "New Age" religious believers, including Neopagans, at about 1.2 million.

According to David Waldron (2005), roughly 10 million Wiccan-related books were sold in 2000 (up from 4.5 million in 1990), as reported by the American Booksellers Association. However this gives only a rough guide to the size of the Wiccan-related economy and he comments that the added complexity of determining the boundary between Wiccan or Neopagan products and New Age products makes determining the size of the movement from this rather problematic.

More conservative estimates included Helen Berger and Craig Hawkins in Exploring the World of Wicca, who guessed from 150,000 to 200,000. Melton, J. Gordon, Jerome Clark and Aidan A. Kelly in New Age Almanac (1991, p. 340) estimated a total of about 300,000 people associated with the "overall movement" of Wicca, with "tens of thousands" of members active in between 1,000 and 5,000 covens. Conservative estimates in 1993 arrived at about 50,000 Wiccans in the US (Religious Requirements & Practices of Certain Selected Groups: A Handbook for Chaplains, 1993) while Wiccan high estimates claimed several million (Phyllis Curott, The Book of Shadows: A Modern Woman's Journey into the Wisdom of Witchcraft and the Magic of the Goddess). In 2008, U.S. Today estimated 1 million Wiccans, a fast growth compared to the 100,000 to 200,000 estimated in late 1990s and early 2000s.

The United States Census Bureau's American Community Survey found 342,000 Wiccans and 340,000 Pagans in the United States in 2008.

== Wicca ==
"Emblem of Belief" #37

Wicca was introduced to North America in 1964 by Raymond Buckland, an expatriate Briton who visited Gardner's Isle of Man coven to gain initiation. Interest in the USA spread quickly, and while many were initiated, many more non-initiates compiled their own rituals based on published sources or their own fancy. Another significant development was the creation by feminists in the late 1960s to 1970s of an eclectic movement known as Dianic Wicca, or feminist Dianic Witchcraft.

The United States Department of Veterans Affairs in an out-of-court settlement of 23 April 2007 with the family of Patrick Stewart allowed the pentacle as an "emblem of belief" on tombstones in military cemeteries.

== Druidry ==
Druidry is also known as Druidism and Neodruidism. The Ancient Order of Druids in America was founded in 1912 as the American branch of the Ancient and Archaeological Order of Druids. Coming from the Druid cultural revivals in the UK in the 18th and 19th centuries, Neodruidry in the U.S. has a long history.

Celtic Reconstructionism, while not associated with Druidry directly, is also part of the cultural diaspora of Celtic Paganism. Celtic Reconstructionists place a greater emphasis on scholarly approaches, reviving and reconstructing the old practices of the Celts in the modern day.

== Asatru ==
Ásatrú in the United States began in the early 1970s with Stephen McNallen's 1974-1986 Asatru Free Assembly, formerly Viking Brotherhood, 1971-1974.

In 1986, the "folkish vs. universalist" dispute regarding the stance of Ásatrú towards white supremacism escalated, resulting in the breakup of the Asatru Free Assembly. The "leftist" (universalist) branch reformed as The Troth, while the "rightist" (folkish) branch became the Ásatrú Alliance (AA). McNallen re-founded his own organisation as the Ásatrú Folk Assembly (AFA) in 1994.

In 1997, the Britain-based Odinic Rite (OR) founded a US chapter (ORV). This means that folkish Asatru is represented by three major organizations in the US, viz. AA, AFA and OR. The three groups have attempted to collaborate within an International Asatru-Odinic Alliance from 1997 until 2002, when it dissolved again as a result of internal factional disputes.

== Discrimination ==
According to feminist pagan Starhawk "religious discrimination against Pagans and Wiccans and indigenous religions is omnipresent in the U.S."

Controversies mostly surround religious rights in US prisons and the US military. Prison inmates' right to practice minority religions was asserted in 2004 by the Supreme Court in Cutter v. Wilkinson.

== See also ==
- Religion in the United States
  - Ásatrú in the United States
- Dynion Mwyn
  - Neopaganism in Minnesota
  - Cutter v. Wilkinson
  - Dettmer v. Landon
  - Eric S. Raymond
  - Oberon Zell-Ravenheart
  - Starhawk
- Christianity and neopaganism
