= Odinist Community of Spain – Ásatrú =

Heathen organisation in Spain

Odinist Community of Spain — Ásatrú
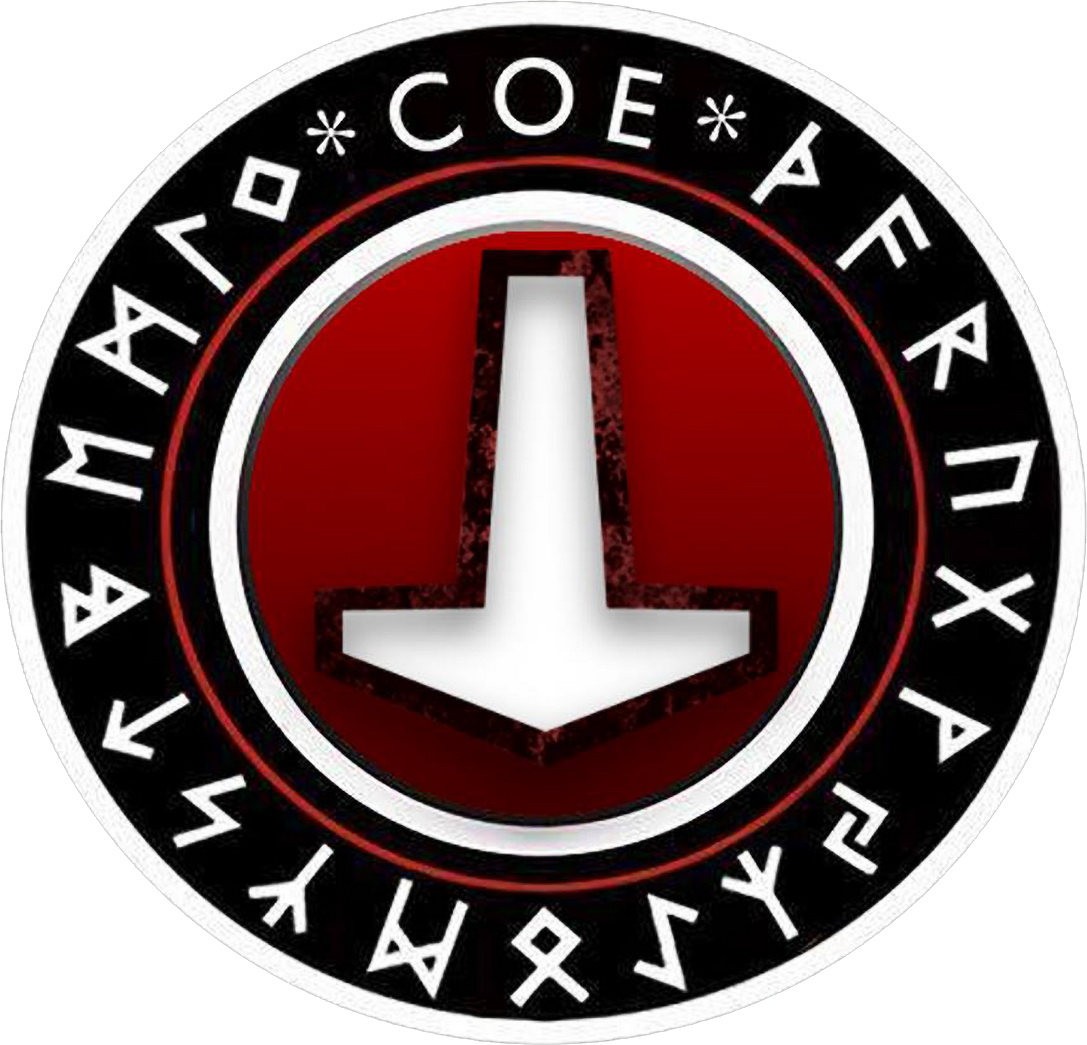
- Formation: 1981
- Type: Odinist Heathenry
- Location: Navas de Jorquera, Albacete, Spain
- Members: 400
- Founders: Ernust García, Isabel Rubio
- Website: https://www.asatru.es/

The Odinist Community of Spain – Ásatrú (Spanish: Comunidad Odinista de España – Ásatrú), also known as European Odinist Circle (Círculo Odinista Europeo), is a neo-völkisch organisation in Spain, founded in 1981, for followers of the form of modern Heathenry known as Odinism (after the chief deity of Germanic paganism, Odin). The community bases its ideology on the Visigothic, Suevian and Vandalian Germanic heritage of modern Spain, Portugal and Occitania. It was legally recognised as a religious institution by the Spanish government in 2007, and performed the first legal pagan wedding in mainland Spain since the Visigothic era in Barcelona on 23 December 2007. In Albacete in 2009, COE completed the first temple to Odin believed to have been built in over 1,000 years. A less Odin-focused group split off in 2012 as the Ásatrú Lore Vanatrú Assembly (ALVA).

== Odinism background ==
The OED dates the word Odinism at least as far back as 1822. The term Odinism was also used by Orestes Brownson in his 1848 "Letter to Protestants". The term was re-introduced in the late 1930s by Alexander Rud Mills in Australia with his First Anglecyn Church of Odin and his book The Call of Our Ancient Nordic Religion. In the 1960s and early 1970s, Else Christensen's Odinist Study Group and later the Odinist Fellowship brought the term into usage in North America. Odinists do not necessarily focus on the worship of Odin, and most honour the full Germanic pantheon. Within Heathenry, the term Odinist or Wodenist is typically used by neo-völkisch groups, who are characterised by their pseudoscientific beliefs that legitimate observance of the religion is predicated on belonging to a specific biological race and that the ability to hold a relationship with the gods is encoded in their DNA.

Ásatrú is a reconstructed Old Norse compound word derived from Áss or Ása (referring to the Æsir, one of the two families of gods in Norse paganism, led by Odin; the other being the Vanir), combined with trú, literally "troth" or "faith". Thus, Ásatrú is the 'Faith of the Æsir'). Vanatrú was coined after Ásatrú, implying a focus on the Vanir.

== History ==
Under the influence of Christensen's group, Ernesto ("Ernust") García and Isabel Rubio founded the Spanish Odinist Circle (Circulo Odinista Español) in Spain in 1981. Christensen gave her blessing to this organisation, and recognized it in the year of its founding. It later broadened into the Odinist Community of Spain – Ásatrú (Comunidad Odinista de España – Ásatrú. Since 2007, the organisation has also used the name "European Odinist Circle" (Círculo Odinista Europeo), after years of broader promotion of Odinism, and a shift back toward a focus on Odinism over Ásatrú and Vanatrú. The Europeo name is especially used by local congregations who are outside Spain or Spanish-speaking areas of Spain.

In 2006 the COE began a campaign against the destruction of an archaeological site in the ancient capital of the Visigoths, Toledo. Pressure was applied by COE, among others, on Jose Maria Barreda, who was then the local president of the autonomous community of Castile–La Mancha, and the site was preserved, containing the remains of a Visigothic settlement, which has since been declared a national monument.

COE went from being simply a cultural organisation to a religious institution officially recognized by the Spanish government, in 2007, under the name of Comunidad Odinista de España-Asatru, allowing them to perform "legally binding civil ceremonies" (weddings).

As of 2010, European Odinist Circle has requested a declaration of Notorio arraigo from the Spanish government.

In 2014, a census of COE's extended Odinist community totalled over 10,000 members with a presence throughout the whole country.

== Structure ==
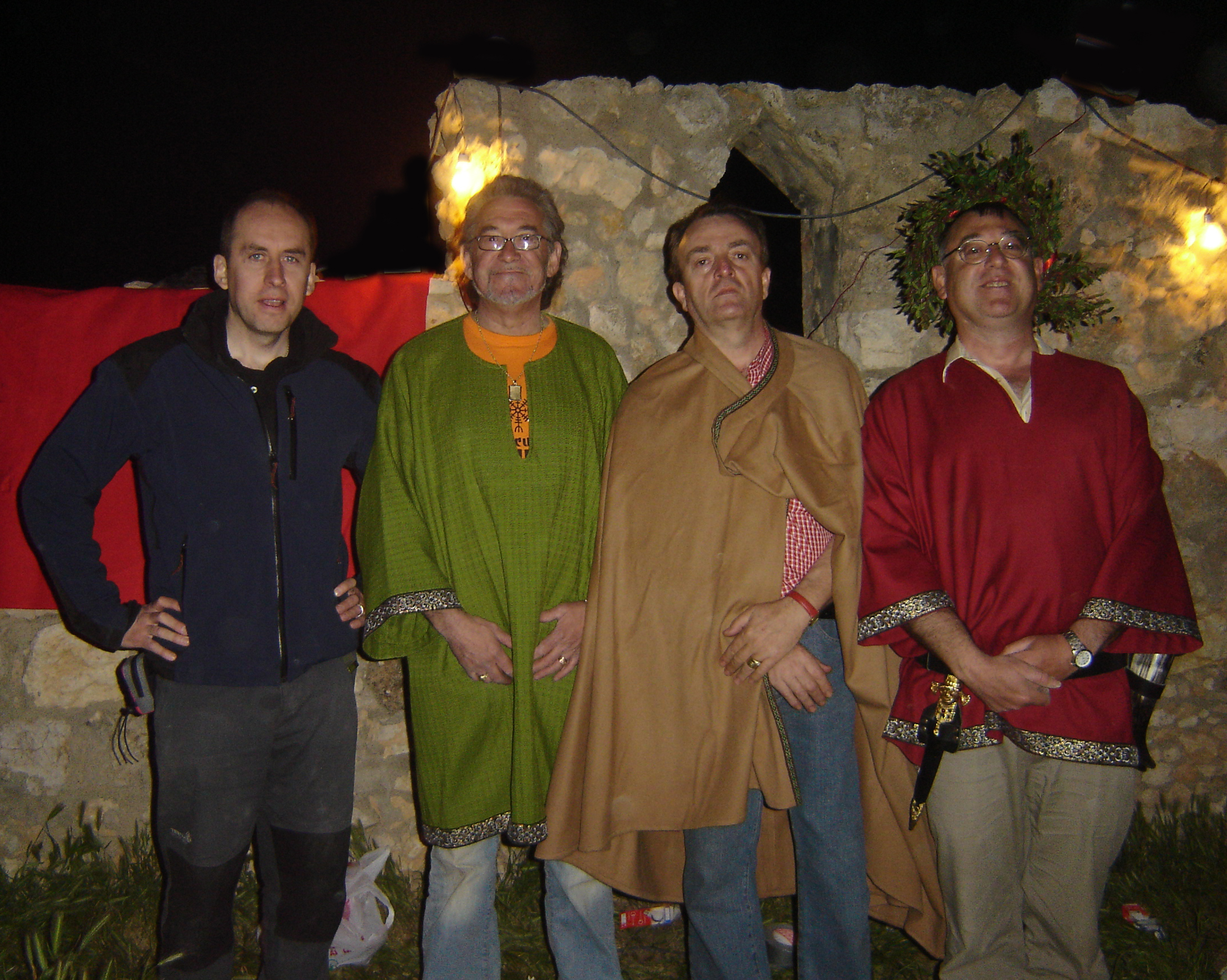
Ernesto García, the current Allsherjargoði, on the right

Alberto Paredes was elected president in 2009. In late 2011, co-founder Ernust García was elected as president again, after the resignation of Paredes.

== Beliefs ==
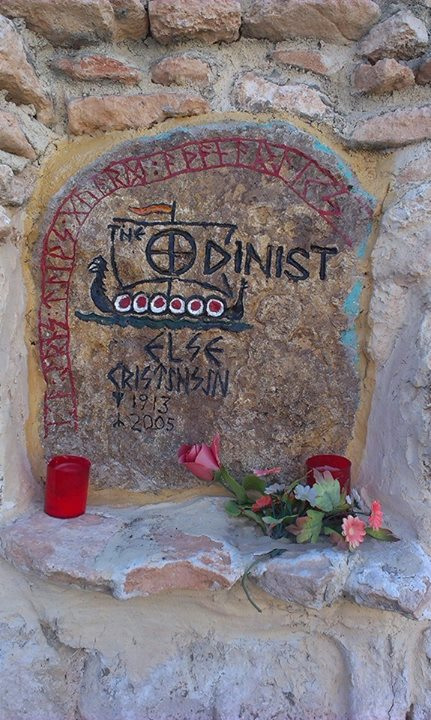
Else Christensen's memorial stone placed at the COE temple in Albacete

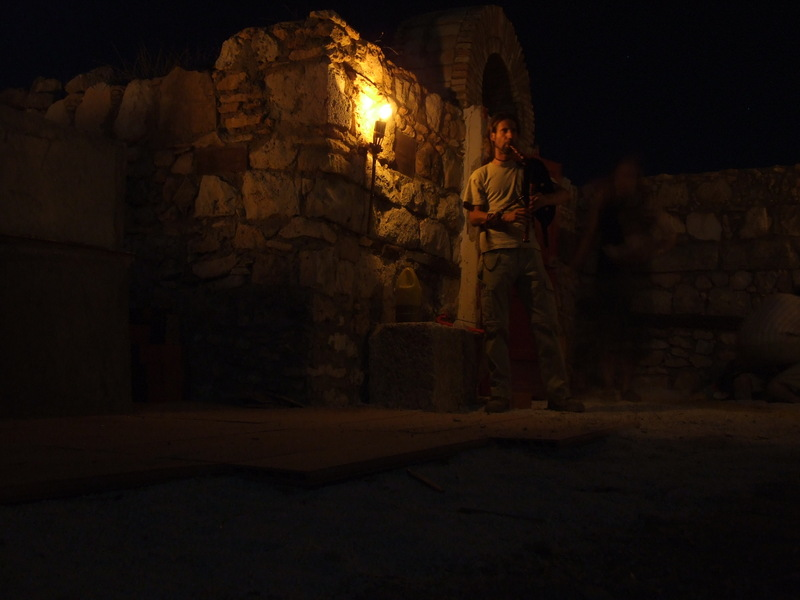
Interior view of the Odinist temple of Navas de Jorquera

The body of COE's doctrine is promulgated under the name Continental Odinist Rite. In addition to naturally adopting the moral code of the Odinist religion, the Nine Noble Virtues, as part of its creed, COE has added its own set of nine Programmatic Points:

1. Odinism, our ancestral religion in Europe.
2. The religion of the future.
3. The Gods and the sacred.
4. A code of values as a vital livelihood.
5. Odinism as a lifestyle.
6. The world, man, soul and body.
7. Respect for diversity. Fight for identity.
8. Religion, politics, and society.
9. Everything perishes, everything returns to be.

The organisation also accepts the idea of metagenetics, proposed by the Stephen McNallen, the founder of the neo-völkisch hate group - the Asatru Folk Assembly. He defines this concept as "the hypothesis that there are spiritual or metaphysical implications to physical relatedness among humans which correlate with, but go beyond, the known limits of genetics". This idea of "biological kinship" has been noted to have been historically used to justify ethnocentrism, racism and classism, and is regarded as pseudoscience.

Similar to most other Odinist Heathen groups, the COE maintains that the observance of the religion is only legitimate for those of specific ancestry, however, unlike most Odinist groups that believe this ancestry to be that of Germanic-speaking Northern Europeans, the COE believes the religion to be exclusively for those of European descent. They espouse the view that the role of Odinism is to unite Europeans and that Odinists should strive to return to Thule, or Hyperborea, which they describe as being the origin, destination and spiritual centre of their religion. The group further believes that the "current ideological establishment" both hates and twists the Germanic heritage of Spain, preferring instead an "Afro-Semitic" version of history, which the COE describes as a "pseudo-historical story" that was made up for socio-cultural reasons and to fit the modern Spanish and European "guilt complex".

== First marriage ==
On 23 December 2007, the first legal pagan wedding in mainland Spain in over 1,500 years took place on the beaches of Vilanova i la Geltrú, in the Barcelona province of Catalonia.

On September 4, 2021, the first mixed ceremony was held in the municipal plenary hall in the Barcelona municipality of Gavà. For the first time, a civil and religious marriage came together in a town hall, during the exchange of rings, being the first time that a Spanish town hall hosted a marriage of this confession.

== Temple ==
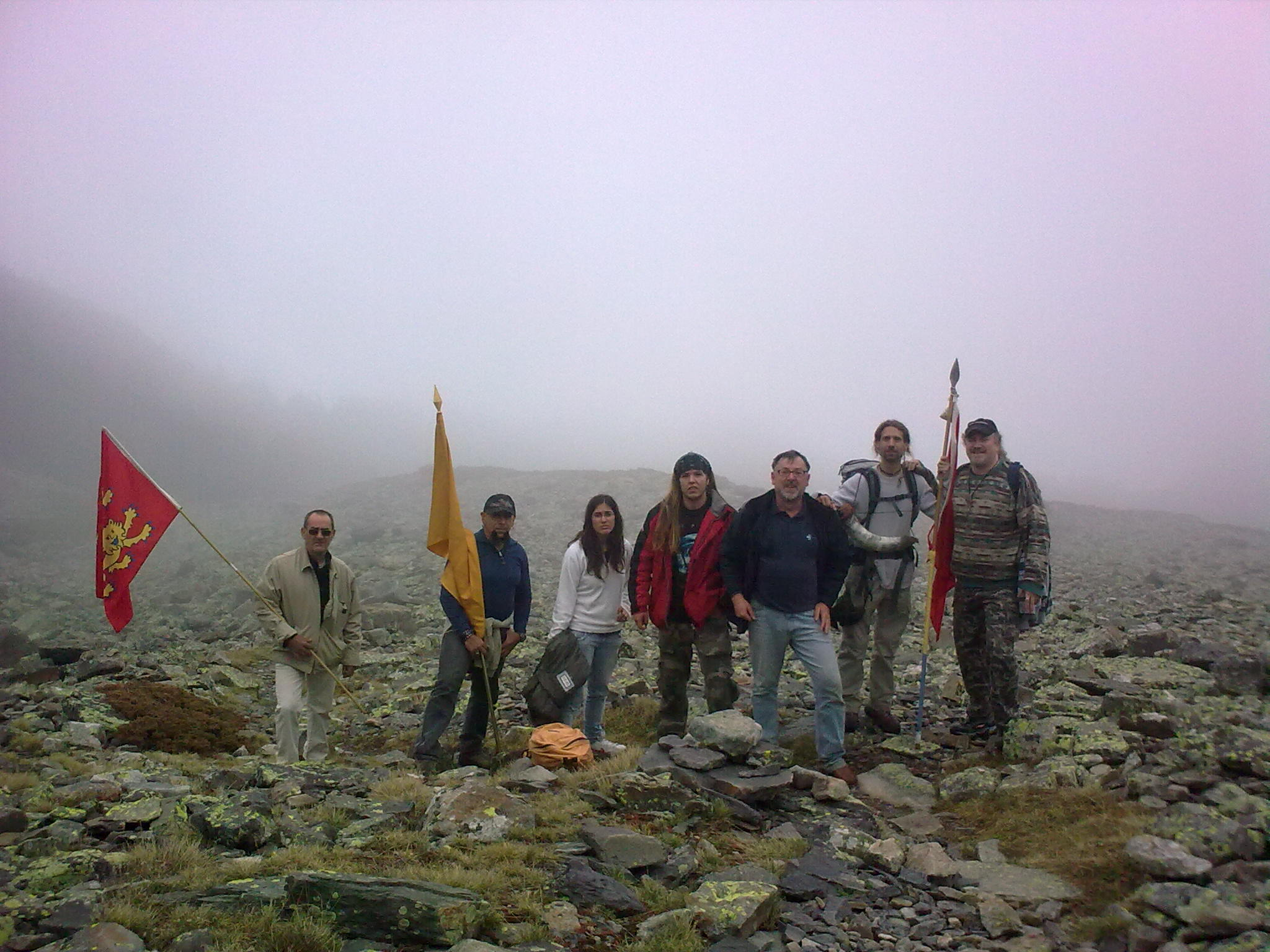
C.O.E. Odinists in Moncayo

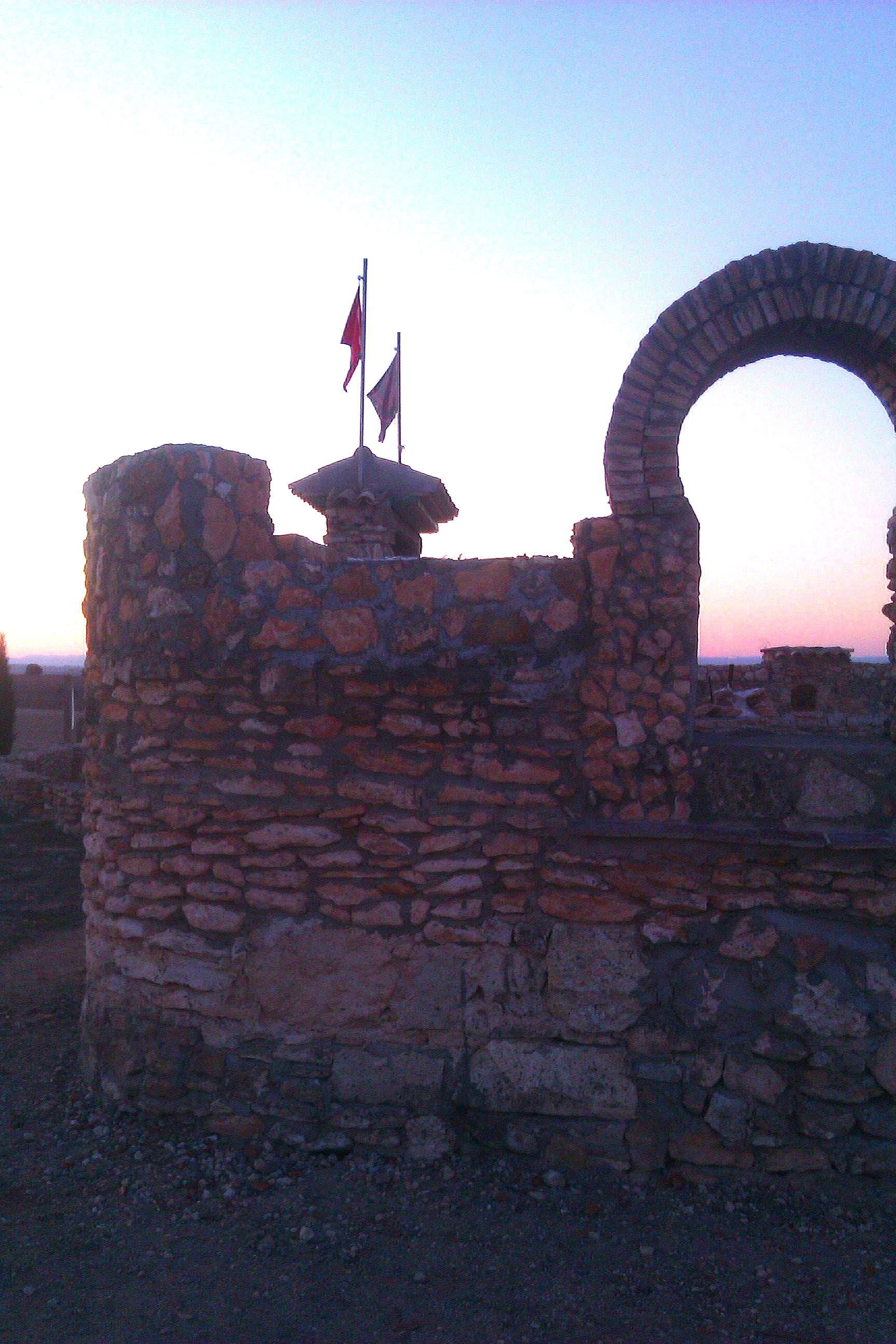
Templo de Gaut, Navas de Jorquera: first temple dedicated to Odin in the last 1,000 years.

One of the pillar projects of the reformed OCE was to build a temple. In Navas de Jorquera, a town of Albacete in Castile-La Mancha, OCE legally acquired a ruin relating to early period of the settlement. It was completely rebuilt by OCE, beginning in mid-2005, constructed in the form of three traditional halls:

1. Hall devoted to the Aesir.
2. Hall devoted to the Vanir.
3. Shields hall, used for celebrations.

The building, the Templo de Gaut (from Gautr, one of the many names of Odin), was completed in 2009, consecrated, and has been in use since then.

A memorial stone for the Odinist Else Christensen is housed in the temple.

== Texts published ==
COE published the first Spanish Odinist book in 2015, a confessional piece by Ernust García entitled Encuentro con Odin: Un Ensayo Sobre el Destino [Meeting with Odin: An Essay on Destiny]. In 2017, COE published Hávámál de bolsillo (Pocket Hávamál) in Spanish for the first time.
