= Religious discrimination against modern pagans =

Different instances of discrimination against modern paganism

Modern pagans are a religious minority in every country where they exist and have been subject to religious discrimination and/or religious persecution. The largest modern pagan communities are in North America, Russia and the United Kingdom, and the issue of discrimination receives most attention in those locations, but there are also reports from other countries.

This form of discrimination has been known online as "Wiccaphobia," or "paganphobia."

== Australia ==
In 2021, the Adelaide University Occult Club faced notable challenges in securing funding and campus access due to delays in reaffiliation from the student union, YouX. The club with multiple other clubs signed an open letter to the clubs committee while an online petition garnered 571 signatures.

In 2022, the club’s reaffiliation was rejected during an in camera decision with rejection of registration due to a complaint the club might summon Satan.

== Greece ==
In modern day Greece, the Greek Orthodox Church has the status of state religion, and consequently, alternative religions such as modern Hellenic paganism may be subject to discrimination.

The Greek Society of Attic Friends was unsuccessful when it asked for recognition as a legal religion and was denied the right to build a temple in Athens and to use existing temples for worship. 200 people illegally occupied a protected cultural site in Athens - a former temple - in 2007 to perform ceremonies.

In 2006, an Athens court ordered the worship of the old Greek gods to be unbanned and a place of worship has been recognized by court. Referring to the followers, Father Eustathios Kollas, who presides over a community of Greek Orthodox priests, said, "They are a handful of miserable resuscitators of a degenerate dead religion who wish to return to the monstrous dark delusions of the past."

== Canada ==
In September 2012, Conservative Minister of Public Safety Vic Toews cancelled a tender that had been issued by Corrections Canada in British Columbia for a Wiccan prison chaplain. In October of that year, Toews ordered the termination of contracts for all non-Christian prison chaplains in BC and all but two throughout Canada, obliging not only modern pagan prisoners but also Muslims, Jews, Sikhs, Buddhists, practitioners of indigenous religions, and others to turn to Christian chaplains for their spiritual needs. Wiccans were among the prisoners who joined a lawsuit alleging that the terminations violated constitutional guarantees of religious equality.

== United Kingdom ==
In the United Kingdom, there have been occasional clashes between New Age travellers and authorities, such as the Battle of the Beanfield in 1985. There are also occasional charges of harassment against modern pagans such as the following examples:

In 1999, Dr Ralph Morse was appointed by the Pagan Federation as their first national youth manager. Following an article that appeared in the Independent on Sunday on April 2, 2000, Morse was summarily suspended from his post as head of drama, theatre arts and media studies at Shenfield High School in Essex. Morse was subsequently fully investigated by the school and reinstated with a full retraction released to the media.

In 2006, members of Youth 2000, a conservative Catholic organization, on visit to Father Kevin Knox-Lecky of St Mary's church, Glastonbury, attacked pagans by throwing salt at them and told them they "would burn in hell". Knox-Lecky apologised and said he would not invite the group again. The police warned two women and arrested one youth on suspicion of harassment. In 2006, the postal worker Donald Holden was fired from his position at Royal Mail PLC after 33 years of employment for printing photos of Odin for his personal religious use. Before firing him his employers tried to make him admit Odinism was not a real religion and tore up the pictures in front of him. The Manchester Industrial Tribunal of Royal Mail PLC v Holden (2006) found unequivocally in Mr. Holden's favour.

In 2007, a teaching assistant in Brighton claimed she was sacked for being a Wiccan. A teacher at Shawlands Academy in Glasgow was denied time off with pay to attend Druid rites while members of other religions have their days of observance paid. A modern Druid group from Weymouth, Dorset, was subjected to threats and abuse.

The University of St Andrews in Scotland have, since 2006, allowed equal rights to the St Andrews Pagan Society, but under some strict rules.

== United States ==
According to Starhawk, "religious discrimination against Pagans and Wiccans and indigenous religions is omnipresent in the U.S." Evidence exists that workplace discrimination is common from verbal ridicule to more systematic forms such as exclusion from work-related activities.

=== In the armed forces ===
Emblem of Belief 37 – WICCA (Pentacle)

Emblem of Belief 55 – Hammer of Thor

In 1999, in response to a statement by Representative Bob Barr (R-GA) regarding Wiccan gatherings on military bases, the Free Congress Foundation called for U.S. citizens to not enlist or re-enlist in the U.S. Army until the Army terminated the on-base freedoms of religion, speech, and assembly for all Wiccan soldiers. Though this movement died a "quiet death", on June 24, 1999, then-Governor George W. Bush stated on a television news program that "I don't think witchcraft is a religion and I wish the military would take another look at this and decide against it."

U.S. Army Chaplain Captain Don Larsen was dismissed from his post in Iraq in 2006 after changing his religious affiliation from Pentecostal Christianity to Wicca and applying to become the first Wiccan military chaplain. His potential new endorser, the Sacred Well Congregation based in Texas, was not yet an officially recognised endorsement organisation for the military, and upon hearing of his conversion, his prior endorser, the Chaplaincy of Full Gospel Churches, immediately revoked its endorsement. At this point, the U.S. Army was required to dismiss him from chaplaincy despite an exemplary service record.

Prior to 2007, the United States Department of Veterans Affairs (VA) did not allow the use of the pentacle as an approved emblem of belief on headstones and markers in military cemeteries. This policy was changed in April 2007 to settle a lawsuit. VA also added the Hammer of Thor to the list of approved emblems in May 2013.

=== In prisons ===
The 1985, Virginia prisoner Herbert Daniel Dettmer sued Robert Landon, the Director of the Virginia Department of Corrections, in federal court, to get access to objects he claimed were necessary for his Wiccan religious practice. The district court for the Eastern District of Virginia decided in Dettmer's favor, although on appeal the United States Court of Appeals for the Fourth Circuit ruled that, while Wicca was a religion, he was not being discriminated against. This case marked the first legal recognition of Wicca as a religion.

In Cutter v. Wilkinson, 544 U.S. 709 (2005), a case involving five Ohio prison inmates (two followers of Ásatrú, a minister of the Church of Jesus Christ–Christian, a Wiccan witch and a Satanist) protesting denial of access to ceremonial items and opportunities for group worship was brought before the Supreme Court. Among the denied objects was instructions for runic writing requested by an Ásatrúarmaður, which was initially denied when prison officials raised concerns that runic writing could be used for coded gang communication.

In an interview about the role of race-based gangs and other extremists in America's prisons, the historian Mark Pitcavage came to the conclusion that "[n]on-racist versions of Ásatrú and Odinism are pretty much acceptable religions in the prisons", but materials from racist variants of these religions may be prohibited by corrections departments.

In early 2011, a Stillwater prisoner named Stephen Hodgson filed a federal lawsuit against the state of Minnesota claiming his religious rights had been violated. Hodgson claimed he was prohibited from practising his Wiccan faith when guards and prison administrators refused to allow him to use prayer oils and herbs needed. He also claimed that his religious mail had been confiscated and that he had been prohibited from burning incense or using prayer oils and herbs. He claimed those items were necessary for the practice of his religion and that they posed no danger to guards or other inmates. The Minnesota Department of Human Rights agreed with Hodgson, saying "probable cause exists to believe that an unfair discriminatory practice was committed." The discrimination case is awaiting trial.

=== Wicca ===
According to Gerald Gardner, who popularised Wicca in the twentieth century, the religion is a survival of a European witch-cult that was persecuted during the witch trials (sometimes called the Burning Times), and the strong element of secrecy that traditionally surrounds the religion was adopted as a reaction to that persecution. Since then, Margaret Murray's theory of an organised pan-European witch-cult has been discredited, and doubts raised about the age of Wicca; many Wiccans no longer claim this historical lineage. However, it is still common for Wiccans to feel solidarity with the victims of the witch trials and, being witches, to consider the witch-craze to have been a persecution against their faith.

There has been confusion that Wicca is a form of Satanism, despite important differences between these religions. Due to negative connotations associated with witchcraft, many Wiccans continue the traditional practice of secrecy, concealing their faith for fear of persecution. Revealing oneself as Wiccan to family, friends, or colleagues is often termed "coming out of the broom-closet".

Wiccans have also experienced difficulties in administering and receiving prison ministry, although not in the UK of recent times. In 1985, as a result of Dettmer v. Landon [617 F. Supp. 592 (D.C. Va 1985)], the District Court of Virginia ruled that Wicca is a legally recognised religion and is afforded all the benefits accorded to it by law. This was affirmed a year later by Judge John D. Butzner, Jr. of the United States Court of Appeals for the Fourth Circuit [Dettmer v. Landon, 799 F. 2d 929 (4th Cir. 1986)]. Nevertheless, Wiccans are sometimes still stigmatised in America, and many remain secretive about their beliefs.

Also in 1985, conservative legislators in the United States introduced three pieces of legislation designed to take away the tax-exempt status of Wiccans. The first one was House Resolution (H.R.) 3389, introduced on September 19, 1985, by Congressman Robert S. Walker (R-Pennsylvania), which would have amended to the United States Internal Revenue Code that any organisation which promotes witchcraft would not be exempt from taxation. On the other side of Congress, Senator Jesse Helms (R-North Carolina) added Amendment 705 to H.R. 3036, "The Treasury, Postal, and General Government Appropriations Bill for 1986", which similarly stated that organisations promoting witchcraft would not be eligible for tax-exempt status. After being ignored for a time, it was attached to H.R. 3036 by a unanimous voice vote of the senators. Congressman Richard T. Schulze (R-Pennsylvania) introduced substantially the same amendment to the Tax Reform Bill of 1985. When the budget subcommittee met on October 30, the Helms Amendment was thrown out as it was not considered germane to the bill. Following this, Schulze withdrew his amendment from the Tax Reform Bill, leaving only H.R. 3389, the Walker Bill. Joe Barton (R-Texas) was attracted to become a co-sponsor of this bill on November 14, 1985. The Ways and Means Committee set aside the bill and quietly ignored it, and the bill was allowed to die with the close of the 99th session of Congress in December 1986.

In 2002, Cynthia Simpson of Chesterfield County, Virginia, submitted an application to be invited to lead prayer at the local Board of Supervisors meetings, but in a response was told that because the views of Wicca were not "consistent with the Judeo-Christian tradition", her application had been denied. After the Board reviewed and affirmed their policy, Simpson took the case to the U.S. District Court of Virginia, which held that the Board had violated the Establishment Clause by advancing limited sets of beliefs. The Board appealed to the Fourth Circuit Court of Appeals, which in 2005 reversed the ruling and held that the Supreme Court's holding in the Marsh case meant that "Chesterfield County could constitutionally exclude Simpson from leading its legislative prayers, because her faith was not 'in the Judeo-Christian tradition.'" The Board had also since modified its policy to direct clerics to not invoke the name of Jesus. On October 11, 2005, the United States Supreme Court rejected an appeal by Simpson, leaving in place the decision by the Fourth Circuit. However, in Town of Greece v. Galloway, the Supreme Court ruled that legislative prayer cannot be restricted on basis of belief, re-opening the debate about Simpson's case.

In 2019, Pauline Hoffmann sued St. Bonaventure University after she allegedly was forced to resign as dean due to her religion.

=== Ásatrú ===
The United States government does not officially endorse or recognise any religious group, and numerous Ásatrú groups have been granted non-profit religious status, like other religious faiths, going back to the 1970s.

An inmate of the "Intensive Management Unit" at Washington State Penitentiary alleges that adherents of Ásatrú in 2001 were deprived of their Thor's Hammer medallions as well as denied religious literature, as well as complaints against the prison chaplain calling Ásatrú "'devil worship,' etc."

In 2007, a federal judge confirmed that Ásatrú adherents in US prisons have the right to possess a Thor's Hammer pendant. An inmate sued the Virginia Department of Corrections after he was denied it while members of other religions were allowed their medallions.

In the Georgacarakos v. Watts case Peter N. Georgacarakos filed a pro se civil-rights complaint in the United States District Court for the District of Colorado against 19 prison officials for "interference with the free exercise of his Asatru religion" and "discrimination on the basis of his being Asatru".

The Cutter v. Wilkinson case was partially about an adherent of Ásatrú being denied access to ceremonial items and opportunities for group worship. The defendants on numerous occasions refused to answer or respond to letters, complaints, and requests for Ásatrú religious accommodations. They also refused to respond to complaints of religious discrimination. Ásatrú inmates were denied group worship and/or group study time as they did to other religions. They refused to hire a Gothi to perform blóts while providing priests for members of other religions. The Ásatrú inmates were also denied the right to have their own worship or study services.

In a joint press release the Odinic Rite, Ásatrú Alliance and Ásatrú Folk Assembly charged the FBI with violating its First Amendment rights to freedom of religion, free speech, and peaceful assembly by giving "False, misleading and deceptive information about our religion and its followers" in FBI's Project Megiddo report.

The Anti-Defamation League (ADL) publishes lists of symbols used by antisemitic groups. Included in these publications are several Germanic pagan symbols that have been used by Nazi and neo-Nazi groups, but have also always been used by non-racist pagan religions. The ADL emphasises that these symbols are not necessarily racist and has amended its publications to categorise these symbols as "pagan symbols co-opted by extremists".

== Soviet Union ==
The Soviet Union under Stalin’s oppressive regime led to the rise of a Russian spiritual underground of the twentieth century. While Westerners often associate Soviet underground movements with political dissent, there was also a network of clandestine spiritual groups. The Communist Party and KGB targeted these groups, knowing that spiritual seekers were particularly resistant to indoctrination. Members and leaders of these spiritual and mystical groups faced severe persecution, including imprisonment in labour camps, and, from the 1960s onward, forced confinement in psychiatric hospitals with fraudulent diagnoses and antipsychotic treatments. Despite these harsh measures, the persistence of spiritual practices continued.

== See also ==
- Christian views on magic
- Heathenry in the United States
