= Robert Stine =

Robert Stine may refer to:

- R. L. Stine (born 1943), American writer and producer
- Robert Stine, co-founder of the Viking Brotherhood
