= Free Spirit Alliance =

American non-profit organization serving the Pagan and Pantheist communities

The Free Spirit Alliance (FSA) is a non-profit spiritual networking organization serving the Pagan and pantheist communities. Founded on May 21, 1986 and based in the Mid-Atlantic area of the United States, FSA's focus has been presenting regional and local events where people from diverse backgrounds can learn and share ideas. Its promotional literature and website state that the organization has striven to develop a national reputation for being willing to work with often sensitive and personal issues in a friendly and safe environment.

FSA’s main event is the Free Spirit Gathering, held in June. The gathering is held at a private campground near Darlington, Maryland.

The Free Spirit Gathering is a program-driven outdoor festival which focuses upon magical and spiritual opportunities for the greater Pagan and magical communities. FSG places a strong emphasis on education, training, networking, celebration and fellowship. It attracts people from as far away as Washington, California, Hawaii, Texas, Minnesota and Canada. It is one of the oldest Pagan festivals in the country, celebrating its 35th year in 2020, and in peak years has had an attendance of over 800 people.

== See also ==
- Neopaganism in the United States
