= Else Christensen =

Danish heathenism figure and white separatist (1913–2005)

- Christensen late in life, in a photograph by historian of religion Mattias Gardell
- Born: Else Oscher; September 12, 1913; Esbjerg, Denmark
- Died: 2005 (aged 91–92); Vancouver Island, Canada
- Occupation: Odinist

Else Christensen (September 12, 1913 – 2005) (Note: Christensen's exact date of birth and date of death are not specified in any reliable sources.) was a Danish proponent of the modern Pagan new religious movement of Heathenry. She established a Heathen organisation known as the Odinist Fellowship in the United States, where she lived for much of her life. A Third Positionist ideologue, she espoused the establishment of an anarcho-syndicalist society composed of racially Aryan communities.

Born Else Oscher in Esbjerg, Denmark, Christensen developed her anarcho-syndicalist sympathies while living in Copenhagen. From this position she moved toward the Strasserite National Bolshevik faction of the National Socialist Workers' Party of Denmark, which brought together a far-right emphasis on race with a left-wing approach to economics. In 1937, she married fellow Danish Nazi activist Aage Alex Christensen; however, because of their National Bolshevik allegiances, they were placed under heavy scrutiny amidst the German occupation of Denmark during World War II. After the war they moved to England and then Canada, settling in Toronto in 1951. Corresponding with various far right activists, she came upon the writings of the American far right ideologue Francis Parker Yockey and the Australian Odinist Alexander Rud Mills, both of whom had a profound influence on her.

Christensen believed that Jews control the Western socio-political establishment, and felt that this would prevent the growth of any explicitly political movement to spread racial consciousness among those she deemed to be Aryan. Instead, she believed that Heathenry – a Pagan religion that she termed "Odinism" – represented the best way of spreading this racial consciousness. In 1969, Christensen and her husband founded a group called The Odinist Fellowship. Alex died in 1971, and Christensen continued her work, relocating to the United States. That year she began publication of a newsletter called The Odinist, which continued for many years. In 1993 she was imprisoned for drug smuggling, although maintained that she had been used as a drug mule without her knowledge. On release, she was deported to Canada, where she lived in Vancouver Island during her final years.

Christensen exerted a significant influence over the racially oriented Odinist movement, gaining the moniker of the "Folk Mother" within that community. Her life and activities have been discussed in a number of academic studies of Odinism and the far right in North America by scholars like Nicholas Goodrick-Clarke, Mattias Gardell, and Jeffrey Kaplan.

== Biography ==
=== Early life: 1913–1968 ===
Christensen was born as Else Oscher in 1913 in Esbjerg, western Denmark. She became a professional handweaver and in 1933 moved to Copenhagen. There, she embraced anarcho-syndicalism and became a follower of the anarcho-syndicalist ideologue Christian Christensen. Exposed to the various competing radical groups on both the far right and far left, she came under the increasing influence of the Strasserite wing within the National Socialist Workers' Party of Denmark (DNSAP), a group which had embraced the Nazi ideology of Germany's Nazi Party. In 1937 she married the woodcarver and unionist Aage Alex Christensen, who had served as the top lieutenant of the DNSAP leader Cay Lembcke. The Christensens became associated with the Strasserite National Bolshevik faction of the party, but Aage was part of the faction ousted when Frits Clausen seized control.

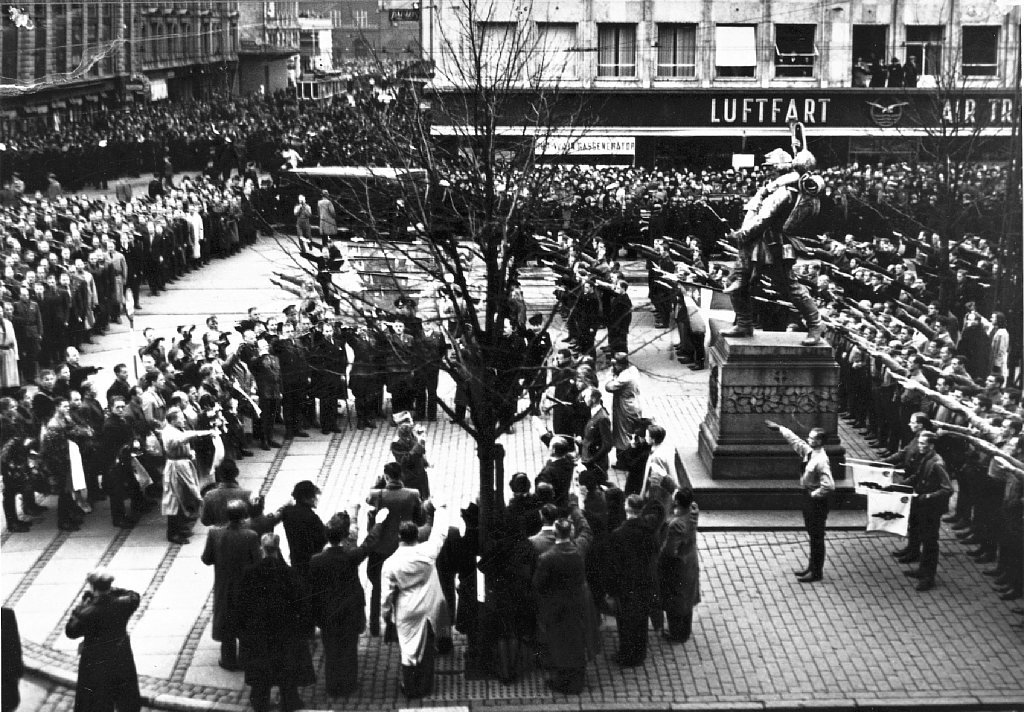
A rally of the DNSAP, with whom Christensen was involved

Following the German invasion of Denmark in 1940, both Else and Aage were arrested for the latter's involvement in National Bolshevist armed cells. Christensen was released after three days' interrogation, but Aage was convicted of illegal weapons' possession and detained for six months. At that point, Christensen convinced her father's cousin, who was Minister of Justice, that Aage should be released. Following the end of World War II, the couple left Denmark for England. In 1951 they migrated to Canada, where they settled in Toronto; here, Elsa worked in various hospitals, a vocation she retained throughout her life.

Retaining an interest in class and race-based radicalism, she established contacts with various far right activists in the neighboring United States, including Willis Carto and James K. Warner, the latter being the New York organizer of the American Nazi Party. Warner had earlier attempted to establish Odinism as a religious wing of the American Nazi movement, but having believed this to be a failure he gave Christensen all of his leftover material on Odinism. It was in this material that Christensen came across the Call of Our Ancient Nordic Religion, a pamphlet authored by the Australian Odinist Alexander Rud Mills. Although Christensen believed that many of Mills' ideas were too heavily influenced by Freemasonry for her liking, she was profoundly influenced by his ideas about reviving the worship of ancient Norse deities. Her approach to the understanding of such deities would be heavily influenced by Jungian psychology, believing that the Norse deities were encoded in a collective unconscious of the white race.

She was also influenced by the writing of the far right American theorist Francis Parker Yockey, in particular his 1962 work Imperium, in which he lamented the defeat of Nazi Germany and blamed it on the influence of Jews in Europe and the U.S. Influenced by Yockey, Christensen came to believe that Aryan culture had reached its "senility phase", personified by the ideologies of Christianity, communism, and capitalism, the belief that all human beings are equal, and the internationalist erosion of the distinct cultures of different races. She also read Oswald Spengler's Decline of the West; however, she rejected Spengler's pessimistic view that this decline was terminal, instead opining that the Aryan civilization could be rejuvenated through its adoption of a new religion - Odinism. She deemed Odinism to be a religion that had a natural and intrinsic relationship with what she perceived to be a Northern European race, stating that the "primary source" of the faith was "biological: its genesis is in our race, its principles encoded in our genes." She also believed that this Odinism should use Norse names for the deities rather than Anglo-Saxon or Teutonic ones in order to avoid the post-war animosity between England and Germany.

=== Odinist Fellowship: 1969–2005 ===
"We, as Odinists, shall continue our struggle for Aryan religion, Aryan freedom, Aryan culture, Aryan consciousness and Aryan self-determination."

— Else Christensen, 1985.

Christensen established the Odinist Fellowship in 1969, then based from her mobile home in Crystal River, Florida. The academic specialist in the far right Jeffrey Kaplan termed it "the first organizational expression of racialist Odinism in the United States", while the religious studies scholar Stefanie von Schnurbein noted that Christensen created her version of Odinism as "a discrete vehicle to establish her cultural pessimist, anti-Semitic, and radical racial agenda in a religious cloak". In 1971, her husband died, after which she began to focus more fully on her Odinist activities. She began touring North America to promote Odinism, and in August 1971 released the first issue of her own magazine, The Odinist, which opened with the banner of "New Values from the Past". The Odinist focused heavily on right-wing issues, with Kaplan noting that commentaries on right-wing ideas, contemporary news, and anti-semitic ideas were "regular fare" within its pages, while explicit discussions of Odinist theology or Old Norse texts were "few and far between". The Pagan journalist Margot Adler deemed The Odinist to be "frankly racist, although they probably would have preferred the term 'racialist'."

Christensen believed that Odinism was the ideal tool for the advancement of Aryan racial consciousness, expressing her opinion that the Jewish-controlled establishment would not permit her to do it a more explicit way, stating that "You cannot repeat the mistake that Hitler made [of explicitly attacking the Jews] ... Everybody knows that the Jews rule the whole damned world, so you cannot fight their combined power. You need to watch your step." A number of The Odinist's readers wrote letters to the magazine expressing disapproval of what they perceived as the editors' support of Nazism, to which Christensen publicly responded that such accusations were "the cheapest of all shots that can be aimed against anyone who finds something positive to say about ... National Socialism ... or who merely desires some degree of objectivity in dealing with this grossly maligned movement."

In the early 1970s, Christensen got in contact with Valgard Murray and Elton Hall, Heathens operating a kindred in Arizona, and in 1976 their group would be the first to be certified by the Odinist Fellowship. During the early 1980s she established a prison-outreach program in the hope of attracting incarcerated individuals to Odinism, in doing so getting Odinism legal recognition as a religion from the state of Florida. In the prisons, the Odinist Fellowship organised four seasonal festivals a year that were marked with sumbel as well as commemorating Hitler's birthday.

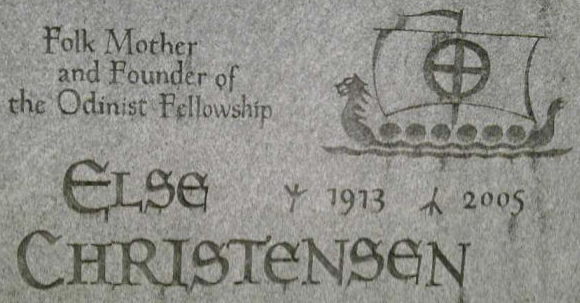

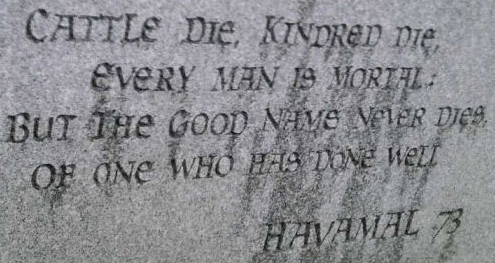
Detail of Else Christensen's grave stone

In 1993 Christensen was arrested, tried, and sentenced to five years, four months imprisonment for trafficking marijuana and heroin. She claimed that she had been driving a car from Texas to Florida as a favor to friends, and had no knowledge that she was being used as a drug mule by them. Many Odinists and Asastruer decried the sentence, and claimed that it was a political frame-up; Murray established a Free Else Christensen Committee and with Stephen McNallen created a defense fund to aid her. Christensen herself did not endorse the claim that the charges were politically motivated, instead blaming her own naivete at being exploited by drug dealers. Before being imprisoned she gave the Odinist Fellowship's membership list to McNallen for the use of his own Heathen organisation, the Asatru Folk Assembly.

After serving her sentence, she was deported to Canada, something which left her feeling bitter. There, Max Hyatt, the gothi of the Asatru Alliance-affiliated group Wodan's Kindred, invited her to live at his home in Vancouver Island, British Columbia. However, after personal and political differences surfaced, Christensen left Hyatt's home and moved into an RV park in Parksville, Vancouver Island, where she lived in a small trailer. Despite being far less involved in Odinic activities than she had been previously, she set about trying to revive the Odinist Fellowship. In 1998 she began publication of Midgard Page, which was produced in both paper and electronic copies, the latter of which was housed on Hyatt's Wodansdaeg Press website. During her later years, she became more moderate in her views, encouraging a cultural change among Aryans rather than political actions. This contrasted with the more radical views of newer groups like Wotansvolk, who embraced militant action to bring about socio-political change. She died on May 4, 2005.

== Ideology ==
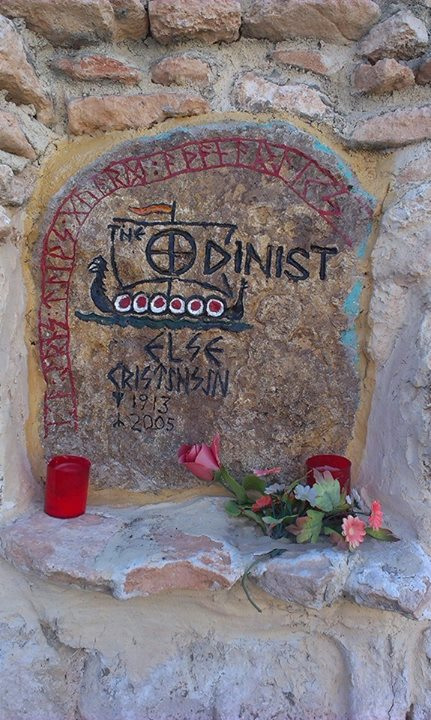
Else Christensen's memorial stone placed at the Odinist Community of Spain — Ásatrú temple in Albacete, Spain.

The scholar of religion Jefferson F. Calico noted that Christensen pursued "a political, racially based Heathenry", while the historian of religion Mattias Gardell believed that Christensen's Odinism represented a separate Heathen tendency to McNallen's Asatru, characterising Christensen's version as "a more political and racial interpretation with notable national socialist influences". He noted that Christensen viewed the religion as a means through which to bring about "racial unification and rejuvenation". Her approach to Odinism focused largely on the study of books rather than on spiritual experiences gained through ritual, and she rejected the claims of other Heathens that they are visited by anthropomorphic gods, dismissing these claims as signs of lunacy.

Christensen believed that the present power structure of society was going to collapse, and that racial-oriented Odinists should be prepared for this. She believed that revolutionary activity to overthrow oppressive governments is a natural instinct for Aryans, as was reflected "from Jefferson to Hitler." Although she approved of its attitude to race, she believed that the example of Nazi Germany was not one that should be emulated because of its totalitarian structure and alliance with capitalists. Instead she expressed favorable comments regarding the economically left-wing policies of the early Benito Mussolini government in Italy, and of the Strasserite National Bolshevik factions within Germany's Nazi Party. She expressed the view that Hitler's regime did not reach its "true potential" and that instead it should have retained its "original, socialist and folkish agenda".

In espousing an anti-totalitarian and anti-capitalist attitude that favored a de-centralized societal organization, Christensen reflected her anarchist values. Describing her ideal social situation as "tribal socialism", she envisioned a world in which white people lived in small, self-sufficient "tribal" Odinist rural communes, each of which was autonomous, and in which private enterprise was permitted but resources and social responsibilities were shared. She believed that the societies of ancient Northern Europe had been similarly anarchistic in nature, expressing the view that this anarchist emphasis on freedom was intrinsic to the "nature" of Aryan people; in this way her attitude differed strongly from the anti-racist perspective of most anarchists.

Christensen expressed the opinion that these communities should be racially homogenous and should exhibit "racial consciousness", opining that in a voluntary social order, no one would want to live alongside those of a different race. Although denying that she was a white supremacist, she was clear about being a white separatist. She argued for a ban on inter-racial marriage, with the intent on keeping the 'Aryan' race "pure". This preoccupation with concepts of purity was common within the National Socialist milieu, exhibiting itself not only in racial terms but also environmental ones too. Christensen rejected capitalism, consumerism, and materialism, believing in the need for ecological awareness, a back-to-the-earth ethos, and sustainable production.

== Legacy and influence ==
The historian of esotericism Nicholas Goodrick-Clarke described Christensen as "the most public voice of Odinism in the United States from the early 1970s onward", while in 2003 Gardell stated that the Odinist Fellowship was "the oldest organization" on the Heathen scene. Calico noted that Christen was responsible for bringing Folkish Heathenry to the United States and influenced "many of the first generation of leaders who built a truly American Heathen movement". She represented, according to Calico, "a bridge between the American Odinist scene and the intellectual lineage of the Germanic völkisch movement."

Christensen came to be known as the "Grand Mother" among racially oriented Odinists, with many paying homage to her even if they had sought out a more aggressive approach to racial issues than that which she adopted. Alternately, many in the Odinist community know her as the "Folk Mother". A number of her ideas proved to be key influences on the American Odinist movement, most notably her political and economic "tribal socialism", her emphasis on recruiting people through prison ministries, and her emphasis on a Jungian archetypal interpretation of the Norse deities.

Christensen had a great importance on the formation of modern Paganism in Spain, in recognition within the Odinist orthodoxy the Spanish Odinist Circle, which became the Comunidad Odinista de España-Asatru, that got official acceptance in 2010, i.e., full recognition and equality with other faiths recognized by the Spanish state, was considered by her followers in Spain as "Mother Folk". The day of her death is an official day of worship in the Odinist faith in Spain.

== See also ==
- First Anglecyn Church of Odin
- National anarchism
