= Navas de Jorquera =

Coordinates: 39°17′N 1°43′W

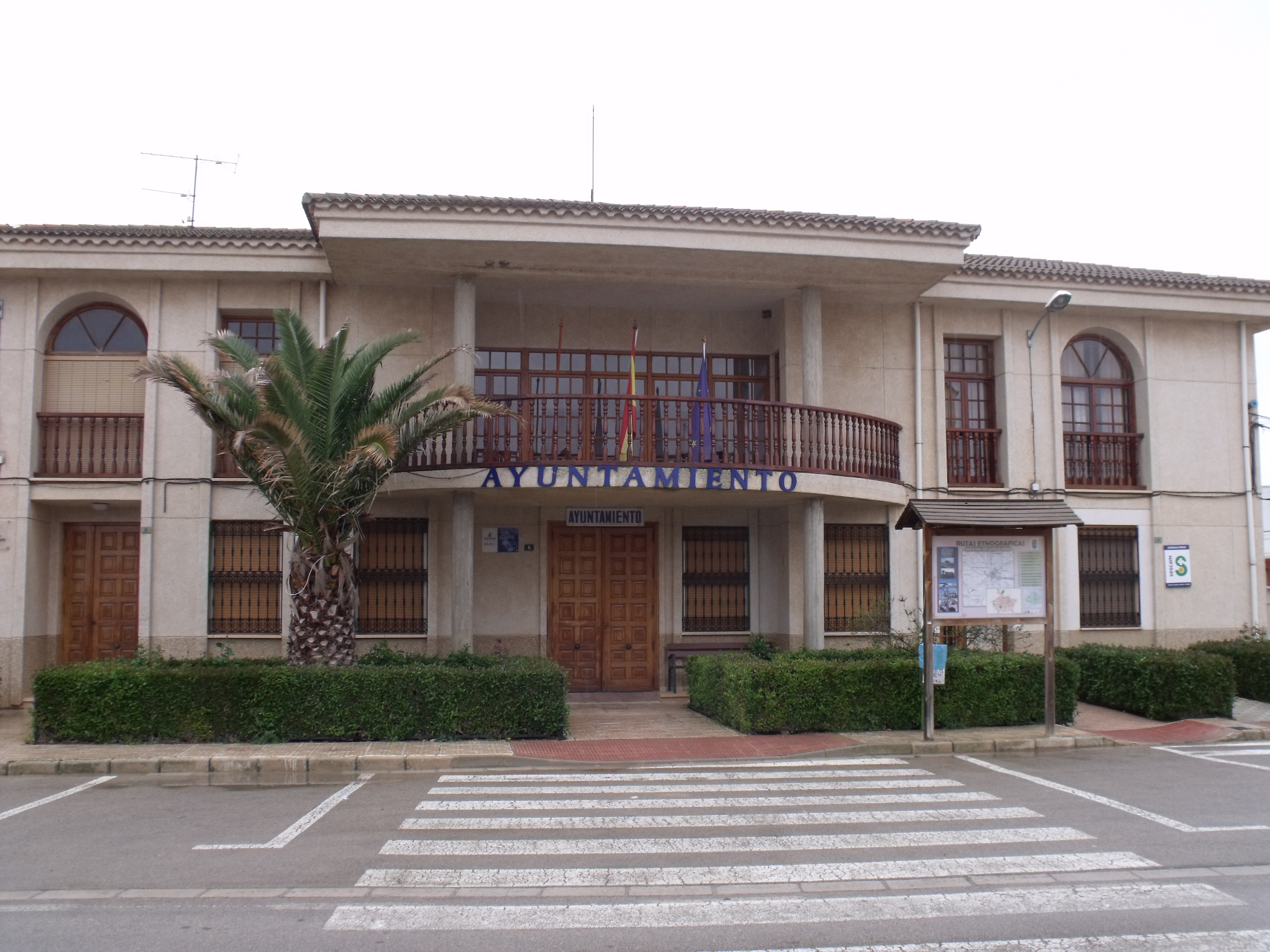
Town hall

Coat of arms of Navas de Jorquera

Navas de Jorquera is a municipality in the city of Albacete, Province of Albacete, Castile-La Mancha, Spain. It has a population of 520.
