= Alexander Rud Mills =

Australian Odinist writer (1885–1964)

- An undated photograph of Mills
- Born: Alexander Rud Mills; 15 July 1885; Forth, Tasmania, Australia
- Died: 8 April 1964 (aged 78); Melbourne, Victoria, Australia
- Education: University of Melbourne
- Occupation: Barrister
- Spouse: Evelyn Louisa Price
- Relatives: Herbert Hays (brother-in-law)

Alexander Rud Mills (15 July 1885 – 8 April 1964) was an Australian barrister and writer, interned in 1942 for his Nazi sympathies and fascist beliefs. He was also a prominent Odinist, one of the earliest proponents of the rebirth of Germanic Neopaganism in the 20th century, and an anti-Semite. He founded the First Anglecyn Church of Odin in Melbourne in 1936. He published under his own name and the pen-names "Tasman Forth" and "Justinian".

== Early life ==
Mills was born on 18 July 1885 in Forth, Tasmania. He was the son of Annie Elizabeth (née Vertigan) and Alexander Rudd Mills; his father was a farmer. His sister Patience married Senator Herbert Hays.

Mills received his secondary education at Devonport, Tasmania. He financed his further education by working as a labourer in Western Australia for a period. He applied to join the AIF during World War I at which time he was living at Sea Lake. He was rejected on medical grounds. His soldier's reject badge was No. 65039. Mills eventually moved to Victoria to enrol at Melbourne University Law School. From 1914 to 1915 he worked as a schoolteacher at Haileybury College in Brighton. One of his law school classmates was future prime minister Robert Menzies. Mills graduated from the University of Melbourne in 1916. He was admitted to the Victorian Bar in 1917 and subsequently practised as a solicitor.

== Political sympathies and activities ==
In 1930, Mills stood for preselection as Nationalist candidate for the seat of Hawthorn. He was not successful. The following year, having little work but some money, he embarked on a trip around the world. He visited South Africa but did not like either the climate nor the 'mixed races'. He then visited Italy, Germany, Britain and the USSR. Although already reactionary in nature, he claimed to have become disillusioned with communism, which he had come to view as a form of organised thuggery, during his trip to Russia. He claimed that conditions in the USSR itself were appalling and that "Russia will cure any Communist if he goes to work there." In England, he attended meetings of Oswald Mosley's 'British Union of Fascists', and Arnold Leese's smaller and more radical 'Imperial Fascist League'. He aligned himself more closely with the Imperial Fascists and later helped to distribute Leese's newspaper, The Fascist, in Australia.

Historian of esotericism Nicholas Goodrick-Clarke characterises Mills as a "Nazi sympathiser". Mills' trip to Germany included a visit to the Brown House where, without appointment, he met Adolf Hitler "talking" (Mills would later recount) "to some of his confreres". At the 1944 Australia First enquiry, Mills claimed that Hitler had impressed him as a "kindly man" who "seemed to have the respect of his men and appeared kind to them." In Germany, Mills also met followers of General Erich Ludendorff, the famous First World War strategist and conspiracy theorist who was also, like Mills, virulently anti-Semitic.

Returning to Australia in January 1934, Mills established the Anglecyn Church of Odin. He told an undercover agent the following year that this 'religion' was a front which allowed him to pursue his dedication to fascism without fear of prosecution. In 1935, he also founded a group called the 'British Australian Racial Body'. He established two short-lived newspapers, the National Socialist and The Angle, as vehicles through which to espouse his racist, pseudo-religious and political views. At this time he maintained correspondence with officials of the British Union of Fascists. During wartime investigations into his views during the 1930s, it was established that he owned an autographed photograph of Julius Streicher, publisher of Der Stürmer. In 1941, he became associated with the anti-War, pro-Isolationist Australia First Movement and contributed to its newspaper The Publicist, which, before 1939, had described itself as being "for national socialism" and "for Aryanism; against semitism", and which was the mouthpiece for William John Miles, a leading member of the Rationalist Society.

Mills' The Odinist Religion: Overcoming Jewish Christianity was published in 1939. In that work, Mills claimed (without evidence) that Nordic races had established the ancient civilisations of Sumer, Egypt, Persia, Greece, and Rome, but that they had been weakened by miscegenation with other races. He was particularly affronted by the espoused Christian assumption that all humans were equal. The following year he stood as an independent for the seat of Fawkner at the 1940 federal election. He polled 2,152 votes compared to Harold Holt's 38,387 (for the United Australia Party) and Arthur Fraser's 22,558 (for the Australian Labor Party). He received the support of the Motorists' Protection League. His platform included increased pay for soldiers, additional war service homes for returned soldiers, government control of the Commonwealth Bank to "control all Australian loans and cheapen money to encourage young people to marry and rear families". He also said that "more encouragement should be given to music, art, literature and philosophy, to ensure a well-balanced national life".

== Internment ==
Mills was the first resident of Victoria to join Australia First, though he would later claim to be only a passive member. Barbara Winter shows that, in fact, he fully supported Australia First's position, read its publications and was convinced of the idea of a widespread Jewish conspiracy; he believed, for instance, that former Australian prime minister Billy Hughes was half-Jewish and that Chiang Kai Shek was a prominent freemason and therefore in the thrall of 'Jewish Christianity'. Mills' membership of Australia First and his well-known Nazi sympathies were possibly the reason he was arrested on 7 May 1942 and detained without trial lest he aid the Japanese army which at that time seemed likely to invade Australia. Major Edward Hattam of the Commonwealth Investigation Branch later testified that he believed "Mills had views leaning somewhat toward Nazi ideology." There were claims made that during his internment he 'was prominent in openly advocating a Japanese victory.' He was interned until 17 December 1942. Bruce Muirden's The Puzzled Patriots refers to Mills' claim that he had been insulted, then bashed with a rifle, by an officer of the camp guard at Loveday Internment Camp in South Australia, though Mills did not mention this during the 1944 inquiry into Australia First. Peter Henderson, writing of Australian Nazi sympathisers of the 20th century, suggests that his Australia First association was not the reason for Mills' internment: "Mills was interned primarily for leading the Odinist cult in Victoria, as well as for receiving 'substantial sums from unknown sources' and for his links with German and British Nazi groups."

In Federal Parliament on 30 March 1944 Robert Menzies, then leader of the opposition, said of Mills, "I happen to know him quite well, because he went through the university at the same time as I did... he was hauled out of his home, imprisoned and put in an internment camp... his association, so I am informed, with the Australia First Movement amounted to this: some man who had secured appointment with the movement wrote to him and asked him to subscribe, and he forwarded 10s 6d. as a subscription... I know this man and I know something of the disaster which this has brought upon him... Here is a man who for twenty-odd years was building up a practice as a professional man. He was taken out of his home, just as anybody might be. He was incarcerated in circumstances of immense notoriety. When he came out, what happened? His friends were gone, his practice gone, his reputation was gone."

== Mills' Odinism ==
Having formulated "his own unique blend" of Ariosophy, he drew heavily on writings of pioneering Austrian Ariosophist and Wotanist Guido von List. Much of Mills' ideology focused around what he conceived as the "British race", a group who he believed also inhabited not only Britain but other parts of the world colonised by the British Empire. That concept was particularly problematic given the ethnically and linguistically diverse nature of the British population during the early 20th century. Mills believed that while Christianity was alien to the "British race", Odinism was 'native' and thus could be better understood by them. He expressed the view that "our own racial ideas and traditions (not those of others) are our best guide to health and national strength". He was critical of Christianity, believing it to be "unnatural" because – in his view – it encouraged the breaking down of racial barriers.

In Mills' theology, the Norse gods were symbols of the divine rather than actual anthropomorphic entities, and he believed that each racial group had its own symbolic system for interpreting and understanding divinity. For Mills, Odin represented an archetypal father figure, with other deities from Norse mythology, such as Thor and Frigg, having minor roles.

In his 1936 liturgical text, The First Guide Book to the Anglecyn Church of Odin, Mills gives a version of the Ten Commandments that is only slightly different from that in Exodus, and Mills' formulary includes vigils, hymns, evensong and communion, making it abundantly clear that Mills based the liturgy of the Anglecyn Church of Odin on that of the Anglican Church. However, while textually there is a debt to Christian worship, philosophically Mills expresses strong anti-Christian sentiments throughout:

"... the Christian religion is, in one phase at least, a form of Jewish propaganda, as well as a condemnation of ourselves."

"... our Christian culture ... has now bought us to ever-greater worship of time-subservient materialism ..."

"... in the Christian religion its doctrines and outlook has been personified and adorned with stories calculated to appeal to a certain weakness of man."

Anti-Semitic comments can likewise be found scattered throughout the Guide Book. He claims, for instance, that Jewish people plot world conquest:

"... the Jews, generally speaking, recognise the degradation and disintegration of the peoples under Christian culture, and by its direction or otherwise, have hopes of ruling over such peoples ... and because Jews try to hasten the process by using the many powers in their control."

"... many Jewish Leaders have deemed it an intellectual conquest of other peoples, [if they persuade] other races to forget their own race and Lords, and at the same time induce them to ... self –renunciation (take-the-lowest-seat) ... making such persons and nations unworthy to live and only fit to be ruled, before their extinction."

control the media:

"... in our newspapers, colleges, wireless and the like news-services (even when not directly controlled Jews [sic]) ... the word 'Jew' is only spoken with circumspection ..."

and dominate Freemasonry:

"[Freemasonry has] been seriously affected by reason of the pervading Jewish culture, which war against our national and racial identity ... and the Jewish racial spirit ... and the denial of our own."

== Later life ==
After Mills was released from internment in late 1942 he continued to promote his vision of Odinism. He remained an active writer, publishing eight books and numerous articles and pamphlets between 1933 and 1957 on Odinist themes. He published Law for the Ordinary Man under the pen-name "Justinian" in 1947. Law for the Ordinary Man, which has no publisher stated (only a printer, A. R. Johnson of Surrey Hills), was written, Mills stated, for 'the "man in the street"; foreigners (to Australia, although some laws discussed were unique to Victoria); 'for students before beginning their law studies'; schoolteachers, 'business men', and 'generally for those people who have little or no time to study the law'. In this book, Mills used as an example of 'international law' two 'primitive villages' which, in his opinion, were likely only to agree on points of law if their inhabitants 'are of the same race.' 'If, however, the villages differ in language and race, if they are temperamentally very different, then the measure of agreement is not very great.'

Mills also wrote a song, "Australia", with Henry Hedges, published in or around 1954.

For over thirty years, Mills had a friendship and romance with schoolteacher Evelyn Louisa Price. They were married at Holy Trinity, Church of England, Surrey Hills, on 2 June 1951. At the time of their marriage Mills was 65, Price 62.

Bruce Muirden relates that Mills continued to pursue compensation for his internment in the 1940s for long after his release and threatened to write about his experiences, 'still talking about a book' in 1961. 'His chaotic ideas changed little in his final years. He remained obsessively anti-Jewish, anti-Christian and anti-black.'

Mills died at Box Hill Hospital from a coronary thrombosis on 8 April 1964. He is buried at Ferntree Gully Cemetery, Victoria; Evelyn died on 9 July 1973 and is buried with her husband. Curiously, considering Mills' avowed rejection of Christianity, and his wife's status as an 'Odinist of many years' standing', both are buried in the Church of England section of the Cemetery. In 2021, an exposé in the Melbourne Age of Australian Neo-Nazis gave brief details of 'a ceremony inspired by Norse mythology, instructed by a tattooed Odinist at the grave of one of Australia's first well-known neo-Nazis [sic], Alexander Rud Mills.'

== Legacy and influence on Germanic neopaganism ==
Writing in the Australian Religion Studies Journal, A. Asbjørn Jøn characterised Mills as "obscure yet important", having played a "very significant role" in the development of Norse-oriented Neopaganism.

During the 1960s, the Danish far right activist Else Christensen came across Mills' work while she was living in Canada. Although Christensen felt that many of Mills' ideas were too heavily influenced by Freemasonry for her liking, she was profoundly influenced by his ideas about reviving the worship of ancient Norse deities. Christensen subsequently established the Odinist Fellowship in 1969, then based from her mobile home in Crystal River, Florida. According to Australian historian of the far right, Kristy Campion, the Odinist religion had more influence in the United States than in Mills' native Australia.

In the early 1970s, a group of Australian Odinists, who were students at the University of Melbourne, sought a guarantee from the Australian Attorney-General that if Odinism were formally revived it would not be persecuted (as, they claimed, Mills' church had been). Attorney-General Lionel Murphy pursued a course of allowing freedom of religion within Australia, and by the early 1990s the Odinic Rite of Australia had been granted legal status by the Australian government.

In 1980, Kerry Raymond Bolton from Christchurch, New Zealand, along with David Crawford, co-founded a New Zealand group called the Church of Odin. They both had a background in far-right political activities. Paul Spoonley quotes Crawford as saying that the Church of Odin was exclusively for whites, and specifically whites "of non-Jewish descent", and that "the main Odinic law requires loyalty to race". By 1983 Bolton had left the Church.

Today, the main Odinist religious bodies that see significance in Mills' work are the northern hemisphere's Odinic Rite, the Odinic Rite of Australia, and the Asatru Folk Assembly.

== Partial bibliography ==
- And Fear Shall Be In The Way. London: Watson & Co. 1933.
- Hael, Odin!. Melbourne: Village Belle Press. 1934.
- The First Guide Book to the Anglecyn Church of Odin. Sydney: Forward Press. 1936.
- Ritual Book of the Moots of the Anglecyn Body. 1937.
- The Odinist Religion: Overcoming Judeo Christianity. Melbourne: Ruskin Press. 1939.
- Law for the Ordinary Man. Melbourne: self-published. 1947.
- The Call of Our Ancient Nordic Religion: Reflections on the Theological Content of the Sagas. Coventry, England: Northern World Pub. 1957.
