= Hellenion =

Hellenion (Greek: Ἑλλήνιον) has been used to refer to:

- Hellenion (Naucratis), an Ancient Greek sanctuary in Naucratis of Egypt (founded in the 6th century BC)
- Hellenion (Sparta), a temple of Zeus Sellanios in Sparta
- Hellenion (Cairo), a short-lived association founded in early 1900s by the Greek community of Egypt.
- Hellenion, an active Hellenic Neopagan organization in the United States; founded in 2000.
