= The Troth =

International heathen organization based in the United States

The Troth, formerly the Ring of Troth, is an American-based international heathen organization. It is prominent in the inclusionary, as opposed to folkish, sector of heathenry. The organization was founded on December 20 (Mothers' Night), 1987 by former Ásatrú Free Assembly members Edred Thorsson and James Chisholm. Chisholm remains associated with the organization as an Elder Emeritus. The current President (position formerly referred to as "Steer") is Reverend Ben Kowalsky-Grahek.

The Troth is registered as a non-profit corporation in the state of New York with federal 501(c)(3) status as a public charity. It hosts a yearly June meeting called Trothmoot. Trothmoot 2022 was held at Meeman-Shelby Forest State Park near Memphis, Tennessee.

== Objectives and organization ==
The Troth defines itself as a religious organization of Germanic Heathenry open to all the forms of the religion (Asatru, Urglaawe, Forn Sed, and others) international in scope, with training clergy, promoting cooperation and community, and providing information and educational publications as objectives.

== History ==
The Troth was founded as "The Ring of Troth" in 1987, at the same time as the Ásatrú Alliance, both emerging from the wreckage of the Ásatrú Free Assembly, which had disintegrated over disputes between the racialist and the non-racialist factions. The organization suffered a series of setbacks and disasters during the late 1980s to early 1990s. The leadership of both Thorsson and Chisholm became controversial because of their association with the Satanist Temple of Set. In 1988 to 1989, Rob Meek campaigned against the "Satanist infiltration" of the group. The Ásatrú Alliance in 1989 declared that there could be no association of Ásatrú and Satanism. In 1991, Thorsson and Chisholm sought for a new leader (Steersman) of the group, as it had become clear that they were too controversial to fill this position. The office of Steerswoman was eventually accepted by Prudence Priest in 1992. Internal controversy continued to plague the group, however, including accusations that Priest was intending to pass leadership back to Thorsson and attempting to marginalize the increasingly influential Stephan Grundy. As a consequence, Priest was ousted by William Bainbridge in 1995, who took over as interim Steersman. By the mid-1990s, the Troth, now led by William Bainbridge, had emerged as a stable organization with a wide spectrum of members situated "squarely within the Wiccan/neopagan community". Bainbridge was followed by Diana Paxson (1999), Stefn Thorsman (2002), Mark Donegan (2005), Patricia Lafayllve (2008), Victoria Clare (2010), Steve Abell (2013), Rob Schreiwer (2016), Lauren Crow (2022), and Benjamin Kowalsky-Grahek (2023).

== Approach within Heathenry ==
The Troth is prominent in the non-racialist, inclusive branch of modern-day heathenry. The organization's statement of purpose and bylaws refer to "non-discriminatory groups and individuals" and specify that "Discrimination [based on criteria such as race, gender, ethnic origin, or sexual orientation] shall not be practiced by The Troth, its programs, departments, officers, or any affiliated group, whether in membership decisions or the conduct of any of its activities."

Edred Thorsson intended the Ring of Troth to be based on scholarship and provide priests trained to high academic standards. While few members have achieved graduate degrees as he envisaged, the organization has been a prominent source of scholarly information within heathenry.

== Publications ==
The Troth publishes a quarterly journal called Idunna, an annual Old Heathen's Almanac, and a handbook called Our Troth.

== Ring of Troth Europe ==
A United Kingdom affiliate of the Ring of Troth, later renamed Ring of Troth Europe, was founded in 1993 by Freya Aswynn, who has held office in both the Troth and the Rune Gild. Aswynn was removed as a member and elder of The Troth in August 2018, citing a violation of the organization's inclusion policies.

== Eldaring ==
The German Eldaring started in 2000 as a partner society of The Troth, and was officially founded and registered in 2002. As of 2008, it had an active Internet forum claiming almost 5,000 users. It became an independent nonprofit organisation in 2009. It claims political neutrality, and rejects "practices and worldviews that run counter to the free democratic basic order of the Federal Republic of Germany.. (this) includes political right-wing and left-wing extremism, homophobic and racist attitudes, sexism, calls for violence and the occult world views of theosophy or ariosophy." In 2025 Eldaring claimed to have more than 600 members.
