= Ásatrú Alliance =

American Heathen organization

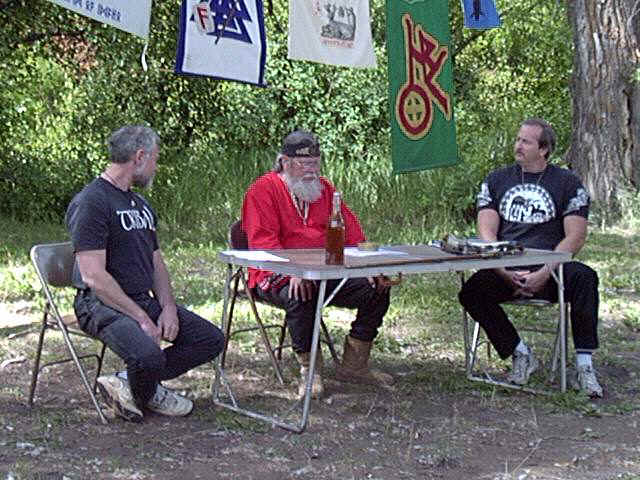
Michael "Valgard" Murray (center) with Stephen McNallen (left) and Eric "Hnikar" Wood (at the 2000 IAOA Althing)

The Ásatrú Alliance (AA) is an American Heathen group founded in 1988 by Michael J. Murray (a.k.a. Valgard Murray) of Arizona, a former vice-president of Else Christensen's Odinist Fellowship. The establishment of the Alliance, as well as the establishment of The Troth, followed the disbanding of the Asatru Free Assembly ("old AFA") in 1986. The Ásatrú Alliance largely reconstituted the old AFA, is dominated by prior AFA members, and acts as a distributor of previously AFA publications. Initially aligned with the "folkish" wing of Heathenry, which emphasized ancestry-based participation, the Alliance has since disavowed racial exclusivity and now emphasizes Norse cultural and spiritual traditions without requiring ancestral lineage.

Valgard Murray died on February 4, 2025, after a battle with cancer. As of 2023, the Allsherjargothi of the Alliance is Ottar F. Valgardsson. The Ásatrú Alliance describes itself as a family-oriented association of independent kindreds who practice Ásatrú, the ancestral ethnic religion of the Northern European peoples. Organized along tribal-democratic lines, the Alliance convenes its annual governing council, the AlThing, where bylaws are established and affirmed by participating kindreds. It promotes the cultural heritage of Northern Europe through religious expression and explicitly rejects hatred, racism, and political extremism. Political activity within the religion is prohibited under its bylaws.

== 2023 Statement on Race ==
In 2023, the Ásatrú Alliance released a formal "Statement on Race," declaring that Ásatrú is "not a religion for ‘white people’ only" and affirming that "Askr and Embla, our common human ancestors in the lore, are the ancestors of all mankind." The Alliance stated that it would not admit kindreds that restrict membership based on race or ethnicity. It described this position as rejecting both "universalist and folkish extremes," and identified its orientation as "tribal," based on shared values and community participation rather than racial ancestry. The organization's FAQ further explains this tribal orientation as one that welcomes all who honor the gods, live by its values, and contribute to the community.

== Background ==
Stephen McNallen founded the Asatru Folk Assembly ("new AFA") in 1994 as the successor organization to the Asatru Free Assembly. The Alliance and the Folk Assembly organizations have existed in parallel since, temporarily united within the International Asatru-Odinic Alliance (1997–2002). The group is typically classified by scholars as folkish based on their ethnocentrism and restricting of membership to those of specific ancestry. The AA defines Ásatrú as "the ethnic religion of the Northern European peoples".

The Ásatrú Alliance is recognized as a 501(c)(3) non-profit religious organization, or church. The AA was formed on June 19, 1988 by seven kindreds, which were members of the disbanded Ásatrú Free Assembly, who ratified on this day a set of by-laws to preserve and promote the beliefs of Ásatrú in the United States of America. As a definition of Ásatrú, AA cites a 1995 essay by McNallen on "what is Ásatrú", which concludes by summarizing the main goals as the practice of "courage, honor, the importance of the family and ancestral bonds, strength, freedom, the preservation of our kind, and joyful, vigorous life."

The AA is currently headed by a board of directors composed of representatives appointed by their kindred, to speak on their behalf for any AA business. The AA held its 32nd annual Althing gathering in September 2012. Kaplan (1996) estimates the AA has between 500 and 1,000 members. World Tree Publications is the Ásatrú Alliance's publishing house.

== Valgard Murray ==
Valgard Murray (Michael J. Murray), born in 1950 in Iowa to a farming family, to Thomas and Marion Murray of Scottish, Lithuanian, Irish, and German descent. Murray later moved to Arizona and became an electrical engineer.

Murray was involved with the American Nazi Party (ANP) into the late 1960s. and learned of Odinism/Asatru through Elton Hall. He later became the Arizona organizer of the ANP. He has also been the spokesperson for the Arizona-based outlaw brotherhood Iron Cross MC. In 1969, Murray worked with Else Christensen to found the Odinist Fellowship, and served as vice president.

In the early 1970s Murray and Hall formed a kindred and made contact with Else Christensen. In 1976 the Arizona Kindred became the first kindred certified as such by the Odinist Fellowship, which until then had only individual members.

In 1984, the Arizona Kindred chose to affiliate with the Asatru Free Assembly (old AFA) instead. In 1986, he founded World Tree Publications, and in 1987, he served as general manager of the AFA. At the second Althing of the AFA, Murrary allegedly threatened to kill a homosexual attendee with a Mac-10.

When the AFA folded, he and Robert Taylor of the Tribe of the Wulfings, began to create the Ásatrú Alliance in 1987, inviting other kindreds to a formational Althing in 1988. He was a representative of the Ásatrú Alliance, was on the board of the International Ásatrú-Odinic Alliance (IAOA), and was chosen the first honorary IAOA Allsherjargoði for the three-year period. In 1988 he was elected the Alsherjargothi of the Ásatrú Alliance.

In 2013, Murray commented on the killing of Colorado Department of Corrections head Tom Clements as the alleged murderer "practiced a controversial form of religion behind bars" which was Asatru.

In 2014, Murray was interviewed in a three-part series by George Whitehurst Berry on the Sedona Dreams Show. During this interview, Murray stated that Asatru means, "faith in God." Asked if it actually refers to gods and goddesses, he responds, "Well, yes it did, but the word itself is not plural, it just means faith in God. And, it does of course mean, in the old way, respect in honouring the old gods and goddesses of the Northern European people."

Murray remained the Allsherjargoði of the Ásatrú Alliance of Independent Kindreds, Inc. until entering a semi-retirement in 2015.
