= Stephen McNallen =

American spiritual leader (born 1948)

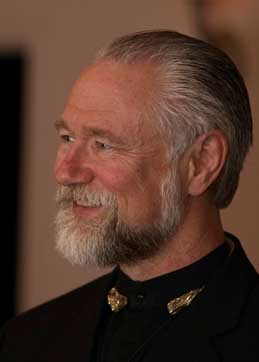
- McNallen in 2005
- Born: Stephen Anthony McNallen; October 15, 1948 (age 77); Breckenridge, Texas, U.S.
- Education: Midwestern State University
- Occupation: Spiritual leader (goði)
- Years active: 1970–present
- Spouse: Sheila Edlund (m. 1997)

Stephen Anthony McNallen (born October 15, 1948) is an American proponent of Heathenry, a modern Pagan new religious movement, and a white nationalist activist. He founded the Asatru Folk Assembly (AFA), which he led from 1994 until 2016, having previously been the founder of the Viking Brotherhood and the Asatrú Free Assembly.

Born in Breckenridge, Texas, McNallen developed an interest in pre-Christian Scandinavia while in college. In 1969–70 he founded the Viking Brotherhood, through which he printed a newsletter, The Runestone, to promote a form of Heathenry that he called "Asatru". After spending four years in the United States Army, he transformed the Viking Brotherhood into the Asatrú Free Assembly (AFA), through which he promoted Heathenry within the American Pagan community. He espoused the belief, which he named "metagenetics", that religions are connected to genetic inheritance, thus arguing that Heathenry was only suitable for those of Northern European ancestry. A growing membership generated internal conflict within the AFA, resulting in McNallen's decision to expel those with neo-Nazi and racial extremist views from the organisation. Under increasing personal strain, in 1987 he disbanded the Assembly.

Moving to Northern California, McNallen began a career as a school teacher; during the summer vacations he travelled the world as a military journalist, writing articles for Soldier of Fortune magazine. Concerned by what he saw as the growth of liberal, universalist ideas in Heathenry, he returned to active involvement in the Heathen movement in the mid-1990s, establishing the Asatrú Folk Assembly, which was headquartered in Grass Valley, California. In 1997 he was involved in the establishment of the International Asatru/Odinist Alliance alongside Valgard Murray's Ásatrú Alliance and the British Odinic Rite. He brought greater attention to his group after they became involved in the debate surrounding the Kennewick Man, arguing that it constituted evidence for a European presence in prehistoric America. In the 21st century he became more politically active, becoming involved in both environmentalist campaigns and white nationalist groups linked to the alt-right movement.

McNallen is a controversial figure in the Heathen and wider Pagan community. His espousal of right-wing ethnonationalist ideas and his insistence that Heathenry should be reserved for those of Northern European ancestry has resulted in accusations of racism from both Pagans and the mainstream media. Conversely, many on the extreme right of the Heathen movement have accused him of being a race traitor for his opposition to neo-Nazism and refusal to endorse white supremacism.

== Biography ==
=== Early life: 1948–1976 ===
McNallen was born in the rural town of Breckenridge, Texas on October 15, 1948, to a family of practicing Roman Catholics. After high school, he attended Midwestern State University in Wichita Falls, Texas. While there, he began to investigate alternative religions, reading about the modern Pagan religion of Wicca and the writings of the occultist Aleister Crowley. In his freshman year of college he read a novel, The Viking, by Edison Marshall, which generated his interest in the societies of pre-Christian Scandinavia. According to him, upon reading this book he "got hooked on the spirit of the North", being attracted to the Vikings by what he perceived as "their warlike nature, their will to power, and their assertion of self". In 1968 or 1969 he dedicated himself to the worship of the deities found in Norse mythology, and remained a solitary devotee of theirs for about two years. He later noted that on initially becoming a Heathen, he went through "a stridently anti-Christian phase", and that while he later mellowed in his opinion of Christianity and Christians, he still believed the religion to be "a faulty faith, a foreign imposition on European soil" which had eroded "our traditional culture" and "done us great damage".

"The racial or ethnic end of it was not immediately apparent to me. I think many people first get involved in racial politics, and then later decide that maybe Odinism or Asatrú attracts them. With me, it was quite the reverse as I was attracted to the religion first, simply for its own value, and it was only later, that I began to realize that there's an inherent connection between one's ethnicity and the religion that they follow."

— Stephen McNallen.

In 1969–70, McNallen founded the Viking Brotherhood, issuing a "Viking Manifesto" in which he stated that the Brotherhood was "dedicated to preserving, promoting and practicing the Norse religion as it was epitomized during the Viking Age, and to further the moral and ethical values of courage, individualism, and independence which characterized the Viking way of life." While the group placed greater emphasis on promoting what McNallen perceived as the Viking ideals — "courage, honor, and freedom" — rather than on explicitly religious goals, in 1972 they gained tax-exempt status as a religious organization from the Internal Revenue Service. In the winter of 1971–72 he began publishing a newsletter, The Runestone, using a typewriter and mimeograph machine; he gained his first eleven subscribers through an advert that he placed in Fate magazine. He initially used the term "Norse religion" to describe the Heathen religion that he was practicing, before later adopting the term "Odinism" from the work of Danish Heathen Else Christensen. He then changed it once again, this time to "Asatru", which he had discovered in Magnus Magnusson's book, Hammer of the North, and subsequently popularized within the American Heathen community.

During his college years, McNallen had been a cadet in the Reserve Officers Training Corps, and on completion received a degree in political science. After completing his college education he joined the United States Army, remaining with them for four years, volunteering for service in the Vietnam War before being stationed in West Germany. Although frustrated at what he described as the "authoritarian stupidity" of the army, it impacted his views on warrior ethics and warrior ideals. He retained his interest in Heathenry while a member of the army, and circa 1974 adopted the belief that there was an intrinsic connection between the Norse gods and humans of Northern European descent. After his discharge from the Army in 1976, McNallen hitchhiked across the Sahara Desert before returning to Europe and then to the United States. There, he settled in Berkeley, California.

=== Asatrú Free Assembly and journalistic career: 1976—1993 ===
"What makes metagenetics so difficult for many to accept is its base assumption: the tradition (i.e., culture) is a matter of genetic inheritance, and it is for this reason that the compulsion to reawaken the Northern Way has come upon some but not others. Put another way, the reason that the gods choose to act through individuals of a particular national and racial stock is that the religious heritage that the gods personify never died, but rather has been handed down from generation to generation—albeit in a dormant state—until a time that the gods deem propitious for the rebirth of the Norse/Germanic tradition."

— Scholar of religious studies Jeffrey Kaplan.

On his return to the United States in 1976 he transformed his Viking Brotherhood into the Asatrú Free Assembly (AFA). The sociologist of religion Jennifer Snook described it as "the first national Heathen organization in the United States", while according to the religious studies scholars Michael F. Strmiska and Baldur A. Sigurvinsson, the AFA "established many of the important organizational and ritual structures that remain operative" in American Heathenry into the 21st century. Initially meeting in the backroom of an insurance agency owned by group member Dick Johnson, the group later established a store-front office in Breckenridge, while through the AFA, McNallen continued publishing Runestone and produced booklets on Asatru. He also began conducting religious ceremonies, or blóts, and lectured at Pagan events across the U.S. He established groups known as guilds within the AFA to focus on particular endeavours, such as the Mead Brewing Guild and the Warrior Guild. The latter published a quarterly, Wolf Age, in which McNallen displayed his fascination for warrior ethics.

In the early 1980s McNallen used The Runestone to promote his theory of "metagenetics"; the idea that spirituality or religion was encoded in genetic material and thus passed down to one's descendants. In formulating this concept he was influenced by his reading of Jungian psychology with its concept of archetypes existing within a collective unconscious. Accordingly, he described "Ásatrú as an expression of the soul of our [Nordic] race", and thought that it was a "real mistake" for anyone not of Northern European ancestry to follow Heathenry. Not everyone in the AFA embraced this theory, with it being rejected for instance by prominent AFA member Robert Stine, although it would later be developed in new directions by the Heathen Edred Thorsson. Academic observers have characterised metagenetics as racist, and as pseudoscience.

One commentator noted that AFA membership at the time was largely a mix of hippies and neo-Nazis. As membership of the AFA grew, there were an increased number of internal conflicts, often along ideological lines. This was exacerbated by the fact that all affiliated groups, known as kindreds, were autonomous, while the AFA promoted an individualistic ethos which allowed for a diversity of opinions. This generated conflicts at the AFA's annual meetings, or Althings, for instance when Michael "Valgard" Murray—one of the neo-Nazis within the AFA—threatened to kill a fellow member of the Assembly because he was gay. McNallen did not share these Nazi sympathies, disapproving of the Nazi ideal of a centralized totalitarian state, which he believed was anathema to the Heathen ideal of freedom; he also wanted to keep his religion apart from become an adjunct to a specifically political movement. Accordingly, he sought to push out the neo-Nazis and other racial extremists from the group. In 1978 he demanded that AFA members be prohibited from wearing Nazi uniforms and insignia at their events. Among those who left the AFA as a result were Wyatt Kaldenberg—who was appalled by what he described as McNallen's "soft stance on race" and "middle of the road" politics—and the neo-Nazi Heathen Jost Turner, who was McNallen's brother-in-law. McNallen nevertheless remained close to Turner and his family after the division. As a result of such changes, by the late 1970s there was a clear division between McNallen's AFA, which emphasized religious over racial political aims, and Christensen's Odinist Fellowship, which placed far greater emphasis on the latter.

"One of the hardest-learned lessons from the old AFA ... was this: the time has not come for widespread public acceptance of Ásatrú. At one point we exposed a million or so readers to our beliefs in a newspaper article that was published coast-to-coast ... Nevertheless, we received exactly two inquiries as a result ... We must be content, for now, to grow slowly. We must seek quality rather than quantity."

— Stephen McNallen.

While the autonomous nature of different AFA-affiliated individuals and groups meant that McNallen and his wife Maddy Hutter had little power, they bore the brunt of the responsibility of running the Assembly and organizing its Althings. They were also impacted by a downturn in the Texan economy, with McNallen losing his job as a jail guard. Bankrupt and frustrated, McNallen and the other senior figures in the AFA found that they were unable to organise the group's seventh Althing for 1987. Seeking to ensure that it would continue regardless, McNallen assembled a committee of AFA members, the Southern Heathen Leadership Conference, which issued a document declaring that new membership would be frozen, that AFA responsibilities would be divided more widely, and that McNallen and Hutter should take a vacation from their organizational chores. However, in 1987 McNallen shut down The Runestone and dissolved the AFA altogether, relocating to Northern California. However, according to Strmiska and Sigurvinsson, the AFA had "planted seeds that would take strong root". As a replacement for the Assembly, Murray established the Asatru Alliance, which organised the eighth American Althing for Arizona in June 1988.

In 1986–87, McNallen worked as a peace officer in Stephens County Texas sheriff's office jail and Sheila kept books for an oil company. In 1986, he and Sheila moved to the semi-deserted mining town of Forest in the mountains of California, and there he earned teaching credentials before teaching science and mathematics at a junior high school for six years. During his summer vacations he travelled abroad, during which he met with guerrilla groups active in various parts of the world, writing articles about them for magazines like Soldier of Fortune. He later related that this experience convinced him of the need for ethnonationalism and ethnic separatism across the world. McNallen also joined the U.S. National Guard and was called up during the 1992 Los Angeles riots.

=== Return to Heathenry: 1994–2016 ===
In the mid-1990s, McNallen returned to an active involvement in the U.S. Pagan scene, aided by his new partner, Sheila Edlund. They established their own Heathen group, the Calasa Kindred, which they affiliated to Murray's AA. He was upset by the growth of The Troth, a universalist Heathen group that welcomed members regardless of ethnic or racial background. He later referred to this as "a corrupt faction" that "denied the innate connection of Germanic religions and Germanic people", expressing anger at the increasing domination of Heathenry by "liberals, affirmative-action Asatrúers, black goðar, and New Agers". In response to this, he decided to re-establish the AFA in 1994, this time calling it the Ásatrú Folk Assembly. This group based its headquarters in Grass Valley, and was structurally very similar to the old AFA, reviving McNallen's The Runestone publication, albeit in a yearbook format. The AFA served much the same constituency as the established AA, with religious studies scholar Jeffrey Kaplan believing that its purpose in the Heathen community was therefore largely superfluous. Seeking to promote Heathenry to a wider audience, McNallen also established the Ásatrú Community Church, which held Sunday services twice a month in the community room of the Nevada County Library; he later acknowledged that it was not particularly successful.

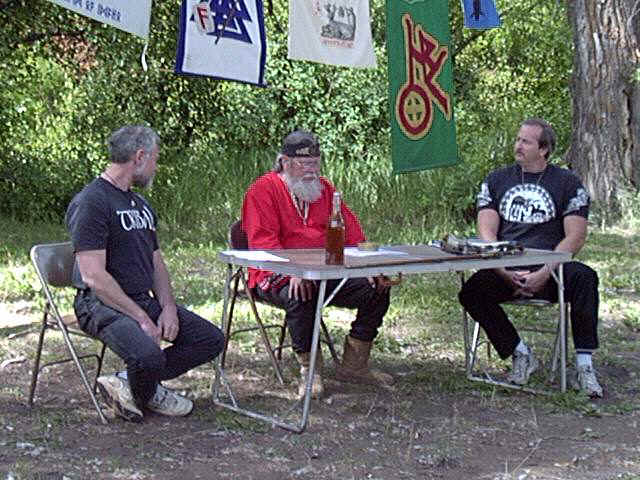
McNallen (left) with Michael "Valgard" Murray (center) and Eric "Hnikar" Wood at the 2000 IAOA Althing

During the 1990s, McNallen befriended the prominent Heathen Michael Moynihan, later recommending and selling Moynihan's journal Tyr on the AFA's website. McNallen and the AFA also appear to have cordial relations with the racial extremist Ron McVan, co-founder of Wotansvolk, publishing some of McVan's writings in Runestone. When in the 1990s, Christensen was arrested for drug smuggling, McNallen teamed up with Murray to form a defense fund for her. In September 1997 he was a signatory to the foundation of the International Asatru/Odinist Alliance (IAOA), a global union of folkish Heathen groups, alongside Murray of the AA and Heimgest of the British Odinic Rite; they were later joined by representatives of the French and German branches of the Odinic Rite, before the union terminated several years later. The alliance convened an international meeting, or Althing, every three years. In 1997, McNallen married Sheila Edlund at the seventeenth Althing, held in Utah; the ceremony was officiated by Murray. In 1999, the AFA purchased land in the higher Sierra of Northern California, there establishing a space where Heathen kindreds could meet together to practice their religion.

In keeping with his ethnonationalist beliefs, McNallen endorsed a 1993 Declaration of War Against Exploiters of Lakota Spirituality, expressing the opinion that white people should resurrect the religions of their European ancestors rather than adopting the belief systems of Native Americans. However, he came into conflict with Native American communities over the discovery of Kennewick Man, a prehistoric skeleton unearthed in Washington State; while local Native communities viewed the body as one of their ancestors and sought its repatriation to them, McNallen argued that it was Caucasian. In October 1996 the AFA filed a suit in the U.S. District Court of Portland to prevent Kennewick Man being given to the Native communities under the Native American Graves Protection and Repatriation Act (NAGPRA); the court ruled that the human remains were not "Native American" within the meaning of NAGPRA. McNallen expressed the view that Native American communities wanted to prevent forensic testing of the Kennewick Man's body because they feared that it would prove that he had been Caucasian, thus establishing that there had been a Caucasian presence in the prehistoric Americas. He believed that Caucasians had entered the Americas via the Bering Strait at around the same time as the ancestors of the Native Americans did, but that the Caucasians were subsequently wiped out; he warned that "that can happen to us too" and thus steps should be taken to preserve the existence of North America's European population. In 2000, the AFA withdrew from its involvement in the Kennewick Man legal case, stating that it had run out of funds to continue. The publicity surrounding the case nevertheless brought the AFA to far greater attention.

During the late 1990s, the AFA began promoting what it termed "tribalism", encouraging Heathens to form networks of extended families to help secure the religion's future. By mid-2001, McNallen and other figures in the leadership felt that they were again overworked and overstretched and so tried to reduce the group's hierarchical structure by abandoning the concept of membership. In the 21st century, the AFA made significant inroads online, establishing a homepage, blog, podcast, online radio, as well as accounts on Facebook and YouTube. Around the same time it began to promote the writings of Nouvelle Droite authors such as Alain de Benoist, selling an English-language translation of the latter's Being a Pagan on its website.

==== Growing political activity ====
"For years I had been a member of a group called the European American Issues Forum. The president of the organization resigned for health reasons, and I ended up filling his shoes. The EAIF was a great idea—a genuine, non-racist civil rights group for Americans of European descent—but in practice it was unworkable. The basic premise was simple: the social and political system could be made to respond to the needs of European-Americans just as it had responded to the demands of other racial groups. It took me a while to realize that no amount of letter writing or protesting was going to win any concessions from our opponents until there was a massive change in consciousness."

— Stephen McNallen, 2004.

At the turn of the 21st century, McNallen decided to embark on more specifically political activity, becoming President of the European American Issues Forum, a group devoted to advancing the rights of white Americans of which he had been a longstanding member. The group, a scholar of religion later noted, "rode the dangerous margins of racist politics." However, finding the job stressful and afflicted with colon cancer, he later resigned from the presidency.

In 2009 McNallen was invited to the International Asatru Summer Camp, but this was opposed by many of the groups attending, who argued that he should not be invited because of what they perceived as his racist views; a number of European Heathen groups, such as Norway's Bifrost and the Swedish SAS, threatened to boycott the event as a result of McNallen's invite.

In 2010, he contributed an article to the newly founded webzine AlternativeRight.com, founded by the white nationalist Richard B. Spencer, which was featured alongside articles by other white nationalists like Jared Taylor and Kevin B. MacDonald. Spencer noted that the initial articles for this website represented "the first stage" of the alt-right movement. In 2011, the AFA sent a contingent to the annual conference of a Spencer's white nationalist organization, the National Policy Institute, in what some figures close to McNallen revealed was an attempt to recruit members. After this incident was publicized it resulted in accusations of racism being levelled against McNallen and the AFA from various parts of the Pagan blogosphere.

In December 2012, McNallen created the Facebook page Green Asatru to promote environmental ideas within Heathenry. In June 2013 McNallen started the non-profit organization, Forever Elephants, to combat ivory poaching in Africa, using Facebook to promote this cause. In 2014, he retired from his profession as a juvenile corrections officer, where he had been employed for the previous five years. In 2015 he published Asatru: A Native European Spirituality; it was reviewed by the religious studies scholar Jefferson Calico for The Pomegranate: The International Journal of Pagan Studies, in which he noted that the book was "an important moment" for the Heathen movement, being "comprehensive and expansive, touching thoughtfully on numerous important aspects of the faith". Calico also noted that McNallen "clearly has his legacy in view throughout this book, apparent in the self-referential tone that occasionally surfaces."

=== Retirement: 2016–present ===
In 2016 McNallen stood down as head of the AFA, and was replaced by Matt Flavel, Allen Turnage, and Patricia Hall. He initially announced his desire to focus on new projects as a writer and religious leader. That year he angered many Universalist Heathens with a Facebook post responding to the sexual assault of white women by Arab men in Germany: "Germany — that is the German people, not sellout traitors like Merkel — deserve our full support... Where are the Freikorps when we need them?" The positive reference to the Freikorps, right-wing paramilitaries who carried out street violence and political assassinations between the World Wars, brought much criticism.

Several months after McNallen's resignation from the AFA leadership, the group posted a message online stating that: "The AFA would like to make it clear that we believe gender is not a social construct, it is a beautiful gift from the holy powers and from our ancestors. The AFA celebrates our feminine ladies, our masculine gentlemen, and, above all, our beautiful white children". The post brought accusations of racism; Heathens who had not commented on the AFA before denounced it. The AFA, in turn, called its critics "social justice warriors". In March 2017, McNallen spoke out on the issue in a YouTube video; here, he claimed allegiance to the white race and to white nationalist politics, also expressing allegiance to the 14 Words, a prominent slogan in white supremacist circles.

In 2018, the Southern Poverty Law Center added the Asatru Folk Assembly to its list of hate groups, describing it as a "Neo-völkisch hate group"

== Personality ==
Calico described McNallen as having "a highly eclectic personality, fascinated by political, cultural, technological, and occult issues." He characterized him as "a genuinely charismatic man who commands a presence" and who was also "a man of both vision and perseverance". He also noted that when McNallen was writing about himself (using the third person), he betrayed "the sort of narcissistic self-involvement that might characterize the psychology of a charismatic religious leader, the founder of a religious movement."

== Views on race and politics ==
"[McNallen's] vision all along has been that Asatru is the natural and native religion for the average American of North European ancestry: it expresses the authentic ethnic or folk identity of white Americans... McNallen's basic argument in "Metagenetics" is simple: a people's group religious and cultural experience over thousands of years becomes encoded into their DNA. Not only physical characteristics but information usually considered cultural, such as religion, is stored in the organic database of the genetic code."

— Jefferson F. Calico.

In an online video, McNallen insisted that "race is real. It is not a social construct", and has pointed to writers like Nicholas Wade in defense of this point. McNallen also believes in an integral link connecting one's genetic or racial heritage to one's religion. He thus considers the ancient religion of the Aztecs to be inscribed on the subconscious of contemporary Mexicans, and the ancient religion of the Norse to be inscribed on the subconscious of those descended from ancient North Europeans. He regards Heathenry as belonging to all people descended from ancient northern Europeans and wants to make it as accessible as possible to this demographic, arguing that it is the religion best suited to fill the spiritual yearning of many white Americans. While typically linking Heathenry to peoples descended from ancient Northern Europeans, in some contexts, McNallen has referred to a broader, pan-European identity, stating that "European cultures are all unique — unique that is, as variants on the basic European pattern."

He has sought to provide a theoretical basis for this Folkish Heathen belief, calling it "metagenetics". This is the belief that religious and cultural practices become encoded in DNA and are passed down the generations in this manner. He also ties this idea in with concepts drawn from Jungian psychology, arguing that archetypes are distinct to specific racial groups and are passed down genetically. While initially presenting this idea using scientific language during the 1980s, Calico noted that McNallen's later discussions on the subject appeared more like "race mysticism".

His motivation in devising "metagenetics" was, in part, to make his religion more appealing to a broader range of Americans and to distance his movement from neo-Nazi and other explicitly white supremacist movements who wanted to incorporate it into their ideas of race war. He has expressed the view that his AFA exhibits the "middle ground on racial issues. On the one hand we were proud of our European heritage, and we actively espoused the interests of European-descended peoples. On the other hand we opposed totalitarianism and racial hatred, convinced that decency and honor required us to treat individuals of all racial groups with respect." According to a 1998 Southern Poverty Law Center article, although McNallen has attempted to evade the "Nazi-Odinist identification", he has "expressed sympathy with what he sees as the "legitimate frustrations of white men who are concerned for their kind".

"The spiritual descendants of the Aztecs are looking northward, coveting land which, they have convinced themselves, should be theirs–and, perhaps quite unconsciously, they are moving to conquer it by mass immigration, by language, by cultural influence. A dangerous few want to conquer it by force of arms. But then, they haven't reckoned with Odin and Thor, and Frey and Freya, or the other mighty powers of Asgard and Vanaheim! Nor have they figured, in their calculus of conflict, on the spiritual will of those who follow them."

— Stephen McNallen.

For McNallen, white Americans are essentially Europeans because of their genetic ancestry. He has penned articles on what he fears is the coming extinction of the white race, arguing that in the United States, white people will be largely replaced by Hispanics, with the concomitant demographic shift resulting in a decreased political influence for the country's white population. He claims that a lack of clear ethnic identity has left European-Americans in a socially disadvantaged position, claiming that: "The results are clear for all to see, more of us are dying than are being born, our children look to other peoples and cultures for their models, our heritage and history are steadily displaced. This is the road to marginalization and extinction." According to Snook, McNallen's concerns reflect "white American resentment of a perceived loss of status and privilege in modern, multicultural society in particularly divisive political times." She added that a repeated element of his argument, the presentation of white people as victims, was common throughout white supremacist discourse.

McNallen does not consider himself to be a racist, arguing that "racism" entails expressing a belief in racial superiority, a viewpoint he does not hold. He insists that his support for racial separatism does not necessitate a "dislike, much less hatred" for other racial groups. However, in May 2015, the magazine Vice published an article in which it accused McNallen of being a racist who manipulated ancient Norse beliefs "for his own hateful devices". The "American Heathen collective" Circle Ansuz issued articles in which they described McNallen as "an active participant in the American neo-fascist radical traditionalist movement" and "an unapologetic advocate for white nationalism". Conversely, many in the extreme racialist wing of Heathenry have accused McNallen of being a race traitor because he has not unequivocally endorsed white supremacist and neo-Nazi perspectives; they have commented negatively on his "refusal to work for the survival of the Aryan race" and accused him of promoting "cowardly PC politics".

The religious studies scholar Jeffrey Kaplan stated that McNallen's politics "fit comfortably into the right wing of the political spectrum", although added that in the Heathen community McNallen "suddenly becomes very much the man of the centre – and is thus a legitimate target for both sides." The historian of religion Mattias Gardell characterized McNallen as a libertarian. McNallen rejects the descriptor "conservative", expressing the view that there is little in modern Western society worthy of conserving. McNallen envisions a future stateless American confederacy based on ecologically sustainable, decentralized tribal groups. He has also expressed support for all ethnic separatist movements across the world, including those of the Tibetan, Igbo, Karen, and Afrikaner people. This has attracted criticism from the racial extremist wing of the Heathen community, who have claimed that it detracts from the focus on the white or Aryan struggle against other racial groups. According to Katja Lane, co-founder of the extreme racialist Wotansvolk, McNallen is "promoting everything BUT the Aryan cause." However, in writings and YouTube videos, Stephen McNallen has spoken favorably of Wotanism and the Fourteen Words of David Lane, networking with Red Ice TV, a social media outlet of the alt-right.

== Reception and legacy ==
Calico noted that McNallen represented the "torchbearer" for Folkish Heathenry in the United States. He added that McNallen's was the "one name associated with the birth, growth, and controversy of American Asatru" more than any other. Some U.S. Heathens regard him as the "father" of American Heathenry, although his place in the movement is disputed by many practitioners who reject his Folkish approach to the religion. Calico thought that "McNallen deserves to be noted as one of many American religious dissenters who, because of strong personal conviction and vision, stood their ground in the face of hardship and opposition."

== Bibliography ==
A bibliography of McNallen's works have been provided on the AFA's website:

Year of publication	Title	Co-author(s)	Publisher
1985	What is Asatru?	–	Unknown
1985	The Values of Asatru	–	Unknown
1992	Rituals of Asatru 3 vols.	–	World Tree Publications
1993	Thunder from the North: The Way of the Teutonic Warrior	–	Asatru Folk Assembly
1993	A Book of Uncommon Prayers	Maddy Hutter	Unknown
1993	A Runic Inspiration	Maddy Hutter	Unknown
1997	Asatru: The Soul and Initiation	–	Unknown
2006	The Philosophy of Metagenetics, Folkism and Beyond	–	Asatru Folk Assembly
2009	Asatru Book of Blotar and Rituals	–	CreateSpace Independent Publishing Platform
2015	Asatru: A Native European Spirituality	–	Runestone Press
