= Asatru Folk Assembly =

American heathenry organization

- The interlaced horn design from the Danish Snoldelev stone was adopted as the official symbol of the AFA in October 2006.
- Abbreviation: AFA
- Type: New Religious Movement
- Classification: Neopaganism
- Orientation: Heathenry
- Theology: Folkism
- Allsherjargoði: Matthew D. Flavel
- Headquarters: Brownsville, California
- Founder: Stephen A. McNallen
- Origin: 1995
- Hofs: 5
- Members: 730 (self claim)
- Clergy: 19
- Official website: www.runestone.org

The Asatru Folk Assembly (AFA) is an international Heathen organization based in the United States. It was founded by Stephen A. McNallen in 1994. Once headquartered in Grass Valley, California, with chapters worldwide, the AFA is recognized as a 501(c)(3) nonprofit religious organization.

The Asatru Folk Assembly practices a form of Heathenry, a modern Pagan religion, centred around the deities from Old Norse religion. Many of the rituals that AFA members devote to these deities were devised by McNallen. The AFA promotes a form of Heathenry called "folkish", meaning that they consider the religion to only be suitable for white people of Germanic ancestry. Its views on race have been labelled racist or white supremacist by some observers.

McNallen formed the Viking Brotherhood in Texas at the start of the 1970s. In 1976, when he had relocated to California, he converted it into the Ásatrú Free Assembly, which was the first national Heathen organisation in the United States. Through this group, he promoted his theory of "metagenetics", the notion that the worship of certain deities is connected to racial heredity. Stressed by internal tensions in the group and the substantial workload, McNallen closed this organisation in 1986. Concerned that new Heathen groups like The Troth had begun promoting a vision of Heathenry that was inclusive towards non-white individuals, in 1994 McNallen established the Asatru Folk Assembly. Over subsequent years, the AFA gained greater attention for making claims to the Kennewick Man body. In 2016, McNallen stepped down as leader of the group.

The organization currently has five active temples. As of April 2025, it claimed to have had approximately 730 members. The AFA's critics include external organisations like the Southern Poverty Law Center and Anti-Defamation League as well as other Heathen groups, like The Troth, which reject folkish approaches to ethnicity. These critics have argued that the AFA is a hate group.

== Definition ==
Heathenry has been defined as "a broad contemporary Pagan new religious movement (NRM) that is consciously inspired by the linguistically, culturally, and (in some definitions) ethnically 'Germanic' societies of Iron Age and early medieval Europe as they existed prior to Christianization". The AFA is part of the folkish wing of Heathenry. This means that they believe that a person needs to be racially descended from ancient Germanic populations to worship the Old Norse gods. This differs from the universalist Heathen stance, which argues that anyone can venerate these deities.

== History ==
=== McNallen and the Viking Brotherhood ===
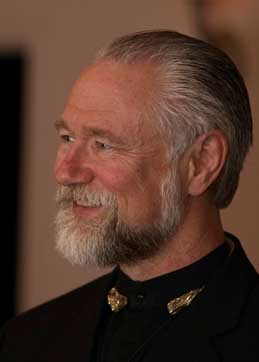
Stephen McNallen, the founder of the AFA, in 2005

McNallen was born in 1948 in Breckenridge, Texas to a Roman Catholic family. After high school, he attended Midwestern State University in Wichita Falls, Texas. There, he explored alternative religions, reading about the modern Pagan religion of Wicca and the writings of the occultist Aleister Crowley. In his freshman year of college he read a novel, Edison Marshall's The Viking, which generated his interest in pre-Christian Scandinavia. According to McNallen, upon reading this book he "got hooked on the spirit of the North". In 1968 or 1969 he dedicated himself to the worship of the deities found in Norse mythology, remaining a solitary devotee of theirs for about two years.

In 1969–70, McNallen founded the Viking Brotherhood. He issued a "Viking Manifesto" in which he stated that the Brotherhood was "dedicated to preserving, promoting and practicing the Norse religion as it was epitomized during the Viking Age, and to further the moral and ethical values of courage, individualism, and independence which characterized the Viking way of life." While the group placed greater emphasis on promoting what McNallen perceived as the Viking ideals — "courage, honor, and freedom" — than on explicitly religious goals, in 1972 they gained tax-exempt status as a religious organization from the Internal Revenue Service. In the winter of 1971–72 he began publishing a newsletter, The Runestone, using a typewriter and mimeograph machine; he gained his first eleven subscribers through an advert placed in Fate magazine.

McNallen initially called his Heathen tradition "Norse religion", before later adopting the term "Odinism" from the work of Danish Heathen and far-right activist Else Christensen. He then changed it once again, this time to "Asatru", which he had discovered in Magnus Magnusson's book, Hammer of the North, and subsequently popularized within the American Heathen community.

=== The Asatrú Free Assembly ===
Having relocated to Berkeley, California, in 1976 McNallen transformed his Viking Brotherhood into the Asatrú Free Assembly (AFA). The sociologist of religion Jennifer Snook described it as "the first national Heathen organization in the United States". According to the religious studies scholars Michael F. Strmiska and Baldur A. Sigurvinsson, the AFA "established many of the important organizational and ritual structures that remain operative" in American Heathenry into the 21st century. Initially meeting in the backroom of an insurance agency owned by group member Dick Johnson, the group later established a store-front office in Breckenridge. Through the AFA, McNallen continued publishing Runestone and produced booklets on Asatru. He also began conducting religious ceremonies, or blóts, and lectured at Pagan events across the U.S. He established groups known as guilds within the AFA to focus on particular endeavors, such as the Mead Brewing Guild and the Warrior Guild. The latter published a quarterly, Wolf Age, in which McNallen displayed his fascination for warrior ethics.

"One of the hardest-learned lessons from the old AFA ... was this: the time has not come for widespread public acceptance of Ásatrú. At one point we exposed a million or so readers to our beliefs in a newspaper article that was published coast-to-coast ... Nevertheless, we received exactly two inquiries as a result ... We must be content, for now, to grow slowly. We must seek quality rather than quantity."

— Stephen McNallen.

In the early 1980s McNallen used The Runestone to promote "metagenetics", his theory that spirituality or religion was encoded in genetic material and thus passed down to one's descendants. In formulating this concept he was influenced by his reading of Jungian psychology with its concept of archetypes existing within a collective unconscious. Accordingly, he described "Ásatrú as an expression of the soul of our [Nordic] race", and thought that it was a "real mistake" for anyone not of Northern European ancestry to follow Heathenry. Academic observers have characterised metagenetics as racist, and as pseudoscience.

One commentator noted that AFA membership at the time was largely a mix of hippies and neo-Nazis. As membership grew, there were an increased number of internal conflicts, often along ideological lines. This was exacerbated by the fact that all affiliated groups, known as kindreds, were autonomous, while the AFA promoted an individualistic ethos which allowed for a diversity of opinions. This generated conflicts at the AFA's annual meetings, or Althings, for instance when Michael "Valgard" Murray—one of the AFA's neo-Nazis—threatened to kill a fellow AFA member because he was gay. McNallen did not share these Nazi sympathies, disapproving of the Nazi ideal of a centralized totalitarian state, which he believed was anathema to the Heathen ideal of freedom; he also wanted to stop his religion becoming an adjunct to a specifically political movement. Accordingly, he sought to eject the neo-Nazis from the group. In 1978 he prohibited AFA members from wearing Nazi uniforms and insignia at their events.

While the autonomous nature of different AFA-affiliated individuals and groups meant that McNallen and his wife Maddy Hutter had little power, they bore the brunt of the responsibility of running the Assembly and organizing its Althings. They were also impacted by a downturn in the Texan economy, with McNallen losing his job as a jail guard. Bankrupt and frustrated, McNallen and the other senior AFA figures found themselves unable to organise the group's seventh Althing for 1987. Seeking to ensure that it would continue, McNallen assembled a committee of AFA members, the Southern Heathen Leadership Conference, which issued a document declaring that new membership would be frozen, that AFA responsibilities would be divided more widely, and that McNallen and Hutter should take a vacation from their organizational chores. However, in 1987 McNallen shut down The Runestone and dissolved the AFA altogether, relocating to Northern California. Replacing the Assembly, Murray established the Asatru Alliance (AA), which organised the eighth American Althing for Arizona in June 1988.

=== Foundation of the Asatru Folk Assembly ===
"[McNallen] formed the Asatru Folk Assembly (AFA) in 1994 with the combination of a clearly enunciated folkish perspective and a tight centralized organization, with him firmly ensconced as the charismatic leader of the movement. He sought to rescue the movement from the progressive politics that he saw as threatening the essential nature of [Heathenry]."

— Scholar of religion Jefferson F. Calico

In the mid-1990s, McNallen returned to an active involvement in the U.S. Pagan scene, aided by his new partner, Sheila Edlund. They established their own Heathen group, the Calasa Kindred, which they affiliated to Murray's AA. McNallen was upset by the growth of The Troth, a universalist Heathen group that welcomed members regardless of ethnic or racial background. He later referred to this as "a corrupt faction" that "denied the innate connection of Germanic religions and Germanic people", expressing anger at the increasing domination of Heathenry by "liberals, affirmative-action Asatrúers, black goðar, and New Agers". In response to this, he decided to re-establish the AFA in 1994, this time calling it the Ásatrú Folk Assembly.

This new AFA based its headquarters in Grass Valley, and was structurally very similar to the old AFA, reviving McNallen's The Runestone publication, albeit in a yearbook format. The AFA served much the same constituency as the established AA, with religious studies scholar Jeffrey Kaplan believing that its purpose in the Heathen community was therefore largely superfluous. Seeking to promote Heathenry to a wider audience, McNallen also established the Ásatrú Community Church, which held Sunday services twice a month in the community room of the Nevada County Library; he later acknowledged that it was not particularly successful.

=== International links and the Kennewick Man controversy ===
McNallen maintained links with many other folkish Heathens throughout the 1990s. That decade, he befriended the prominent Heathen Michael Moynihan, later recommending and selling Moynihan's journal Tyr on the AFA's website. He retained friendly links with Murray and his AA, and displayed cordial relations with the racial extremist Ron McVan, co-founder of Wotansvolk, by publishing some of McVan's writings in Runestone. When in the 1990s, Christensen was arrested for drug smuggling, McNallen teamed up with Murray to form a defense fund for her. With Murray and Jeff "Heimgest" Holley of the British Odinic Rite, in September 1997 McNallen formed the International Asatru/Odinist Alliance (IAOA), a global union of folkish Heathen groups. They were later joined by representatives of the French and German branches of the Odinic Rite, before the union terminated several years later. The alliance convened an international meeting, or Althing, every three years.

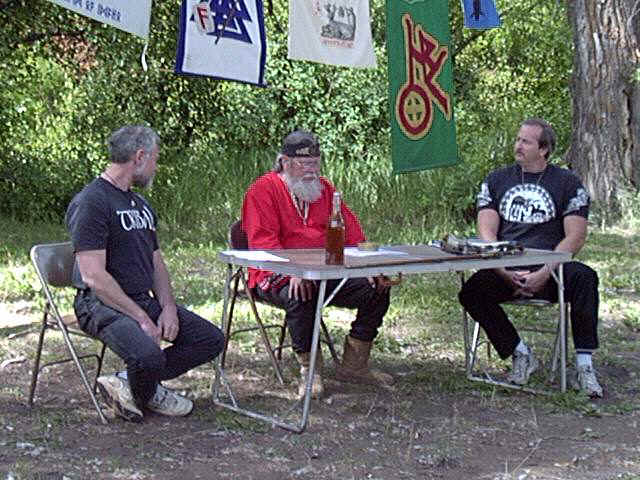
McNallen (left) with Michael "Valgard" Murray (center) and Eric "Hnikar" Wood at the 2000 IAOA Althing

In keeping with his ethnonationalist beliefs, McNallen endorsed a 1993 Declaration of War Against Exploiters of Lakota Spirituality, expressing the opinion that white people should resurrect the religions of their European ancestors rather than adopting the belief systems of Native Americans. However, he came into conflict with Native American communities over the discovery of Kennewick Man, a prehistoric skeleton unearthed in Washington State; while local Native communities viewed the body as one of their ancestors and sought its repatriation to them, McNallen argued that it was Caucasian. In October 1996 the AFA filed a suit in the U.S. District Court of Portland to prevent Kennewick Man being given to the Native communities under the Native American Graves Protection and Repatriation Act (NAGPRA); the court ruled that the human remains were not "Native American" within the meaning of NAGPRA. McNallen expressed the view that Native American communities wanted to prevent forensic testing of the Kennewick Man's body because they feared that it would prove that he had been Caucasian, thus establishing that there had been a Caucasian presence in the prehistoric Americas. He believed that Caucasians had entered the Americas via the Bering Strait at around the same time as the ancestors of the Native Americans did, but that the Caucasians were subsequently wiped out; he warned that "that can happen to us too" and thus steps should be taken to preserve the existence of North America's European population. In 2000, the AFA withdrew from its involvement in the Kennewick Man legal case, stating that it had run out of funds to continue. The publicity surrounding the case nevertheless brought the AFA to far greater attention. Later testing showed that Kennewick Man is "very closely related" to the Colville tribe of northeastern Washington.

During the late 1990s, the AFA began promoting what it termed "tribalism", encouraging Heathens to form networks of extended families to help secure the religion's future. In 1999, the AFA purchased land in the higher Sierra of Northern California, there establishing a space where Heathen kindreds could meet together to practice their religion.

By mid-2001, McNallen and other figures in the leadership felt that they were again overworked and overstretched and so tried to reduce the group's hierarchical structure by abandoning the concept of membership. There were certain power struggles within the group; in the late 2000s, Mark Stinson, who was an AFA "Folkbuilder" in the Midwest, was expelled from the group. Stinson and other Heathen observers argued that he was removed because his popularity and success was seen as a threat to McNallen's leadership. In the 21st century, the AFA made significant inroads online, establishing a homepage, blog, podcast, online radio, as well as accounts on Facebook and YouTube. Around the same time it began to promote the writings of Nouvelle Droite authors such as Alain de Benoist, selling an English-language translation of the latter's Being a Pagan on its website.

=== New leadership ===
In 2016 McNallen stood down as the AFA's head, to be replaced by Matt Flavel, Allen Turnage, and Patricia Hall. That year, McNallen angered many Universalist Heathens with a Facebook post making positive reference to the Freikorps, German right-wing paramilitaries who carried out street violence and political assassinations between the World Wars. Several months later, the AFA posted an online message stating that "The AFA would like to make it clear that we believe gender is not a social construct, it is a beautiful gift from the holy powers and from our ancestors. The AFA celebrates our feminine ladies, our masculine gentlemen, and, above all, our beautiful white children". The post brought accusations of racism; Heathens who had not commented on the AFA before denounced it. The AFA, in turn, called its critics "social justice warriors". In March 2017, McNallen spoke out on the issue in a YouTube video; here, he claimed allegiance to the white race, white nationalism. and the 14 Words, a prominent slogan in white supremacist circles. In May 2017, Facebook deleted the AFA's primary social media outlet, citing hate speech as the reason.

In December 2019, two members of the Army National Guard left the military under uncertain terms related to their involvement as leaders of "Ravensblood Kindred", a part of the AFA. It was reported that it endorses white nationalist views. Both had previously attended a rally by Richard B. Spencer. One was on active duty in Afghanistan and one worked as a jailer for the Haralson County but was not terminated from his position. One member, East, now holds a leadership position at the Njordshof hof.

On August 10, 2024, Zachary Babitz, a member of the Asatru Folk Assembly, was arrested in Las Cruces, New Mexico, for allegedly committing several violent crimes, including murder, carjacking, and robbery, throughout New Mexico earlier that month. The group previously described Babitz, who had "1488" tattooed on his hand, as "the newest apprentice Folkbuilder for the Ódinshof District". On 17 April 2026, Babitz pled guilty to multiple counts of armed robbery, grand theft auto, and a single count of murder. He was sentenced to life imprisonment.

== Teachings ==
The AFA sees its mission as one of "calling back" people of European descent to the worship of Old Norse deities. As noted by the scholar Jefferson F. Calico, it also works toward "popularising Heathen ideas within the cultural mainstream".

McNallen long had an interest in ritual and integrated various ceremonies into the AFA system. He published several manuals outlining Heathen rituals for his followers, including Rituals of Asatru and Twelve Nights of Yule.

== Organization ==
Since 2013, the AFA has owned rights to many of the books of "Edred Thorsson" (a pen name of Stephen Flowers).

To train its clergy, the AFA established its Gothar Program. As with other Heathen organisations like the Troth and the Odinic Rite, the AFA has a clergy training program whose participants are expected to read widely. To build its national and international presence, the AFA formed a network of individuals it called Folkbuilders, who have served as official representatives of the group in their respective regions. In 2017, the AFA had about 20 Folkbuilders, including two outside the United States, in Sweden and in New Zealand.

=== AFA places of worship ===
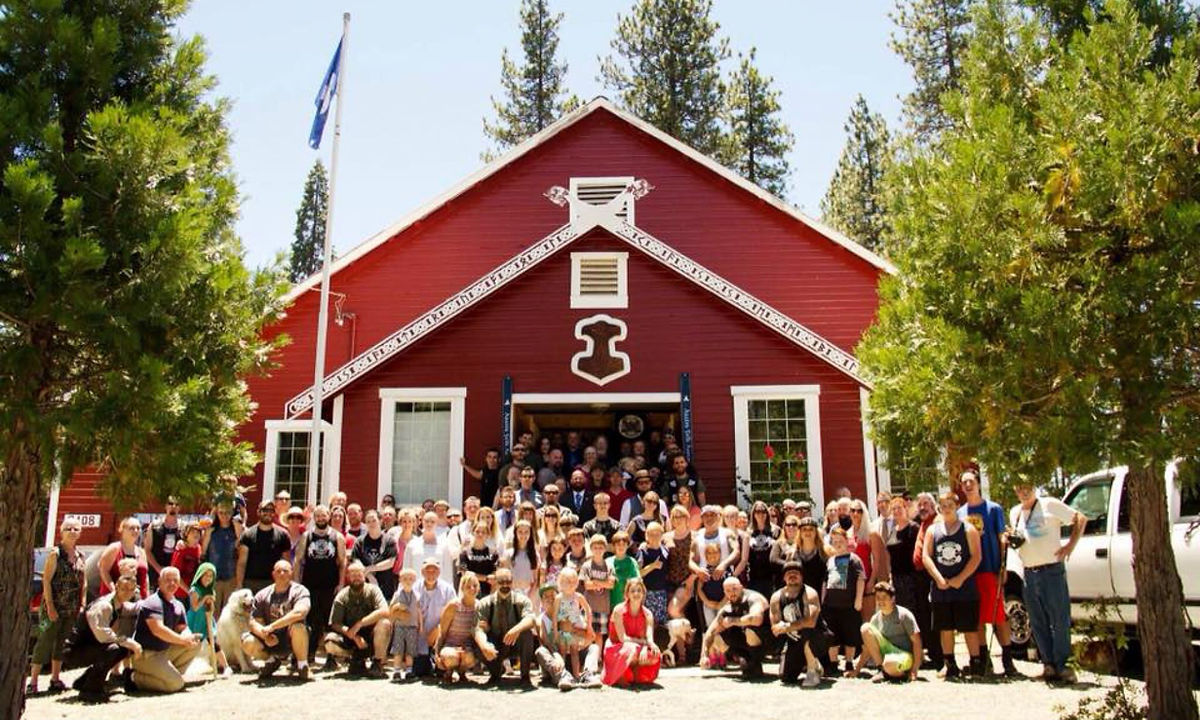
Odinshof, in Brownsville, California

In August 2015, the AFA acquired a former Grange Hall in Brownsville, California, about 40 miles from Grass Valley, where the group was founded. The hall was built in 1938, and was purchased to be used as a hof and community center under the name Newgrange Hall Asatru Hof. It was previously the Youth Center of the Mountaintop Christian Academy of California, and at another time the Marge Moore Youth Center. This first hof has since been named Odinshof, in dedication to the god Odin.

In April 2020, the AFA acquired a former church in Linden, North Carolina, which has been turned into a heathen hof serving AFA members in the Southeastern United States. This second hof is named Thorshof, in dedication to the god Thor.

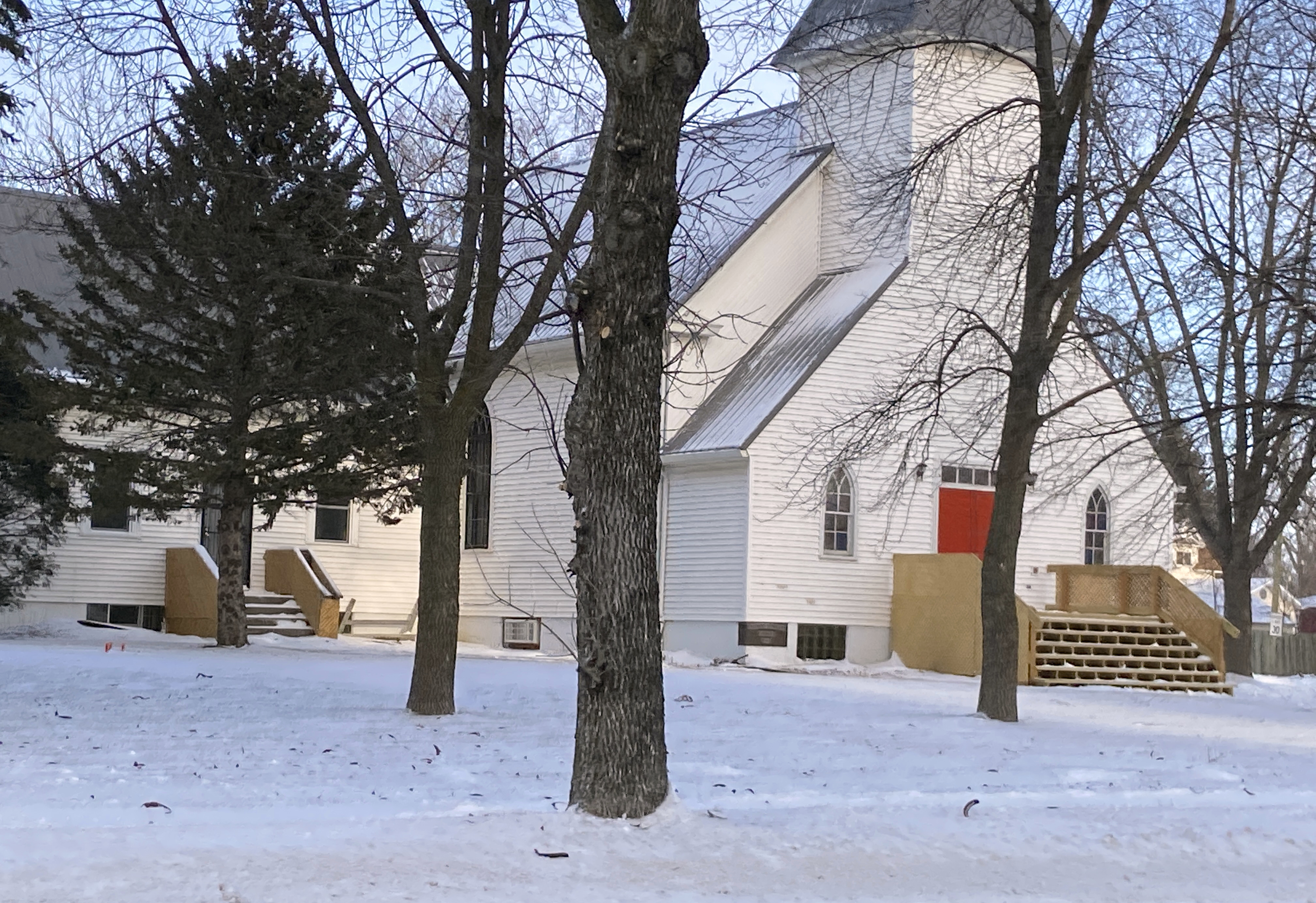
Baldrshof, in Murdock, Minnesota

In June 2020, the AFA purchased a former Lutheran church in Murdock, Minnesota, to be used as gathering place for AFA members of the Northern Great Plains. In December 2020, the Murdock City Council gave the AFA conditional approval to use the church. More than 120,000 Minnesotans have signed a petition to stop the group's use of the building. This third hof is named Baldrshof, in dedication to the god Baldr.

In 2022, the AFA purchased a former church in White Springs, Florida, to serve as a hof for AFA members in the Southern United States. The AFA operates a monthly food pantry for the local community there. This fourth hof has been named Njordshof, in dedication to the god Njörðr.

In September 2025, Freyshof was announced as the fifth Hof of the Asatru Folk Assembly, located in Austintown, Ohio. The Hof was dedicated in December.

== Reception ==
In 2018, Calico noted that the AFA had "emerged as the primary ideological competitor to the Troth" within Heathenry.

In 2018, the Southern Poverty Law Center added the AFA to its list of hate groups as part of a new category called "neo-Völkisch". The Anti-Defamation League lists the AFA as an "extremist group".

The AFA is considered a white nationalist organization, with a racist approach to their religious practices. The organization has expressed blood and soil ideologies, and is often called a far-right organization. The Southern Poverty Law Center has designated the AFA as a hate group, while the Anti-Defamation League says the group "practices modern Norse paganism with a white supremacist slant".

As a result of the discriminatory activities of the AFA, numerous Heathen and neo-pagan organizations sought to produce a document refuting these beliefs and the characterization that they represented these faiths. The product was Declaration 127, which specifically condemns the AFA. This declaration has been criticized for its specific focus on the AFA, and efforts have been made to expand it. One alternative to Declaration 127 is the "Declaration of Deeds", a much wider-ranging statement against discrimination and hate in Heathenism.

== See also ==
- Far-right politics
- List of white nationalist organizations
