= Eclectic paganism =

Form of modern paganism

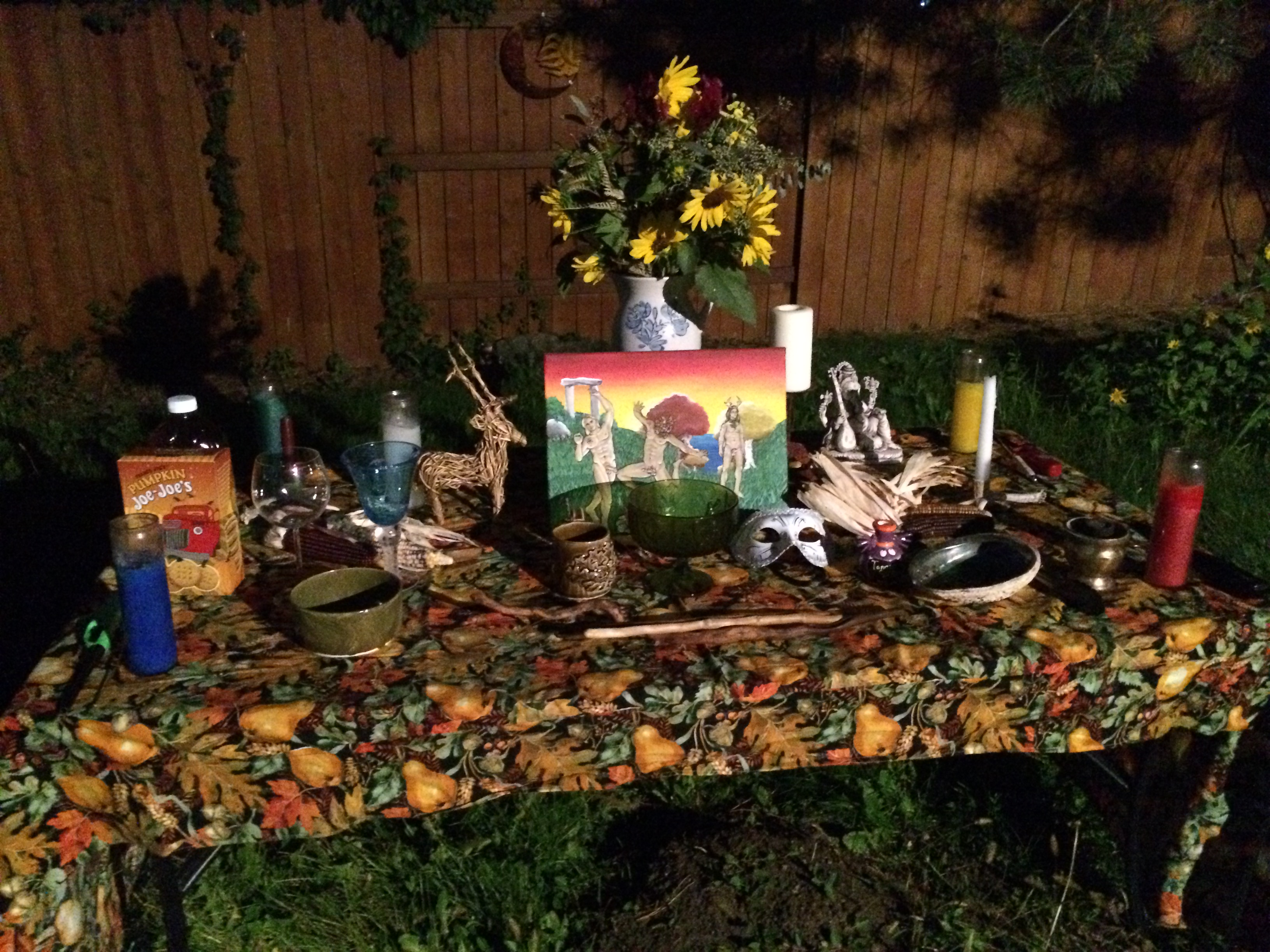
Mabon-Fall Equinox 2015 Altar by the Salt Lake Pagan Society of Salt Lake City, UT. Displayed are seasonal decorations, altar tools, elemental candles, flowers, deity statues, cookies and juice offerings, and a nude Gods painting of Thor, the Green Man, and Cernunnos dancing around a Mabon Fire.

Eclectic paganism, also occasionally termed universalist or non-denominational paganism, is a form of modern paganism where practitioners blend paganism with aspects of other religions or philosophies, including the blending of separate pagan traditions. In the book Handbook of New Age, Melissa Harrington states that "Eclectic Pagans do not follow any particular Paganism, but follow a Pagan religious path, that includes the overall Pagan ethos of reverence for the ancient Gods, participation in a magical world view, stewardship and caring for the Earth, and 'nature religion.'" The practice of eclectic paganism is particularly popular with pagans in North America and the British Isles.

Eclectic paganism contrasts with reconstructionist paganism: whereas reconstructionists strive for authenticity to historical religious traditions of specific groups or time periods, the eclectic approach borrows from several different cultures, philosophies, and time periods.

Some see benefits and drawbacks to the eclectic pagan label. It is broad and allows for various practices and beliefs and without concrete rules, practitioners can explore various religions, philosophies, practices, and cultures while remaining within the bounds of the label. Some also create their own beliefs, philosophies, and rules.

== See also ==
- Neopaganism in the United Kingdom
- Neopaganism in the United States
