= Modern paganism =

Religions shaped by historical paganism

Slavic Rodnovery (Slavic Cross)	Celtic neopaganism (Triskele/triple spiral)	Germanic Heathenism (Thor's Hammer)	Dievturība (Latvian Dievturi)
Wicca (Pentagram)	Kemetism ('anhk', key of life)	Armenian Hetanism ('Arevakhach')	Finnish neo-paganism ('Tursaansydän')
Hellenism ('Laurel wreath')	Estonian neopaganism ('Jumiõis', cornflower)	Hungarian Neopaganism ('világfa')	Druidry (The 'Awen')

Modern paganism, also known as neopaganism and contemporary paganism, is a range of new religious movements variously influenced by the indigenous beliefs of pre-modern peoples across Europe, North Africa, and the Near East. Despite some common similarities, contemporary pagan movements are diverse, sharing no single set of beliefs, practices, or religious texts. Scholars of religion may study the phenomenon as a movement divided into different religions, while others study neopaganism as a decentralized religion with an array of denominations.

Adherents rely on pre-Christian, folkloric, and ethnographic sources to a variety of degrees; many of them follow a spirituality that they accept as entirely modern, while others draw on prehistoric beliefs or attempt to revive indigenous religions as accurately as possible. Modern pagan movements are frequently described on a spectrum ranging from reconstructive, which seeks to revive historical pagan religions, to eclectic movements, which blend elements from various religions and philosophies with historical paganism. Polytheism, animism, and pantheism are common features across pagan theology. Modern pagans can also include atheists, upholding virtues and principles associated with paganism while maintaining a secular worldview. Humanistic, naturalistic, or secular pagans may recognize deities as archetypes or useful metaphors for different cycles of life, or reframe magic as a purely psychological practice.

Contemporary paganism has been associated with the New Age movement, with scholars highlighting their similarities as well as their differences. The academic field of pagan studies began to coalesce in the 1990s, emerging from disparate scholarship in the preceding two decades. Some examples of notable neopagan traditions are listed below, along with their major symbols.

== Terminology ==
=== Definition ===
There is "considerable disagreement as to the precise definition and the proper usage" of the term modern paganism. Even within the academic field of pagan studies, there is no consensus about how contemporary paganism can best be defined. Most scholars describe modern paganism as a broad array of different religions, not a single one. The category of modern paganism could be compared to the categories of Abrahamic religions and Indian religions in its structure. A second, less common definition found within pagan studies—promoted by the religious studies scholars Michael F. Strmiska and Graham Harvey—characterises modern paganism as a single religion, of which groups like Wicca, Druidry, and Heathenry are denominations. This perspective has been critiqued, given the lack of core commonalities in issues such as theology, cosmology, ethics, afterlife, holy days, or ritual practices within the pagan movement.

Contemporary paganism has been defined as "a collection of modern religious, spiritual, and magical traditions that are self-consciously inspired by the pre-Judaic, pre-Christian, and pre-Islamic belief systems of Europe, North Africa, and the Near East." Thus it has been said that although it is "a highly diverse phenomenon", "an identifiable common element" nevertheless runs through the pagan movement. Strmiska described paganism as a movement "dedicated to reviving the polytheistic, nature-worshipping pagan religions of pre-Christian Europe and adapting them for the use of people in modern societies." The religious studies scholar Wouter Hanegraaff characterised paganism as encompassing "all those modern movements which are, first, based on the conviction that what Christianity has traditionally denounced as idolatry and superstition actually represents/represented a profound and meaningful religious worldview and, secondly, that a religious practice based on this worldview can and should be revitalized in our modern world."

Discussing the relationship between the different pagan religions, religious studies scholars Kaarina Aitamurto and Scott Simpson wrote that they were "like siblings who have taken different paths in life but still retain many visible similarities". But there has been much "cross-fertilization" between these different faiths: many groups have influenced, and been influenced by, other pagan religions, making clear-cut distinctions among them more difficult for scholars to make. The various pagan religions have been academically classified as new religious movements, with the anthropologist Kathryn Rountree describing paganism as a whole as a "new religious phenomenon". A number of academics, particularly in North America, consider modern paganism a form of nature religion.

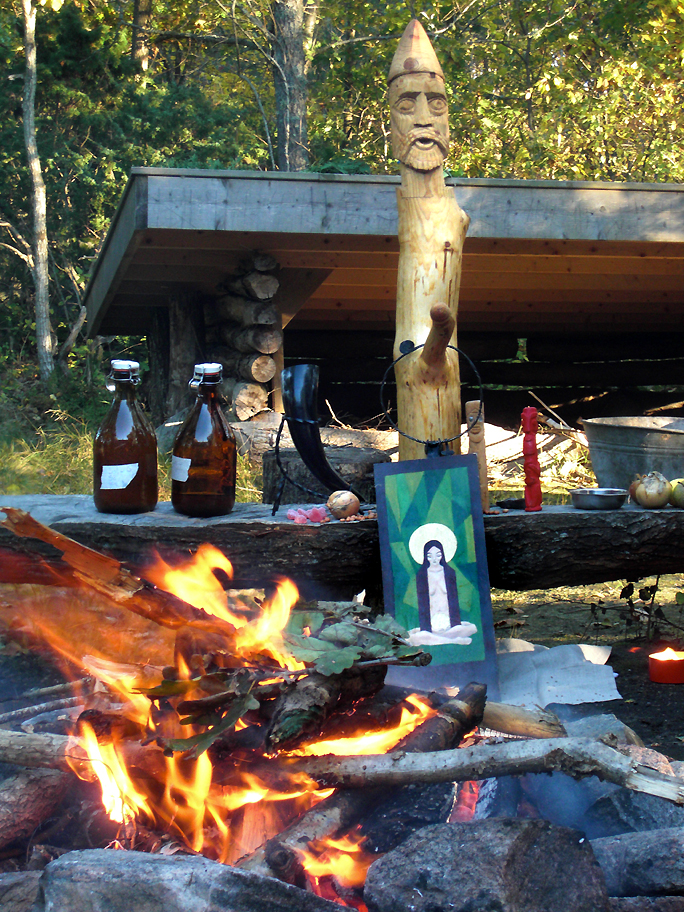
Heathen altar for Haustblot in Björkö, Sweden. The larger wooden idol represents the god Frey.

Some practitioners completely eschew the use of the term pagan, preferring to use more specific names for their religion, such as "Heathen" or "Wiccan". This is because the term pagan originates in Christian terminology, which individuals who object to the term wish to avoid. Some favor the term "ethnic religion"; the World Pagan Congress, founded in 1998, soon renamed itself the European Congress of Ethnic Religions (ECER), enjoying that term's association with the Greek ethnos and the academic field of ethnology. Within linguistically Slavic areas of Europe, the term "Native Faith" is often favored as a synonym for paganism, rendered as Ridnovirstvo in Ukrainian, Rodnoverie in Russian, and Rodzimowierstwo in Polish. Alternately, many practitioners in these regions view "Native Faith" as a category within modern paganism that does not encompass all pagan religions. Other terms some pagans favor include "traditional religion", "indigenous religion", "nativist religion", and "reconstructionism".

Various pagans who are active in pagan studies, such as Michael York and Prudence Jones, have argued that, due to the similarities of their worldviews, the modern pagan movement can be treated as part of the same global phenomenon as pre-Christian Ancient religions, living Indigenous religions, and world religions like Hinduism, Shinto, and Afro-American religions. They have also suggested that these could all be included under the rubric of "paganism". This approach has been received critically by many specialists in religious studies. Critics have pointed out that such claims would cause problems for analytic scholarship by lumping together belief systems with very significant differences, and that the term would serve modern pagan interests by making the movement appear far larger on the world stage. Doyle White writes that modern religions that draw upon the pre-Christian belief systems of other parts of the world, such as Sub-Saharan Africa or the Americas, cannot be seen as part of the contemporary pagan movement, which is "fundamentally Eurocentric". Similarly, Strmiska stresses that modern paganism should not be conflated with the belief systems of the world's Indigenous peoples because the latter lived under colonialism and its legacy, and that while some pagan worldviews bear similarities to those of indigenous communities, they stem from "different cultural, linguistic, and historical backgrounds".

=== Reappropriation of "paganism" ===
Many scholars have favored the use of "neopaganism" to describe this phenomenon, with the prefix "neo-" serving to distinguish the modern religions from their ancient, pre-Christian forerunners. Some pagan practitioners also prefer "neopaganism", believing that the prefix conveys the reformed nature of the religion, such as its rejection of practices such as animal sacrifice. Conversely, most pagans do not use the word neopagan, with some expressing disapproval of it, arguing that the term "neo" offensively disconnects them from what they perceive as their pre-Christian forebears. To avoid causing offense, many scholars in the English-speaking world have begun using the prefixes "modern" or "contemporary" rather than "neo". Several pagan studies scholars, such as Ronald Hutton and Sabina Magliocco, have emphasized the use of the upper-case "Paganism" to distinguish the modern movement from the lower-case "paganism", a term commonly used for pre-Christian belief systems. In 2015, Rountree opined that this lower case/upper case division was "now [the] convention" in pagan studies. Among the critics of the upper-case P are York and Andras Corban-Arthen, president of the ECER. Capitalizing the word, they argue, makes "Paganism" appear as the name of a cohesive religion rather than a generic religious category, and comes off as naive, dishonest, or as an unwelcome attempt to disrupt the spontaneity and vernacular quality of the movement.

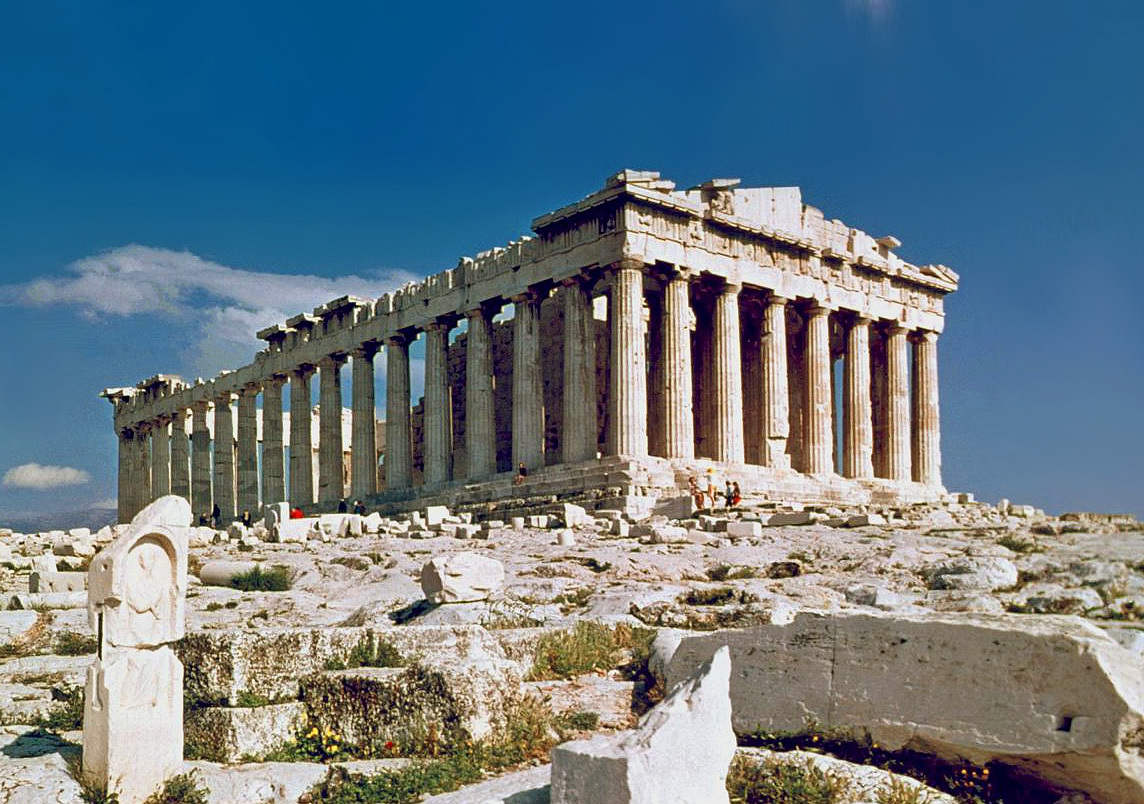
The Parthenon, an ancient pre-Christian temple in Athens dedicated to the goddess Athena. Strmiska believed that modern pagans, in part, reappropriate the term "pagan" to honor the cultural achievements of Europe's pre-Christian societies.

The term "neo-pagan" was coined in the 19th century in reference to Renaissance and Romanticist Hellenophile classical revivalism. (Note: The very persons who would most writhe and wail at their surroundings if transported back into early Greece, would, I think, be the neo-pagans and Hellas worshipers of today." (W. James, letter of 5 April 1868, cited after OED); "The neopagan impulse of the classical revival". (J. A. Symonds, Renaissance in Italy, 1877, iv. 193); "Pre-Raphaelitism [...] has got mixed up with æstheticism, neo-paganism, and other such fantasies." (J. McCarthy, A History of Our Own Times, 1880 iv. 542).) By the mid-1930s "neopagan" was being applied to new religious movements like Jakob Wilhelm Hauer's German Faith Movement and Jan Stachniuk's Polish Zadruga, usually by outsiders and often pejoratively. Pagan as a self-designation appeared in 1964 and 1965, in the publications of the Witchcraft Research Association; at that time, the term was in use by Wiccans in the United States and the United Kingdom, but unconnected to the broader, counterculture pagan movement. The modern popularisation of the terms pagan and neopagan as they are currently understood is largely traced to Oberon Zell-Ravenheart, co-founder of the 1st Neo-Pagan Church of All Worlds, who, beginning in 1967 with the early issues of Green Egg, used both terms for the growing movement. This usage has been common since the pagan revival in the 1970s.

According to Strmiska, the reappropriation of the term "pagan" by modern pagans served as "a deliberate act of defiance" against "traditional, Christian-dominated society", allowing them to use it as a source of "pride and power". In this, he compared it to the gay liberation movement's reappropriation of the term "queer", which had formerly been used only as a term of homophobic abuse. He suggests that part of the term's appeal lay in the fact that a large proportion of pagan converts were raised in Christian families, and that by embracing the term "pagan", a word long used for what was "rejected and reviled by Christian authorities", a convert summarizes "in a single word his or her definitive break" from Christianity. He further suggests that the term gained appeal through its depiction in romanticist and 19th-century European nationalist literature, where it had been imbued with "a certain mystery and allure", and that by embracing the word "pagan" modern pagans defy past religious intolerance to honor the pre-Christian peoples of Europe and emphasize those societies' cultural and artistic achievements.

== Varieties ==
=== Eclectic and reconstructive ===
"We might say that Reconstructionist Pagans romanticize the past, while eclectic pagans idealize the future. In the first case, there is a deeply felt need to connect with the past as a source of spiritual strength and wisdom; in the second case, there is the idealistic hope that a spirituality of nature can be gleaned from ancient sources and shared with all humanity."

— Religious studies scholar Michael Strmiska

Modern pagan attitudes differ regarding the sources of pre-Christian belief systems. Strmiska notes that pagan groups can be "divided along a continuum: at one end are those that aim to reconstruct the ancient religious traditions of a particular ethnic group or a linguistic or geographic area to the highest degree possible; at the other end are those that freely blend traditions of different areas, peoples, and time periods." Strmiska argues that these two poles could be termed reconstructionism and eclecticism, respectively. Reconstructionists do not altogether reject innovation in their interpretation and adaptation of the source material; however, they do believe that the source material conveys greater authenticity and thus should be emphasized. They often follow scholarly debates about the nature of such pre-Christian religions, and some reconstructionists are themselves scholars. Eclectic pagans, conversely, seek general inspiration from the pre-Christian past, and do not attempt to recreate past rites or traditions with specific attention to detail.

On the reconstructionist side can be placed those movements which often favour the designation "Native Faith", including Romuva, Heathenry, Roman Traditionalism and Hellenism. On the eclectic side has been placed Wicca, Thelema, Adonism, Druidry, the Goddess Movement, Discordianism and the Radical Faeries. Strmiska also suggests that this division could be seen as being based on "discourses of identity", with reconstructionists emphasizing a deep-rooted sense of place and people, and eclectics embracing a universality and openness toward humanity and the Earth.

Strmiska nevertheless notes that this reconstructionist-eclectic division is "neither as absolute nor as straightforward as it might appear". He cites the example of Dievturība, a form of reconstructionist paganism that seeks to revive the pre-Christian religion of the Latvian people, by noting that it exhibits eclectic tendencies by adopting a monotheistic focus and ceremonial structure from Lutheranism. Similarly, while examining neo-shamanism among the Sami people of Northern Scandinavia, Siv Ellen Kraft highlights that despite the religion being reconstructionist in intent, it is highly eclectic in the manner in which it has adopted elements from shamanic traditions in other parts of the world. In discussing Asatro – a form of Heathenry based in Denmark – Matthew Amster notes that it did not fit clearly within such a framework, because, while seeking a reconstructionist form of historical accuracy, Asatro strongly eschewed the emphasis on ethnicity common to other reconstructionist groups. While Wicca is identified as an eclectic form of paganism, Strmiska also notes that some Wiccans have moved in a more reconstructionist direction by focusing on a particular ethnic and cultural link, thus developing such variants as Norse Wicca and Celtic Wicca. Concern has also been expressed regarding the utility of the term "reconstructionism" when dealing with the paganisms of Central and Eastern Europe, because in many of the languages of these regions, equivalents of the term "reconstructionism" – such as the Czech Historická rekonstrukce and Lithuanian Istorinė rekonstrukcija – are already used to define the secular hobby of historical re-enactment.

=== Ecologic and secular ===
The spectrum of modern paganism includes a range of ecologic and explicitly ecocentric practices, which may overlap with scientific pantheism. Pagans may distinguish their beliefs and practices as a form of religious naturalism or naturalist philosophy, with some engaged as humanistic pagans or atheopagans.

=== Ethnic and regional ===
For some pagan groups, ethnicity is central to their religion, and some restrict membership to a single ethnic group. Some critics have described this approach as a form of racism. Other pagan groups allow people of any ethnicity, on the view that the gods and goddesses of a particular region can call anyone to their form of worship. Some such groups feel a particular affinity for the pre-Christian belief systems of a particular region with which they have no ethnic link because they see themselves as reincarnations of people from that society. There is greater focus on ethnicity within the pagan movements in continental Europe than within the pagan movements in North America and the British Isles. Such ethnic paganisms have variously been seen as responses to concerns about foreign ideologies, globalization, cosmopolitanism, and anxieties about cultural erosion.

Although they acknowledged that it was "a highly simplified model", Aitamurto and Simpson wrote that there was "some truth" to the claim that leftist-oriented forms of paganism were prevalent in North America and the British Isles while rightist-oriented forms of paganism were prevalent in Central and Eastern Europe. They noted that in these latter regions, pagan groups emphasized "the centrality of the nation, the ethnic group, or the tribe". Rountree wrote that it was wrong to assume that "expressions of Paganism can be categorized straight-forwardly according to region", but acknowledged that some regional trends were visible, such as the impact of Catholicism on paganism in Southern Europe.

== Historicity ==
Modern Pagans are reviving, reconstructing, and reimagining religious traditions of the past that were suppressed for a very long time, even to the point of being almost totally obliterated... Thus, with only a few possible exceptions, today's Pagans cannot claim to be continuing religious traditions handed down in an unbroken line from ancient times to the present. They are modern people with a great reverence for the spirituality of the past, making a new religion – a modern Paganism – from the remnants of the past, which they interpret, adapt, and modify according to modern ways of thinking.

— Religious studies scholar Michael Strmiska

Although inspired by pre-Christian belief systems, modern paganism is not the same phenomenon as those systems and, in many respects, differs from them considerably. Strmiska stresses that modern paganism is a "new", "modern" religious movement, even if some of its content derives from ancient sources. Contemporary paganism as practiced in the United States in the 1990s has been described as "a synthesis of historical inspiration and present-day creativity". (Note: Carpenter 1996. p. 47. Paganism, as I use the term, refers broadly to an emerging spiritual movement comprised of overlapping forms of spirituality referred to by many names (e.g. 'neo-paganism,' 'paganism,' 'neo-pagan witchcraft,' 'witchcraft,' 'the craft,' 'Wiccan spirituality,' 'Wicca,' 'Wicce,' 'Wiccan religion,' 'the old religion,' 'Goddess spirituality,' 'nature spirituality,' 'nature religion,' 'earth-based spirituality,' 'earth religion,' 'ecofeminist spirituality,' and 'Euro-American shamanism')

Eclectic paganism takes an undogmatic religious stance and therefore potentially sees no one as having authority to deem a source apocryphal. Contemporary paganism has therefore been prone to fakelore, especially in recent years, as information and misinformation alike have been spread on the Internet and in print media. A number of Wiccan, pagan, and even some traditionalist or tribalist groups have histories of "Grandmother Stories"—usually involving initiation by a grandmother, grandfather, or other elderly relative who is said to have taught them the secret, millennia-old traditions of their ancestors. Since this secret wisdom can almost always be traced to recent sources, tellers of these stories have often later admitted they made them up. Strmiska asserts that contemporary paganism could be viewed as a part of the "much larger phenomenon" of efforts to revive "traditional, indigenous, or native religions" that were occurring across the globe.

== Beliefs ==
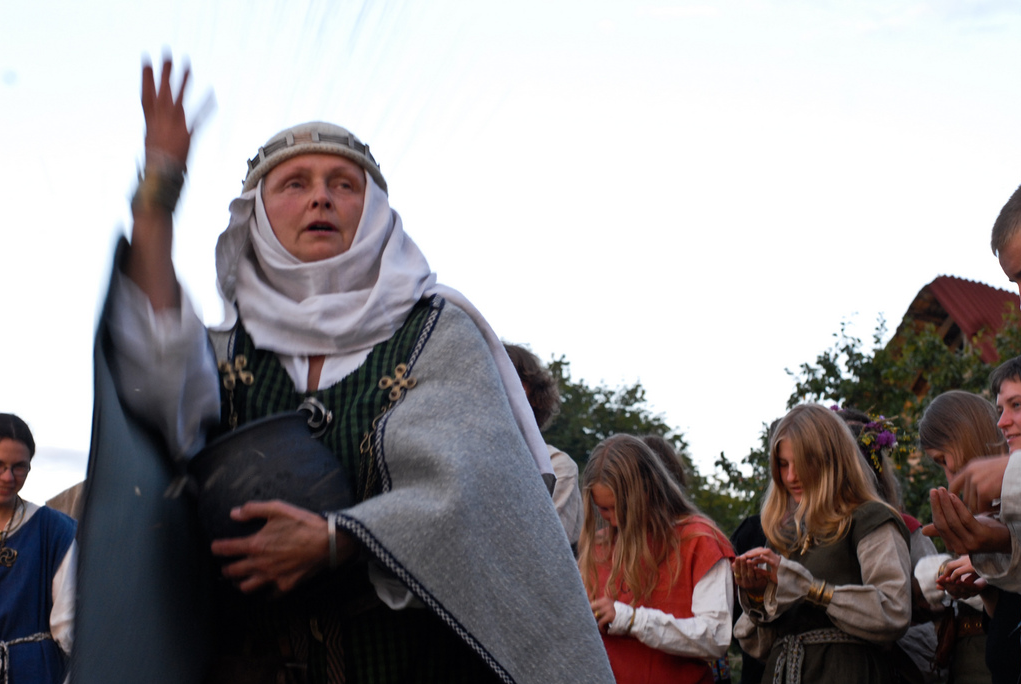
Romuvan priestess Inija Trinkūnienė leading a ritual

Beliefs and practices vary widely among pagan groups; however, there is a set of core principles common to most, if not all, forms of modern paganism. The English academic Graham Harvey noted that pagans "rarely indulge in theology".

=== Polytheism ===
One principle of the pagan movement is polytheism, the belief in and veneration of multiple gods or goddesses. Within the pagan movement, there can be found many deities, both male and female, who have various associations and embody forces of nature, aspects of culture, and facets of human psychology. These deities are typically depicted in human form, and are viewed as having human faults. They are therefore not seen as perfect, but rather are venerated as being wise and powerful. Pagans feel that this understanding of the gods reflected the dynamics of life on Earth, allowing for the expression of humour.

One view in the pagan community is that these polytheistic deities are not viewed as literal entities, but as Jungian archetypes or other psychological constructs. Others adopt the belief that the deities have both a psychological and external existence. Many pagans believe adoption of a polytheistic worldview would be beneficial for Western society—replacing the dominant monotheism they see as innately repressive. In fact, many American modern pagans first came to their adopted faiths because they offered greater freedom, diversity, and tolerance of worship within the community than other faiths. This religious pluralism has helped the varied factions of modern paganism exist in relative harmony. Most pagans adopt an ethos of "unity in diversity" regarding their religious beliefs.

The inclusion of female deities is one facet that distinguishes pagan religions from most of their Abrahamic counterparts. In Wicca, male and female deities are typically balanced in a form of duotheism. Among many pagans, there is a strong desire to incorporate the female aspects of the divine in their worship and within their lives, which can partially explain the attitude that sometimes manifests as the veneration of the sacred feminine.

There are exceptions to polytheism in paganism, as seen, for instance, in the form of Ukrainian paganism promoted by Lev Sylenko, which is devoted to a monotheistic veneration of the god Dazhbog. As noted above, pagans with naturalistic worldviews may not believe in or work with deities at all. Pagan religions commonly exhibit a metaphysical concept of an underlying order that pervades the universe, such as the concept of harmonia embraced by Hellenists and that of Wyrd found in Heathenry.

=== Animism and pantheism ===
A key part of most pagan worldviews is the holistic concept of an interconnected universe. This is connected with a belief in either pantheism or panentheism. In pantheistic systems, the universe and divinity are conceived as one and the same; in panentheistic systems, divinity is both coterminous with the universe and beyond it. For pagans, pantheism means that "divinity is inseparable from nature and that [a] deity is immanent in nature".

Dennis D. Carpenter noted that belief in a pantheistic or panentheistic deity has led to the idea that interconnectedness plays a key role in pagans' worldviews. The prominent Reclaiming priestess Starhawk related that a core part of goddess-centred pagan witchcraft was "the understanding that all being is interrelated, that we are all linked with the cosmos as parts of one living organism. What affects one of us affects us all."

Another common belief in the contemporary pagan movement is that of animism. This has been interpreted in two distinct ways among the pagan community. First, it can refer to a belief that everything in the universe is imbued with a life force or spiritual energy. In contrast, some contemporary pagans believe that specific spirits inhabit various features of the natural world and can be actively communicated with. Some pagans have reported experiencing communication with spirits dwelling in rocks, plants, trees, and animals, as well as power animals or animal spirits that can act as spiritual helpers or guides.

Animism was also a concept common to many pre-Christian European religions, and in adopting it, contemporary pagans are attempting to "reenter the primeval worldview" and participate in a view of cosmology "that is not possible for most Westerners after childhood."

=== Nature veneration ===
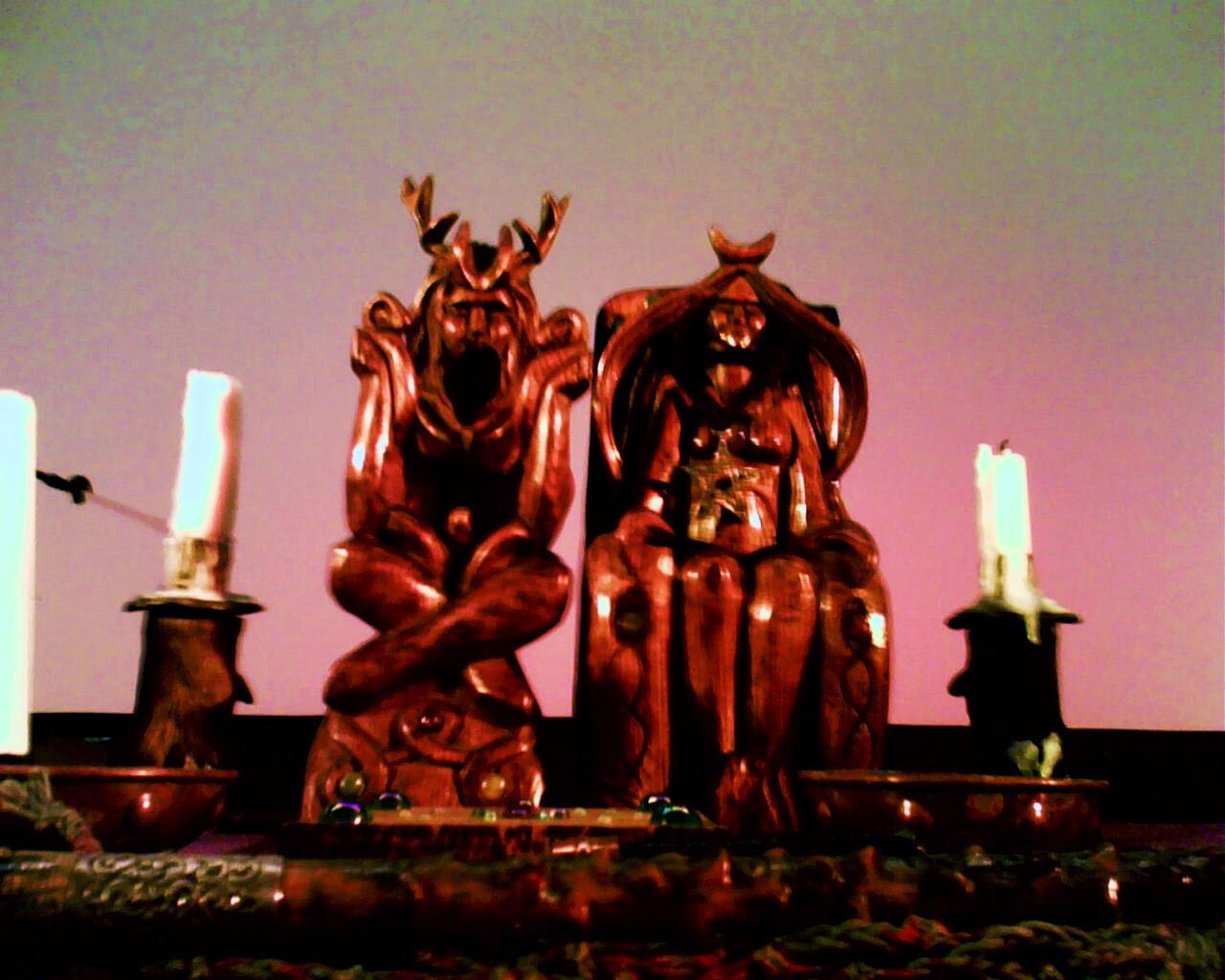
A Wiccan altar belonging to Doreen Valiente, displaying the Wiccan view of sexual duality in divinity

All pagan movements place great emphasis on the divinity of nature as a primary source of divine will, and on humanity's membership of the natural world, bound in kinship to all life and the Earth itself. The animistic aspects of pagan theology assert that all things have a soul—not just humans or organic life—so this bond extends to mountains and rivers as well as trees and wild animals. As a result, pagans believe the essence of their spirituality is both ancient and timeless, regardless of the age of specific religious movements. Places of natural beauty are therefore treated as sacred and ideal for ritual, like the nemetons of the ancient Celts.

Many pagans hold that different lands and/or cultures have their own natural religion, with many legitimate interpretations of divinity, and therefore reject religious exclusivism. While the pagan community has tremendous variety in political views spanning the whole of the political spectrum, environmentalism is often a common feature. Such views have also led many pagans to revere the planet Earth as Mother Earth, who is often referred to as Gaia after the ancient Greek goddess of the Earth.

== Practices ==
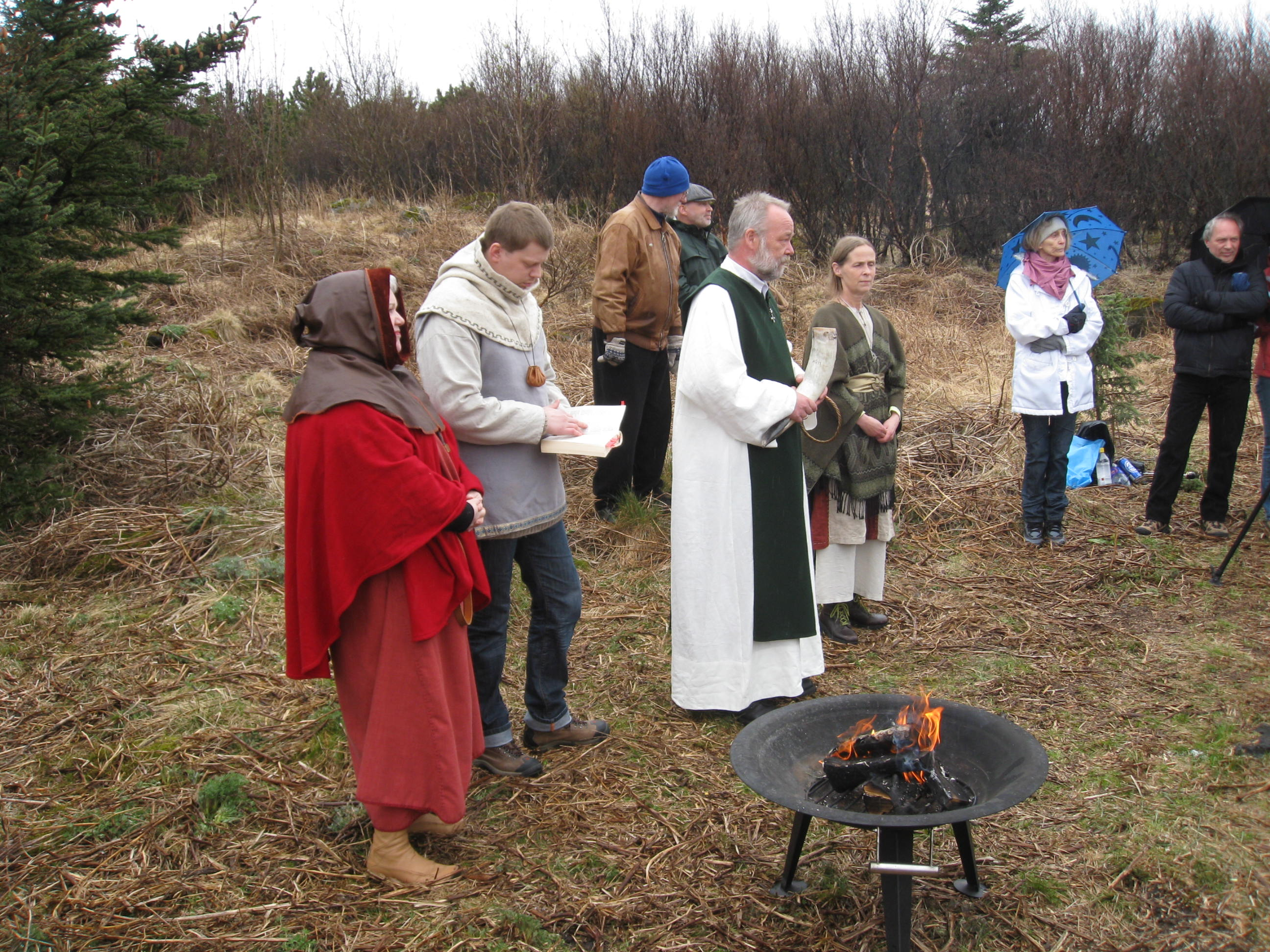
Hilmar Örn Hilmarsson and other members of the Icelandic Ásatrúarfélagið conduct a blót on the First Day of Summer in 2009

=== Ritual ===
Pagan ritual can take place in both a public and private setting. Contemporary pagan ritual is typically geared towards "facilitating altered states of awareness or shifting mind-sets". To induce such altered states of consciousness, pagans use such elements as drumming, visualization, chanting, singing, dancing, and meditation. American folklorist Sabina Magliocco concluded, based upon her ethnographic fieldwork in California, that certain pagan beliefs "arise from what they experience during religious ecstasy".

Sociologist Margot Adler highlighted how several pagan groups, like the Reformed Druids of North America and the Erisian movement incorporate a great deal of play in their rituals rather than having them be completely serious and somber. She noted that some would argue that "the Pagan community is one of the only spiritual communities that is exploring humor, joy, abandonment, even silliness and outrageousness as valid parts of spiritual experience".

Domestic worship typically takes place in the home and is carried out by either an individual or family group. It typically involves offerings – including bread, cake, flowers, fruit, milk, beer, or wine – being given to images of deities, often accompanied with prayers and songs and the lighting of candles and incense. Common pagan devotional practices have thus been compared to similar practices in Hinduism, Buddhism, Shinto, Roman Catholicism, and Orthodox Christianity, but contrasted with those in Protestantism, Judaism, and Islam. Although animal sacrifice was a common part of pre-Christian ritual in Europe, it is rarely practiced in contemporary paganism.

=== Festival ===
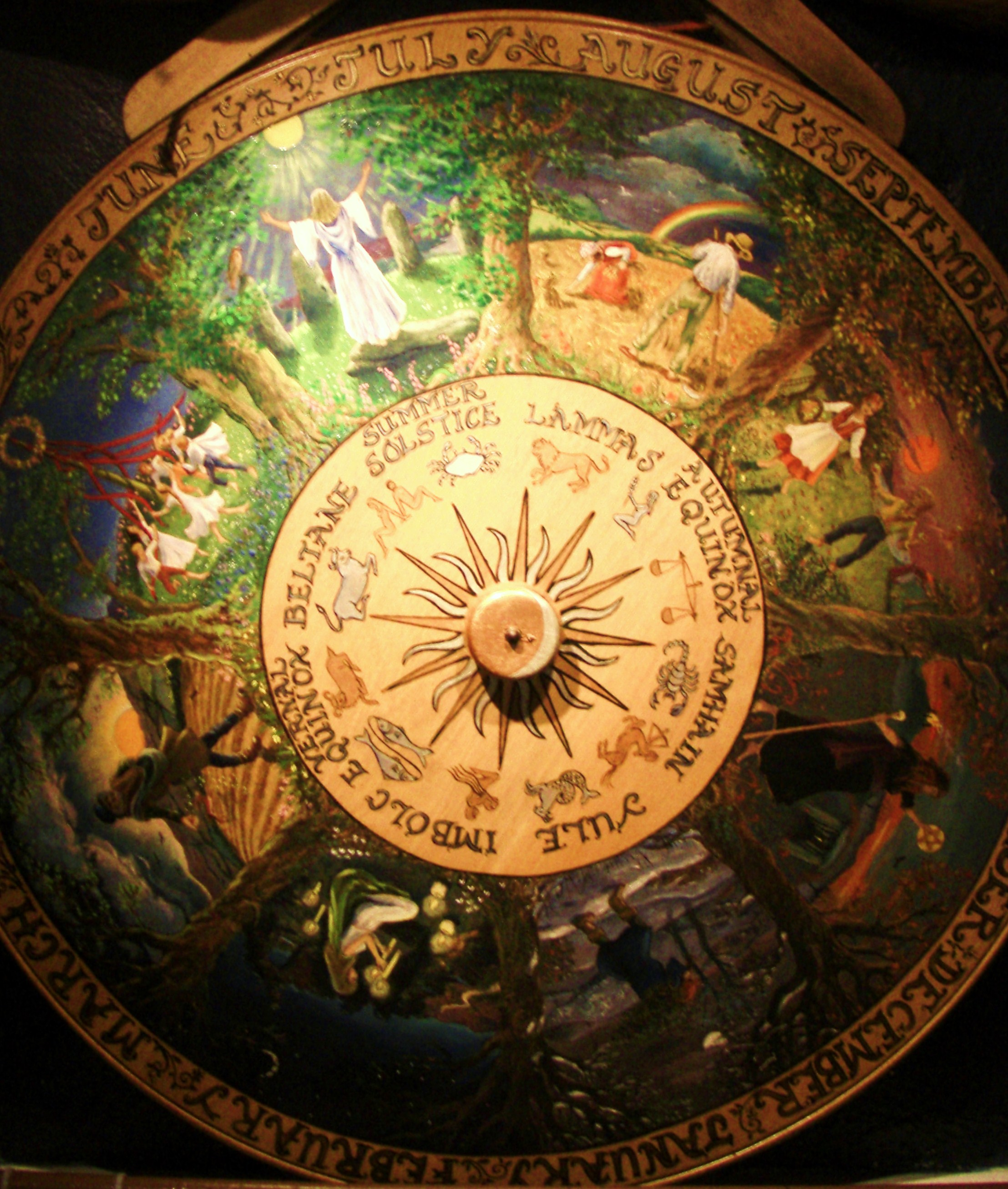
A painted Wheel of the Year at the Museum of Witchcraft, Boscastle, Cornwall, England, displaying all eight of the Sabbats

Paganism's public rituals are generally calendrical, although the pre-Christian festivals that pagans use as a basis varied across Europe. Nevertheless, common to almost all pagan religions is an emphasis on an agricultural cycle and respect for the dead. Common pagan festivals include those marking the summer solstice and winter solstice as well as the start of spring and the harvest. In Wicca and Druidry, a Wheel of the Year has been developed, which typically involves eight seasonal festivals.

=== Magic ===
The belief in magical rituals and spells is held by a "significant number" of contemporary pagans. Among those who believe in it, there are a variety of different views about what magic is. Many modern pagans adhere to the definition of magic provided by Aleister Crowley, the founder of Thelema: "the Science and Art of causing change to occur in conformity with Will". Also accepted by many is the related definition purportedly provided by the ceremonial magician Dion Fortune: "magic is the art and science of changing consciousness according to the Will".

Among those who practice magic are Wiccans, those who identify as neopagan witches, and practitioners of some forms of revivalist neo-Druidism, the rituals of which are at least partially based upon those of ceremonial magic and freemasonry.

== History ==
=== Early modern period ===
Discussions about prevailing, returning or new forms of paganism have existed throughout the modern period. Before the 20th century, Christian institutions regularly used paganism as a term for everything outside of Christianity, Judaism and – from the 18th century – Islam. They frequently associated paganism with idolatry, magic and a general concept of "false religion" which, for example, has made Catholics and Protestants accuse each other of being pagans. Various folk beliefs have periodically been labeled as pagan and churches have demanded that they should be purged. The Western attitude to paganism gradually changed during the early modern period. One reason was increased contacts with areas outside of Europe, which happened through trade, Christian mission and colonization. Increased knowledge of other cultures led to questions of whether their practices even fit into the definitions of religion, and paganism was incorporated in the idea of progress, where it was ranked as a low, undeveloped form of religion. Another reason for change was the circulation of ancient writings such as those attributed to Hermes Trismegistus; this made paganism an intellectual position some Europeans began to self-identify with, starting at the latest in the 15th century with people like Gemistos Plethon, who wanted to establish a new form of Greco-Roman polytheism. Gemistos Plethon influenced Cosimo de Medici to establish the Florentine Neoplatonic Academy and consequentially Julius Pomponius Laetus (student of Pletho) also advocated for a revival and established the Roman academy which secretly celebrated the Natale di Roma and the birthday of Romulus. The Academy was dissolved in 1468 when Pope Paul II ordered the arrest and execution of some of the members, Pope Sixtus IV allowed Laetus to open the academy again until the Sack of Rome in 1527.

Positive identification with paganism became more common in the 18th and 19th centuries, when it tied in with criticism of Christianity and organized religion, rooted in the ideas of the Age of Enlightenment and Romanticism. The approach to paganism varied during this period; Friedrich Schiller's 1788 poem "Die Götter Griechenlandes" presents ancient Greek religion as a powerful alternative to Christianity, whereas others took interest in paganism through the concept of the noble savage, often associated with Jean-Jacques Rousseau. During the French Revolution and French First Republic, some public figures incorporated pagan themes in their worldviews. An explicit example was Gabriel André Aucler, who responded to both Christianity and Enlightenment atheism by performing pagan rites and arguing for renewed pagan religiosity in his book La Thréicie (1799).

=== 19th and early 20th centuries ===
Great God! I'd rather be
A Pagan suckled in a creed outworn;
So might I, standing on this pleasant lea,
Have glimpses that would make me less forlorn;
Have sight of Proteus rising from the sea;
Or hear old Triton blow his wreathèd horn.

— William Wordsworth, "The World Is Too Much with Us", lines 9–14

One of the origins of modern pagan movements lies in the romanticist and national liberation movements that developed in Europe during the 18th and 19th centuries. The publications of studies into European folk customs and culture by scholars like Johann Gottfried Herder and Jacob Grimm resulted in a wider interest in these subjects and a growth in cultural self-consciousness. At the time, it was commonly believed that almost all such folk customs were survivals from the pre-Christian period. These attitudes would also be exported to North America by European immigrants in these centuries.

The Romantic movement of the 18th century led to the rediscovery of Old Gaelic and Old Norse literature and poetry. The 19th century saw a surge of interest in Germanic paganism with the Viking revival in Victorian Britain and Scandinavia, and the Völkisch movement in Germany. These currents coincided with Romanticist interest in folklore and occultism, the widespread emergence of pagan themes in popular literature, and the rise of nationalism.

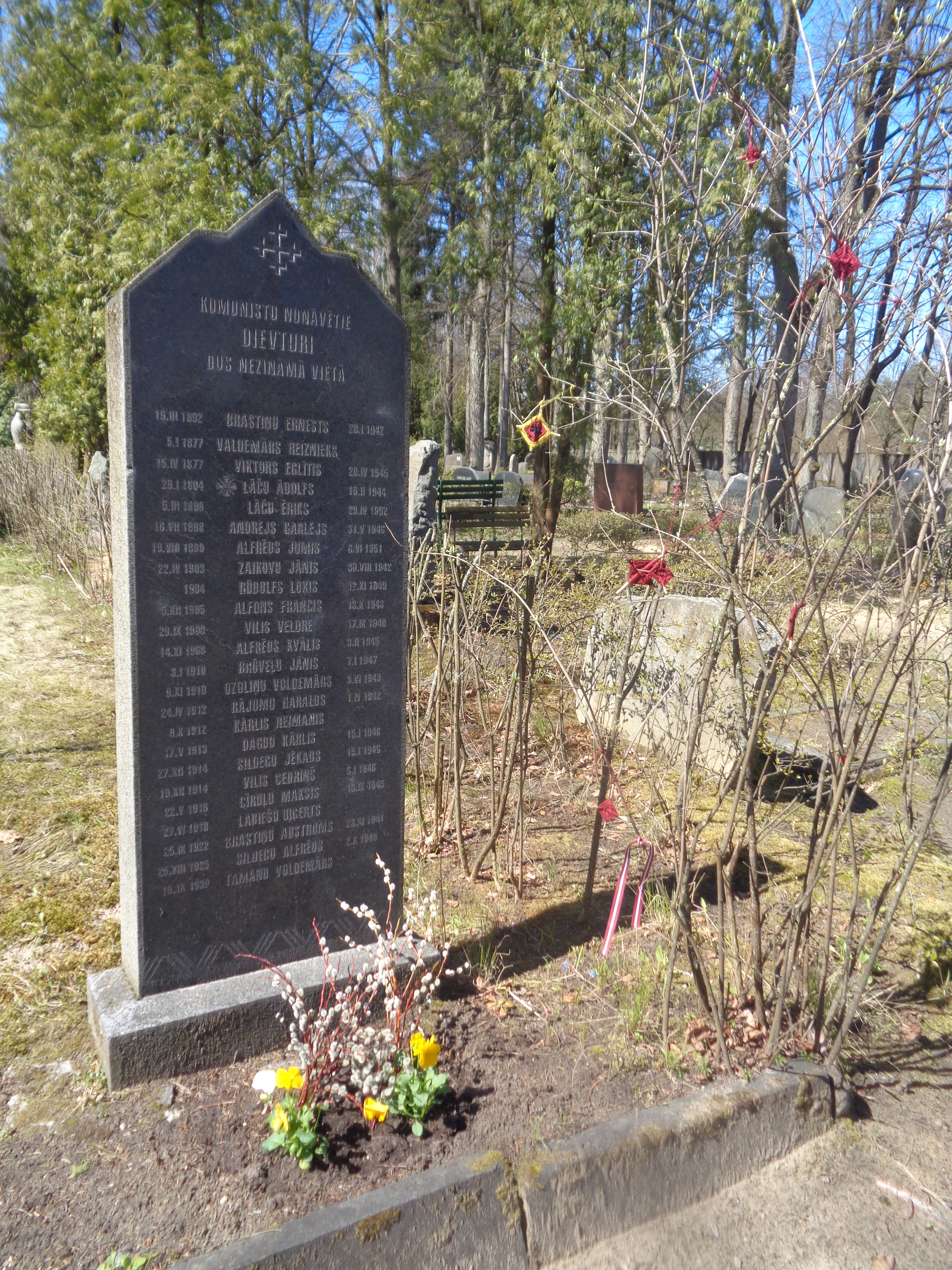
Memorial stone at the Forest Cemetery of Riga to Latvian Dievturi killed by the Communists 1942–1952

The rise of modern Paganism is both a result and a measure of increased religious liberty and rising tolerance for religious diversity in modern societies, a liberty and tolerance made possible by the curbing of the sometimes oppressive power wielded by Christian authorities to compel obedience and participation in centuries past. To say it another way, modern Paganism is one of the happy stepchildren of modern multiculturalism and social pluralism.

— Religious studies scholar Michael Strmiska

The rise of modern paganism was aided by the decline in Christianity throughout many parts of Europe and North America, as well as by the concomitant decline in enforced religious conformity and greater freedom of religion that developed, allowing people to explore a wider range of spiritual options and form religious organisations that could operate free from legal persecution.

Historian Ronald Hutton has argued that many of the motifs of 20th century neo-paganism may be traced back to the utopian, mystical counter-cultures of the late-Victorian and Edwardian periods (also extending in some instances into the 1920s), via the works of amateur folklorists, popular authors, poets, political radicals and alternative lifestylers.

Prior to the spread of the 20th-century modern pagan movements, a notable instance of self-identified paganism was in Sioux writer Zitkala-sa's essay "Why I Am A Pagan". Published in the Atlantic Monthly in 1902, the Native American activist and writer outlined her rejection of Christianity (referred to as "the new superstition") in favor of a harmony with nature embodied by the Great Spirit. She further recounted her mother's abandonment of Sioux religion and the unsuccessful attempts of a "native preacher" to get her to attend the village church.

In the 1920s, Margaret Murray theorized that a secret pagan religion had survived the witchcraft persecutions enacted by the ecclesiastical and secular courts. Historians now reject Murray's theory, as she based it partially upon the similarities of the accounts given by those accused of witchcraft; such similarity is now thought to actually derive from there having been a standard set of questions laid out in the witch-hunting manuals used by interrogators.

In the transition between the 1800s and 1900s, efforts to incorporate pagan-Roman rituals into the Italian national identity were made by archaeologist Giacomo Boni and esoteric circles in Rome.

In 1927, philosopher and esotericist Julius Evola founded the Gruppo di Ur in Rome, along with its journal Ur (1927–1928), involving figures like Arturo Reghini. In 1928, Evola published Imperialismo Pagano, advocating Italian political paganism to oppose the Lateran Pacts. The journal resumed in 1929 as Krur.

A mysterious document published in Krur in 1929, attributed to orientalist Leone Caetani, suggested that Italy's World War I victory and the rise of fascism were influenced by Etruscan-Roman rites.

=== Late 20th century ===
The 1960s and 1970s saw a resurgence in neo-Druidism as well as the rise of modern Germanic paganism in the United States and in Iceland. In the 1970s, Wicca was notably influenced by feminism, leading to the creation of an eclectic, Goddess-worshipping movement known as Dianic Wicca. The 1979 publication of Margot Adler's Drawing Down the Moon and Starhawk's The Spiral Dance opened a new chapter in public awareness of paganism. With the growth and spread of large, pagan gatherings and festivals in the 1980s, public varieties of Wicca continued to further diversify into additional, eclectic sub-denominations, often heavily influenced by the New Age and counter-culture movements. These open, unstructured or loosely structured traditions contrast with British Traditional Wicca, which emphasizes secrecy and initiatory lineage.

In 1998, the ECER (European Congress of Ethnic Religions) was founded with the aim of safeguarding pre-Christian or reconstructionist religions. Some of the organizations affiliated with this entity have contributed to the revival of paganism by building temples and organizing rituals and events in collaboration with various organizations.

After the fall of fascism, the public focus on pre-Christian Roman spirituality was mainly promoted by Julius Evola. In the 1970s, interest in pagan Romanity and the Gruppo di Ur resurfaced among youth linked to Evola. He also introduced non-Roman religious concepts like Buddhism, Hinduism, and sexual magic.

The Gruppo dei Dioscuri was formed in Rome, Naples, and Messina, publishing four pamphlets before disappearing from public view, though it continued activities from 1969 and remained active in various Italian regions after its founder's death in 2000.

The Evolian journal Arthos, founded in Genoa in 1972 by Renato del Ponte, expressed significant interest in Roman religion. In 1984, the Gruppo Arx revived Messina's Dioscuri activities, and the Pythagorean Association briefly resurfaced in Calabria and Sicily from 1984 to 1988, publishing Yghìeia.

Other publications include the Genoese Il Basilisco (1979–1989), which released several works on pagan studies, and Politica Romana (1994–2004), seen as a high-level Romano-pagan journal. One prominent figure was actor Roberto Corbiletto, who died in a mysterious fire in 1999.

The 1980s and 1990s also saw an increasing interest in serious academic research and reconstructionist pagan traditions. The establishment and growth of the Internet in the 1990s brought rapid growth to these, and other pagan movements. By the time of the collapse of the former Soviet Union in 1991, freedom of religion was legally established across Russia and a number of other newly independent states, allowing for the growth in both Christian and non-Christian religions.

== Religious paths and movements ==
=== Reconstructionist ===
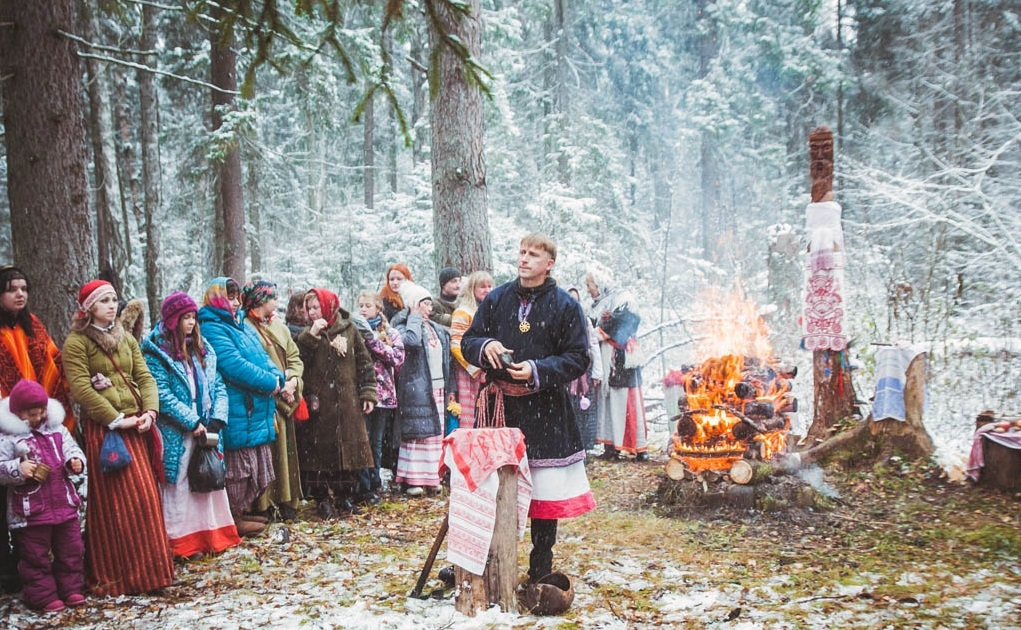
The community of the Union of Slavic Native Belief Communities celebrating Mokosh

In contrast to the eclectic traditions, Polytheistic Reconstructionists practice culturally specific ethnic traditions based on folklore, songs and prayers, as well as reconstructions from the historical record. Hellenic, Roman, Kemetic, Celtic, Germanic, Guanche, Baltic and Slavic reconstructionists aim to preserve and revive the practices and beliefs of Ancient Greece, Ancient Rome, Ancient Egypt, the Celts, the Germanic peoples, the Guanche people, the Balts and the Slavs, respectively.

==== Germanic ====
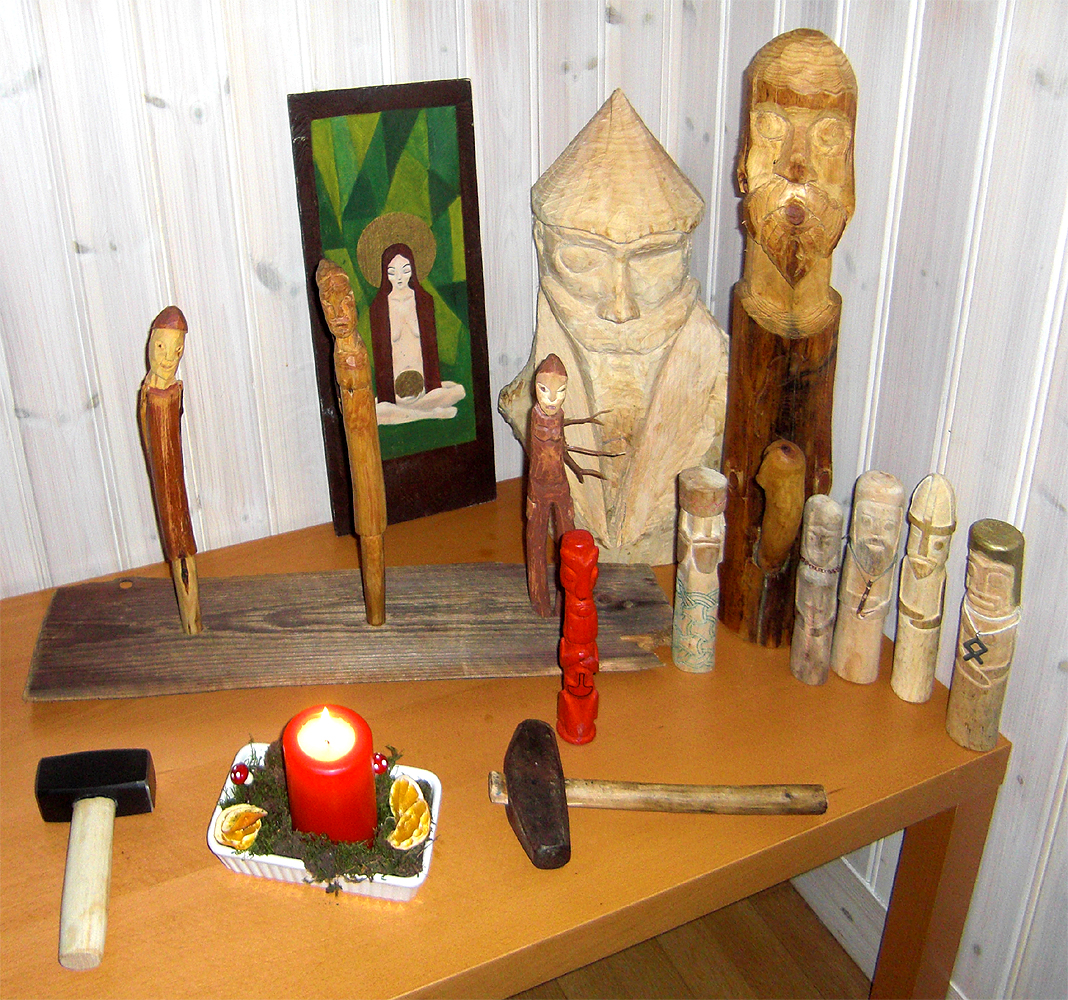
A Heathen altar for household worship in Gothenburg, Sweden

Heathenism, also known as Germanic neopaganism, refers to a series of contemporary pagan traditions based on the historical religions, culture and literature of Germanic-speaking Europe. Heathenry is spread out across northwestern Europe, North America and Australasia, where the descendants of historic Germanic-speaking people now live.

Many Heathen groups adopt variants of Norse mythology as a basis for their beliefs, conceiving of the Earth as on the great world tree Yggdrasil. Heathens believe in multiple polytheistic deities adopted from historical Germanic mythologies. Most are polytheistic realists, believing that the deities are real entities, while others view them as Jungian archetypes.

==== Slavic ====
Slavic neo-paganism, or Slavic nativism, is a reconstruction of the pre-Christian pagan beliefs of the ancient Slavs, a return to the worship of Perun, Veles, Makosh, etc. based on some historical information and one's own ideas, with borrowings from the teachings and rituals of polytheistic beliefs of other peoples and the occult.

==== Somali ====
Unlike other neo-pagan movements, Somali neo-paganism is primarily built around the Unitarian pre-Islamic Religion called Waaqism. Neo-Waaqists reject Islam and Abrahamic religion all together, and believe Waaq created the universe. The movement is relatively new, and a niche view in a community that is majority Muslim.

==== Brazilian Paganism (Piaganism) ====
Brazilian Paganism, also known as Piaganism (from Religião Piaga), is a contemporary polytheistic religious movement developed in Brazil. It seeks to establish a culturally rooted form of pagan spirituality grounded in Brazilian historical, folkloric, and symbolic traditions, while integrating elements from Indigenous, European, and Afro-Brazilian influences.

Unlike many eclectic neopagan traditions, Piaganism emphasizes the construction of a coherent and culturally specific religious identity, centered on what its adherents describe as a national spiritual framework. This includes the veneration of deities, spirits, and mythological figures interpreted through a Brazilian cultural lens, as well as the development of original theological, liturgical, and symbolic systems.

Piaganism incorporates both reconstructed and newly developed practices, including rituals aligned with agricultural cycles, community festivals, devotional prayers, and the use of symbolic attire and sacred spaces. Practitioners often stress the importance of ancestry, land connection, and cultural continuity, seeking to establish a living religious tradition rather than a purely revivalist model.

The movement is also associated with organized communities and cultural initiatives, such as the Círculo Piaga and the Vila Pagã in Piauí, which function as centers for religious practice, cultural production, and educational activities. These initiatives aim to promote the preservation of cultural heritage, the study of mythology, and the development of a structured pagan religious life in Brazil.

==== Semitic ====
Beit Asherah (the house of the Goddess Asherah) was one of the first modern pagan synagogues, founded in the early 1990s by Stephanie Fox, Steven Posch, and Magenta Griffiths (Lady Magenta). Magenta Griffiths is High Priestess of the Beit Asherah coven, and a former board member of the Covenant of the Goddess.

==== Chuvash ====
The Chuvash people, a Turkic ethnic group native to an area stretching from the Volga Region to Siberia, have experienced a pagan revival since the fall of the Soviet Union. While potentially considered a peculiar form of Tengrism, a related revivalist movement of Central Asian traditional religion, Vattisen Yaly (Chuvash: Ваттисен йӑли, Tradition of the Old) differs significantly: the Chuvash being a heavily Fennicised and Slavified ethnicity and having had exchanges also with other Indo-European ethnicities, their religion shows many similarities with Finnic and Slavic paganisms; moreover, the revival of Vattisen Yaly in recent decades has occurred following modern pagan patterns. Today the followers of the Chuvash Traditional Religion are called "the true Chuvash". Their main god is Tura, a deity comparable to the Estonian Taara, the Germanic Thunraz and the pan-Turkic Tengri.

=== Eclectic ===
==== Wicca ====
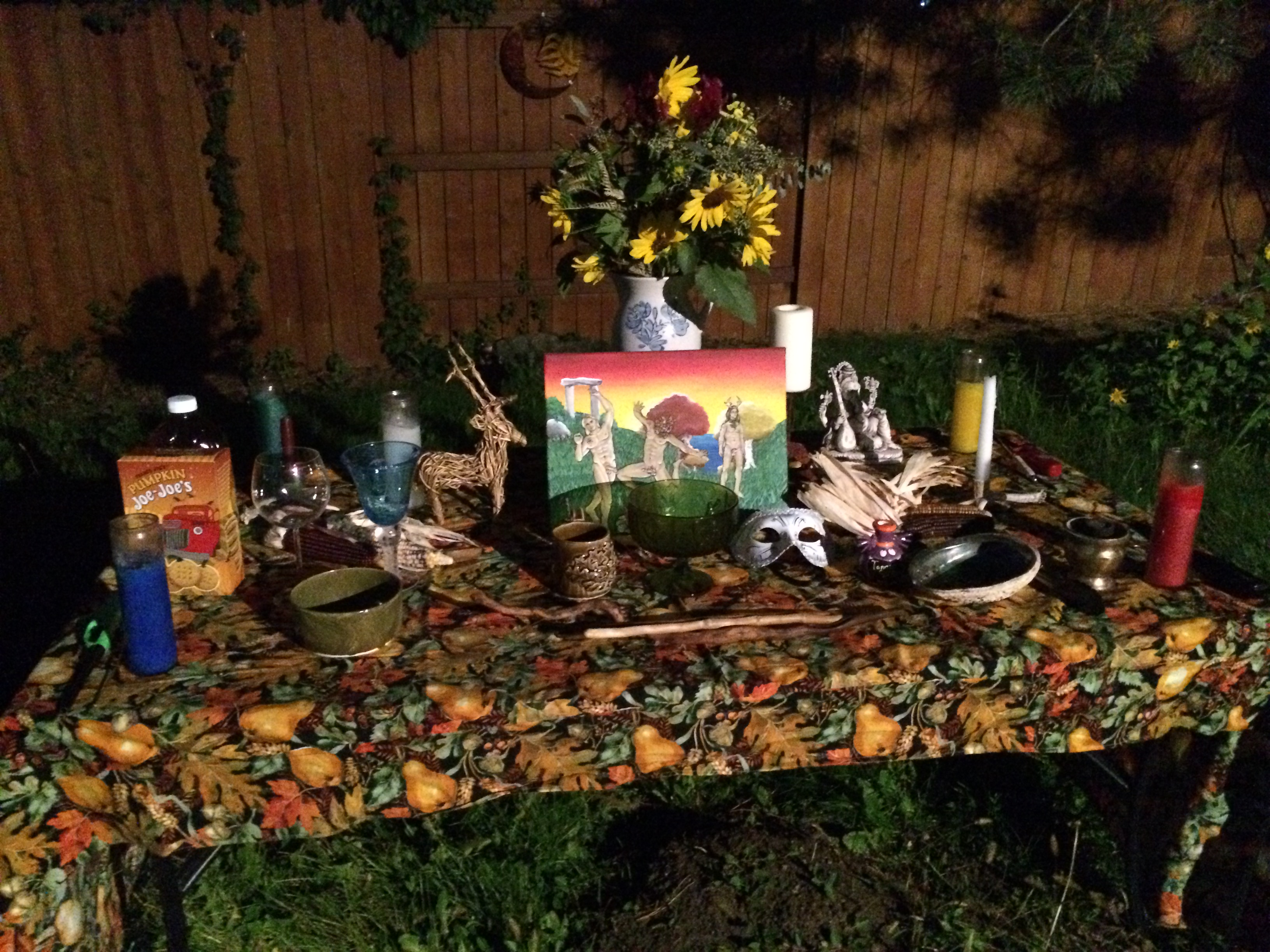
Mabon–fall equinox 2015 altar by the Salt Lake Pagan Society of Salt Lake City, Utah. Displayed are seasonal decorations, altar tools, elemental candles, flowers, deity statues, cookies and juice offerings, and a nude Gods painting of Thor, the Green Man, and Cernunnos dancing around a Mabon Fire.

Wicca is the largest form of modern paganism, as well as the best-known and most extensively studied.

Religious studies scholar Graham Harvey noted that the poem "Charge of the Goddess" remains central to the liturgy of most Wiccan groups. Originally written by Wiccan High Priestess Doreen Valiente in the mid-1950s, the poem allows Wiccans to gain wisdom and experience deity in "the ordinary things in life."

Historian Ronald Hutton identified a wide variety of different sources that influenced Wicca's development, including ceremonial magic, folk magic, Romanticist literature, Freemasonry, and the witch-cult theory of English archaeologist Margaret Murray. English esotericist Gerald Gardner was at the forefront of the burgeoning Wiccan movement. He claimed to have been initiated by the New Forest coven in 1939, and that the religion he discovered was a survival of the pagan witch-cult described in Murray's theory. Various forms of Wicca have since evolved or been adapted from Gardner's British Traditional Wicca or Gardnerian Wicca, such as Alexandrian Wicca. Other forms loosely based on Gardner's teachings are Faery Wicca, Kemetic Wicca, Judeo-paganism or jewitchery, and Dianic Wicca or feminist Wicca, which emphasizes the divine feminine, often creating women-only or lesbian-only groups. In the academic community Wicca has also been interpreted as having close affinities with process philosophy.

In the 1990s, Wiccan beliefs and practices were used as a partial basis for a number of US films and television series, such as The Craft, Charmed and Buffy the Vampire Slayer, leading to a surge in teenagers' and young adults' interest and involvement in the religion.

==== Goddess movement ====
Goddess spirituality, which is also known as the Goddess movement, is a pagan religion in which a singular, monotheistic Goddess is given predominance. Goddess Spirituality revolves around the sacredness of the female form, and of aspects of women's lives that adherents say have been traditionally neglected in Western society, such as menstruation, sexuality, and maternity.

The Goddess movement draws some of its inspiration from the work of archaeologists such as Marija Gimbutas, whose interpretation of artifacts excavated from "Old Europe" points to societies of Neolithic Europe that were matristic or goddess-centered worshipping a female deity of three primary aspects, which has inspired some modern pagan worshippers of the Triple Goddess.

Adherents of the Goddess Spirituality movement typically envision a history of the world that is different from traditional narratives about the past, emphasising the role of women rather than that of men. According to this view, human society was formerly a matriarchy, with communities being egalitarian, pacifistic, and focused on the worship of the Mother goddess, which was subsequently overthrown by violent and warlike patriarchal hordes – usually Indo-European pastoralists who worshipped male sky-gods, and continued to rule through the form of Abrahamic religions, specifically Christianity in the West. Adherents look for elements of this human history in "theological, anthropological, archaeological, historical, folkloric and hagiographic writings."

==== Druidry ====
Druidry shows similar heterogeneity as Wicca. It draws inspirations from historical Druids, the priest caste of the ancient pagan Celts. Druidry dates to the earliest forms of modern paganism: the Ancient Order of Druids founded in 1781 had many aspects of freemasonry, and has practiced rituals at Stonehenge since 1905. George Watson MacGregor Reid founded the Druid Order in its current form in 1909. In 1964 Ross Nichols established the Order of Bards, Ovates and Druids. In the United States, the Ancient Order of Druids in America (AODA) was established in 1912, the Reformed Druids of North America (RDNA) in 1963, and Ár nDraíocht Féin (ADF) in 1983 by Isaac Bonewits.

==== Eco-paganism and Unitarian Universalism ====
Eco-paganism and Eco-magic, which are offshoots of direct action environmental groups, strongly emphasize fairy imagery and a belief in the possibility of intercession by the fae (fairies, pixies, gnomes, elves, and other spirits of nature and the Otherworlds).

Some Unitarian Universalists are eclectic pagans. Unitarian Universalists look for spiritual inspiration in a wide variety of religious beliefs. The Covenant of Unitarian Universalist Pagans, or CUUPs, encourages its chapters to "use practices familiar to members who attend for worship services but not to follow only one tradition of paganism."

==== Occultism and ethnic mysticism ====
In 1925, the Czech esotericist Franz Sättler founded the pagan religion Adonism, devoted to the ancient Greek god Adonis, whom Sättler equated with the Christian Satan, and which purported that the end of the world would come in 2000. Adonism largely died out in the 1930s, but remained an influence on the German occult scene.

== Demographics ==
Establishing precise figures on paganism is difficult. Due to the secrecy and fear of persecution still prevalent among pagans, limited numbers are willing to openly be counted. The decentralised nature of paganism and sheer number of solitary practitioners further complicates matters. Nevertheless, there is a slow growing body of data on the subject. In the US, there are estimated to be between 1 and 1.5 million practitioners.

=== Europe ===
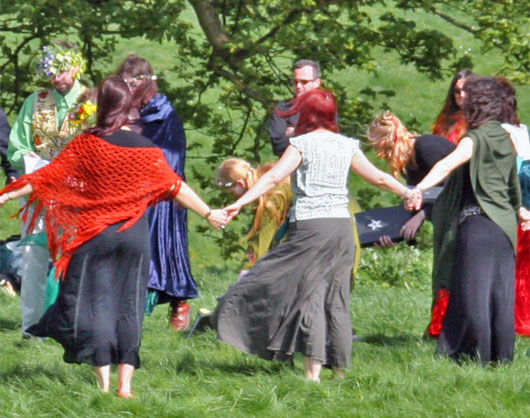
Wiccans gather for a handfasting ceremony at Avebury in England.

==== Caucasus region ====
Among Circassians, the Adyghe Habze faith has been revived after the fall of the Soviet Union, and followers of modern pagan faiths were found to constitute 12% in Karachay-Cherkessia and 3% in Kabardino-Balkaria (both republics are multiethnic and also have many non-Circassians, especially Russians and Turkic peoples) In Abkhazia, the Abkhaz native faith has also been revived, and in the 2003 census, 8% of residents identified with it (note again that there are many non-Abkhaz in the state including Georgians, Russians and Armenians); on 3 August 2012 the Council of Priests of Abkhazia was formally constituted in Sukhumi. In North Ossetia, the Uatsdin faith was revived, and in 2012, 29% of the population identified with it (North Ossetia is about 2/3 Ossetian and 1/3 Russian). (Note: Arena – Atlas of Religions and Nationalities in Russia Archived 12 June 2018 at the Wayback Machine. Sreda.org; 29% "adhere to a traditional religion of their ancestors, worship gods and the forces of nature". (исповедую традиционную религию своих предковпоклоняюсь богам и силам природы). This figure compares to 1.2% adherents of ethnic religions in all of the Russian Federation.) Modern pagan movements are also present to a lesser degree elsewhere; in Dagestan 2% of the population identified with folk religious movements, while data on modern pagans is unavailable for Chechnya and Ingushetia.

==== Volga region ====
The Mari native religion in fact has a continuous existence, but it has co-existed with Orthodox Christianity for centuries and experienced a renewal after the fall of the Soviet Union. A sociological survey conducted in 2004 found that about 15 percent of the population of Mari El consider themselves adherents of the Mari native religion. Since Mari make up just 45 percent of the republic's population of 700,000, this figure means that probably more than a third claim to follow the old religion. The percentage of pagans among the Mari of Bashkortostan and the eastern part of Tatarstan is even higher (up to 69% among women). Mari fled here from forced Christianization in the 17th to 19th centuries. A similar number was claimed by Victor Schnirelmann, for whom between a quarter and a half of the Mari either worship the pagan gods or are members of modern pagan groups.

A modern pagan movement drawing from various syncretic practices that had survived among the Christianised Mari people was initiated in 1990 that was estimated in 2004 to have won the adherence of 2% of the Mordvin people.

==== Western Europe ====
A study by Ronald Hutton compared a number of different sources (including membership lists of major UK organizations, attendance at major events, subscriptions to magazines, etc.) and used standard models for extrapolating likely numbers. This estimate accounted for multiple membership overlaps, as well as the number of adherents represented by each attendee of a pagan gathering. Hutton estimated that there are 250,000 modern pagans in the United Kingdom, roughly equivalent to the national Hindu community.

A smaller number is suggested by the results of the 2001 census, in which a question about religious affiliation was asked for the first time. Respondents were able to write in an affiliation not covered by the checklist of common religions, and a total of 42,262 people from England, Scotland and Wales declared themselves to be pagans by this method. These figures were not released as a matter of course by the Office for National Statistics but were released after an application by the Pagan Federation of Scotland. This is more than many well known traditions such as Rastafarian, Baháʼí and Zoroastrian groups but fewer than the big six of Christianity, Islam, Hinduism, Sikhism, Judaism and Buddhism. It is also fewer than the adherents of Jediism, whose campaign made their faith the fourth largest religion after Christianity, Islam and Hinduism.

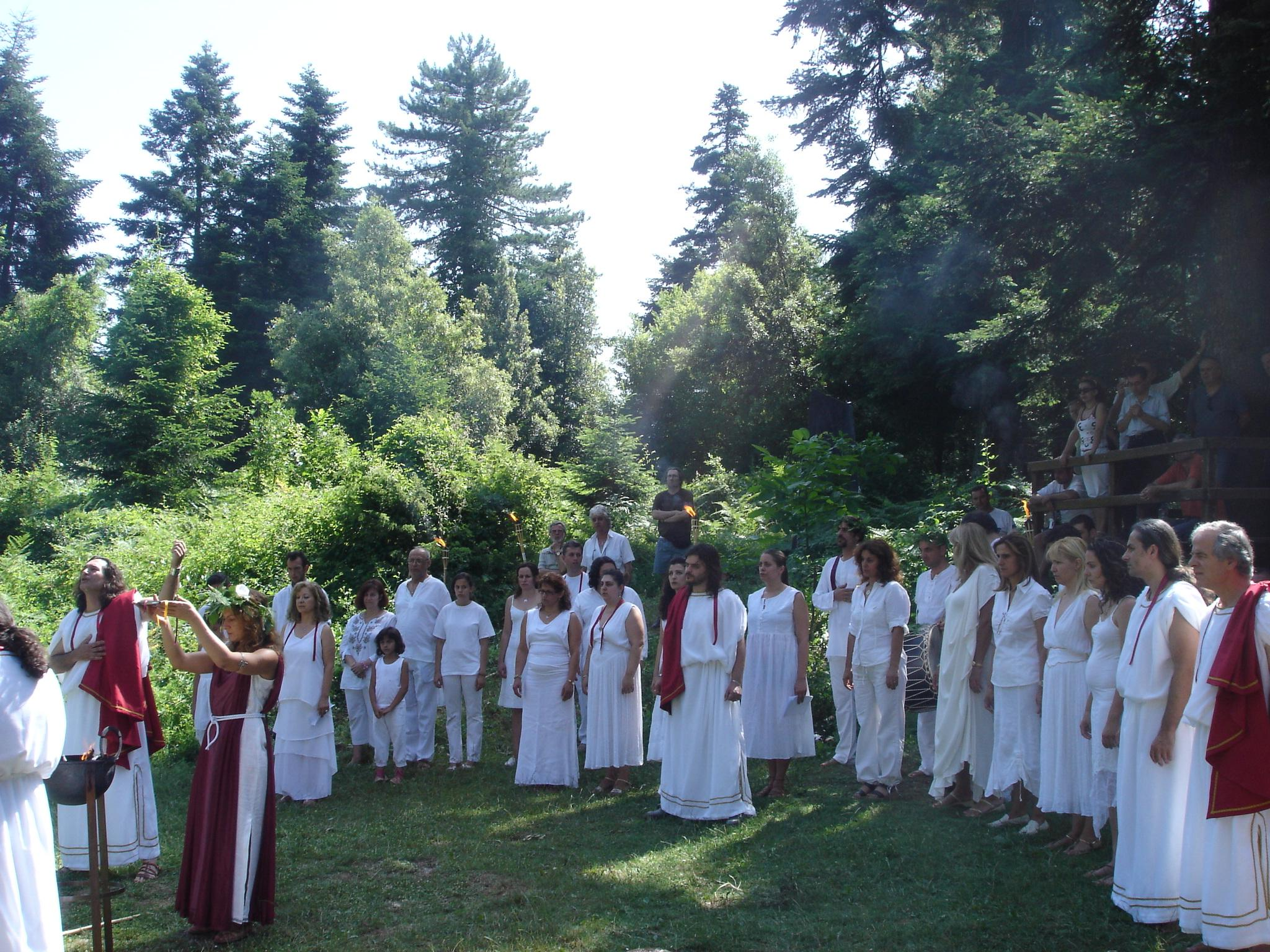
Modern Hellen ritual in Greece

The 2001 UK Census figures did not allow an accurate breakdown of traditions within the pagan heading, as a campaign by the Pagan Federation before the census encouraged Wiccans, Heathens, Druids and others all to use the same write-in term 'pagan' to maximise the numbers reported. However, the 2011 census made it possible to describe oneself as pagan-Wiccan, pagan-Druid and so on. The figures for England and Wales showed 80,153 describing themselves as pagan (or some subgroup thereof). The largest subgroup was Wicca, with 11,766 adherents. The overall numbers of people self-reporting as pagan rose between 2001 and 2011. In 2001, about seven people per 10,000 UK respondents were pagan; in 2011, the number (based on the England and Wales population) was 14.3 people per 10,000 respondents.

Census figures in Ireland do not provide a breakdown of religions outside of the major Christian denominations and other major world religions. A total of 22,497 people stated Other Religion in the 2006 census; and a rough estimate is that there were 2,000–3,000 practicing pagans in Ireland in 2009. Numerous pagan groups – primarily Wiccan and Druidic – exist in Ireland though none is officially recognised by the Government. Irish paganism is often strongly concerned with issues of place and language.

=== North America ===
Socio-economic breakdown of U.S. pagans in 1999

Education	Percentage
Claimed to have at least a College degree	65.4%
Claimed to have Post-graduate degrees	16.1%
Claimed to have completed some college or less	7.6%

Location	Percentage
Urban areas	27.9%
Suburban areas	22.8%
Large towns	14.4%
Small towns	14.4%
Rural areas	15.8%
Didn't respond	5.6%

Ethnicity	Percentage
White	90.4%
Native American	9%
Asian	2%
Hispanic	0.8%
African American	0.5%
"Other"	2.2%
Didn't respond	5%

Canada does not provide extremely detailed records of religious adherence. Its statistics service only collects limited religious information each decade. At the 2001 census, there were a recorded 21,080 pagans in Canada.

The United States government does not directly collect religious information. As a result such information is provided by religious institutions and other third-party statistical organisations. Based on the most recent survey by the Pew Research Center, there are approximately one million pagans in the United States; 0.3% of respondents answered "Pagan" or "Wiccan" when polled.

According to Helen A. Berger's 1995 survey "The Pagan Census", most American pagans are middle-class, educated, and live in urban/suburban areas on the East and West coasts.

=== Oceania ===
Breakdown of Australians
Classifications	Adherents
Animism	780
Druidism	1,049
Paganism	16,851
Pantheism	1,391
Nature Religions	3,599
Wicca/Witchcraft	8,413
Total	32,083

In the 2011 Australian census, 32,083 respondents identified as pagan. Out of 21,507,717 recorded Australians, they compose approximately 0.15% of the population. The Australian Bureau of Statistics classifies paganism as an affiliation under which several sub-classifications may optionally be specified. This includes animism, nature religion, Druidism, pantheism, and Wicca/Witchcraft. As a result, fairly detailed breakdowns of pagan respondents are available.

New Zealander affiliations
Groups	Adherents
Druidism	192
Nature religion	4,530
Wicca	2,082
Total	6,804

In 2006, there were at least 6,804 (0.164%) pagans among New Zealand's population of approximately four million. Respondents were given the option to select one or more religious affiliations.

== Paganism in society ==
=== Propagation ===
Based upon her study of the pagan community in the United States, the sociologist Margot Adler noted that it is rare for pagan groups to proselytize to gain new converts to their faiths. Instead, she argued that "in most cases," converts first become interested in the movement through "word of mouth, a discussion between friends, a lecture, a book, an article or a Web site." She went on to put forward the idea that this typically confirmed "some original, private experience, so that the most common experience of those who have named themselves pagan is something like 'I finally found a group that has the same religious perceptions I always had.'" A practicing Wiccan herself, Adler used her own conversion to paganism as a case study, remarking that as a child she had taken a great interest in the gods and goddesses of ancient Greece, and had performed her own devised rituals in dedication to them. When she eventually came across the Wiccan religion many years later, she then found that it confirmed her earlier childhood experiences, and that "I never converted in the accepted sense. I simply accepted, reaffirmed, and extended a very old experience".

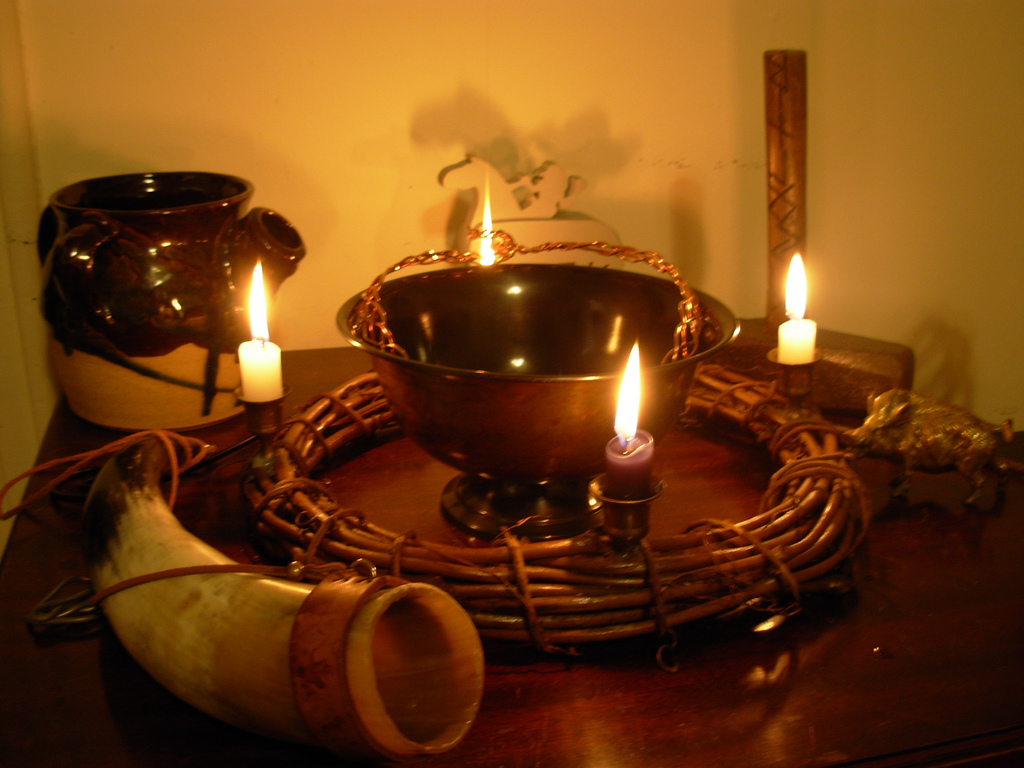
A simple pagan altar

Folklorist Sabina Magliocco supported this idea, noting that a great many of those Californian pagans whom she interviewed claimed that they had been greatly interested in mythology and folklore as children, imagining a world of "enchanted nature and magical transformations, filled with lords and ladies, witches and wizards, and humble but often wise peasants". Magliocco noted that it was this world that pagans "strive to re-create in some measure". Further support for Adler's ideas came from American Wiccan priestess Judy Harrow, who noted that among her comrades, there was a feeling that "you don't become pagan, you discover that you always were". They have also been supported by Pagan studies scholar Graham Harvey.

Many pagans in North America encounter the movement through their involvement in other hobbies; particularly popular with US pagans are "golden age-type" pastimes such as the Society for Creative Anachronism (SCA), Star Trek fandom, Doctor Who fandom and comic book fandom. Other ways in which many North American pagans have gotten involved with the movement are through political or ecological activism, such as vegetarian groups, health food stores, or feminist university courses.

Adler went on to note that from those she interviewed and surveyed in the US she could identify a number of common factors that led to people getting involved in paganism: the beauty, vision and imagination that was found within their beliefs and rituals, a sense of intellectual satisfaction and personal growth that they imparted, their support for environmentalism or feminism, and a sense of freedom.

=== Class, gender and ethnicity ===
==== United States ====
Based upon her work in the United States, Adler found that the pagan movement was "very diverse" in its class and ethnic backgrounds. She went on to remark that she had encountered pagans in jobs that ranged from "fireman to PhD chemist" but that the one thing she thought made them into an "elite" was being avid readers, something that she found to be very common within the pagan community despite the fact that avid readers constituted less than 20% of the general population of the United States at the time. Magliocco came to a somewhat different conclusion based upon her ethnographic research of pagans in California, remarking that the majority were "white, middle-class, well-educated urbanites" but that they were united in finding "artistic inspiration" within "folk and indigenous [American] spiritual traditions,"

The sociologist Regina Oboler examined the role of gender in the American pagan community, arguing that although the movement had been constant in its support for the equality of men and women ever since its foundation, there was still an essentialist view of gender ingrained within it, with female deities being accorded traditional western feminine traits and male deities being similarly accorded what western society saw as masculine traits.

=== Racism and nationalism ===
Generally, modern pagan currents in Western countries do not advocate nationalist or far-right ideologies. Instead, they advocate individual self-improvement and liberal values of personal freedom, gender equality, and environmental protection. The nationalist sentiments expressed by modern pagans in Western countries are marginal, so the ideas of cosmopolitanism are prevalent. Faith and dogmas give way to active practices, including psychotechnics, which was extensively influenced by neo-Hinduism. In contrast, many areas of post-Soviet modern paganism, including Russian, are occupied not so much with individual self-improvement as they are occupied with social problems, and they also create nationalist ideologies based on the "invented past".

Modern paganism is one of the directions in the development of romantic nationalism with its components such as the idealization of a particular people's historical or mythological past, dissatisfaction with modernity, and the ease of transition to a radical stage with the postulation of national superiority.

Sociologist Marlène Laruelle notes the activation of "Aryan" modern paganism in the West and Russia. For example, social movements are thus developing that appeal to the Celtic past and call for a return to the "druidic religions" of pre-Christian Europe. For the most part, the French and German Nouvelle Droite share the common idea of a pan-European unity based on an "Aryan" identity and the desire to part with Christianity, the period of domination of which is seen as two thousand years of "wandering in darkness."

White supremacist ideologies and neo-Nazism, including ideas of racism, antisemitism, and anti-LGBTQ, have infiltrated or assimilated many Germanic modern pagan movements such as Odinism and some Ásatrú groups, including the Asatru Folk Assembly. These groups believe that the Germanic beliefs they hold constitute the true Caucasoid ethnic religion.

==== 19th and 20th centuries ====
Within the framework of ethnic nationalism, the volksgeist is often identified with religion, so there is a desire to create or revive one's religion or nationalize one of the world's religions. Heinrich Heine linked nationalism with paganism. The philosopher Nikolai Berdyaev, who shared Heine's opinion, noted the regularity of the tendency of the transition of German antisemitism into anti-Christianity.

At the beginning of the 20th century, the spiritual crisis in Russia led to a fascination with paganism, at first ancient and then Slavic "native gods," which was especially true for the symbolists. The publicist Daniil Pasmanik (1923) wrote that consistent antisemitism should reject Judaism and Christianity. He noted that this trend had already led Germany to worship Odin and, in the future, in his opinion, would inevitably lead Russia to worship Perun.

German occultism and modern paganism arose in the early 20th century, and they became influential through teachings such as Ariosophy, gaining adherents within the far-right Völkisch movement, which eventually culminated in Nazism. The development of such ideas after World War II gave rise to Wotanism, a white nationalist modern pagan movement at the end of the 20th century.

==== Western Europe and North America ====
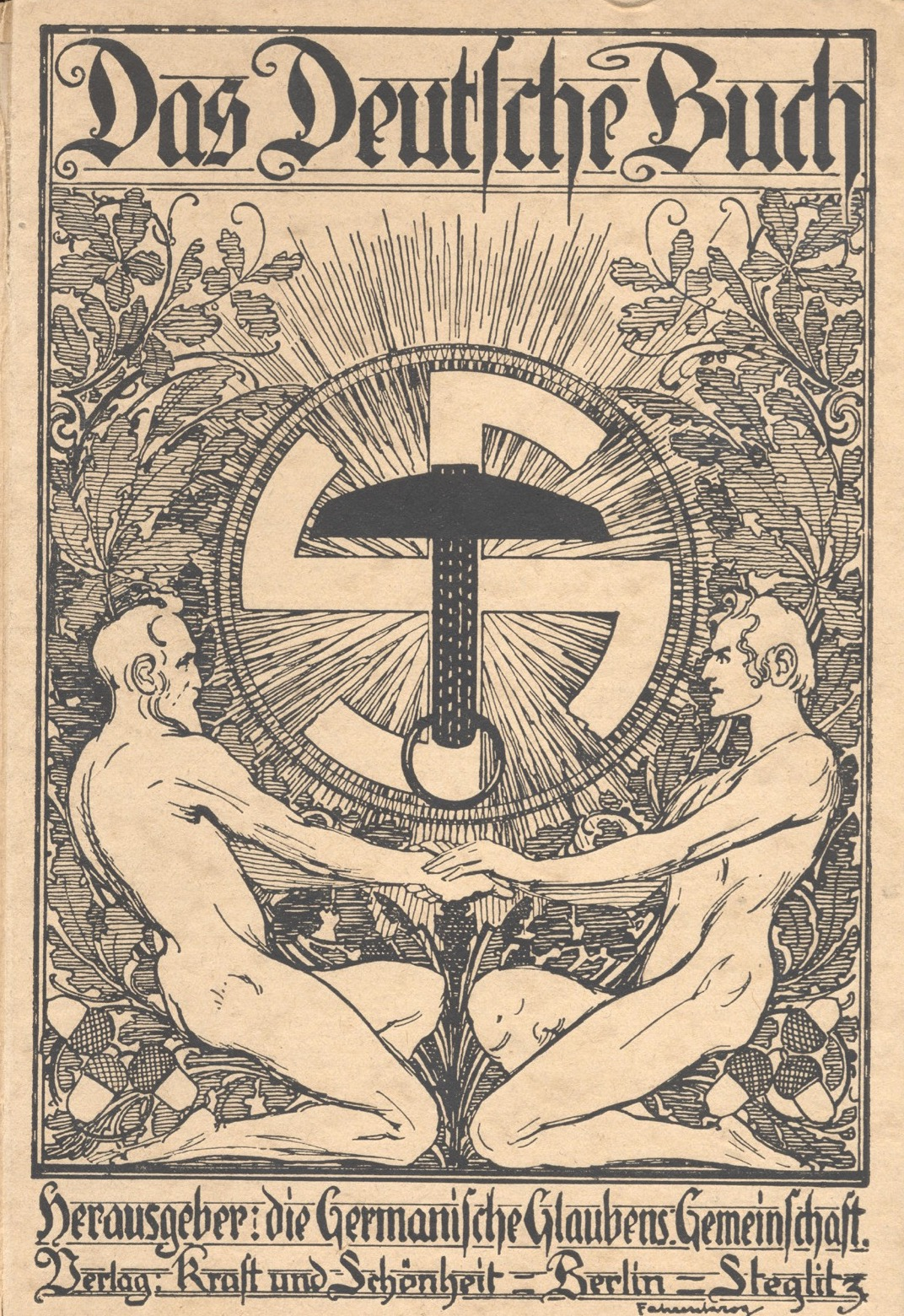
Heathen organization "Germanic Faith Community" (Germanische Glaubens-Gemeinschaft, GGG), founded by the artist and poet Ludwig Fahrenkrog, a representative of the Völkisch movement. Brochure, circa 1920.

In Germany in the late 19th and early 20th centuries, the Völkisch movement, characterized by a racist antisemitic ideology of radical ethnic nationalism of the dominant population, spread. The central elements of the worldview were racism and elitism. The movement included a religious modern pagan component. The ideology developed out of German nationalist romanticism. Nazism is considered one of the movements within the völkisch or as strongly influenced by the völkisch. Völkisch consisted of many religiopolitical groups whose leaders and followers were closely associated with each other and the developing Nazi Party. This ideology significantly impacted various aspects of German culture at the turn of the 19th and 20th centuries.

Liberalism and rationalism, which demystified the time-honored order that accepted authorities and prejudices, also caused an adverse reaction from supporters of the völkisch movement. A negative attitude towards modernity characterizes the writings of German nationalist "prophets" such as Paul Delagardie, Julius Lang, and Arthur Moeller van den Bruck. The movement combined a sentimental patriotic interest in German folklore and local history with anti-urban, back-to-the-earth populism. To overcome what they considered the ailment of scientific and rationalistic modernity, the authors of völkisch found a spiritual solution in the essence of the "people," perceived as genuine, intuitive, even "primitive," in the sense of the location of the "people" on the level with the original (primordial) cosmic order.

Völkisch thinkers tended to idealize the myth of the "original nation", which they believed could still be found in rural Germany, a form of "primitive democracy freely subject to its natural elite". The idea of the "people" (German: Volk) was subsequently transformed into the idea of "racial essence", and Völkisch thinkers understood this term as a life-giving and quasi-eternal essence and not as a sociological category, in the same way as they considered "Nature".

==== Ariosophy and Nazism ====
Modern pagan ideas were present in Ariosophy, an esoteric teaching created by the Austrian occultists Guido von List and Jörg Lanz von Liebenfels in Austria between 1890 and 1930. The term "ariosophy" can also be used generically to describe the "Aryan"/esoteric teachings of the völkisch subset. The doctrine of Ariosophy was based on pseudoscientific ideas about "Aryan" purity and the mystical unity of spirit and body. It was influenced by the German nationalist völkisch movement, the theosophy of Helena Blavatsky, the Austrian pan-German movement, and social Darwinism and its racist conclusions. Ariosophy influenced the ideology of Nazism.

The works of the Ariosophists describe the prehistoric "Aryan" golden age when the wise keepers of knowledge learned and taught occult racial teachings and ruled over a "racially pure" society. It is alleged that there is an evil conspiracy of anti-German forces, including all "non-Aryan" races, Jews, and the Christian church, seeking to destroy the ideal "Aryan" German world by freeing the "non-Aryan" mob to establish a false equality of the illegitimate (representatives of "non-Aryan" races). History, including wars, economic crises, political uncertainty, and the weakening of the power of the German principle, is seen as the result of racial mixing.

The doctrine had followers in Austria and Germany. Occultism in the doctrines of the Ariosophists was of great importance as a sacral justification for an extreme political position and a fundamental rejection of reality, including socio-economic progress. The Ariosophists sought to predict and justify the "coming era" of the German world order. To counter the modern world, "corrupted" by racial mixing, the Ariosophists created many small circles and secret religious societies to revive the "lost" esoteric knowledge and racial virtues of the ancient Germans to create a new pan-German empire.

To recreate the religion of the ancient Germans, List used the Scandinavian epic and the work of contemporary theosophists, in particular Max Ferdinand Sebaldt von Werth, who described the eugenic practices of the "Aryans", as well as The Secret Doctrine by Helena Blavatsky and The Lost Lemuria by William Scott-Elliot. Influenced by these works, List used the terms "Ario-Germans" and "race" instead of "Germans" and "people", perhaps to emphasize the overlap with the fifth root race in Blavatsky's scheme. List and Lanz developed ideas about the struggle between the "Aryan race of masters" and the "race of slaves" and about the ancestral home of the "Aryans" on the sunken polar island of Arctogea.

In Nazi Germany, Germanic pagan folklore, as a source of primordial moral standards, was revered higher than Christianity associated with Judaism. Many Nazis saw anti-Christianity as a deeper form of antisemitism. Heinrich Himmler spoke of the need to create a "neo-Germanic religion" capable of replacing Christianity. The Old Testament was especially repugnant to the Nazis. Adolf Hitler called it "Satan's Bible". Rosenberg demanded that it be banned as a "vehicle of Jewish influence" and replaced by the Nordic sagas. The Nazi ideology combined the veneration of the "pagan heritage of the ancestors" with puritanical, Christian sexual morality, which the "Nordic" Apollo was supposed to personify.

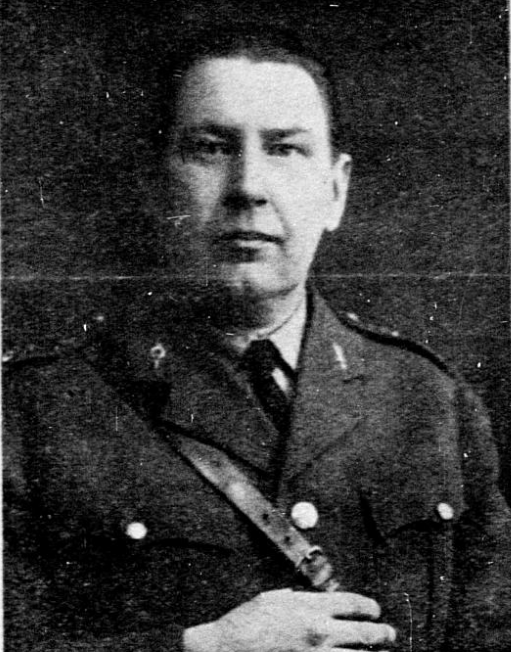
Prominent early adherent of modern Finnish paganism Ensio Uoti led the Nazi Party SSTP

==== Pagan Universalism ====
Supporters of the universalist and anti-racist approach believe that the deities of Germanic Europe can call anyone to worship them, regardless of ethnic origin. This group rejects the völkisch focus on race, believing that even unintentionally, such an approach can lead to racist attitudes towards people of non-Northern European origin. Practicing universalists such as Stephan Grundy emphasize that ancient northern Europeans married and had children with members of other ethnic groups, and in Norse mythology, the Æsir did the same with the Vanir, jötnar, and humans, so these modern pagans criticize racist views.

Universalists favorably accept practitioners of modern paganism who are not of Northern European origin; for example, The Troth, based in the United States, has Jewish and African American members, and many of its white members have spouses who belong to different racial groups. While some pagans continue to believe that Germanic paganism is an innate religion, universalists have sometimes argued that this paganism is an innate religion for the lands of Northern Europe and not for a particular race. Universalists often complain that some journalists portray modern paganism as an inherently racist movement, so they use the Internet to highlight their opposition to far-right politics.

In Heathenry, the terms "völkisch", "neo-völkisch", or the Anglicised "folkish" are used both as endonyms and exonyms for groups who believe that the religion is closely related to the claimed biological race. Völkisch practitioners consider paganism to be an indigenous religion of a biologically distinct race that is conceptualized as "White", "Nordic", "Aryan", "Northern European", or "English". Völkisch modern pagans generally regard these classifications as self-evident, despite the academic consensus that race is a cultural construct.

==== Pagan Ethnocentrism ====
Völkisch groups often use ethnonationalist language and claim that only members of these racial groups are entitled to practice a given religion, taking the pseudoscientific view that "gods and goddesses are encoded in the DNA" of the members of a race. Some practitioners explain the idea of linking their race and religion by saying that religion is inextricably linked to the collective unconscious of that race. The American modern pagan Stephen McNallen developed these ideas into a concept he called "metagenetics". McNallen and many other members of the modern pagan "ethnic" faction explicitly state that they are not racist, although Gardell has noted that their views may be considered racist under specific definitions of the term. Gardell considered many "ethnic" modern pagans to be ethnic nationalists.

Many völkisch practitioners disapprove of multiculturalism and racial mixing in modern Europe, advocating racial separatism. In online media, modern pagan völkische often express a belief in the threat of racial miscegenation, which they blame on the social and political establishment, sometimes claiming that their ideas of racial exclusivity are the result of the threat that other ethnic groups pose to "white" people. While these groups generally claim to be aiming to revive Germanic paganism, their race-centric views have their origins in 19th-century culture, not antiquity. This group's discourse contains the concepts of "ancestors" and "homeland", which are understood very vaguely. Researcher Ethan Doyle White characterizes the position of the Odinic Rite and the Odin Brotherhood as "far right".

Ethnocentric modern pagans are highly critical of their universalist counterparts, often claiming that the latter have been misled by New Age literature and political correctness. Members of the universalist and ethnocentric factions criticize those who adopt an "ethnic" stance. The former view "ethnic" modern paganism as a cover for racism, while the latter view its adherents as race traitors for their refusal to fully accept the superiority of the "white race".

Latvian fascist party Pērkonkrusts promoted Latvian paganism

Some modern pagans of the völkisch movement are white supremacists and outright racists representing a "radical racist" faction that uses the names Odinism, Wotanism, and Wodenism. According to Kaplan, these adepts occupy the "most remote corners" of modern paganism. The lines between this form of modern paganism and Nazism are "extremely thin" because its adherents praise Adolf Hitler and Nazi Germany, claim that the "white race" is threatened with extinction by the efforts of a Jewish world conspiracy, and dismiss Christianity as a work of the Jews.

==== United States ====
The issue of race is a major source of contention among modern pagans, especially in the United States. In the modern pagan community, one view is that race is entirely a matter of biological heredity, while the opposite position is that race is a social construct rooted in cultural heritage. In US modern pagan discourse, these views are described as völkische and universalist positions, respectively. The two factions, which Jeffrey Kaplan has called the "racist" and "non-racist" camps, often clash, with Kaplan claiming that there is a "virtual civil war" between them within the American modern pagan community. The division into universalists and völkisch also spread to other countries, but had less impact on the more ethnically homogeneous Iceland. A 2015 survey showed that more modern pagans adhere to universalist ideas than völkisch.

Going beyond this binary classification, religious scholar Mattias Gardell divides modern paganism in the United States into three factions according to their racial stance:

- the "anti-racist" faction, which denounces any connection between religion and racial identity
- the "radical-racist" faction, which believes that members of other racial groups should not follow their religion because racial identity is the natural religion of the "Aryan race"
- an "ethnic" faction seeking to forge a middle path by recognizing their religion's roots in Northern Europe and its connection to people of Northern European origin

Religious scholar Stephanie von Schnurbein accepted Gardell's tripartite division, and referred to these groups as the "aracist", "racial-religious", and "ethnic" factions, respectively.

Many in the inner circle of the terrorist organization The Order, a white supremacist militia operating in the US in the 1980s, called themselves Odinists. Various racist modern pagans supported the Fourteen Words slogan, which was developed by The Order member David Lane. Some racist organizations, such as the Order of Nine Angles and the Black Order, combine elements of modern paganism with Satanism, while other racist modern pagans, such as Wotanist Ron McVan, reject the syncretism of the two religions.

American neo-Nazi William Luther Pierce, the founder of the National Alliance, whose ideas stimulated neo-Nazi terrorism, also created the Cosmotheistic Community Church in 1978. He considered the teaching he created within the framework of this church to be pantheism and leaned towards the "Panaryan" Nordic cults. These cults emphasized the idea of a unique closeness of "white people" with nature and the natural "spiritual essence", which was influenced by the ideas of Savitri Devi. According to the doctrine, each race has its predestined role: "whites" are predisposed to strive for God, blacks strive for laziness, and Jews strive for corruption.

In 1985, Pierce purchased a large piece of land at Mill Point in West Virginia, fenced it in with barbed wire, and began selling books on Western culture and Western "pagan traditions" there. He aimed to save the "white race" away from the federal government. In part, he also drew on British Israelism and the racist religion of Identity Christianity. The "National Alliance" met regularly to discuss the ideas of "cosmotheism". Pierce dismissed Christianity as "one of the chief mental illnesses of our people" through which "Jewish influence" spreads. Pierce saw the proposed government after the "racial revolution" as religious, which would be "more like a holy order." He considered the future religion of the "white race" the "Aryan religion" – the "cosmotheism" that he created.

==== Eastern Europe ====
Slavic neopaganism (Rodnoverie) has a close connection with Nazism, reproducing its main ideas: the "Aryan" idea, including the idea of the northern ancestral home (in Rodnoverie, it is in the Russian North, the Northern Urals, or beyond the Arctic Circle); the connection of their people with the "Aryans" or complete identification with them (in Rodnovery, "Slavic-Aryans"); the antiquity of one's people and its racial or cultural superiority over others; their people (or the ancient "Aryans" identified with them) are regarded as cultural traegers, distributors of high culture, founders of great civilizations of antiquity, (in Rodnoverie, Slavic or "Slavic-Aryan" "Vedic" technological precivilization, "taught" all other peoples), and creators of ancient writing (in Rodnoverie, Slavic runes); "Aryan" proto-language (in Rodnoverie, "Slavic-Aryan" or Old Slavic), from which all or many other languages of the world originated; reliance on esotericism; orientation to the faith of ancestors (hence paganism); anti-Christianity (the idea that Christians seek to enslave the people) and antisemitism (Jews as "racial enemies"); "Aryan" socialism (an integral part of the ideology of Nazism) as the most natural for its people (in Rodnoverie, the "original tribal system" of the Slavs, which is thought of as a kind of "Aryan" socialism); symbols and gestures close to or derived from Nazism, etc.

One of the main starting points for the formation of Slavic neopaganism was the search for a rationale for the national idea. Hence follows an increased interest in the origins of national self-consciousness and the national type of religiosity. In the post-Soviet period, in the conditions of the loss of the great "empire" (USSR), land, and influence and in search of internal and external enemies, neopaganism became widespread among nationalist ideologues, just like in Germany in the 1930s. In Rodnoverie, the unity of the Russian people was undergoing a new re-mythologization with an appeal for support to the ideas of the "golden age", the primordial untainted tradition, and the native land.

Historian Dmitry Shlapentokh wrote that, as in Europe, neopaganism in Russia pushes some of its adherents to antisemitism. This antisemitism is closely related to negative attitudes towards Asians, and this emphasis on racial factors can lead neopagans to neo-Nazism. The tendency of neopagans to antisemitism is a logical development of the ideas of neopaganism and imitation of the Nazis and is also a consequence of some specific conditions of modern Russian politics.

Far-right Rodnover military formations in Donbas include the Svarog, Varyag, Rusich Group and Zadruzy Krag formations.

Unlike previous regimes, the current Russian political regime and the ideology of the middle class combine support for Orthodoxy with philosemitism and a positive attitude towards Muslims. These features of the regime contributed to the formation of specific views of neo-Nazi neopagans, which are represented to a large extent among the socially unprotected and marginalized Russian youth. In their opinion, power in Russia was usurped by a cabal of conspirators, including hierarchs of the Orthodox Church, Jews, and Muslims. Contrary to external differences, these forces are believed to have united in their desire to maintain power over the Russian "Aryans".

Some associations of neopaganism, in particular Slavic, are evaluated by researchers as extremist, radical nationalists. In Russia, individual neopagan organizations and essays were included in the list of extremist organizations of the Ministry of Justice of Russia and the Federal List of Extremist Materials, respectively. In Belarus, the founder of the local Nazi Party, Aliaksei Dzermant, is also the founder of the Belarusian branch of the neo-Nazi pagan Allgermanische Heidnische Front, linked to arson and murder.

The historian and ethnologist Victor Schnirelmann considers Russian neopaganism as a direction of Russian nationalism that denies Russian Orthodoxy as an enduring national value and distinguishes two cardinal tasks that Russian neopaganism sets for itself: the salvation of Russian national culture from the leveling influence of modernization and the protection of the natural environment from the impact of modern civilization. According to Schnirelmann, "Russian neopaganism is a radical variety of conservative ideology, which is distinguished by frank anti-intellectualism and populism."

Religious scholar Alexei Gaidukov considers it wrong to reduce the diversity of native faith groups to nationalism only – he views the ecological direction of Rodnovery as no less significant. Historian and religious scholar Roman Shizhensky believes Rodnovery poses little danger and law enforcement agencies should deal with radical groups.

The Austrian occultist Guido von List, who created the doctrine of Ariosophy, argued that an ancient developed "Ario-Germanic" culture reached its dawn several millennia before Roman colonization and Christianity. According to him, before Charlemagne's forced introduction of Christianity, Wotanism was practiced in what is now the Danubian territory of Germany. List considered Charlemagne the killer of the Saxons in memory of the bloody baptism of the pagans of Northern Germany by him. List considered the entire Christian period as an era of cultural decline, oblivion of the true faith, and unnatural racial mixing, when the "Aryan" ruling caste of priest-kings was forced to hide, secretly saving their sacred knowledge, which now became available to List as a full-fledged aristocratic descendant of this caste.

In Slavic neopaganism, there is the idea of an ancient multi-thousand-year-old and developed civilization of the "Slavs-Aryans", while the entire Christian period seems to be an era of regression and decline, the enslavement of the "Aryans" by foreign missionaries who imposed on them a "slave" (Christian) ideology. Rodnovers often regard these missionaries as Jews, "Judeo-Masons", or their accomplices. At the same time, the Slavic "Aryan" volkhvs or priests had to hide in secret places, preserving the knowledge that was now passed onto their direct descendants, Rodnovers.

The idea of the Jewish-Khazar origin of Prince Vladimir the Great is popular, explaining why he introduced Christianity, an instrument for the enslavement of the "Aryans" by Jews, and staged the genocide of the pagan Slavs. Roman Shizhensky singles out the neopagan myth about Vladimir and characterizes it as one of the most "odious" neopagan historical myths and one of the leading Russian neopagan myths in terms of worldview significance.

The author of this myth is Valery Yemelyanov, one of the founders of Russian neopaganism, who expounded it in his book Dezionization (1970s). Shizhensky notes that the neopagan myth about Vladimir contradicts scientific work on the issue and the totality of historical sources.

Concerning the trend of convergence of neopagan associations from different countries, Andrey Beskov notes that neopagan nationalism is not an obstacle to "neopagan internationalism", and anti-globalism, one of the manifestations of which was the popularity of ethnic religions, itself acquires a global character.

=== LGBTQ ===
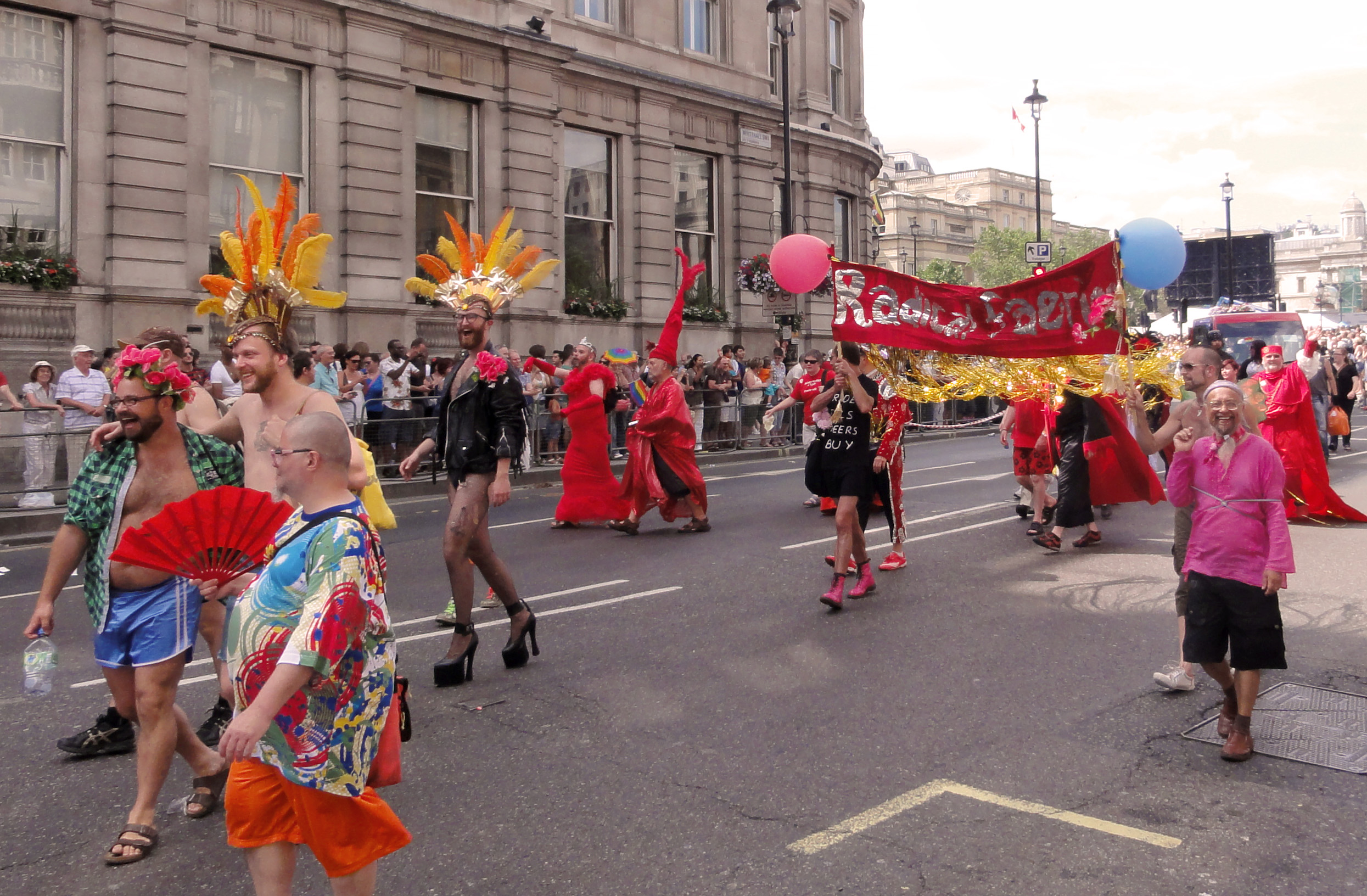
Radical Faeries with banner at 2010 London Gay Pride

The western LGBTQ community, often marginalized and/or outright rejected by Abrahamic-predominant mainstream religious establishments, has often sought spiritual acceptance and association in neopagan religious/spiritual practice. Pagan-specializing religious scholar Christine Hoff Kraemer wrote, "Pagans tend to be relatively accepting of same-sex relationships, BDSM, polyamory, transgender people, and other expressions of gender and sexuality that are marginalized by mainstream society." Conflict naturally arises, however, as some neopagan belief systems and sect ideologies stem from fundamental beliefs in the male–female gender binary, heterosexual pairing, resulting heterosexual reproduction, and/or gender essentialism.

In response, groups and sects inclusive of or specific to LGBTQ people have developed. Theologian Jone Salomonsen noted in the 1980s and 1990s that the reclaiming movement of San Francisco featured an unusually high number of LGBTQ people, particularly bisexuals. Margot Adler noted groups whose practices focused on male homosexuality, such as Eddie Buczynski's Minoan Brotherhood, a Wiccan sect that combines the iconography from ancient Minoan religion with a Wiccan theology and an emphasis on men who love men, and the eclectic pagan group known as the Radical Faeries. When Adler asked one gay male pagan what the pagan community offered members of the LGBTQ community, he replied, "A place to belong. Community. Acceptance. And a way to connect with all kinds of people – gay, bi, straight, celibate, transgender – in a way that is hard to do in the greater society."

Transgender existence and acceptability is especially controversial in many neopagan sects. One of the most notable of these is Dianic Wicca. This female-only, radical feminist variant of Wicca allows cisgender lesbians but not transgender women. This is due to the Dianic belief in gender essentialism; according to founder Zsuzsanna Budapest, "you have to have sometimes [sic] in your life a womb, and ovaries and [menstruate] and not die". This belief and the way it is expressed is often denounced as transphobia and trans-exclusionary radical feminism.

Trans exclusion can also be found in Alexandrian Wicca, whose founder views trans individuals as melancholy people who should seek other beliefs due to the Alexandrian focus on heterosexual reproduction and duality.

=== Relationship with the New Age movement ===
Neopagan practices highlight the centrality of the relationship between humans and nature and reinvent religions of the past, while New Agers are more interested in transforming individual consciousness and shaping the future.

— Religious studies scholar Sarah Pike.

Since the 1960s and 1970s, contemporary paganism, or neo-paganism, and the then emergent counterculture, New Age, and hippie movements experienced a degree of cross-pollination. An issue of academic debate has been regarding the connection between these movements. Religious studies scholar Sarah Pike asserted that in the United States, there was a "significant overlap" between modern paganism and New Age, while Aidan A. Kelly stated that paganism "parallels the New Age movement in some ways, differs sharply from it in others, and overlaps it in some minor ways". Ethan Doyle White stated that while the pagan and New Age movements "do share commonalities and overlap", they were nevertheless "largely distinct phenomena." Hanegraaff suggested that whereas various forms of contemporary paganism were not part of the New Age movement – particularly those who pre-dated the movement – other pagan religions and practices could be identified as New Age. Various differences between the two movements have been highlighted; the New Age movement focuses on an improved future, whereas the focus of Paganism is on the pre-Christian past. Similarly, the New Age movement typically propounds a universalist message which sees all religions as fundamentally the same, whereas paganism stresses the difference between monotheistic religions and those embracing a polytheistic or animistic theology. Further, the New Age movement shows little interest in magic and witchcraft, which are conversely core interests of pagan religions such as Wicca.

Many pagans have sought to distance themselves from the New Age movement, even using "New Age" as an insult within their community, while conversely many involved in the New Age have expressed criticism of paganism for emphasizing the material world over the spiritual. Many pagans have expressed criticism of the high fees charged by New Age teachers, something not typically present in the pagan movement.

=== Relationship with Hinduism ===
Because of their common links to the Proto-Indo-European culture, many adherents of modern paganism have come to regard Hinduism as a spiritual relative. Some modern pagan literature prominently features comparative religion involving European and Indian traditions. The ECER has made efforts to establish mutual support with Hindu groups, as has the Lithuanian Romuva movement.

In India, a prominent figure who made similar efforts was the Hindu revivalist Ram Swarup, who pointed out parallels between Hinduism and European and Arabian paganism. Swarup reached out to modern pagans in the West and also had an influence on Western converts to Hinduism or pro-Hindu activists, notably David Frawley and Koenraad Elst, who both have described Hinduism as a form of paganism. The modern pagan writer Christopher Gérard has drawn much inspiration from Hinduism and visited Swarup in India. Reviewing Gérard's book Parcours païen in 2001, the historian of religion Jean-François Mayer described Gérard's activities as part of the development of a "Western-Hindu 'pagan axis'".

=== Prejudice and opposition ===
In the Islamic world, pagans are not considered people of the book, so they do not have the same status as Abrahamic religions in Islamic religious law for example, Muslim men cannot marry pagan women while they are allowed to marry among people of the book; and Muslims can eat meat of halal animals that are slaughtered by people of the book, but not that slaughtered by methods of other religions.

Regarding European paganism, In Modern Paganism in World Cultures: Comparative Perspectives Michael F. Strmiska writes that "in pagan magazines, websites, and Internet discussion venues, Christianity is frequently denounced as an antinatural, antifemale, sexually and culturally repressive, guilt-ridden, and authoritarian religion that has fostered intolerance, hypocrisy, and persecution throughout the world." Further, there is a common belief in the pagan community that Christianity and paganism are opposing belief systems. This animosity is flamed by historical conflicts between Christian and pre-Christian religions, as well as the perceived ongoing Christian disdain from Christians. Some pagans have claimed that Christian authorities have never apologized for the religious displacement of Europe's pre-Christian belief systems, particularly following the Roman Catholic Church's apology for past antisemitism in its A Reflection on the Shoah. They also express disapproval of Christianity's continued missionary efforts around the globe at the expense of indigenous and other polytheistic faiths.

Some Christian authors have published books criticizing modern paganism, while other Christian critics have equated paganism with Satanism, which is often portrayed as such in mainstream entertainment industry.

In areas such as the US Bible Belt, where conservative Christian dominance is strong, pagans have faced continued religious persecution. For instance, Strmiska highlighted instances in both the US and UK in which school teachers were fired when their employers discovered that they were pagan. Thus, many pagans keep their religion private to avoid discrimination and ostracism.

=== Pagan studies ===
The earliest academic studies of contemporary paganism were published in the late 1970s and 1980s by scholars like Margot Adler, Marcello Truzzi and Tanya Luhrmann, although it was not until the 1990s that the actual academic field of pagan studies properly developed, pioneered by academics such as Graham Harvey and Chas S. Clifton. Increasing academic interest in paganism has been attributed to the new religious movement's increasing public visibility, as it began interacting with the interfaith movement and holding large public celebrations at sites like Stonehenge.

The first international academic conference on the subject of pagan studies was held at the University of Newcastle upon Tyne, North-East England in 1993. It was organised by two British religious studies scholars, Graham Harvey and Charlotte Hardman. In April 1996 a larger conference dealing with contemporary paganism took place at Ambleside in the Lake District. Organised by the Department of Religious Studies at the University of Lancaster, North-West England, it was entitled "Nature Religion Today: Western Paganism, Shamanism and Esotericism in the 1990s", and led to the publication of an academic anthology, entitled Nature Religion Today: Paganism in the Modern World. In 2004, the first peer-reviewed, academic journal devoted to pagan studies began publication. The Pomegranate: The International Journal of Pagan Studies was edited by Clifton, while the academic publishers AltaMira Press began release of the Pagan Studies Series. From 2008 onward, conferences have been held bringing together scholars specialising in the study of paganism in Central and Eastern Europe.

The relationship between pagan studies scholars and some practising pagans has at times been strained. The Australian academic and practising pagan Caroline Jane Tully argues that many pagans can react negatively to new scholarship regarding historical pre-Christian societies, believing that it is a threat to the structure of their beliefs and to their "sense of identity". She furthermore argues that some of those dissatisfied pagans lashed out against academics as a result, particularly on the Internet.

== Criticism ==
Neopaganism has been criticized on a variety of fronts, ranging from pseudohistory to racial issues to institutional issues. As neopaganism is not a unified religion, it means that the criticisms of certain groups often do not apply to other groups. Criticisms of specific neopagan groups range from criticisms of their belief in gender essentialism to criticisms of some belief in nationalism.

== See also ==
- Adyghe Xabze
- List of neopagan movements
- Modern paganism in the United States
- Modern paganism in the United Kingdom
