= Adonism =

Neopagan religion

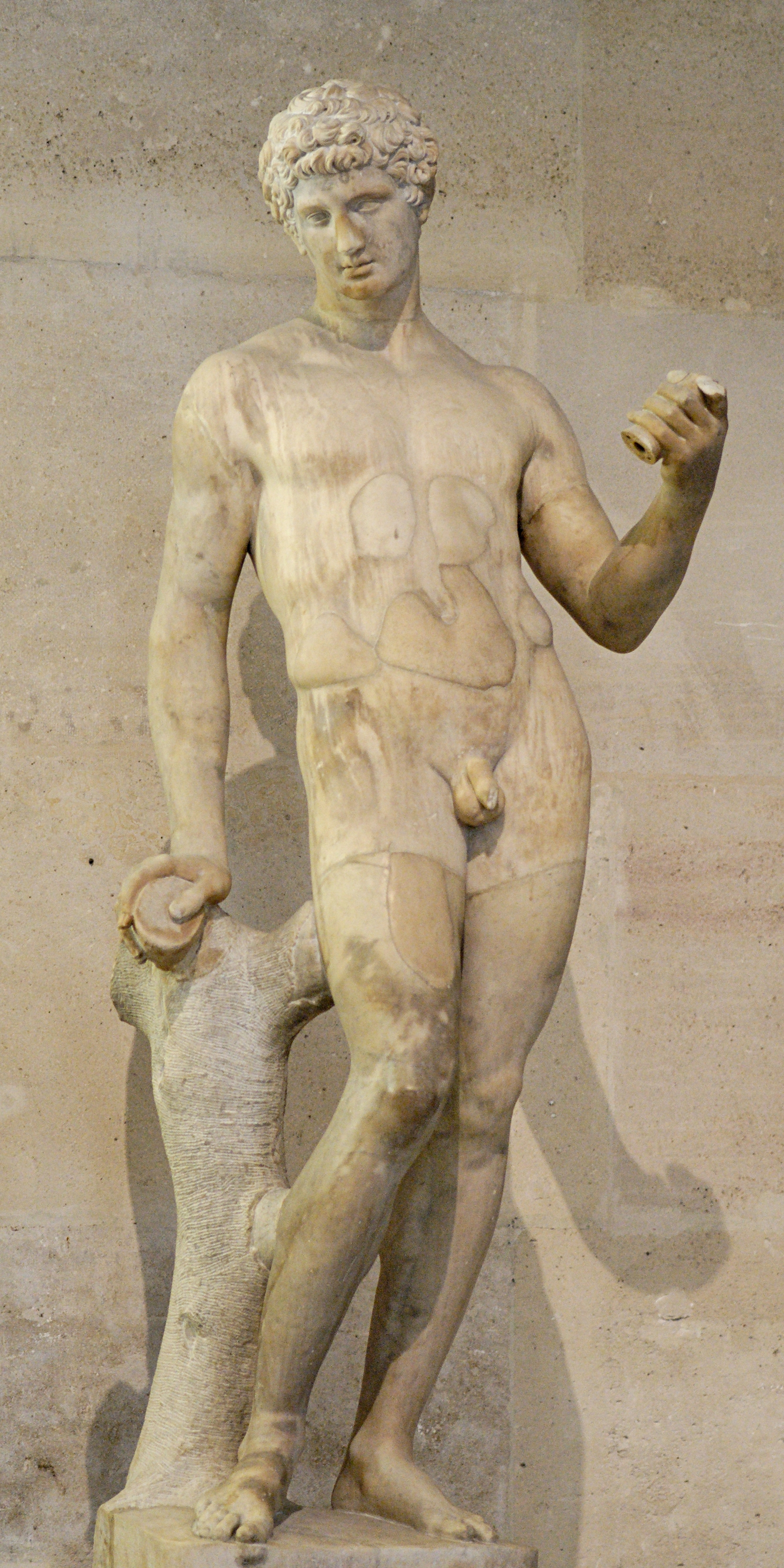
Statue of the Roman deity Adonis, who is revered as the primary deity in Adonism.

Adonism is a Neopagan religion founded in Austria in 1926 by the German esotericist Franz Sättler (1884 – c.1942), who often went by the pseudonym of Dr. Musalam. Although Sättler claimed that it was the continuation of an ancient pagan religion, it has been recognised by academics as being "instead the single-handed creation of a highly gifted and educated man", this figure being Sättler himself. Adonism is a polytheistic religion, revolving around a belief that there are five principal gods: Belus, Biltis, Adonis, Dido and Molchos. Adonis is the most prominent of these in the group's theology, being a benevolent figure that Sättler equated with the Christian figure of Satan. In contrast to Adonis, Molchos is believed by Adonists to be malevolent, and to be responsible for the enslavement of humanity through monotheistic religions such as Judaism, Christianity and Islam: the religion therefore has "a pronounced anti-Christian bias".

Born into the Bohemian region of the Austro-Hungarian Empire, Franz Sättler proved himself to be a talented linguist, gaining a doctorate in the subject and publishing the world's first Persian-German dictionary. Subsequently, travelling across much of Europe, he was imprisoned by the French during the First World War, where he first came across Theosophy and the occult, topics which greatly interested him. Briefly becoming an intelligence agent for the Czechoslovak government, he was again arrested and imprisoned, this time in Germany, and whilst imprisoned here he began formulating some of his esoteric ideas and writing books on the subject. Released in the mid-1920s, he went on to begin propagating Adonism through the foundation of his Adonistic Society. Sättler would face legal trouble and a public scandal due to his beliefs in the 1930s, leading to him renaming the Society the Alliance of Orion, before it was eventually shut down by the Nazi government in 1939. Sättler himself disappeared in the early years of the following decade, with some believing that he was executed by the Nazi authorities.

Scholar Hans Thomas Hakl stated that "The influence of Adonism... on the German magical scene is substantial. It definitely influenced the German magus Friedrich Wilhelm Quintscher (1893–1945)... and also the Fraternitas Saturni, the most interesting occult fraternity in modern Germany". Many of the group's adherents have also claimed that Adonism was an influence on the German magician Franz Bardon (1909–1958), although this remains debatable as Bardon's magical beliefs differed to "a noticeable degree". Hakl would also compare Sättler with two of his contemporaries in the European occult movement of the early twentieth century, the Englishman Aleister Crowley and the Armenian George Gurdjieff, but noted that he never received the posthumous fame that these two experienced.

== Beliefs and practices ==
Sättler erroneously claimed that Adonism was an ancient religion which had been followed by the Chaldeans, Phoenicians, Persians, Egyptians and Greeks. He also made the claim that it survived in part amongst the Yezidis of the Middle East, and also among the people of Nuristan (a place he considered to be separate to the actual Nuristan in Afghanistan). It was in this latter city that he claimed that there was a large temple, the "Bit Nur" (House of Light), where he claimed the original ancient Adonist scriptures were kept. Other than Sättler's claims however, there is no evidence that Nuristan or the Bit Nur have ever existed. Sättler claimed that it was in this temple that he first learned about Adonism, and where he was given the name of Dr Mussalam.

Adonism is a polytheistic religion, believing in a number of different gods, of which there are five principal deities. Adonists believe that the first two of these were the primordial god Belus and his consort Biltis, and that they emerged from Chaos. According to Adonistic beliefs, Belus and Biltis had a child, Molchos, who was a malevolent deity and who created a world populated with deformed monsters; because of the horror of it, Belus and Biltis destroyed this world, before going on to give birth to two more children, a benevolent son named Adonis and a daughter called Dido. Adonis then created our world, basing humanity upon the likeness of both himself and his sister, however Molchos then killed Adonis out of jealousy, taking control of the world. Being resurrected by Dido, Adonis then went on to try to protect humanity from Molchos' machinations, for instance telling one human, a man called Noah, to build a wooden ark to save him and the other animal species from the Great Flood.

Molchos, however, was not finished in his attempts to harm humanity. Aside from attacking them with plagues and sickness, he also sent false prophets such as Moses, Zarathustra, Jesus and Muhammad to convert people to his monotheistic worship under such names as Jehovah, Ormuzd and Allah. Within these religions that venerate Molchos, such as Zoroastrianism, Judaism, Christianity and Islam, Adonists believe that Adonis, the creator and benefactor of humanity was demonised as such figures as Satan, Ahriman and Iblis. Through the domination of these monotheistic religions, Adonists believe that Molchos maintained control of the world, but that in 2000 CE, Adonis will face Molchos in a final battle, defeating him and bringing about a Golden Age, which will last until the universe is once more subsumed under Chaos.

The primary way in which Adonis and Dido are celebrated in Adonistic religious practice is by the sensual enjoyment of sexual intercourse, both of the heterosexual and homosexual varieties. Indeed, Sättler summarised his faith by remarking that "Adonism is worship of the Devil [i.e. Adonis] with an erotic background." He was therefore a prominent proponent of sexual reform in early twentieth-century Germany, holding to beliefs that would later be legally accepted in the last decades of that century. Adonism also holds to a great belief in tolerance for other human beings, with Sättler stating that "The most important virtue of the Adonist is tolerance and the area in which he can practice it is boundless", and also holding to a personal maxim: "To understand everything means to pardon everything."

== History ==
=== Sättler's early life: 1884–1925 ===
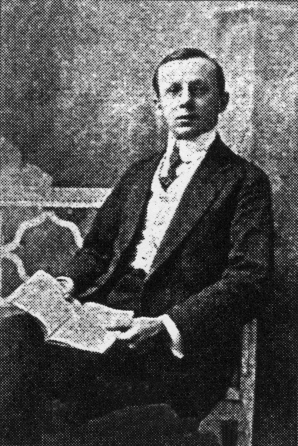
Franz Sättler

Sättler was born on 7 March 1884 as the son of a police constable in Most, a city in northern Bohemia, a Czech region which was then a part of Austria-Hungary. There he attended elementary and then grammar school, where he excelled in languages, learning Greek, Hebrew, Arabic, Ancient Greek and Latin by the time that he left. He had also begun writing for a local newspaper. He began attending the Charles University of Prague, where he initially studied philology, but becoming bored of this, switched to Oriental studies. At the university, he became a favourite student of Professor Max Grünert, who gave Sättler the notes for a Persian-German dictionary that had been left unfinished by Dr Jakob Polak. Sättler completed the task, producing the first ever dictionary between the two languages. In 1905 he travelled to Montenegro and Albania, being paid to do so by the Austrian Institute of Military Geography, who employed him to check the accuracy of their maps. The following year, he travelled to Dresden in Germany, where he met his literary idol, Karl May, whose German-language adventure novels had inspired him as a child. In the latter part of 1906 and much of 1907, he again went travelling, this time visiting Albania, Lebanon and Syria (which he used as inspiration for several novels that he would later write), and in 1908 he then travelled to the north of Europe, visiting Finland.

In 1909 he began studying for a doctorate, earning it by writing a dissertation on the Arabian dialect of Hadramaut, while in the same year marrying Anastasia Goldschmidt. Gaining employment at a private school for foreign languages in Prague, he co-wrote two books on how to study the German language with the owner of the school. Using what he described as the "direct learning method", he attempted to teach people the language using the methods developed by Jan Amos Comenius. He then worked as a private tutor both in the house of Count Khevenhüller in Beirut and the consular school in Salonika. It was while he was here that the First World War broke out across Europe, and he began travelling across the Ottoman Empire (which was on the side of the Austro-Hungarian Empire).

The French army subsequently invaded and occupied Saloniki at a time when he was staying there, and being a citizen of the Austro-Hungarian Empire, he and his wife were taken prisoner and deported to an internment camp near Lourdes in France, where he was held until 1919. It was here that he befriended the camp's chief officer, M. Parizot, who was actively involved in the esoteric movement of Theosophy. Following their many discussions on the subject, Parizot transferred his library of occult books to the camp in order that Sättler could read them. These texts included the works of such figures as Helena Blavatsky, Annie Besant, Charles Leadbeater, Camille Flammarion and Maurice Maeterlinck, and these texts "formed the intellectual basis of his later occult career."

In 1919, following the end of the war, Sättler was released from his imprisonment, and travelled to Austria, and then on to Germany, where he was apparently involved in intelligence work on behalf of the newly formed nation-state of Czechoslovakia, using the pseudonym of Dr. Erich Bauer. In 1922 he was captured by the German authorities and sentenced to a four-year imprisonment in Brandenburg an der Havel. Here, he was once more allowed the use of the prison library, writing several books, including Buch der orientalischen Geheimnisse (Book of Oriental Secrets) and Zauberbibel (Magical Bible), the latter of which was divided into seven sections, each of which looked at a different occult practice: cartomancy, astrology, the interpretation of dreams, chiromancy, magic, alchemy and necromancy. Meanwhile, Sättler divorced his wife, probably due to his affairs with other women.

=== Sättler and the Adonistic Society: 1926–1931 ===
Being released from the German prison, Sättler returned to Austria in 1926, settling down in the city of Vienna. It was here that he first began propagating Adonism through the foundation of his Adonistic Society (known as the Adonistische Gesellschaft in his native German language), and "According to its published constitution and bylaws, this group was founded on 1 May 1925 - in other words, one year before Sättler actually came back to Vienna." "By 1927 Sättler had developed the whole doctrine of Adonism and written all the major treatises on it", declaring in the Society's constitution that the main group was also accompanied by the Adonistic Publishing House, the Master Lodge Hekate in Vienna, and various study lodges scattered across the German-speaking part of Europe. Whether these genuinely existed or not is unknown, although it is quite possible that they didn't, as his Adonistic Society was relatively small, not even being a registered organisation and the Austrian authorities in fact suspected him of being guilty of criminal fraud. He also claimed that the Adonistic Society was a sister organisation to an international group known as Nizâm-el Khâf, which he claimed had branches in Bombay, Constantinople, Tehran and other major Asian cities; according to scholar Hans Thomas Hakl, this organisation was "almost certainly fictitious".

In order to entice interested individuals to join, Sättler described his Adonistic Society as a "large spiritual community" where "magical energies are continuously circulating, the inexhaustible source of which is the Master Lodge Hekate", so named after the ancient Greek goddess of witchcraft. Membership applications and payment were to be sent directly to Sättler, and new members had to wait two years before they were permitted to learn the "deeper secrets" of Adonism, before they would be allowed to subscribe to a twelve-lesson course ending in an exam, successful completion of which would allow them to attain the third degree of a Châkim Kabâlit, or a master of magic.

Sättler likely began an affair with his assistant in the Hekate Lodge, Justine Schnattinger, who herself worked under the pseudonym of "Madame Ariela" as a clairvoyant, spirit medium and astrological councillor. Sättler was also a friend of the occultist Friedrich Wilhelm Quintscher, who had joined the Society, but in 1929 their friendship broke up, possibly due to jealousy over Schnattinger. Quintscher remained devoted to the Adonist religion, continuing to propagate "its doctrine, cosmology, and principles even after he had broken with Sättler" and founding an Adonistic group called the Ateschga-Taganosyn. One of the members of this group was Brother Silias, also known as Josef Anton Schuster (1896–1968), who wrote a magical diary that became famous among the German occult movement.

=== The decline and death of Sättler: 1932–1942 ===
Although he had published a wide variety of books, both occult-based and otherwise (including a joke book), and had become entirely financially reliant on his publisher, Bartels of Berlin, he was finding it very hard to make a living. In 1929 he began selling magical cures and other items which included talismans, love potions and even powder that allegedly belonged to the Dalai Lama to supplement this income, as well as founding a stock company called Olbia-Gold, through which he defrauded stock holders by telling them that he had discovered a gold treasure at the foot of Mount Olympus in Greece. With all these money-making activities that he was involved with, he became embroiled in a financial scandal in 1932, after which various journals began accusing him of being a fraud and a criminal. Facing criminal charges for defrauding customers of the Olbia-Gold company, he fled to Greece, where he was arrested in a case of mistaken identity by police who suspected him of being "a much more important Czech swindler."

Investigating his papers in Vienna, police came upon a list of the eighty German members of the Adonistic Society, causing yet another scandal in the press, who felt it shocking that so many members of "high society" were involved with such a secretive occult group that they accused of committing sexual orgies. With Sättler out of reach, police instead began investigating Quintscher and his alternate Adonist group, but he denied a continuing connection to his former friend. Meanwhile, Sättler continued with the Society, this time based in Greece, finding a new publisher, Biosophischer Verlag, who began printing his new monthly magazine, entitled Lucifer. Finding it hard to get new members (who would bring with them the membership fees and donations that he needed to survive), Sättler dissolved the Hekate Lodge and renamed the Society the Alliance of Orion (Orion Bund in German). Nonetheless, the group was having significant problems within Germany itself as it faced opposition from the Nazi Party who had recently taken control of the government, with some figures in the regime declaring the group to be a part of a Jewish-Masonic conspiracy.

In 1935, Sättler had apparently left Greece and moved to Petržalka in Slovakia, from where he offered courses in nature healing and magic. Meanwhile, in Germany, the Nazi government banned all quasi-Masonic organisations in July 1937, and while initially the Alliance of Orion was unusually exempt, they too were illegalised in June 1939. In the early 1940s, the Nazis ordered the invasion of much of the rest of Europe, leading to the Second World War, and it was in this period that all historical trace of Sättler vanishes. It is unknown how he died, although it has been claimed that it was either in a Vienna prison or in Mauthausen concentration camp, although neither of these remain proven.

=== Adonism after Sättler: 1943–present ===
The first attempt to recreate the Adonist Society occurred in the 1950s by "an otherwise unknown" individual known as Walter Koblizek. He lived in Rosenheim near Munich in West Germany, and published a brochure announcing the re-creation of the group, but nothing more appeared of it, and Koblizek died in 1967.

Professor Adolf Hemberger (1929–1991), the holder of the chair for Scientific Theory and Methodology of Research at the University of Gießen, collected Sättler's rare works, making copies of them through mimeographing or photocopying them and distributing them among his friends and members of his magical study groups, C 72. In the 1970s, Hemberger had plans of reviving the Adonist Society, but these never came to fruition.

Another German academic, Professor Helmut Möller of the University of Göttingen, published a German language essay on Sättler in a 1990 festschrift in honour of Ellic Howe, an academic who had specialised in the study of ceremonial magical groups like the Hermetic Order of the Golden Dawn and Ordo Templi Orientis. His work was expanded upon by Hans Thomas Hakl, an Austrian independent scholar, who also made an examination of Sättler in the German language, which he followed by publishing an edited version in the English language, appearing in The Pomegranate: The International Journal of Pagan Studies (2010).

== See also ==
- Semitic neopaganism
- Demiurge
- Gnosticism
- New religious movement
