= Patchwork religion =

In the sociology of religion patchwork religion indicates situations when individual or religious movement forms its own worldview from heterogeneous elements, taken from different religions or individual religious experience. Collected from these elements, this religious world view reminds of a patchwork quilt with a unique pattern. Similar social concepts are syncretism, bricolage and sheilaism.

== History ==
Patchwork religion was first suggested by American sociologist Robert Wuthnow. Wuthnow studies aspects of American religiosity, believing that its patchwork and avoidance of keeping to strictly defined forms are its essential features. Thus he writes:

"Now, at the end of the twentieth century, growing numbers of Americans piece together their faith like a patchwork quilt. Spirituality has become a vastly complex quest in which each person seeks in his or her own way".

Patchworks of individual religiosity do not contradict loyalty to a church's official position. In his other book Wuthnow connects patchworks with a feature of American religiosity called shopping mentality. Bearers of such mentality mostly admit the existence of God or some kind of mystical force, but believe that no religion is able to explain this mystery. The framework of each religion offers good examples of penetration into mysterious spheres of the divine.

"When God is ultimately a mystery, it is easy to assume that all religions contain insights about God but no religion provides a complete understanding of God, and thus one way to increase one`s understanding of God is by gleaning ideas from many different religious traditions".

Wuthnow writes about spiritual shoppers as about people, who

"Having learned to be open-minded and to patch together ideas from many different sources".

== Collective consciousness ==
Originally patchwork religion was applied to individual religiosity. It later became used in descriptions of public worldview features. Patchwork appears in religious traditions that include elements not found in original practice. This explains dual faith and superstitions that can be characterized as interpolations, brought during a historical process. Some scientists claim that each religious tradition has a people's interpretation (for example, people's Catholicism, people's Buddhism etc.).
