= List of modern pagan movements =

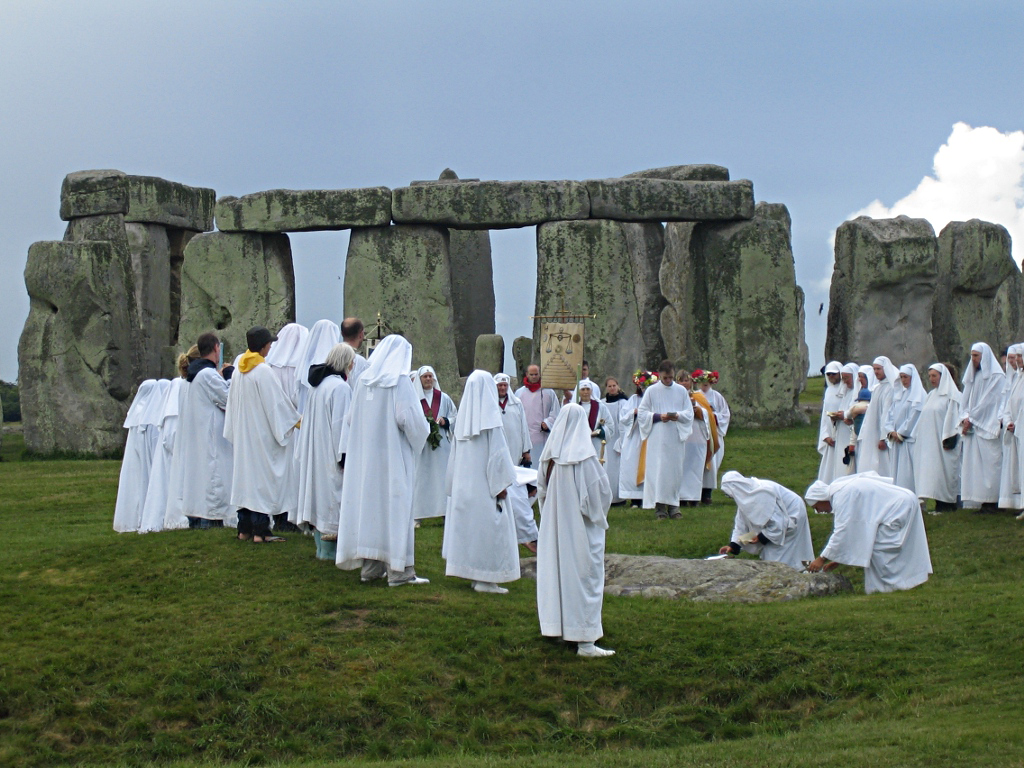
Druid gathering at Stonehenge

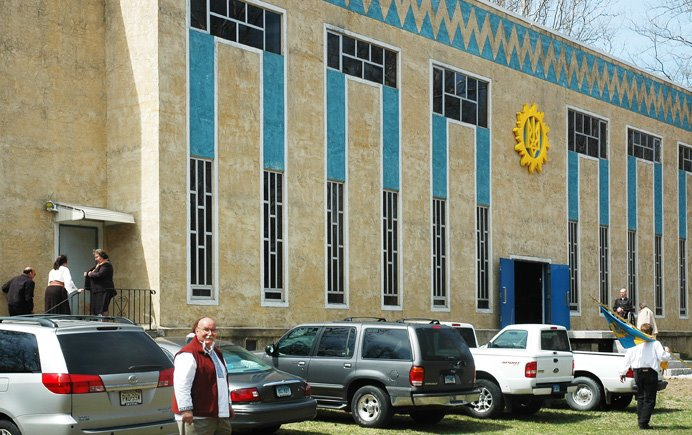
Ukrainian temple of the RUNVira in Spring Glen, New York

Modern paganism, also known as "contemporary" or "neopagan", encompasses a wide range of religious groups and individuals. These may include old occult groups, those that follow a New Age approach, those that try to reconstruct old ethnic religions, and followers of the pagan religion or Wicca.

== Early movements ==
Pre-World War II neopagan or proto-neopagan groups, growing out of occultism and/or Romanticism (Mediterranean revival, Viking revival, Celtic revival, etc.).

- Druidry
  - Ancient Order of Druids (1781)
  - The Druid Order (1909)
- Thelema (1904)
- Germanic neopaganism/Ariosophy
  - Germanische Glaubens-Gemeinschaft (1907)
  - Guido von List Society (1908)
- Church of the Universal Bond (1912)
- Adonism (1925)
- Slavic Native Faith (1920s–30s)
  - Zadruga (1937)
- Church of Aphrodite (1938)

== Ethnic and cultural ==
- European Congress of Ethnic Religions

=== Germanic ===
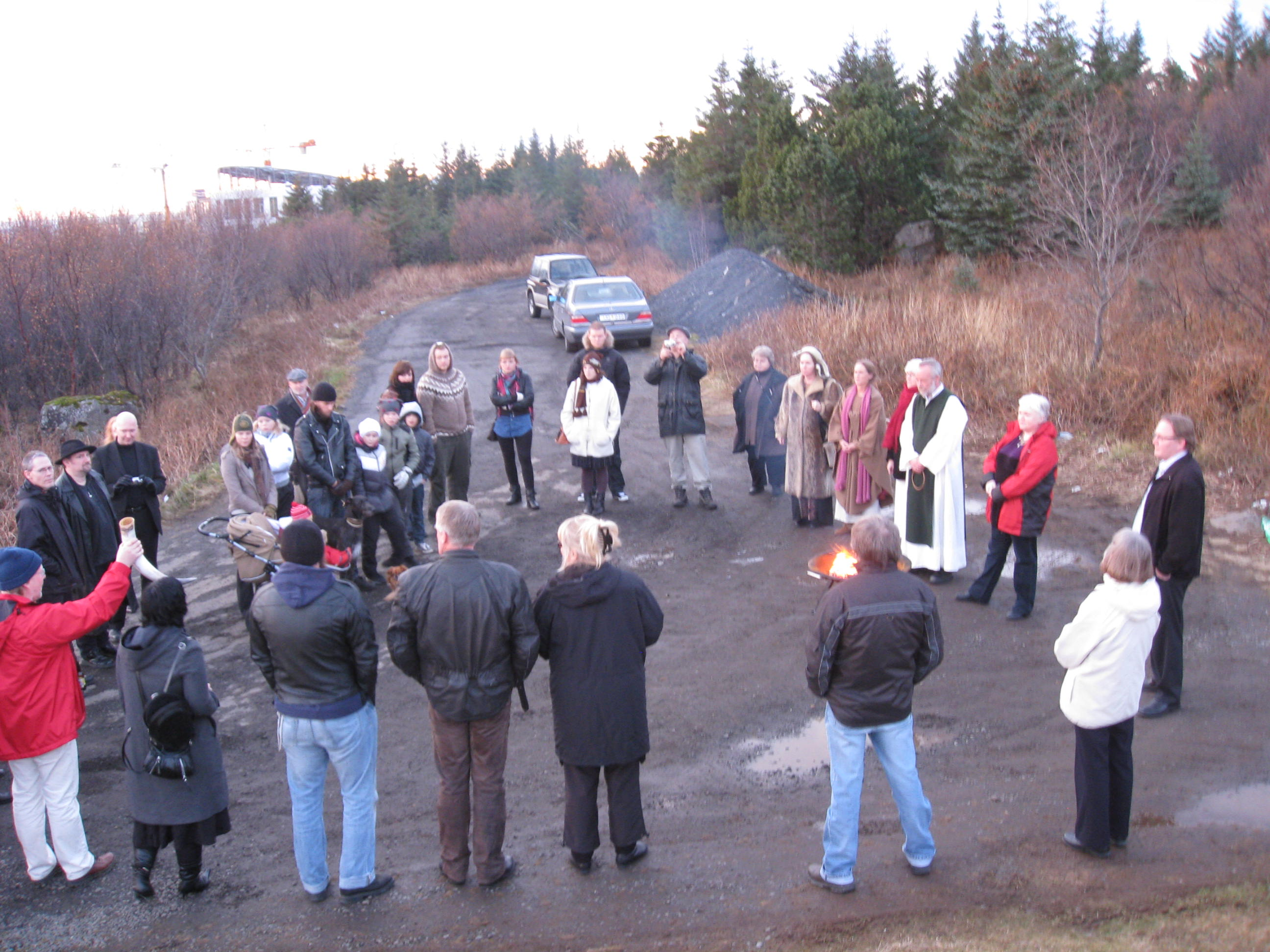
Winternights sacrifice at Öskjuhlíð, in Reykjavík

Heathenism (also Heathenry, or Greater Heathenry), is a blanket term for the whole Germanic neopagan movement. Various currents and denominations have arisen over the years within it. Some of these denominations follow white supremacy, and some of the groups listed here follow folkish ideology.

- Europe
  - Scandinavia
    - Íslenska Ásatrúarfélagið (1972)
    - Samfundet Forn Sed Sverige (1994)
    - Åsatrufellesskapet Bifrost (1996)
    - Forn Sed Norge (1998)
    - Samfälligheten för Nordisk Sed (1999)
  - United Kingdom
    - Odin Brotherhood
    - Odinic Rite (1973)
    - Odinist Fellowship (United Kingdom) (1988)
    - Asatru UK (2013)
  - German-speaking Europe
    - Artgemeinschaft (1951)
    - Heidnische Gemeinschaft (1985)
    - Deutsche Heidnische Front (1998)
    - Eldaring (2000)
  - Latin-speaking Europe
    - Odinist Community of Spain – Ásatrú (1981)
- North America
  - Heathenry in the United States
    - Asatru Free Assembly (Stephen McNallen, 1974–1986)
    - Ásatrú Alliance (1987)
    - Ring of Troth (1987)
    - Asatru Folk Assembly (1996)
    - Odinist Fellowship (United States) (Else Christensen, 1971–2005)
    - Odinic Rite (1973)
    - Wotansvolk (1995)
  - Heathenry in Canada

=== Celtic ===
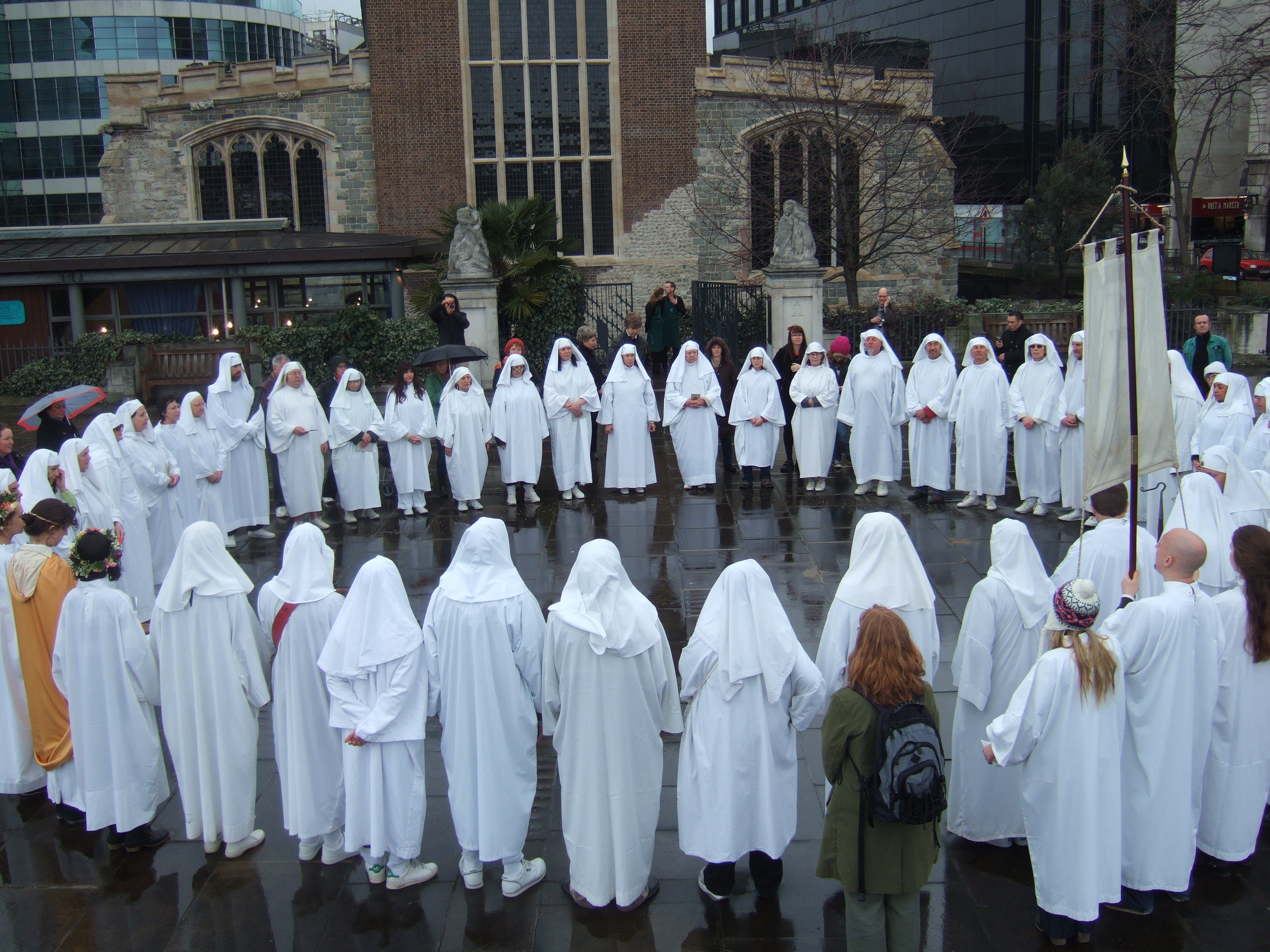
The Druid Order Ceremony at Tower Hill, London on the Spring Equinox of 2010

- Celtic Reconstructionist Paganism (1980s)
- Neo-druidism or neodruidry, or druidism or druidry
  - Dynion Mwyn (1950s/60s)
  - Reformed Druids of North America (1963)
  - Order of Bards, Ovates and Druids (1964)
  - Monastic Order of Avallon (1970)
  - Ár nDraíocht Féin (1983)

=== Italic ===
- Italo-Roman neopaganism or Religio Romana
  - Associazione Tradizionale Pietas
  - Nova Roma
  - Roman Traditional Movement
  - Pietas Comunità Gentile

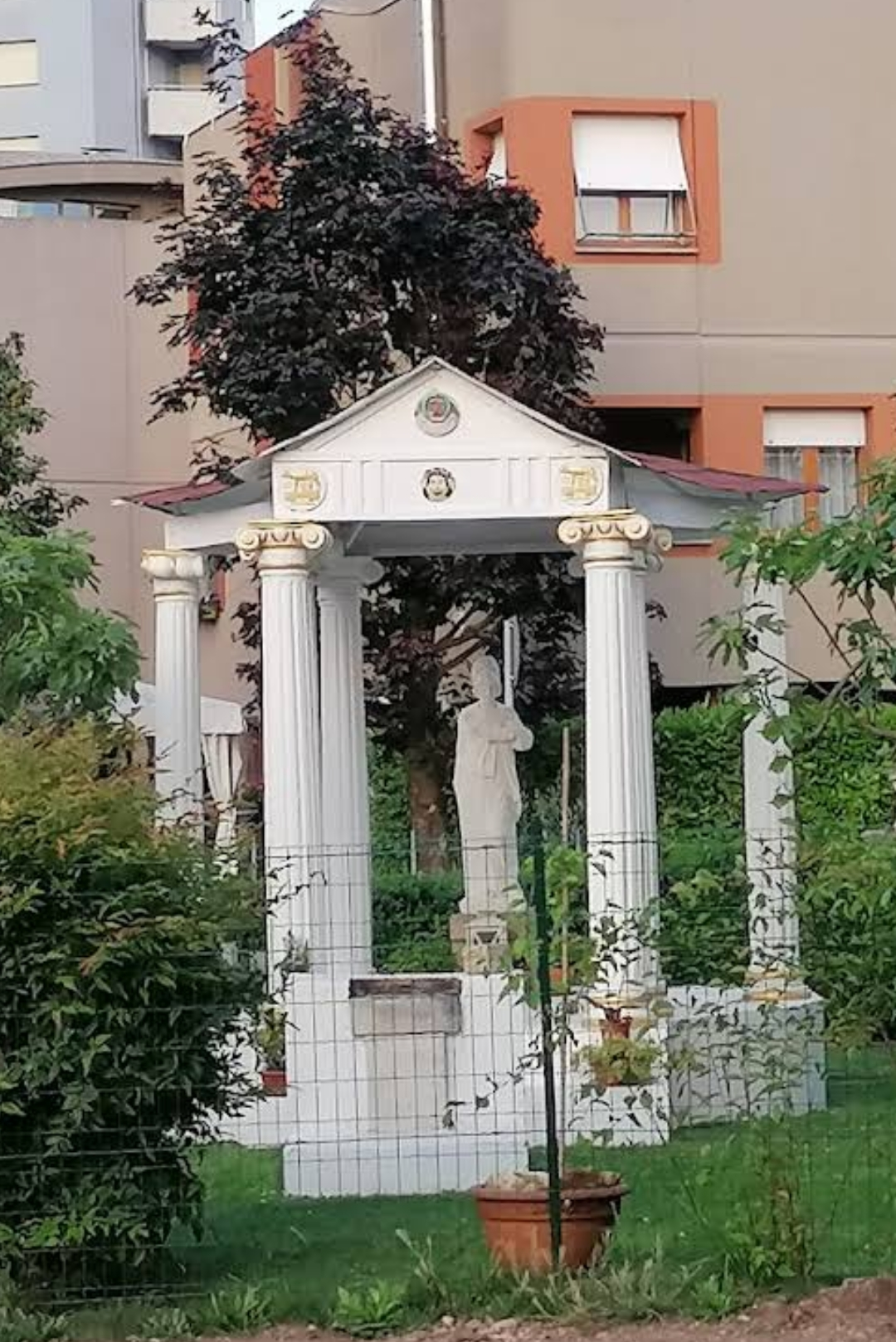
Temple of Minerva Medica in Pordenone, built by the Traditional Pietas Association

=== Hellenic ===
- Hellenism

=== Baltic ===
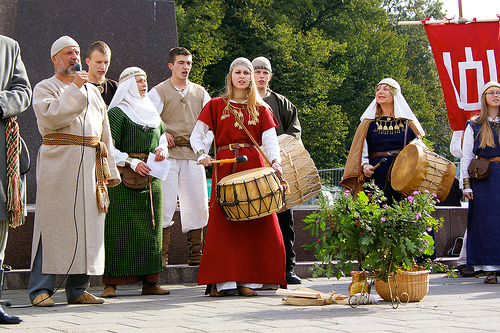
Members of the Lithuanian Romuva perform a ceremony in front of the Monument of Gediminas, in Vilnius, Lithuania

- Dievturība (Latvian)
- Romuva (Lithuanian)

=== Slavic ===
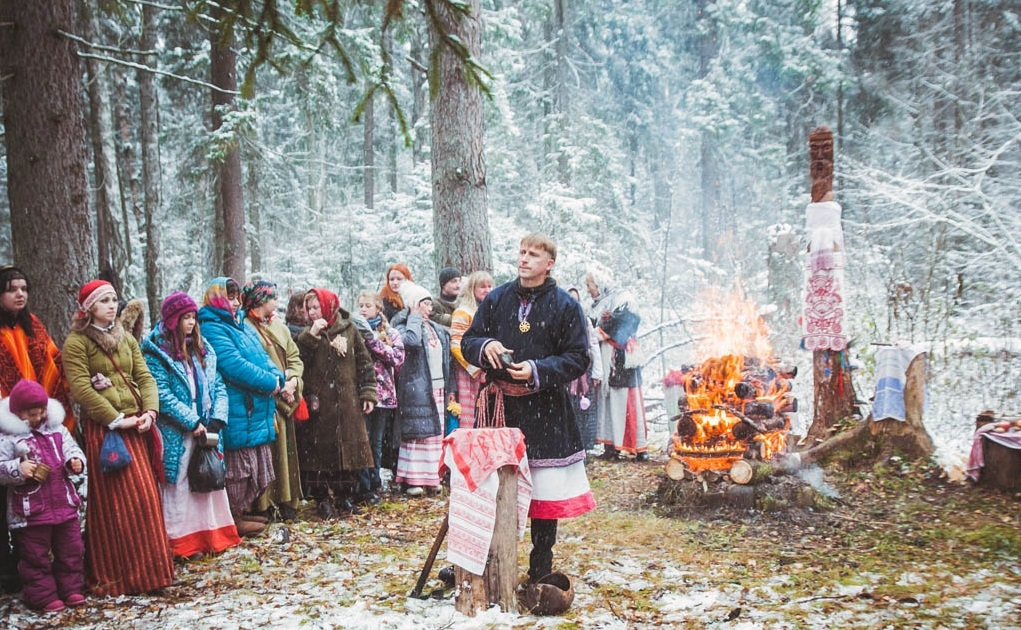
The community of the Union of Slavic Native Belief Communities celebrating Mokosh, Russia

- Rodnovery (Native Faith) (1920–30s)
  - Zadruga (1937)
    - Rodzima Wiara (1996)
  - Native Ukrainian National Faith, RUNVira (1964)
  - Peterburgian Vedism
    - Union of the Veneds (1986)
    - Skhoron ezh Sloven (1991)
  - Slavic-Hill Rodnovery (1980s)
  - Ynglism (1991)
  - Native Polish Church (1995)
  - Union of Slavic Native Belief Communities (1997)
  - AllatRa (2014)
  - Rodnover Confederation (2015)
  - Commonwealth of Pagan Communities of Siberia–Siberian Veche (2015)
- Ivanovism (1930s)
- Tezaurus Spiritual Union (Authentism) (1984)
- Russian Public Movement "Course of Truth and Unity" (Concept of Public Security "Dead Water") (1985)
- Bazhovism (1992)
- Kandybaism or Russian Religion (1992)
- Ringing Cedars' Anastasianism (1997)
- Levashovism or Russian Public Movement of Renaissance–Golden Age (2007)

=== Uralic ===
- Estonian neopaganism (Taaraism and Maausk)
  - Maavalla Koda (1995)
- Finnish neopaganism
- Hungarian neopaganism
- Mari native religion
- Mordvin native religion
- Udmurt Vos

=== Caucasian ===
- Abkhaz neopaganism
  - Council of Priests of Abkhazia (2012)
- Adyghe Habze
- Vainakh religion

=== Other European ===
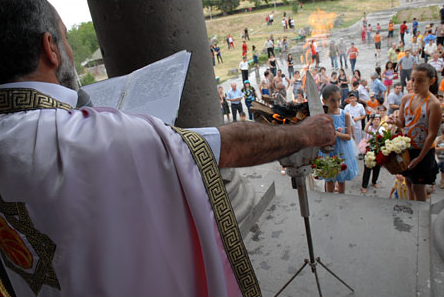
Ritual at the Temple of Garni, in Armenia

- Albanian folk believers
- Hetanism
- Assianism (Ossetian Native Faith)
- Zalmoxianism

=== Turko-Mongolic ===
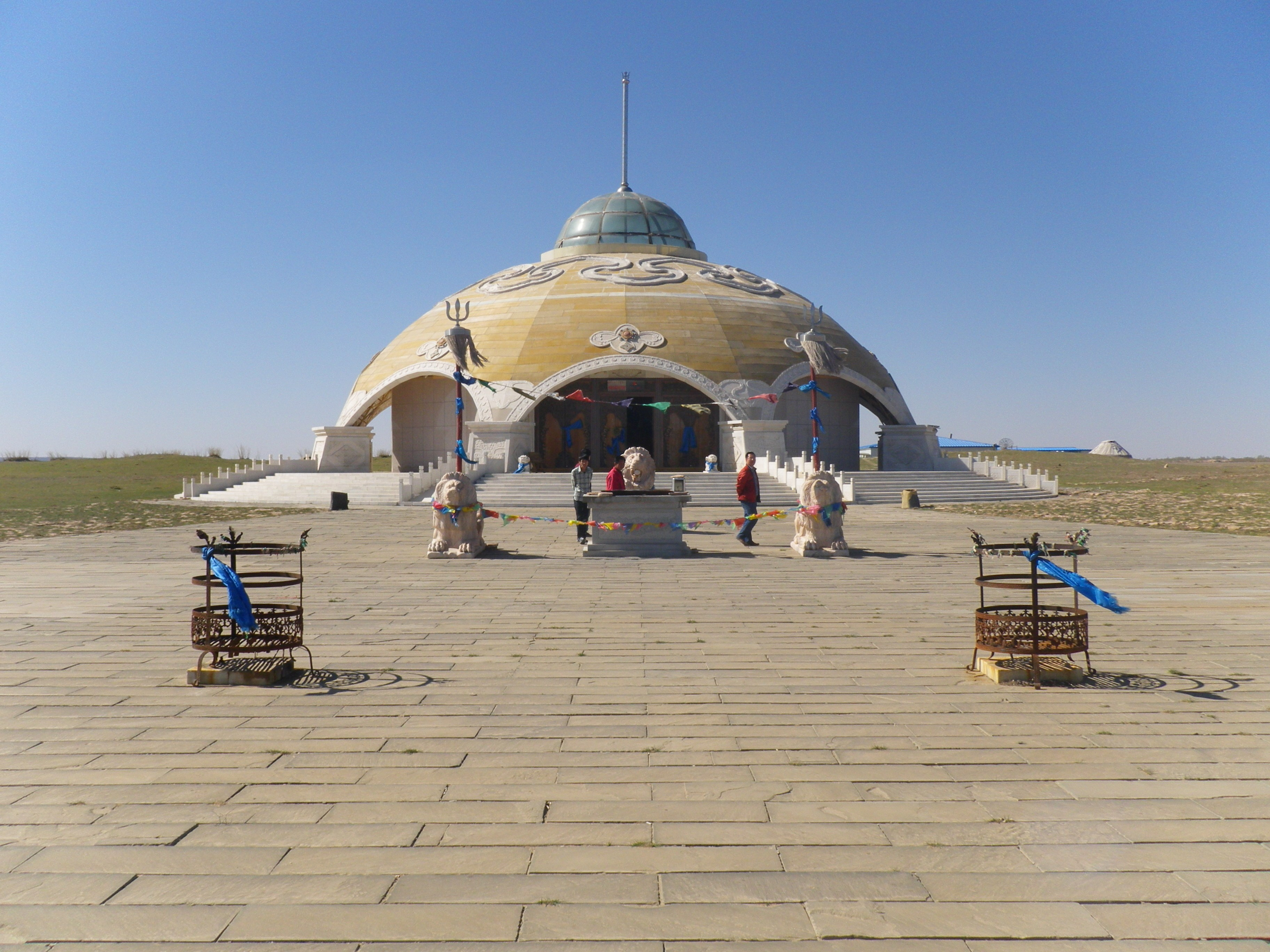
Tengrist temple of the Sülde Tngri in the town of Uxin Banner in Inner Mongolia, China

- Aar Aiyy Faith (Yakut: Аар Айыы итэҕэлэ) (1996)
- Aiyy Faith (Yakut: Айыы итэҕэлэ), former Kut-Siur (1990)
- Aiyy Tangara Faith (Yakut: Айыы Таҥара итэҕэлэ) (2019)
- Burkhanism/Ak Jang (Altay: Ак јаҥ) (1904)
- International Fund of Tengri Research (Russian: Международный Фонд Исследования Тенгри) (2011)
- Mongolian shamanism/Tengerism (Mongolian: Бөө мөргөл/Тэнгэризм)
  - Heaven's Dagger
  - Mongolian Shamans' Association (Golomt Tuv)
    - Circle of Tengerism (Mongolian shamanic association of America)
    - Golomt Center for Shamanist Studies
  - Samgaldai Center (Mongolian: Хаант Тэнгэрийн Самгалдай)
- Tengir Ordo (Kyrgyz: Теңир Ордо) (2005)
- Vattisen Yaly (Chuvash: Ваттисен йӑли)
  - Chuvash National Congress (Chuvash: Чӑваш наци конгресӗ) (1989–1992)
  - Chuvash Traditional Faith Organization "Tura" (Russian: Организация традиционной веры чувашей "Тура") (1995)

=== North African ===
- Berber neopaganism
- Church of the Guanche People
- Punic religion

=== Semitic ===
- Canaanism
- Semitic neopaganism

=== Kemetic ===
- Kemetism
  - Kemetic Orthodoxy

=== American ===
- Ausar Auset Society (1973)
- Mexicayotl
- Native American Church (late 19th century)

=== Sub-Saharan African ===
- Godianism (1948)

=== Korean ===
- Dangunism

== Wicca ==
Wicca originated in 1940s Britain (UK) and became the mainstream of neopaganism in the United States in the 1970s. There are two core traditions of Wicca which originated in Britain, Gardnerian and Alexandrian, which are sometimes referred to as British Traditional Wicca. From these two arose several other variant traditions. Wicca has also inspired a great number of other traditions in Britain, Europe and the United States, most of which base their beliefs and practices on Wicca. Many movements are influenced by the Movement of the Goddess, and New Age and feminist worldviews.

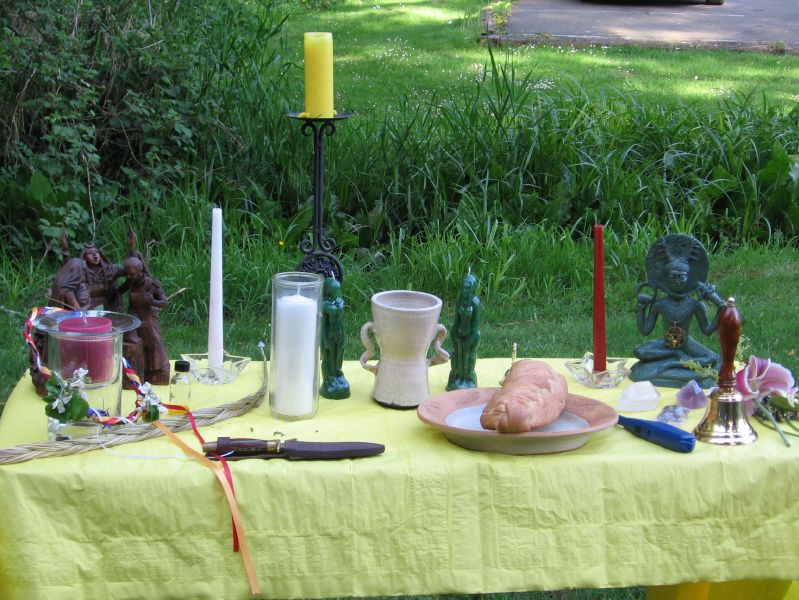
A Wiccan ritual altar

- British Traditional Wicca
  - Gardnerian Wicca (1954)
  - Alexandrian Wicca (1967)
  - Central Valley Wicca (1969)
  - Chthonioi Alexandrian Wicca (1974)
  - Blue Star Wicca (1975)
- Eclectic Wicca and Inclusive Wicca
- Celtic Wicca
- Covenant of the Goddess
- Saxon Wicca
- Dianic Wicca
  - McFarland Dianic Wicca
- Faery Wicca
- Georgian Wicca
- Odyssean Wicca
- Wiccan organization
  - New Reformed Orthodox Order of the Golden Dawn (1968)
  - Church and School of Wicca (1968)
  - Circle Sanctuary (1974)
  - Covenant of the Goddess (1975)
  - Aquarian Tabernacle Church (1979)
  - Rowan Tree Church (1979)
  - Coven of the Far Flung Net (1998)

Other Wiccan-related traditions

- Stregheria (Italian tradition)
- Hedge Witchcraft
- Cochrane's Craft
  - 1734 Tradition
- Children of Artemis
- Feri Tradition
- Reclaiming

== Eclectic or syncretic ==
- Antinous
- Church of All Worlds
- Christopaganism
- Covenant of Unitarian Universalist Pagans (1985)
- Feraferia
- Goddess movement
- Huna
- Neoshamanism
- Pagan Federation
- Radical Faeries
- Secular paganism
- Temple of Priapus
- Theta Noir
- Universal Pantheist Society

== See also ==
- List of modern pagan temples
- List of pagans
