= Modern paganism in Scandinavia =

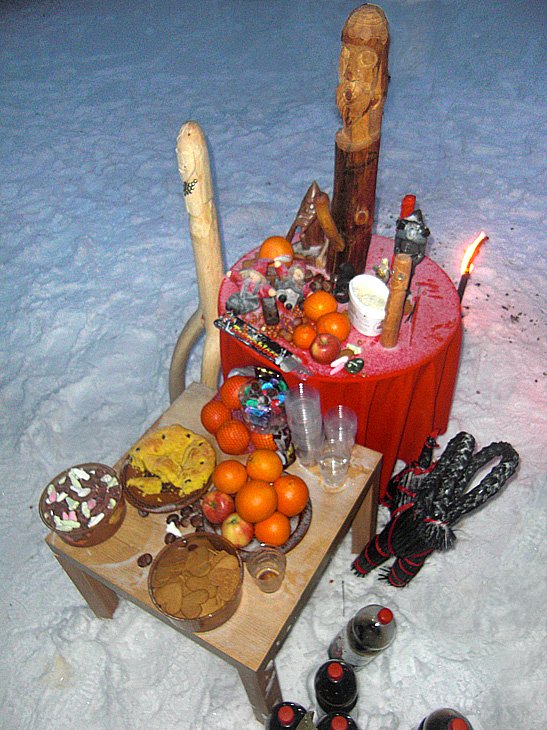
Outdoor temporary altar of the Swedish Forn Sed Association.

Modern paganism in Scandinavia is almost exclusively dominated by Germanic Heathenry, in forms and groups reviving Norse paganism. These are generally split into two streams characterised by a different approach to folk and folklore: Ásatrú, a movement that been associated with the most innovative and Edda-based approaches within Heathenry, and Forn Siðr, Forn Sed or Nordisk Sed, a movement marked by being generally more traditionalist, ethnic-focused and folklore-rooted, characterised by a worldview which its proponents call folketro ("faith of the folk", "folk religion"). Forn Siðr may also be a term for Scandinavian Heathenry in general. Vanatrú defines the religion of those individuals or groups in which the worship of the Vanir dominates.

== Religions ==
A split in classification has arisen in the Scandinavian Heathen milieu (with the exception of Iceland) and is determined by approach to historicity and historical accuracy. On one hand, there is the Ásatrú movement represented by the "Eddaic" reconstructionists who aim to understand the pre-Christian Germanic religion based on academic research and the Edda, and implement reconstructions in their practice. Contrasting with this is the Forn Siðr, Forn Sed or Nordisk Sed movement, characterised by a "traditionalist" or "folkist" approach, in Scandinavia known as fólkatrú, which emphasizes living local tradition as central.

Traditionalists will not reconstruct, but base their rituals on intimate knowledge of regional folklore. Proponents of traditionalism include the Norwegian Forn Sed Norge and the Swedish Samfälligheten för Nordisk Sed. Both religions reject the ideas of Romanticist or New Age currents as reflected in Armanism or American Asatru. At the other end of this scale are syncretist or eclectic approaches which merge innovation or "personal gnosis" into historical or folkloric tradition. The "folkists" define their religion as Nordisk Sed ("Nordic Custom"), preferring this term over Ásatrú, which is mostly associated with the "eclectic" reconstructionists.

== By country ==
=== Denmark ===
In Denmark the Forn Siðr — Ásatrú and Vanatrú Association in Denmark was formed in 1999, and officially recognized in 2003.

=== Norway ===
Two Pagan organizations are recognized by the Norwegian government as religious societies: Åsatrufellesskapet Bifrost formed in 1996 (Asatru Fellowship "Bifrost"; with some 300 members as of 2011) and Forn Sed Norge formed in 1998 (with some 85 members as of 2014). Being recognized by the government allows them to perform "legally binding civil ceremonies". Forn Sed Norge is a member of the European Congress of Ethnic Religions. A third group, Vigrid, makes racial teachings a part of their ideological framework, as well as using Nazi Germany's flag colors and structure in their banner. For this reason many consider them to be neo-Nazis. Vigrid has also influenced Norway's view on pagan symbols, causing many Norwegians to believe that the symbols are racist in nature. Researcher Egil Astrem suggests that a "moral panic" arose regarding paganism being viewed as linked to Satanism within broader Norwegian society, and viewed as a threat to the stability of moral community within the nation.

=== Sweden ===
In Sweden, Sveriges Asatrosamfund formed in 1994, and renamed to Swedish Forn Sed Assembly (Samfundet Forn Sed Sverige) in 2010. At present it is the second largest national organization for heathenry. The largest organization is the Nordic Asa-Community, formed in 2014. A difference between the two is that the Sweden Forn Sed Assembly takes an explicitly political stance on issues such as xenophobia, whereas the Nordic Asa-Community asserts to be non-political and has banned political symbols from its activities. A number of independent local groups (blotlag) also exist. Some of these used to be part of Nätverket Forn Sed ("The Forn Sed Network") when it was operational. Another group operational in the country is Samfälligheten för Nordisk Sed ("Community for Nordic Sed").

=== Iceland ===
Ásatrúarfélagið was recognized as a religious organization by the Icelandic government in 1973. Its first leader was farmer and poet Sveinbjörn Beinteinsson. It is the largest non-Christian religious organization in Iceland and has some 3,583 members (as of January 1st, 2017), making up just over 1% of the total population. Another group is the Reykjavíkurgoðorð.
