= American neopaganism =

American neopaganism may refer to:

- Modern paganism in the United States
  - Heathenry in the United States
- Heathenry in Canada
