= Robert Stenkvist =

Swedish politician (born 1958)

Robert Stenkvist SD

Member of the Swedish Parliament for Västra Götaland County East
- Incumbent
- Assumed office 30 September 2014

Personal details
- Born: 10 June 1958 (age 68) Farsta Parish, Stockholm County, Sweden
- Party: Sweden Democrats

Robert Olov Stenkvist (born 10 June 1958 in Farsta Parish, Stockholm County) is a Swedish politician for the Sweden Democrats (SD), and youth worker, living in Botkyrka Municipality. He has been a member of the Riksdag for the Sweden Democrats since the 2014 general elections. He initially served as a substitute member of the Riksdag, taking over from Christoffer Dulny who had been asked by the SD to resign his seat following a series of controversies before becoming a full member of the Riksdag. He is currently taking up seat number 176 and is a member of the Education Committee since April 2015, a position he was an alternate for before becoming a member.

Stenkvist became a member of the Sweden Democrats in 2004. He was the spokesperson for the Sweden Democrats in Stockholm County. Before he was elected as a member of the Riksdag he worked as a political secretary in the Riksdag from 2010 until his election in 2014.

During his campaign for the Riksdag in 2014, he was known as being one out of two Sweden Democrats who did not want to have a ban on begging.

== Personal life ==
He is a member of the Nordic Asa-Community.
