= Christoffer Dulny =

Swedish politician and activist

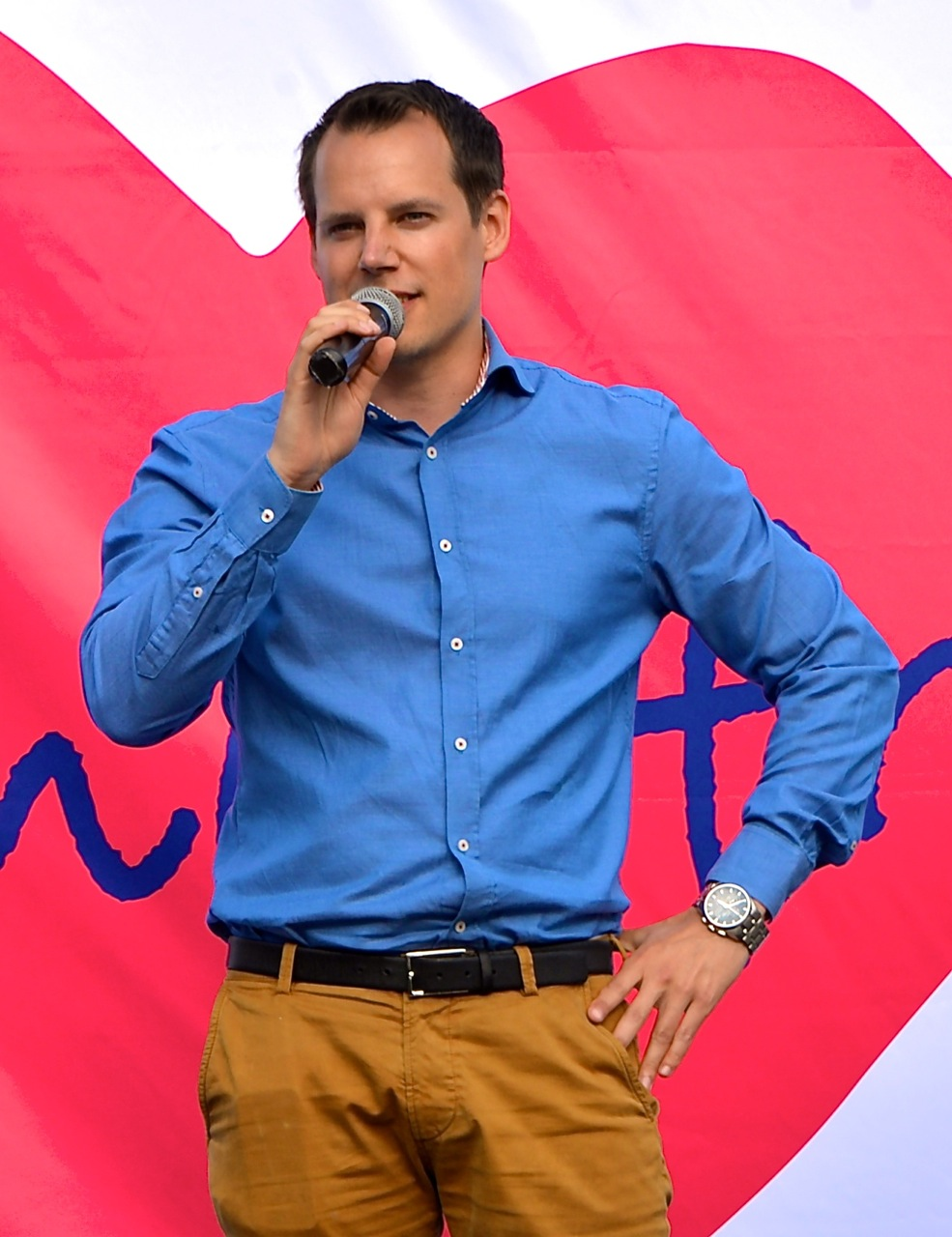

Member of the Riksdag
- In office 2014–2014
- Succeeded by: Robert Stenkvist
- Constituency: Västra Götaland County

Personal details
- Born: 29 November 1983 (age 42) Enskede, Sweden
- Party: Sweden Democrats (2010-2017)

Christoffer Robin Lech Dulny (born 29 November 1983) is a Swedish former politician and far-right activist.

He was chairman of the Sweden Democrats party in Stockholm and served as their spokesman on law and policing before he became a member of the Riksdag for the party during the 2014 Swedish general election. He resigned his parliamentary seat the same year. He has since left the party and founded the alt-right influenced Nordisk Alternativhöger (Nordic Alternative Right).

== Biography ==
Dulny was born in 1983. He holds a law degree and worked at the Riksdag Chancellery as a secretary and a civil servant before becoming a media coordinator for the Sweden Democrats at the 2010 Swedish general election. He briefly served as the SD spokesman on policing. In September 2014, he became chairman of the Sweden Democrats' chapter in Stockholm and was elected as a municipal councilor on Stockholm City Council. During the 2014 Swedish general election, he was elected to the Riksdag as the 42nd candidate on the SD list and represented the constituency of Västra Götaland County.

In September 2014, Swedish newspaper Expressen revealed that Dulny had written comments that were described as racist and xenophobic on several websites (including Avpixlat) under an anonymous username, including one in which he described Roma people and Muslims as having a "violent gene" and another in which he described immigrants as "absolutely the worst at lying, manipulating, making shady deals, causing problems, etc." Following the revelations, Dulny stated in an interview with Sveriges Television that his comments were "inappropriate" but he did not think his views prevented him from working as a politician. However, SD leader Jimmie Åkesson condemned Dulny's actions and said the party would review his membership.

Dulny subsequently stood down as leader of the SD in Stockholm and later resigned from the SD's parliamentary group at the request of the party. His Riksdag seat was turned over to Robert Stenkvist.

== Nordic Alternative Right ==
Dulny continued to work at the Sweden Democrats' parliamentary office as a press officer until May 2017 when he formed a new far-right political movement called the Nordic Alternative Right. The Sveriges Television political show Assignment Review has described the movement's ideas as inspired by the American alt-right. Dulny was subsequently suspended from SD due to this and later quit the party.
