= Community of Forn Sed Sweden =

Heathen (Germanic neopagan) organization founded in 1994

Swedish Asatro Community
- Community of Forn Sed Sweden
- Samfundet Forn Sed Sverige
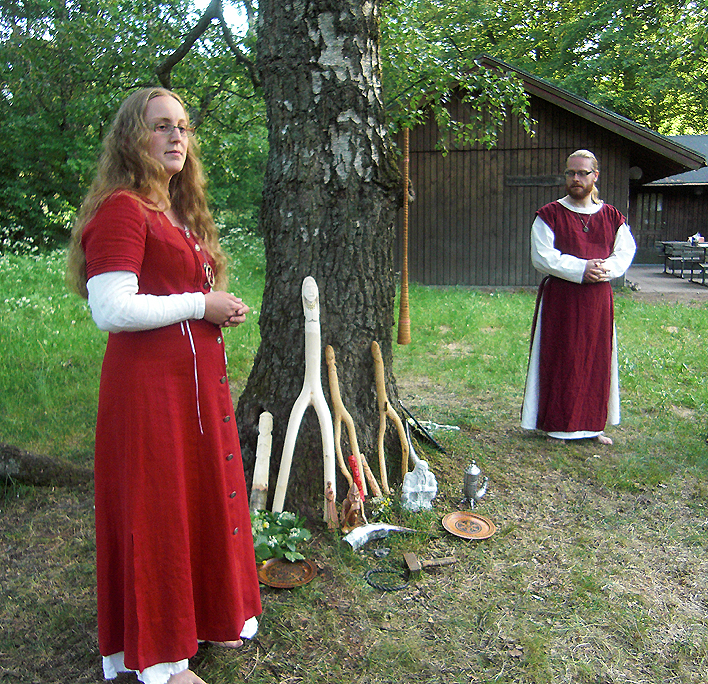
- Council gyðja and goði of the Community of Forn Sed Sweden hallowing the blót at the annual Thing in June 2011. The god-images represent Forseti, Freyja, Freyr, Frigg, and Thor.
- Formation: 1994
- Founded at: Sweden
- Members: 650 (2023)
- Official language: Swedish
- Owner: Sveriges Asatrosamfund (1994–May 15, 2010); Samfundet Forn Sed Sverige (May 15, 2010–present)
- Website: samfundetfornsed.se

The Community of Forn Sed Sweden (Swedish: Samfundet Forn Sed Sverige), formerly the Swedish Asatro Community (Sveriges Asatrosamfund) is a heathen (Germanic neopagan) organization founded in 1994.

== History ==
The Swedish Asatro Community (Swedish: Sveriges Asatrosamfund) was founded in 1994 as an outgrowth of a group that studied Norse history and culture from a non-religious point of view. It became a registered religious organization in Sweden in 2007.

The Swedish Asatro Community became one of the most important heathen organizations in Sweden, and had grown from approximately 150 members in 1996 to approximately 450 when it formed the main subject of Fredrik Skott's study of neo-paganism in Sweden, Asatro i tiden, published in 2000, at which time it was the largest such organization in the country. Skott found that the membership was two-thirds male, mostly in their thirties, and the most active lived in and around Stockholm, but that they represented a cross-section of Swedish society.

In the 2000s, the organization was reduced by disagreements; some of the members who left in 2004 founded Nätverket Forn Sed (literally "The Network Ancient Custom"). But later in the decade it was growing again, along with a general growth of interest in heathenry in Sweden; in 2009 it had about 300 members. At the May 15, 2010 Thing, the organization changed its name to Samfundet Forn Sed Sverige. In 2017, according to a spokesperson, the membership accounted to about 400. It had at that point been surpassed by the Nordic Asa-Community, founded in 2014, making the Community of Forn Sed Sweden the second largest heathen organization in the country.

As of 2023, the official website says that the organization has around 650 members.

== Organization ==
Unlike some other heathen groups in Sweden, the Community of Forn Sed Sweden is conventionally organized. The annual Thing elects the Board, called the Council, as well as making major decisions. The Council includes a council goði and gyðja. The organization divides the country for administrative purposes into three regions or goðorðs, Götaland, Svealand and Norrland, each of which has a goði and a gyðja, and serves as an umbrella organization for local groups.

The Community of Forn Sed Sweden publishes a periodical called Mimers Källa.

== Beliefs and religious activity ==
Members vary in their conception of the gods. Some perform offerings on their own in addition to the organization's collective blóts, which, like those of the Danish Forn Siðr organization and in conformity with Swedish law, are not animal sacrifices as they would historically have been.

The organization held a ceremony at the Kings' Mounds at Gamla Uppsala in 2000 in celebration of the dissolution of the Swedish state church, the first heathen blót at the site in more than 900 years. It has since held open blóts there every spring and is perhaps best known for that.

Goði for Svealand and former Chairman of the Board Henrik Hallgren has represented Ásatrú at the "Spirituality beyond Religions" international conference organized in Jaipur, India, in 2006 by the World Council of Elders of Ancient Traditions and Cultures, presenting a paper entitled "Ecological spirituality and Forn Sed," and in 2010, 2011, and 2012 presented programs on heathenry in the Vid dagens början series of religious and philosophical reflections on Sveriges Radio, provoking criticism from Siewert Öholm that Ásatrú was not worthy of broadcasting.

== Politics and activism ==
The Community of Forn Sed Sweden requires its members to adopt a "non-racist and democratic" stance. Its own statement is that while non-dogmatic, its value system is "based on a humanistic and democratic ethos that recognizes all human beings" and it "stand[s] for religious tolerance and religious freedom in a multicultural society." It set up a níðstǫng on its site against racist and xenophobic misuse of Norse symbols, which has become "something of a marker" for the group. It is also establishing itself as particularly gay-friendly.

== See also ==
- Neopaganism in Scandinavia
