= Monastic Order of Avallon =

Orthodox Christian religious order

- Classification: Celtic Orthodox Church
- Orientation: Orthodox Christian neo-druidism
- Region: France
- Founder: Henri Hillion
- Origin: 1970; France

The Monastic Order of Avallon is an Orthodox Christian religious order founded in France in 1970 by Henri Hillion de Coatmoc'han (1923–1980). Hillion was a former member of Order of St. Columban, which belongs to the Celtic Orthodox Church.

== History ==
In his Abbey of Ker Avalenn, at a place called Les Sept-Saints, near Le Vieux-Marché, Côtes-d'Armor, then in the abbey of Run Meno built by the monks, the Monastic Order of Avallon became, under the leadership of Father Bernard Ghoul, consecrated in 1972, the largest spiritual community of Brittany in the 1970s, alongside the Cistercian abbey of Boquen led by the reformer Father Bernard Besret. The number of followers is over 500. It published Le Journal d'Avallon in the early 1970s.

The growth of the Order, helped by a weak internal discipline, led to the founding of a second community in Montpellier by Paul Fournier of Brescia, but it also led to the dilution of community spirit and monastic way of life. In the 1970s, several splinter groups appeared, including the Brotherhood of Druids of the West and the Celtic missionary companions. In 1976, after the failure of a reform project initiated by Father Bernard, the Abbey of Run Meno was gradually abandoned. The Order continued to exist, outside the monastic context, within the community of Montpellier, but it had disappeared by 1993.

The name of the Monastic Order of Avallon was perpetuated by one of its founders engaged in alternative medicine. Centers Arc-en-Ciel, the Institut Rennais de Gestion de la Santé, and the Institut Européen de Gestion de la Santé all belong to the group.

The Order was listed as a cult in the 1995 report of French Parliamentary Commission and was classified in the category of "neo-pagan" groups.

== Doctrine ==
The Order operates independently of the Celtic Church, but according to its founder monks, the apostolic lineage has nonetheless been granted, as a charismatic individual, by Celtic Bishop Michel Raoult Iltud. The Order has therefore a dual affiliation: Orthodox Christian and neo-druidism. The group says it is neither religious nor ecclesiastical and aims primarily at young people. Its statutes state that the order is "monastical in the etymological meaning of the word which means that everyone must take care of himself". In the order, a member starts as simple monk, then becomes elder, under the leadership of an abbot.

== Judicial cases ==
In the 1990s, institutes affiliated to the Order sued French newspaper Paris Match which in 1994 had published an article entitled "Sectes de la mort: la filière bretonne" in which it was said these institutes were part of Order of the Solar Temple.

In 2005, the founder Jacques Dubreuil was part of a "collective group against the religious intolerance within the judicial system" and filed a complaint to the UN which required the dissolution of anti-cult association UNADFI. On 13 December 2005, the Tribunal de grande instance de Paris issued an unfavorable verdict to the Order.

On 3 April 2007, the Court of Cassation confirmed the decision given on 29 November 2005 by the Court of Appeal of Rennes and dismissed the Order's complaint for defamation against the magazine Un Autre Finistère which, in its edition of October 2000, cited the Order in an article entitled "Sectes en Finistère: ce qui a changé", criticizing its doctrines and methods.
