= Forn Siðr — Ásatrú and Vanatrú Association in Denmark =

Danish religious organization

F.S.A.V.A.D.
- Forn Siðr Ásatrú and Vanatrú Association in Denmark
- Forn Siðr — Asa- og Vanetrosamfundet i Danmark
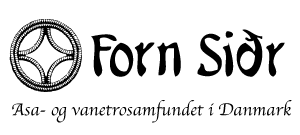
- The logo of the religious community

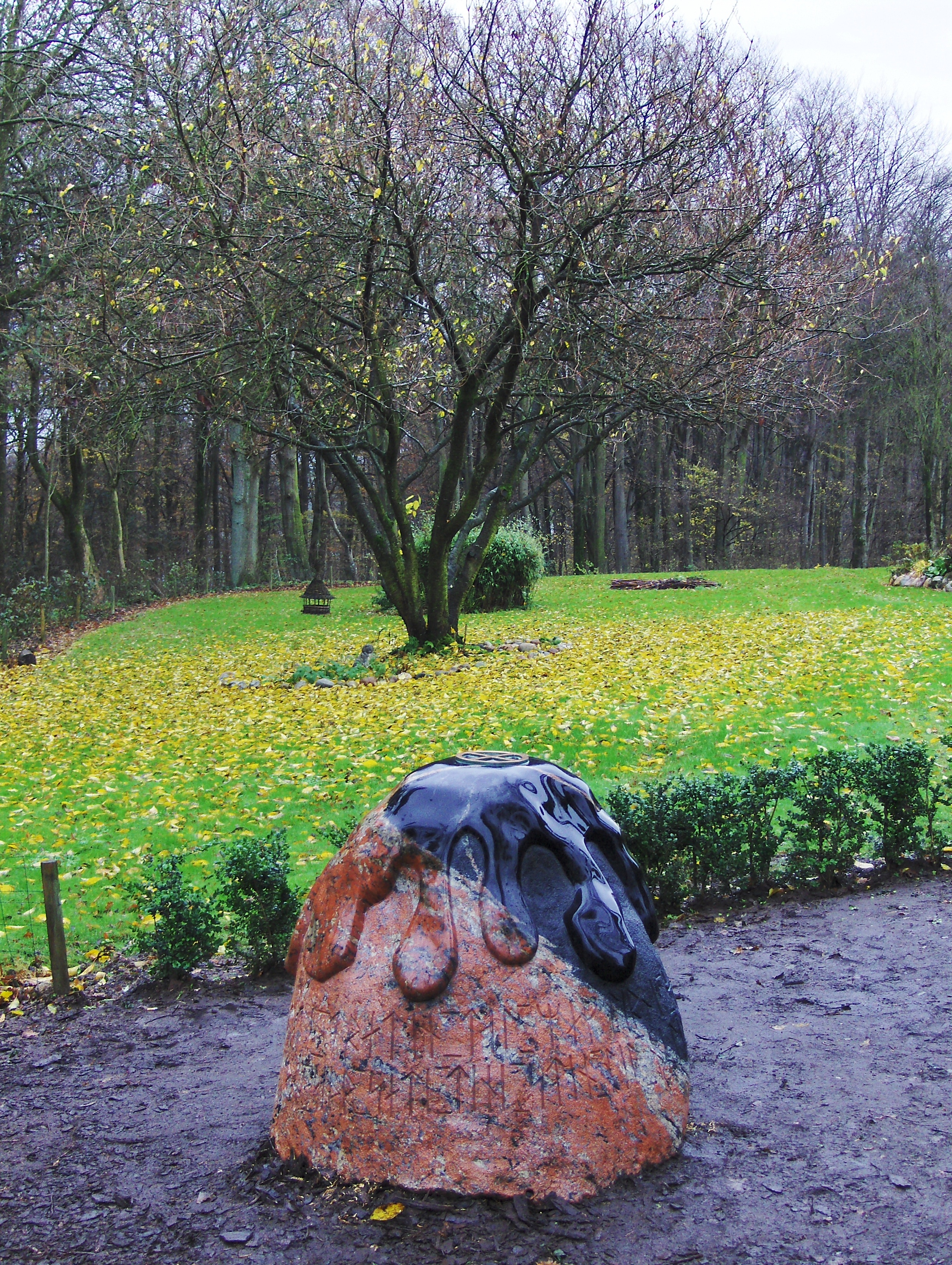
- Runestone at the headquarters of the in F.S.A.V.A.D. Jelling
- Formation: November 15, 1997
- Founded at: Denmark
- Merger of: apolitical, non-proselytistic
- Type: Religious organization
- Official language: Danish
- Website: Forn Sed Denmark

The Forn Siðr — Ásatrú and Vanatrú Association in Denmark (Danish: Forn Siðr — Asa- og Vanetrosamfundet i Danmark) is a Danish nationwide religious organisation of the followers of Forn Siðr (Ásatrú and Vanatrú), the contemporary revival of Norse paganism and culture.

== History ==
The Forn Siðr association was established on 15 November 1997. The organisation is non-proselytistic and apolitical. It was registered as a religious society by the Kirkeministeriet on 6 November 2003. This has, among other things, given the community the right to celebrate legally valid weddings for its members, and better opportunities for members to be buried under the protection of Heathen rites. In 2008, the society acquired a burial place in Odense.

The Forn Siðr association holds official blóts (worship ceremonies) for all its members four to five times a year. These are the four solhøjtidsblót.

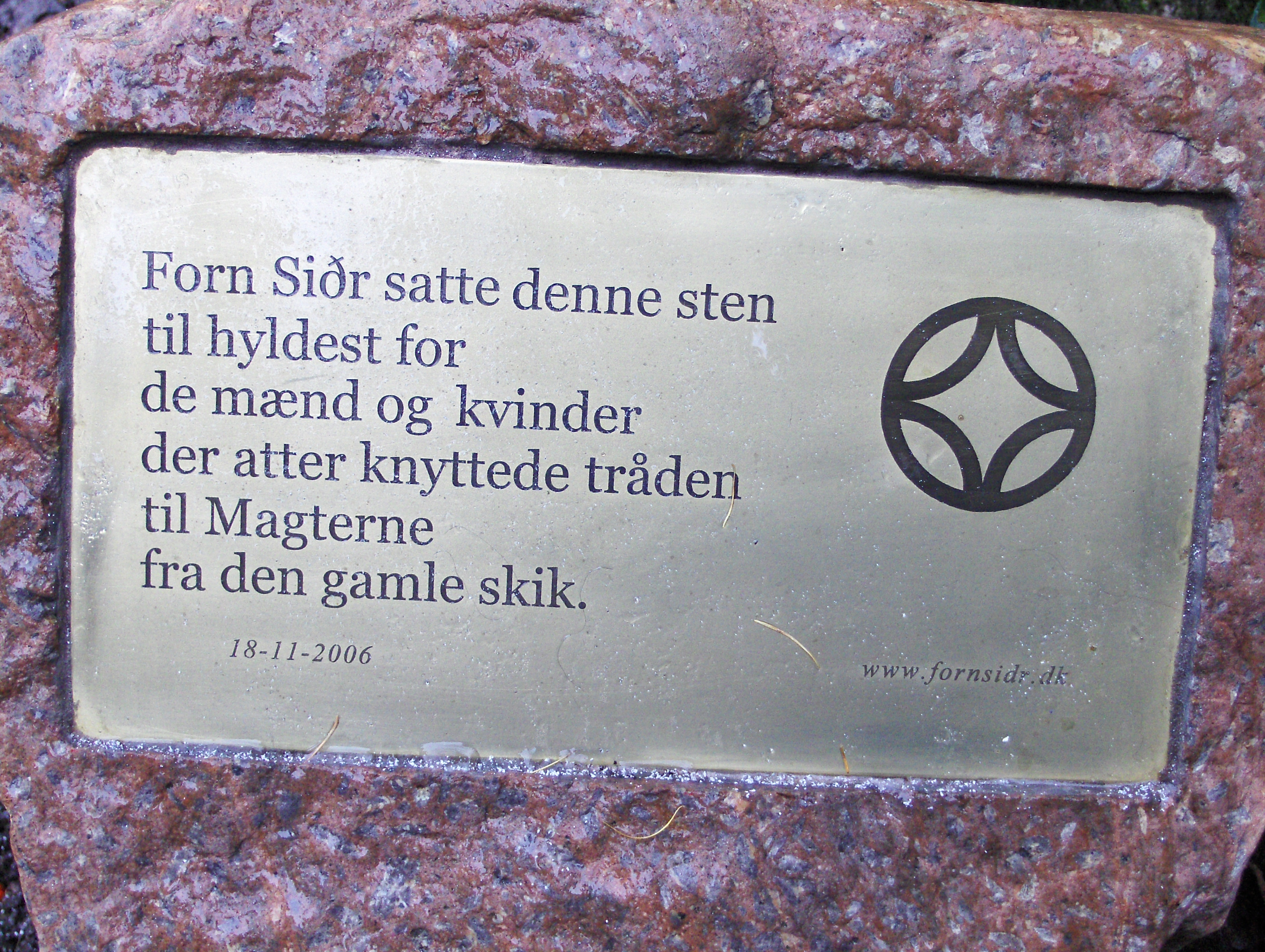
The plaque of the stone.

== See also ==
- Heathenry
- Neopaganism in Scandinavia
- Manheim (hof)
