= Dynion Mwyn =

Welsh religious tradition

The Dynion Mwyn (Welsh: Y Dynion Mwyn, meaning 'The Fair Men') tradition is said by its adherents to be derived from Welsh and Pictish religious sources as well as Druidic and witchcraft magical practices.

Dynion Mwyn documents claim its priesthood evolved from Welsh Druidism, Pictish witchcraft and Etruscan culture, including in its ancestry Druids, Bards, Ovates, "Faerie Doctors", "Cunning Men", "Men in Black", and "Wise Women".

== History ==
Dynion Mwyn church history claims the teachings evolved from an oral Faerie Tradition: "The Children of Dôn chose to stay in Wales after the invasion of the Celts, and took refuge under the hills." The Religious Tradition of Dynion Mwyn was revitalized in the 1950s and 1960s by Taliesin einion Vawr a Dynion Mwyn High Priest, in North Wales. He combined elements of Pictish Witchcraft, Knights Templar philosophy, Druidry teachings, Etruscan religious ritual, NROOGD magical ritual and Kibbo Kift ceremony in his workings. The original Mother Organization, Dynion Mwyn, was said to be created between 1282 and 1525, by descendants of the Bards of Prince Llewellyn, the last true prince of Wales. In the summer of 1965, William William Wheeler III, (an American working in Europe), met his future teacher, Sarah Llewellyn, on the Isle of Majorca, Spain, and an instant spiritual connection began. Robert Graves, who wrote The White Goddess, spent the last year of his life about two miles from their meeting-place.

In 1966, William was initiated by Taliesin einion Vawr into the Welsh Tribe of Dynion Mwyn, "The Gentle Folk", near Betws-y-Coed, in North Wales. He was given the name Rhuddlwm Gawr by the elders of the Dynion Mwyn tradition, and told that he was to return to the United States and begin to teach the Craft of Y Tylwyth Teg (the Clan of "The Fairy Folk"). After returning to the United States, he worked on NASA's Apollo Manned Lunar Project. He began teaching a Witchcraft class in a small Houston bookstore.

In Spring 1967, the Coven of Y Tylwyth Teg of Dynion Mwyn became "The Church of Y Tylwyth Teg in America." Many seekers who were Pagan and seeking an Earth-religion-oriented spiritual philosophy, became interested and joined classes. Lord Rhuddlwm initiated Lady Dana who become the first American Priestess of Dynion Mwyn and Y Tylwyth Teg. Y Tylwyth Teg presented the first pagan Gathering of the Tribes ever recorded and its first Midsummer celebration presided over by Lord Rhuddlwm and Lady Dana. Y Tylwyth Teg established sister covens in Florida, Texas, California and Georgia. The Celtic Church of Dynion Mwyn through the Church of Y Tylwyth Teg founded "The Association of Cymry Wiccae" as an assembly of Welsh Traditional Covens in America. Y Tylwyth Teg then established sister covens in California, Florida, Texas and Georgia.

Dynion Mwyn also established "The Association of Cymry Wiccae" as an assembly of Welsh Traditional Covens in America. Three Welsh Witchcraft covens formed a conclave which was thereafter called "The Grove of The Crystal Dragon." It consists of "The Coven of The Crystal Dragon", "The Coven of Merlin" and "The Coven of Ganymede."

Sharing a common vision of the ancient gods and the survival of the Dynion Mwyn Pagan religion, it was agreed that the Grove was to keep a low profile and operate in secret for as long as possible. So, through the summer and early fall of 1968, the Grove deepened their commitment to the survival of the Dynion Mwyn tradition. The helped establish other pagan groups in the Washington, D.C., and Northeast U.S. In the Fall of 1968 they began sponsoring classes and lectures in Alexandria, Virginia.

In 1969, Dynion Mwyn and Y Tylwyth Teg formed a pagan group known as "The Welsh Family". Since several members were government employees the true purpose of "The Family" was kept a secret. The second annual festival of the Gathering of the Tribes, was held near Cumberland, Maryland.

Membership in "The Welsh Family" reached thirty-two in 1970 and the fourth annual Gathering of the Tribes was held on the eastern shore of Maryland.

In the Fall of 1971, Dynion Mwyn, the Association of Cymry Wiccae and Church of Y Tylwyth Teg, relocated to Georgia and the fifth annual Gathering of the Tribes was celebrated on Land near Kennesaw, Georgia.

In 1972, Dynion Mwyn and Y Tylwyth Teg joined the Pagan Way and begins distributing the rituals. The sixth annual gathering of the Tribes was celebrated on Land near Kennesaw Georgia.

In 1973, Dynion Mwyn and Y Tylwyth Teg received a Group Tax Exempt Status from the U.S. Internal Revenue Service.

In 1974, Dynion Mwyn and the Church of Y Tylwyth Teg joined the Fellowship of Isis of Ireland. They founded the first Pagan Special Interest Group at the University of Georgia. Lady Sirce of Sacramento, California was initiated. Lady Branwen of Augusta, Georgia was initiated. Lady Eilonwy of Florida was initiated, Lady Althaea of Rhode Island was initiated.

In 1975, Rhuddlwm Gawr of Dynion Mwyn and Y Tylwyth Teg founded the Pagan-Occult-Witchcraft SIG of MENSA. Valerie Voigt and others eventually became coordinators for this fine organization. Y Tylwyth Teg began publishing The Sword of Dyrnwyn, a newsletter of Y Tylwyth Teg.

Until October 1975, the Tradition of Dynion Mwyn and the Church had grown very slowly and deliberately. But during the Samhain ritual, one of their elders received a spiritual insight which changed his life and the direction of Dynion Mwyn forever. He saw figures of a Woman and a man merge within an Oak tree. It is explained to him by his spiritual guides and his teacher Sarah, that this meant that his future task was to help relink humanity with Nature. The energy toward manifestation quickened as the number of member covens grew from the original three to twenty-three. Their public relations work on behalf of Paganism began. An accurate and positive article about Paganism accompanied by a full color photo of a High Priest of Dynion Mwyn performing a ritual appeared in the local newspaper. Dynion Mwyn and Y Tylwyth Teg founded the Sword of Dyrnwyn Newsletter and started an information exchange to help Pagans from many traditions and groups connect with each other. The newsletter included articles on Paganism, Witchcraft, Magick, herbs, spiritual healing, metaphysics, and parapsychology. Dynion Mwyn and Y Tylwyth Teg began serving as a resource center for Pagans and Witches.

Between 1975 and the present Dynion Mwyn and Y Tylwyth Teg have: helped with the publicity of the Pan Pagan Festival sponsored by the Midwest Pagan Council, began establishing Camelot-of-the-Wood, an intentional community of members of Dynion Mwyn and Y Tylwyth Teg; received a US IRS Group Tax Exemption was issued to the Church and The Association of Cymry Wicca. This was the first Group Tax Exemption issued to a true Witchcraft church by the U.S. Internal Revenue Service; became legally incorporated by the State of Georgia in Smyrna, Georgia on February 2, 1977; founded Camelot Press and Pagan Grove Press whose purpose is to publish a Newsletter and books on paganism and Witchcraft; co-sponsored the first Gathering of the Tribes held in the North Georgia mountains where Wiccan and earth religion leaders attended from all over the United States; after Dynion Mwyn was contacted by Lady Circe of Toledo, Ohio, Dynion Mwyn helped one of her neophytes, Sintana, become established in Atlanta and gave her a great deal of study material to help her found Ravenwood; Lady Rhea of Louisville Kentucky was initiated; Lady Galadreal of today's Grove of the Unicorn attended her first neophyte class with Lord Rhuddlwm and Lord Mithrandir; Dynion mwyn staff has presented workshops in California, Tennessee, Pennsylvania, Alabama, Virginia, New York, Texas, Iowa, Kansas and many other states; published Paganism's first "Yellow Pages", The Pagan NewAge Occult Directory, containing names and addresses of groups and individuals from many paths, plus a bibliography and other information and was published until 1982; published The Quest, the Way and the Word, a trilogy about Welsh Witchcraft; founded Bangor Institute to provide way for members of the Welsh Witchcraft tradition and others to work toward entering the priesthood and acquire specialized degrees associated with the ancient Bardic traditions; and has done much to further Paganism in the U.S. and the World.

== Gathering of the Tribes ==
Every year, the Celtic Church of Dynion Mwyn holds a national Pagan festival. The first Gathering of the Tribes festival was held in the forests of Maryland, United States in 1967 and was held there until 1970. Since then the Gathering has been held near Atlanta and Athens, Georgia, Unicoi State Park, Helen Georgia, Faerie Glen in South Carolina, Pangea in Georgia, and near Waterloo, Iowa. The Gathering of the Tribes is not affiliated with or associated with any other festival using the name Gathering of the Tribes, whether held in the U.S. or a foreign country.

== Beliefs ==
Dynion Mwyn has a statement of beliefs which is only a small portion of their belief system. Similar beliefs can be found among a number of other pagan religions. Among their beliefs, they believe that every Witch should welcome sincere cooperation with other traditions of the Craft and other religions. They accept several basic principles: (With permission.)

ʶ They believe all of nature is a Sacred manifestation of the Great Spirit, where all things seek balance and are interconnected. The Goddess and God are a personification of this Great Spirit and are incarnate in the soul of each human.

ʶ They believe because there are so many spiritual paths, each person must find their own way, searching for the deity in whatever form it may manifest. We respect all such attempts to find spiritual enlightenment.

ʶ They believe they should respect all life-affirming teachings and traditions, and seek to learn from all and to share their learning within the Grove.

ʶ They believe their God and Goddess is in all things. The Great Spirit shows itself as the female principle of ecstasy, fertility and creation: The Lady (or the Goddess) of Nature and the Earth; and the male principle of procreation: The Lord (or the God) of the Sun and the Hunt (which are only a few of their aspects).

ʶ They believe they should offer love and spiritual dedication to the Divine Earth Goddess and the Celestial God. The confirm a dynamic balance between female and male deities honored and/or invoked at every ceremony and encourage a gender balance within the priest/esshood. They communicate directly with and relate to their God and Goddess and with the Elemental realms on a personal level.

ʶ They believe Magick is a viable tool to bring about change in their lives as well as the things around them, ever remembering the Law of Threefold Return, that whatever is sent forth, returns threefold; therefore they believe in a form of Karmic law which reminds them that their actions affect everything, and retribution comes from the Law of the Gods.

ʶ They believe the Soul is eternal and all the children of the Gods Reincarnate, but the form of the Reincarnation may vary depending upon the spiritual maturity of the individual and whether he or she wishes to follow his or her soul's pathway.

ʶ They believe Nature and Spirit are linked...that without this relationship there is disharmony and imbalance.

ʶ They believe it is necessary to have a respect and love for Nature which is divine in her own right and to accept themselves and all humans as a part of Nature and not as her "rulers."

ʶ They believe they must honor the four sacred elements: Earth, Air, Fire and Water...and believe that no one can own them or use them for their own personal gain.

ʶ They believe every living and non-living thing are a part of the Great Spirit; the animals, humans, forests, mountains, lakes, fields, rocks, and soil. They believe that all living creatures are the children of the God and the Goddess and have a spiritual as well as a physical existence.

ʶ They believe the human body is a beautiful work of nature, therefore, sometimes their rituals and festivals are conducted in a naked and natural state showing respect for and identity with the Earth Mother.

ʶ They believe when a seeker is initiated, the seeker is joined spiritually, mentally and physically with the Dynion Mwyn tradition. Prior to initiation the seeker receives a comprehensive knowledge of Dynion Mwyn heritage, lineage, history, philosophy, and religion.

ʶ They believe it is possible for Initiation to give the seeker a true realization of a Oneness with the God and Goddess, the Lord and Lady. They believe this is Enlightenment and should be the ultimate goal of Initiation as well as the result of your spiritual evolution.

ʶ They believe you should respect Nature, the Gods, the Old Ones, your parents, and your ancestors in the Religion.

ʶ They believe Rituals are a celebration of religion, recognizing the cycles of the Moon and the turning of the seasons. We thus become attuned to Nature, bringing us closer to the natural rhythm of life.

ʶ They believe intelligence gives us a unique responsibility toward our environment. They seek to live in harmony with Nature, in ecological balance offering fulfillment to life and consciousness within an evolutionary concept. They consider ecological awareness and activism to be sacred duties.

ʶ They believe in a depth of power far greater than is apparent to the average person. Because it is far greater than ordinary, it is sometimes called "supernatural," but they see it as a natural potential existing within all people.

ʶ They believe in a Creative Power in the Universe as manifesting through polarity - as masculine and feminine - and that this same creative Power lives in all people, and functions through the interaction of the masculine and feminine. They value neither above the other, knowing each to be supportive of the other. They value sexuality as pleasure, as the symbol and embodiment of Life, and as one of the sources of energies used in Magical practice and religious worship.

ʶ They believe in both the outer worlds and the inner, or psychological worlds - sometimes known as the OtherWorld, Spiritual World, the Collective Unconscious, the Inner Planes, etc. - and they see in the interaction of these two dimensions the basis for paranormal phenomenon and Magical exercises. They neglect neither dimension for the other, seeing both as necessary for their fulfillment.

ʶ They believe that we must honor those who teach, respect those who share their greater knowledge and wisdom, and acknowledge those who have courageously given of themselves in leadership.

ʶ They believe that religion, Magick, and wisdom-in-living are united in the way one views the world and lives within it - a world view and a philosophy of life, which they identify as Witchcraft or the Witches Way.

ʶ They believe that calling oneself "Witch" does not make one a Witch - but neither does heredity itself, or the collecting of titles, degrees, and initiations. A Witch seeks to control the forces within him/herself that makes life possible in order to live wisely and well, without harm to others, and in harmony with Nature.

ʶ They believe Dynion Mwyn philosophy is the affirmation and fulfillment of life, in a continuation of evolution and development of consciousness, that gives meaning to the Universe we know, and to our personal role within it.

ʶ They believe Christianity, and other religious institutions which have claimed to be "the one true right and only way", have sought to deny freedom to others and to suppress other ways of religious practices and belief. They reject this idea and accept that there is no one true way; that each individual must find the way that is right for them.

ʶ They believe as Witches, they are not threatened by debates on the history of the Craft, the origins of various terms, the legitimacy of various aspects of different traditions. They are concerned with the present, and the future.

ʶ They believe there is no "absolute evil," nor do they worship any entity known as "Satan" or "the Devil" as defined by Christian or other tradition. They do not seek power through the suffering of others, nor do they accept the concept that personal benefits can only be derived by denial to another and They believe Witches must work within Nature for that which is contributory to health and well-being.

=== Deities ===
Dynion Mwyn sees the God and Goddess in many different forms. They experience the Goddess in her physical form as the Earth which is the Mother of all. They see the God in his physical form as the Sun which is the Father of all. There are also beliefs in Spiritual Guardians who guard the temples and circles of the religion, as well as its members. The Welsh Pantheon of Dynion Mwyn is listed below with permission:

The Sky Goddess Her name is Arianrhod. She is called the Blue Virgin of the Outer Darkness. She is the whole Universe, created and un-created, before and after. She is the great infinite one who divided herself and brought forth light. Her grain is Oats.

The Corn Maiden Nimue, the Spring Queen. She is the spirit of new growth, of both plants and animals. She is the daughter of the Earth Mother, the spirit of all her children. The Corn Maiden appears as a young girl, her body shining white, holding a silver bow. Her emblem is a six-day-old crescent Moon, which She wears upon her brow. Her grain is Barley.

The Great Mother The great mother goddess is Donn (Danu); she is an embodiment of the forces of the sacred land. This can range from the family to the Solar System or a pattern of stars. She is also called Mari (Mary) and is the spirit of Earth, Sea, and Sky. The world is her body, and through it she manifests. Her grain is all grains.

The Crone Cerridwen or Kerridwen, Ceridwen, Caridwen, (sometimes spelled with two r's), the Mother Goddess of corn, inspiration and keeper of the Cauldron of Knowledge; she is the symbol of the Witch and her name translates as "the Cauldron of Wisdom." She has the power of Magick and prophecy and she helps the seeker to find their own powers through initiation. Her grain is Wheat.

The God of the Blue Stones Danaglas is also called the Serpent in the Well and the Flower King. He is the spirit of Spring, youth, and potency. His seed is the life-giving moisture of rain and rising springs. He also represents the human Divine Spirit, from his quality of pure innocence.

The Harvest Lord Twr (Welsh for tower) is the Corn King. He is the spirit of Summer, a spirit of Light and Heat in its aspect of nourishing and energizing life. He is the son and lover of the Earth Mother. The Harvest Lord appears as a stag-headed man. His body is completely golden: skin, hair, eyes, and horns. His neck is wreathed with a garland of summer flowers and green leaves about the neck. His emblem is a golden sun.

The Winter King Arddu (Old Welsh, "royal darkness") is the Dark Lord and King of the Dead. He is the spirit of winter and death. In Witchcraft, Death is called the Great Teacher, and so the Winter King, as the bringer of death, is the giver of wisdom and knowledge, the Guardian of the Mysteries.

The Horned King Cernunnos, the horned one, the Celtic "Father of Animals" with his companion Stag and Boar is connected with fertility and wealth. Cernunnos is depicted as the "horned god, " with the antlers of a stag, most notably on the famous Gundestrup cauldron discovered in Denmark.

=== Rituals ===
Contains excerpts from: Ritual I, a supplemental reading for Lesson two of "A Course in Welsh Witchcraft" by Taliesin einion Vawr and Rhuddlwm Gawr

Dynion Mwyn Ritual are an important part of religious life of Dynion Mwyn. Ritual connects you with the Gods, the Force in nature, the spiritual worlds, and the turning seasons. Dynion Mwyn rituals may take the form of dance and song which is a celebration of life to give thanks to the gods. This ritual may also take the form of special types of magick which are essential to the celebration of the mysteries of Dynion Mwyn.

Dynion Mwyn Rituals help them connect with the Great Mysteries of existence, but these Mysteries exist whether you perform rituals or not. Keep in mind that rituals exist for the members first, just as a television is a gateway for you to connect with the world --- the world will exist anyway, the news programs shown in your living room will be there whether you turn on the set or not, but the television itself helps you to connect. And likewise, your viewing keeps the shows on the air. But, by yourselves, they do not rely on your individual televisions. So also it is in religion: the gods will still be there, whether you dance in circle or not. The circle is your way to connect with them.

Dynion Mwyn Rituals come in two flavors: public and private. Private rituals are those you do on the individual level --- there can be more people around during them, but each person does their own ritual. Public rituals can involve one person or many. One person may perform a ritual designed to help the entire community, while the community may actually stand outside the Sacred Space of the ritual.

The kinds of Dynion Mwyn rituals are just as varied. There are magical rituals, be they offensive/defensive or propitiatory in nature. There are also non-magical rituals, such as celebrations, beginning or ending rituals (i.e. weddings, funerals and the like), connecting rituals, and so forth. For every important religious event (even the tiniest) there can be a ritual.

=== Enlightenment ===
Dynion Mwyn enlightenment may be expressed in many different thought forms and life styles. Every person can experience personal communication and understanding with the Great Spirit.

=== Spiritual growth ===
The Goddess and the God guide members through many lives in ways that may be mysterious to some who have not been initiated. They appear in many disguises in dreams and visions. They also affect relationships with surroundings. When they are properly recognized, their influence can balance a member who grows healthy, happy and spiritually mature.

=== Reincarnation ===
Dynion Mwyn believes in reincarnation: when a person dies, the souls returns to the womb of the Summerland, what some know as the spirit world or Astral.

Dynion Mwyn or Welsh Faerie Witchcraft has always held beliefs in reincarnation similar to the Druids of Caesars time: There is a strong belief that nature operates in cycles; that life shows patterns of existence, or souls; that these souls do not cease to exist at the death of the physical body.

The Dynion Mwyn belief system teaches that there is a dimension called "Summerlands"; which is a place of rest before the soul is reborn into the physical world.

The Dynion Mwyn belief in reincarnation is similar to the Druid belief confirmed by classical writers such as Posidonius (who is quoted by Diodorus): "Druids believe that the souls of men are immortal, and that after a definite number of years they live a seconed life when the soul passes to another body."

Dynion Mwyn teaches the philosophy of reincarnation and immortality of the soul. In this it is believed that the soul is born into the womb upon earth (Abred), transmigrates, dies, and is reborn into the other world where it will rest until its rebirth into the womb on earth. The ancients mourned at both the birth and death of a family member. At birth they mourned for the death of the soul in the other world which gave life to the new soul on earth. Philostratus of Tyana (170-249 CE) observed correctly that the Celts celebrated birth with mourning for the death in the Otherworld, and regarded death with joy for the birth in the Otherworld. It is believed that the soul is reincarnated into the womb upon earth until it has experienced all that there is to experience in life and then it will go to rest with the creator in the Circle of Gwynfyd. With each incarnation the soul growing more spiritually complete. To experience all that there is to experience in life: this means to have been the abuser and the abused, the murdered and the murderer, the healthy and the sick, to have lived in wealth and then in poverty, etc.

Dynion Mwyn teaches that every aspect of life must have a balancing counterpart. Without both male and female, there could be no procreation for animal or plant alike; without positive and negative polarities, there would be no substance; without light there could only be darkness; on the same token, without evil there would be no good, and so on. This is partially why you are to remain impartial and not to judge those who we do not understand or agree with, due to the fact that everyone has a reason for existence and this includes those who are not socially or morally acceptable.

References to reincarnation can be found in the Welsh Triads which are found in 1) Several sources in private collections. 2) the Myverian Archeology of Wales, by Owen Jones, Edward Williams, and William Owen Pughe, Denbigh Wales, 1870., 3) the Triodd ynnys Prydein, The Welsh Triads, by Rachel Bromwich, University of Wales Press, Cardiff, 1978 4) The Triads of Britain, by Iolio Morganwg, with an Introduction and Glossary by Malcolm Smith, Wildwood House, Ltd., London, 1977; and 5) The Four Ancient Books of Wales, by WF Skene, Edinburgh, Edmundson and Douglas, 2 vol., 1868.

=== Responsibility and karma ===
The Dynion Mwyn believe that we are all personally responsible for all that we do. There is neither original sin nor vicarious atonement as taught by some orthodox religions. Divine law is the law of nature. What appears to be reward and punishment is merely the results of the Law of Cause and Effect, what some people call Karma.

=== Tenets or virtues ===
Dynion Mwyn acknowledges the virtues of different points of view within their religion and encourages an expression of that difference. These are expressed in the twenty three virtues or tenets of Dynion Mwyn as follows:

(1) HONOR - This is the first major tenet. All true seekers have Integrity guided by a high sense of Duty toward the Old Religion - the Old Ways of Dynion Mwyn. They live up to the terms of all commitments and are straightforward in their conduct. All true seekers actively regard the standards of Honesty and be Trustworthy in keeping their word. They refuse to lie, steal or deceive in any way. They are incorruptible and incapable of being false to their responsibility or oath.

(2) LOYALTY - The second major tenet. All true seekers are unswerving in their allegiance, faithful in their Duty and Devotion and committed to the cause and ideal of the religion of Dynion Mwyn and the Old Ways.

(3) SINCERITY - The third major tenet. All true seekers show an absence of deceit and hypocrisy while demonstrating the desire to learn and practice what is right and genuine;

(4) RESPONSIBLE - The fourth major tenet; All true seekers are reliable, answering and being held accountable for their conduct, actions and obligations.

(5) RESPECT - The fifth major tenet. All true seekers show a high regard for others who deserve that regard. But only if the person or group has earned that regard. You can not respect someone if you do not know them. Respect everyone, but watch your pocketbook. Trust is a sub tenet which depends on respect. Rhuddlwm's grandfather said: "Son, in the game of poker, trust everyone but make sure you cut the cards before the deal." In other words, you can only Trust what you can see evidence of.

(6) FAIRNESS - All true seekers behave in an equitable, impartial and unbiased manner, following the pagan standard of behavior which is equal treatment of all concerned.

(7) LOVE - All true seekers display devotion, unselfish loyalty, and benevolent concern for the good of all true seekers. This is a strong affection which arises out of the personal ties between initiates. That is the basis for "perfect love..."

(8) CARING - Seekers show consideration and attention towards other seekers. This comes from concern of others. It reflects a disposition toward doing good in a considerate manner.

(9) ENTHUSIASM - All true seekers are passionately inspired and ardently attached to the cause, beliefs and interests of the Old Religion - the Old Ways.

(10) DILIGENCE - All true seekers persevere in their duty toward the Old Religion - the Old Ways. This is characterized by a steady, earnest and energetic application of their effort which ensures they are successful in their endeavors.

(11) INITIATIVE - All true seekers display energy and aptitude in beginning an enterprise, without major help from others.

(12) TOLERANCE - All true seekers strive to attain a form of wisdom which allows them to refrain from passing judgment on fellow seekers.

(13) COURAGEOUS - All true seekers evidence Bravery, show firmness of their mind and have the mental and moral strength to resist oppression, danger or hardship. All true seekers develop the ability to make a mental determination of danger, and act with bravery thereupon.

(14) CHARITY - All true seekers stress generosity and helpfulness toward the needy and suffering, being merciful in judging others and have an interest in the welfare of other seekers.

(15) HUMILITY - All true seekers are aware of their own shortcomings. This ability comes from inner strength and experience. True seekers are not arrogant, do not have false-pride and egotistic self-interest. True Elders do not let their egos run their lives. If they have to ask for respect or trust, they do not deserve it.

(16) DEVOTION - All true seekers dedicate themselves to the Old Religion - the Old Ways - volunteering their time and effort to its cause and beliefs.

(17) PATIENCE - All true seekers have developed the ability to be calm and composed under conditions of suffering or provocation or while performing a laborious task. They do this without complaint, haste or impetuosity.

(18) KINDNESS - All true seekers have a sincere desire never to hurt another person or thing, being considerate of others' feelings, demonstrating helpfulness, gentleness and sympathy

(19) FORBEARANCE - All true seekers show perseverance and determination with a serenity and control of their mind under provocation.

(20) DISCERNMENT AND DISCRETION - All true seekers have developed the ability to discern character; seeing beneath the surface intellect to determine truth in the face of disguise. All true seekers have developed the ability to make responsible and correct decisions. They have the power to select and distinguish what is true, appropriate and excellent.

(21) EFFICIENCY - All true seekers develop the ability to deal with their environment with a minimal expenditure of time, energy and Earth's resources. This is done with precision, exactness, accuracy and definitiveness. Magick works.

(22) COURTEOUS - All true seekers can be identified by their respect for and consideration of others. They have a generosity of spirit.

(23) WISDOM - All true seekers have the goal of attaining knowledge which has been tested by experience. They have a mental grasp of the nature, significance, facts, information of things, and discernment of their true nature. They have developed the power of comprehension, understanding deeply; exercising sound judgement, and have excellent common sense.

=== Four sacraments ===
In their church documentation they state there are four sacraments: The first sacrament of Initiation joins them to the clan of Dynion Mwyn and with their members everywhere. It is a symbol of a new life and a promise of the love of the Great Spirit, the God and Goddess. It is also a demonstration of their commitment to the church. The second sacrament, The Feast of The Sabbat is a holy meal of cakes and wine that symbolize the fruits of the God and Goddess in the world. By sharing this meal, they give thanks to the Great Spirit through the God and Goddess for their lives and the abundance of Nature. The Feast recalls the unity of all members of Dynion Mwyn with Nature and the Great Spirit. The third sacrament, Expiation is a true sorrow that is shown for doing those things that are known to be wrong and with a sincere desire to change behavior. The final sacrament, Ordination, is a sacrament consecrating a pagan to the service of The Great Spirit. Spiritual power is given to help them devote their lives to the good of the church, teaching, ministering, sacramental and leading a church. Members of Dynion Mwyn are guided by Priests and Priestesses, nurtured by church rituals and the sacraments. Quoted from the Church Constitution with permission by Celtic Church of Dynion Mwyn, Inc.

=== Symbols ===
Dynion Mwyn holds certain religious symbols to be of primary importance. Each God and Goddess is represented by a totem animal which symbolizes the power of the deity in daily life. This relationship between animals and deities, has over the eons, built a complex relationship of religious rituals, energies of the land, and magical practices. This same philosophy is applied to trees, plants, mountains, springs and the weather. Every Land or tribal location has a Sacred Center of Divine Being. Following is a summary of the major Dynion Mwyn religious symbols and totem animals:

The Owl of Wisdom is associated with Blodeuwedd, and is a symbol of wisdom and knowledge.

The Stag is associated with Cernunnos. This is the aspect of the wild hunt in which the spirits of the dead are transported to the underworld. The horns of the stag are symbolic of the Lord of the Animals. Also associated with Merlin.

The Serpent is associated with the God Cernunnos and is found on Torcs, the sacred neck ornament. Some serpent Torcs also have a ram's head which symbolize the power of nature and animals.

The Horse is associated with the Goddesses Epona and Rhiannon. This represents the power and fertility of the horse connected to the Kingship of the clan.

The Bear is associated with the Goddesses Artio and Andarta and the Gods Arthgen (Arthur) and Artogenus. The Bear symbolizes the King's connection to the land as well as the Constellation Arcturus, The Great Bear.

The Bull is associated with the God Esus, trees, and the three Cranes.

The Boar is associated with the Goddess Ceridwen and the God Math. The Pig is thus closely associated with shape shifting transformative powers as well as necromancy and flight. Other important totem animals are:

The Raven is associated with the goddess Morrigna,

Salmon of Knowledge is associated with the Goddess Cerridwen.

The Hare is associated with, and the Goddess Cerridwen.

The Ram is associated with the God Cernunnos.

The Celtic Cross is the equal armed cross in a circle which is the symbol of male and female energies confined only by the boundaries of the Universe associated with the Goddess Donn.

The Winged Ankh represents eternal life and strength of the soul associated with the Goddess Donn

The Pentacle represents spiritual and earthly power; the point of the pentacle is always pointed up, meaning good, never down, which symbolizes evil, associated with the God Amaetheon.

Druid Sigil: The origin of this is unknown, however, it is commonly seen as a leaved wreath with two staves running through it.

Awen: The three rays of light known as, The Awen, form a symbol of the Devine name and concentrate upon the stone of speech as do the rays of the summer solstice and of the spring and autumn equinoxes upon the altar stone at Stonehenge. The Awen symbolizes the source of Light in the cosmos and in man whence come the Druidic virtues of courage, brotherhood/sisterhood, and selfless service.

Torc: This was often a ceremonial neck piece worn by the Druids and often worn by Celtic hierarchy.

Triskell: is considered of British origin, finding its way from Scotland, Wales and Cornwall over to Brittany. The 3 arms are said to represent Earth, Wind, and Fire. It is often said that the triskell represents the three druidic virtues or the three stages of life to the Celts.

=== The Wheel ===
Dynion Mwyn celebrates the Wheel of the Year, starting with Samhain (Nos Calon Gaeaf) as their High Holy Day. It is the beginning of the religious year. Imbolg which is Candlemas or Nos Gwyl Fair, Beltaine which is May Eve or Nos Galon-Mai, and Midsummer which is Gwyl canol Haf, follow.

Worship is centered around four great festivals which record in chronological order the birth, growth, and decline of the fruits of the earth. Additionally, they meet for full moons and on special occasion, the dark of the moon.

These festivals correspond to the cycles of Nature (animal mating, seasons, planting and harvest) and the cycles of the Sun (Solstices and Equinoxes) . These are:

The Four Major Sabbats are:

- Nos Calan Gaeaf (Samhain)
- Nos Gwyl Fair (Imbolg or Candlemas)
- Nos Galan-Mai (Beltaine or May Eve)
- Nos Gwyl Awst (Lammas)

The four lesser Sabbats are

- Gwyl Canol Gaeaf (Winter Solstice or Yule)
- Gwyl Canol Haf (Summer Solstice)
- Gwyl Canol Gwenwynol (Spring Equinox)
- Gwyl Canol Hydref (Fall Equinox)

These comprise a total of eight major festivals. There are also 13 Full Moon Lunar Rituals and several miscellaneous festivals which Dynion Mwyn recognizes.

They believe that if one follows the path of the Gwyddon and offers the sacrifices of love and spiritual dedication to the Divine Earth Goddess and the Celestial God during these Sabbats and festivals, he or she will make evident an inner awareness of their true spiritual nature. Like their earlier Pictish and other Celtic forebears, Welsh Witches have an affinity for patterns in Ritual, Song, Words, and Art, and are an intensely proud and passionate people. The rich Sabbat festivals, customs, artwork and music are indicative of a continuing Celtic heritage, which is best represented by the Triscele, a Celtic version of the Yin Yang symbol. A Triscele is three spiral lines appearing to move in the same direction from a central point, enclosed by a circle. This symbol of three is an important element in the Welsh religious philosophy. Three is the number of the stages of life. The goddess shows three faces: Maid, Mother and Crone. (By permission of Celtic Church of Dynion Mwyn, Inc.)

The primary sources for this entry include: "The Quest", "The Way" and "The Word", books written by Rhuddlwm Gawr; as well as "The Thirteen Mystical Treasures of Welsh Witchcraft", "Mysteries of Welsh Witchcraft: Universal Laws and the Old Religion" and "The Threefold Cauldron of Cerridwen: Mythology of Welsh Witchcraft" by Taliesin einion Vawr edited by Rhuddlwm Gawr.
