= Nordic Asa-Community =

Germanic heathen religious organisation in Sweden

- Nordiska Asa-samfundet
- Abbreviation: NAS
- Formation: 2014
- Dissolved: November 2026
- Type: Religious organisation
- Purpose: Germanic religion
- Headquarters: Finspång, Sweden
- Members: c. 2000 (2024)
- Official language: Swedish
- Chairman: Håkan Ljunggren
- Key people: Thommy Vähäsalo (riksblotsansvarig)
- Website: asa-samfundet.se

The Nordic Asa-Community (Swedish: Nordiska Asa-samfundet; abbreviated NAS) was a Germanic heathen religious organisation founded in Sweden in 2014. By November 2016, it had grown to approximately 550 members, making it the largest heathen organisation in Sweden. The organisation was dissolved in 2026.

== History ==
The Nordic Asa-Community (NAS) was founded in Sweden in 2014. It was officially registered as a religious community in Sweden in February 2016. Its membership grew rapidly, reportedly increasing from 60 to 550 members by November 2016, making it the country's largest heathen organisation at the time. By June 2018, it had approximately 1,100 registered members, and its membership had grown to around 1,500 by 2021 and approximately 2,000 by 2024.

In October 2025, NAS conducted a same-sex marriage ceremony between two men in Stockholm. The decision to perform same-sex marriages caused controversy within the organisation. In November 2025, NAS defended the ceremony, stating that Heathenry was free from dogma and that all believers should feel welcome regardless of sexual orientation. According to Nordfront, the controversy was followed by the dissolution of the organisation's board, and efforts to appoint a replacement were unsuccessful. The resulting organisational difficulties led to the cancellation of its summer gathering in 2026.

In November 2026, after twelve years of activity, the organisation announced its decision to dissolve, citing internal tensions, personal tragedies and health problems within its council. In its dissolution announcement, the organisation stated that its name and remaining funds would be managed by its former national coordinator for blóts, Thommy Vähäsalo, who would also take over the Goderingen and its activities. According to Dagen, Vähäsalo subsequently served as a contact person for matters concerning the former organisation and the continued organisation of religious ceremonies.

== Activity ==
NAS aimed to establish asatro (Old Norse religion) as an officially recognised religion in Sweden, unite Swedish heathens within a single organisation, and reconnect Swedes with their historical and cultural heritage. The organisation declared itself independent of political parties and ideologies and prohibited political symbols at its activities, although its members were free to engage in political activities in their private capacity. This position distinguished NAS from the older Swedish Forn Sed Assembly, which had made public statements opposing xenophobia.

Håkan Ljunggren served as chairman of the organisation, while Thommy Vähäsalo was responsible for its national blót ceremonies (Swedish: riksblotsansvarig). Following the organisation's dissolution in 2026, Vähäsalo became a contact person for matters concerning its former activities and the continued organisation of religious ceremonies.
