= Åsatrufellesskapet Bifrost =

Norwegian neopagan organisation

- Formation: 28 February 1996; 30 years ago
- Type: Religious organisation
- Purpose: Norse neopaganism
- Headquarters: Lysaker, Norway
- Location: Norway
- Members: 457 (2022)
- Høvding (Chieftain): Sunniva Saksvik
- Website: www.bifrost.no

Åsatrufellesskapet Bifrost is a Norse neopagan organisation in Norway. It was founded in 1996 and acts as an umbrella organisation for a number of local groups in Norway.

== History ==
Åsatrufellesskapet Bifrost, originally named Bifrost, has its background in the Oslo-based Norse neopagan group Blindern Åsatrolag (BÅL), founded in 1983 and named after the university district Blindern. BÅL eventually joined forces with the group Draupnir from Våler in Solør to form the umbrella organisation Bifrost, which was officially registered and recognised by the Norwegian government on 28 February 1996. In 1998, a request for a name change to Åsatrufellesskapet Bifrost was initially rejected by the Ministry of Justice. This was attributed to a comment from the scholar Gro Steinsland, who said that modern Norse paganism was "a historical falsification", and would be detrimental to "all serious activities concerning the Viking Age". The parliamentary Ombudsman dismissed the rejection, concluding that Steinsland had failed to give a legitimate reason for the government to not accept a religion.

The original subculture that BÅL emerged from was more generally characterised by an interest in paganism and the occult, and because of this, prominent people from the early days of Åsatrufellesskapet Bifrost had personal connections to movements such as Thelema and LaVeyan Satanism. This heterogeneity resulted in a schism in 1998, when a number of members left and formed Foreningen Forn Sed, later renamed Forn Sed Norge, which is based on "Norwegian folklore". These two umbrella organisations have since held the majority of organised pagans in Norway.

In 2017, Åsatrufellesskapet Bifrost acquired the facility Fagerhøi in Søre Osen in Trysil Municipality. The building had previously been a school and a cultural centre.

== Activities and beliefs ==
Åsatrufellesskapet Bifrost is an umbrella organisation for local groups that perform sacrificial blóts. The groups are called blotslag, from blót and lag which means "small group" or "party". Individual members are also permitted. As of 2022, Bifrost had 457 members and 12 registered blotslag. In 2016, about half of the members were members of a blotslag. The name of the organisation means "The ás-belief fellowship Bifrost". Ás is an Old Norse word for "god" and åsatru is a vernacular Norwegian term for Old Norse religion. Bifrost is the bridge between the realms of men and gods in Norse mythology.

The stated goal is to carry on old customs and traditions and make them meaningful in contemporary life. The members share a religious practice but may vary in their beliefs. Åsatrufellesskapet Bifrost's basic doctrines are summarised in a document titled Eden (lit. 'The Oath'); according to the scholars Geir Uldal and Geir Winje, the "underlying ontology in this text seems close to what we know today about pre-Christian Norse religion". An important source of inspiration for Åsatrufellesskapet Bifrost's Norse paganism has been the Icelandic organisation Ásatrúarfélagið.

The leader of Åsatrufellesskapet Bifrost is called høvding (lit. 'chieftain'). As of 2021, the position was held by Sunniva Saksvik. The organisation publishes the magazine Bifrost Tidende (lit. 'The Bifrost Times'). Åsatrufellesskapet Bifrost use the facility Fagerhøi for a few larger events per year, but also rent it out and aim to host concerts, exhibitions and offer courses in arts and handicrafts.

Several prominent members of Åsatrufellesskapet Bifrost have academic degrees in subjects like history of religion and folklore studies and combine the religious practice with academic studies. The organisation and its members participate in a broader Old Norse-centred cultural environment that involves the reconstruction of Viking ships, the organisation of Viking markets and the production of music inspired by Old Norse poetry and historical instruments. It works actively to ensure that Norse symbols are associated with old customs rather than "hateful ideologies".
