= Samfälligheten för Nordisk Sed =

Swedish modern pagan organisation

The Community for Nordic Custom
- Forn Siðr — Asa- og Vanetrosamfundet i Danmark
- The logo of the religious community.
- Formation: 1997
- Founded at: Sweden
- Type: Religious organization
- Official language: Swedish
- Website: www.nordisksed.se

Samfälligheten för Nordisk Sed (lit. 'The Community for Nordic Custom') is a Swedish modern pagan organisation founded in 1997. It adheres to a version of Nordic neopaganism that emphasises folk beliefs and claims an unbroken continuity through these. The organisation has few members and is closed to outsiders.

== History ==
Begun in 1996 as "a network of independent kindreds", Samfälligheten för Nordisk Sed was formally founded in 1997. In 2000 it was one of the first religious organisations registered as a registrerat trossamfund (lit. 'registered belief community') due to the new Swedish laws. It changed its organisational structure to comply with judicial state demands required for this recognition. According to the scholar Fredrik Gregorius, the organisation seemed to only have a handful of members as of 2016.

== Activities and beliefs ==
Samfälligheten för Nordisk Sed is one of the proponents of the folk belief (Swedish: folktro) approach to Nordic neopaganism, meaning it claims an unbroken continuity through folklore and popular traditions.

The organisation is closed to outsiders and does not collaborate with other religious groups. It does not recognise other modern pagan organisations in Sweden as genuine, and rejects attempts to place it within a larger religious milieu.
