= Forn Sed Norge =

Norwegian Neopagan Organization

Old Ways Norway
- Forn Sed Norge
- Formation: 1998
- Members: 137 (2022)
- Official language: Norwegian
- Website: forn-sed.no

Forn Sed Norge (Old Ways Norway), formerly Foreningen Forn Sed, is a Norwegian heathen religious organization.

== History ==
Foreningen Forn Sed was founded in 1998 as an offshoot of Åsatrufellesskapet Bifrost, because of personal disagreements within the Norse pagan milieu in Norway. It was recognized by the Norwegian government as a religious body in 1999 and a few years later changed its name to Forn Sed Norge.

The organization had approximately 60 members in 2004, 85 in 2014, and 110 in 2017. As of 2022, the organization had 137 registered members.

== Activities and beliefs ==
Forn Sed Norge describes itself as a non-hierarchical religious organization accommodating anyone interested in ancient Norse custom and tradition. It holds an annual planning meeting in addition to blóts several times a year, usually offering mead. A woodland blót at Bærum was shown on television in 2014 as part of pre-Christmas coverage by Are Sende Osen. It publishes a magazine called Ni Heimer. Forn Sed Norge is known to keep a lower public profile than Åsatrufellesskapet Bifrost, but both organizations participate in a broader cultural scene revolving around Old Norse culture, with events such as Viking markets and music inspired by Old Norse poetry.

It is a member of the European Congress of Ethnic Religions.
