= Criticism of modern paganism =

Criticism of the doctrines and practices of modern paganism

Modern paganism, also known as contemporary paganism and neopaganism, is a collective term for new religious movements which are influenced by or derived from the various historical pagan beliefs of pre-modern peoples. Although they share similarities, contemporary pagan religious movements are diverse, and as a result, they do not share a single set of beliefs, practices, or texts.

Due to its diversity, many criticisms of modern paganism are directed towards specific neopagan groups, and as a result, they are not directed towards all neopagan groups. Criticisms of specific neopagan groups range from criticisms of their belief in gender essentialism to criticisms of their belief in racial supremacy to criticisms of the worldly focuses of pagan organizations.

The analysis of Slavic and, in particular, Russian neopaganism from the standpoint of religious studies and ethnopolitics is carried out in the works of the religious scholar Alexei Gaidukov and the historian Victor Schnirelmann.

== Criticism of its historicity ==
Many pagan traditions have been criticized on the basis that they bear little resemblance to the historical practices of which they claim to be revivals.

Gerald Gardner, the founder of Wicca, claimed that it is a continuation of an ancient persecuted Witch cult, a widely discredited notion.

Kemetic Orthodoxy has been criticized for being more based on contemporary revelation than historical continuity. Kemetism as a whole has been criticized over a lack of historical continuity, with most practices having little archaeological support or support from primary sources.

Romuva has been highly praised for maintaining historical continuity by contrast.

Neopagans have been repeatedly criticized for promoting pseudohistory, pseudoscience, pseudoarchaeology, and pseudolinguistics (see for example, The Veles Book).

Certain Russian scholars, such as O. V. Kutarev, believe that "old paganism in its fullness in Europe is essentially unknown, except the beliefs of Mari and Udmurts", and "the restoration of 'pure' paganism as it was in antiquity is impossible".

According to E. L. Moroz, Slavic neopaganism is a religion "in which the names of the ancient Slavic gods are combined with a vulgarized presentation of Hinduism and supplemented by all kinds of revelations about black and light energies and cosmic worlds.

According to Vladimir Borisovich Yashin, neopaganism is not so much an attempt to restore the real traditional pagan religions of the past as it is to establish an occult-esoteric worldview.

Russian archaeologist Leo Klejn, who devoted one of his books to the reconstruction of ancient Slavic paganism, negatively assessed the activities of Rodnovers, who (he asserts) are not really interested in "what their ancient ancestors prayed to and how they got on with their rites, what celebrations they celebrated and what they wore. Their present-day festive and ceremonial actions, devised in the style a la Russe, are a show, a spectacle, a buffoonery. And they themselves are skomorokhi."

The Belarusian publicist, scholar, and former figure of the neopagan movement Alexei Dzermant provided a similar assessment of the Rodnovers' activity:

Their calendar of holidays and pantheon of gods is usually made up of fragments characteristic not of a particular local tradition, but borrowed from various East and West Slavic, Indian, and Scandinavian sources, "cabinet" mythology; Folklore texts are usually ignored; forgeries like the "Veles Book" are worshipped as "holy writs"; traditional rites are replaced by invented rituals; ritualistic "prayers" are sung instead of ritual songs; and folk music is either completely absent or presented in a "balalaika" form, Tasteless stylizations of early medieval and folk attire are understood as "Slavic" clothing; signs and symbols are used in a completely unmotivated manner; texts of "Rodnovers"-ideologists are imbued with profane esotericism, para science, dubious historical "discoveries," and national megalomania.

A different view is presented in the works of the Czech ethnologist, a specialist in the field of Czech ethnography and Rodnovery Jiří Machida. He acknowledged the reality of reconstructions of the Slavic pagan ceremonial complex by Rodnovers. At the same time, he noted that the basis for reconstructing the rites is not historical sources, but folklore and folk worldview.

Victor Schnirelmann distinguished two streams in the world of neopaganism: speculative neopaganism, widespread among the urban intelligentsia, who lost all connection with tradition and genuine popular culture, and the revival of folk religion in the village, where we can often trace a continuous line of continuity coming from the past. In his opinion, "the first certainly prevails among Russians, Ukrainians, Belarusians, Lithuanians, Latvians, and Armenians, where one can safely speak of the 'invention of tradition'". Similarly, Alexei Gaidukov and E. Skachkova distinguished modern paganism as an unbroken tradition, though changing in response to the challenges of our time (with the Mari, Udmurts, Ossetians, etc.), and the new paganism, or neopaganism (with peoples who have historically moved away from the pagan past, including the Slavic neopaganism), a tradition constructed on the basis of the authors' ideas. Historian, religious scholar, and ethnologist A. V. Gurko believed that the concept of "neo-paganism" "can be defined from the term 'paganism,' which refers to heterogeneous polytheistic religions, cults, beliefs, and the definition of new religious movements characterized by syncretism, active use of mass media, communications, apocalypticism, missionary". However, according to M. A. Vasiliev, it is incorrect to apply the term "neo-paganism" (lit. "new paganism") to a movement that has long lost its connection with the traditional culture. In his opinion, it is preferable to call this artificial and eclectic intellectual construct pseudo-paganism, i.e. pseudo-paganism.

Those who oppose the Greek National Religion try to present as arbitrary its identification with the historical ancient Greek religion, arguing that there was no religion in ancient Greece. They argue that what they call ancient Greek religion is a set of beliefs, mythology, ritual practices, and ideological, philosophical, scientific, and political concepts much more diverse and less rigidly structured than any religion in the modern, Abrahamic sense. This whole developed over a period of more than 1500 years, half of it in eras without a script (which would have acted as a stabilizing factor), changed from period to period and from region to region and was subjected to foreign influences. The diversity and lack of coherence, according to them, is largely due to the fact that in Ancient Greece there was never a supreme religious authority imposing an "orthodox" version, nor were there Holy Scriptures with universal acceptance, such as the Old Testament, the New Testament, the Quran, or others.

== Criticism of pagan communities and hierarchies ==
The decentralized nature of many pagan communities has led many to demonstrate traits very different from traditional organized religions. Some scholars have argued that the lack of religious hierarchies leads to an increase in political extremism on both the right and left, or that it leads to members feeling lost and unable to find spiritual guidance.

Many pagans have expressed little interest or even opposition to the development of more robust organizational structures. Many express their paganism as a manifestation of a rejection of organized religion. This is especially true among more progressive pagan groups.

This is not a universal ideal, with many pagans citing disillusionment with Christian theology but a desire for a Christian-like organizational structure. This issue continues to be subject to much debate and self-criticism in pagan circles.

Rodnovery and Kemetic Orthodoxy have been relatively free of this criticism due to their more robust organizational structures.

== Racial issues ==
=== Slavic ===
Some forms of modern Slavic paganism have been assessed as extremist radical-nationalist by researchers.

Victor Schnirelmann considered Russian neopaganism as a branch of Russian nationalism that denies Russian Orthodoxy (Christianity) as an enduring national value and identified two cardinal tasks that Russian neopaganism set itself: saving Russian national culture from the levelling influence of modernization and protecting the natural environment from the impact of modern civilization. Anti-Christian, nationalistic, antisemitic, and racist attitudes of neopagan groups were noted. This aspect of Rodnovery in Russia has been reflected in a number of court decisions: some Rodnovery organizations and writings were included in the Russian Ministry of Justice's List of Extremist Organizations and the Federal List of Extremist Materials, respectively. According to Shnirelman, "Russian neo-paganism is a radical kind of conservative ideology, characterized by outright anti-intellectualism and populism".

Alexei Gaidukov attributes the origins of Slavic neopaganism to the beginning of the twentieth century. According to Gaidukov, the psychological motivation for participation in Rodnovery organizations can be linked to a compensatory function: people often come here who, for various reasons, have not been able to fulfill themselves in other spheres of life.

Gaidukov considers it a mistake to reduce the entire diversity of Rodnovery groups only to nationalism, and that the ecological direction of Rodnovery is no less significant. In the conclusion of his dissertation Gaidukov wrote:

An adequate approach to Slavic neo-paganism can ensure the transition of the bulk of its participants to natural-ecological types of groups, thereby defusing national tensions and freeing up greater forces for potential creation under a new identity.

According to Alexei Gaidukov, Rodnovery is only an attempt to comprehend and recreate historical culture and tradition, which were largely lost by the urban population in the 20th century.

=== Germanic ===
Germanic occultism and neopaganism emerged in the early 20th Century and it became influential, with beliefs such as Ariosophy, gaining adherents inside the far-right Völkisch movement which eventually culminated in Nazism. Post-World War II continuations of similar beliefs have given rise to the Wotansvolk, a white nationalist neopagan movement, in the late 20th Century.

Modern white supremacist and neo-Nazi ideologies, with all of their racist, antisemitic, and anti-LGBTQ beliefs, have either continued to practice, infiltrated, or co-opted many Heathen traditions, such as Ásatrú (sometimes called Odinism). These groups believe that the Norse-Germanic beliefs which they adhere to form the true Caucasian-European ethnic religion.

The question of race represents a major source of division among Heathens, particularly in the United States. Within the Heathen community, one viewpoint is that race is entirely a matter of biological heredity, while the opposing position is that race is a social construct which is rooted in cultural heritage. In U.S. Heathen discourse, these viewpoints are described as the folkish and the universalist positions, respectively. These two factions—which Kaplan termed the "racialist" and "nonracialist" camps—often clash, with Kaplan claiming that a "virtual civil war" existed between them within the American Heathen community. The universalist and folkish divisions have also spread to other countries, although has had less impact in the more ethnically homogenous Iceland. A 2015 survey revealed a greater number of Heathens subscribed to universalist ideas than folkish ones.

Contrasting with this binary division, Gardell divides Heathenry in the United States into three groups according to their stances on race: the "anti-racist" group which denounces any association between the religion and racial identity, the "radical racist" faction which believes that the religion should not be followed by members of other racial groups because racial identity is the natural religion of the Aryan race, and the "ethnic" faction which seeks to carve out a middle-path by acknowledging the religion's roots in Northern Europe and its connection to people who are of Northern European heritage. The religious studies scholar Stefanie von Schnurbein adopted Gardell's tripartite division, although referred to the groups as the "a-racist", "racial-religious", and "ethnicist" factions respectively.

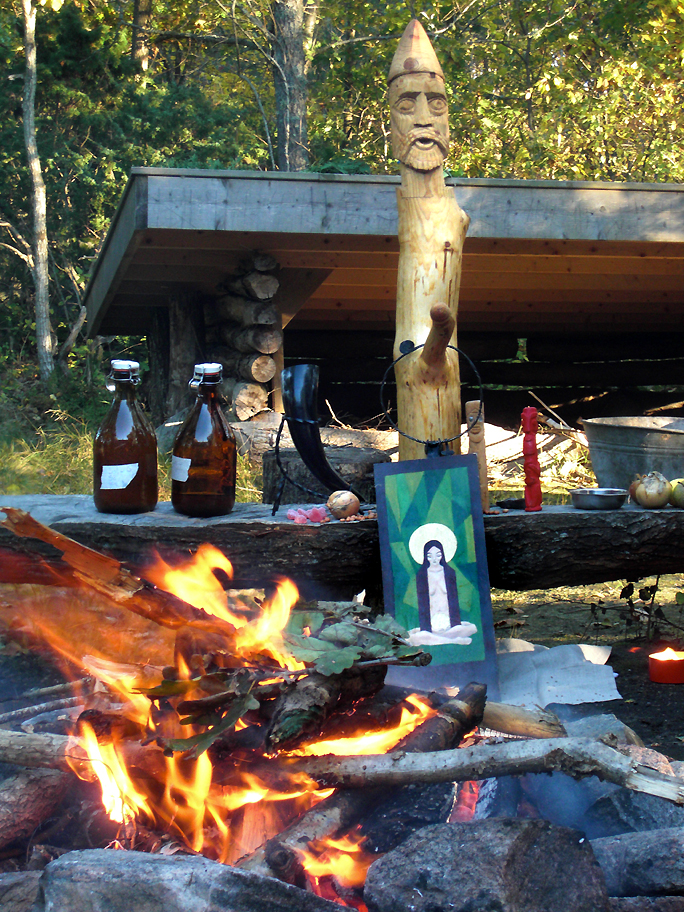
Altar for Haustblót in Bohus-Björkö, Västergötland, Sweden. The big wooden idol represents the god Frey, the smaller one next to it represents Freyja, the picture in front of it Sunna, and the small red idol Thor.

Exponents of the universalist and anti-racist approach believe that the deities of Germanic Europe can call anyone to worship them, regardless of ethnic background. This group rejects the folkish emphasis on race, believing that even if it is unintended, it can lead to the adoption of racist attitudes towards people who are of non-Northern European ancestry. Universalist practitioners such as Stephan Grundy have emphasized the fact that ancient Northern Europeans were known to marry and have children with members of other ethnic groups, and he has also stated that in Norse mythology, the Æsir also did the same thing with Vanir, Jötunn, and humans, thus, he has used such points to criticize the racialist view. Universalists welcome practitioners of Heathenry who are not of Northern European ancestry; for instance, there are Jewish and African American members of the U.S.-based Troth, and many of its white members have spouses who are members of different racial groups. While some Heathens continue to believe that Heathenry is an indigenous religion, proponents of this view have sometimes argued that Heathenry is indigenous to the land of Northern Europe, rather than indigenous to any specific race. Universalist Heathens often express frustration that some journalists depict Heathenry as an intrinsically racist movement, and they use their online presence to stress their opposition to far-right politics.

Folkish practitioners consider Heathenry the indigenous religion of a biologically distinct race, which is conceptualised as being "white", "Nordic", or "Aryan". Some practitioners explain this by asserting that the religion is intrinsically connected to this race's collective unconscious, with prominent American Heathen Stephen McNallen developing this belief into a concept which he termed "metagenetics". McNallen and many others in the "ethnic" faction of Heathenry explicitly state that they are not racists, although Gardell noted that their views would be deemed racist under certain definitions of the word. Gardell considered many "ethnic" Heathens ethnic nationalists, and many folkish practitioners express disapproval of multiculturalism and the mixture of different races in modern Europe, advocating racial separatism. This group's discourse contains much talk of "ancestors" and "homelands", concepts that may be very vaguely defined. Ethno-centrist Heathens are heavily critical of their universalist counterparts, they frequently declare that the latter have been misled by New Age literature and political correctness. Those who have adopted the "ethnic" folkish position have been criticized by members of the universalist and ethno-centrist factions, the former deeming "ethnic" Heathenry a front for racism and the latter deeming its adherents race traitors for their failure to fully embrace white supremacism.

Some folkish Heathens are white supremacists and explicit racists, representing a "radical racist" faction that favours the terms Odinism, Wotanism, and Wodenism. These individuals inhabit "the most distant reaches" of modern paganism, according to Kaplan. The borders between this form of Heathenry and National Socialism (Nazism) are "exceedingly thin", because its adherents pay tribute to Adolf Hitler and Nazi Germany, claim that the white race is facing extinction at the hands of a Jewish world conspiracy, and reject Christianity as a creation of the Jews. Many individuals who were in the inner circle of The Order, a white supremacist militia which was active in the U.S. during the 1980s, called themselves Odinists, and various racist Heathens have espoused the Fourteen Words slogan which was developed by the Order member David Lane. Some white supremacist organisations, such as the Order of Nine Angles and the Black Order, combine elements of Heathenism with elements of Satanism, although other racist Heathens, such as Wotansvolk's Ron McVan, reject the syncretism of these two religions.

== Lack of spirituality ==
Many involved in the New Age have expressed criticism of paganism for emphasizing the material world over the spiritual.

Modern pagans frequently seek to distance themselves from New Age identity and some communities use the term "New Age" as an insult. Their recurring criticism of New Age ethos and practice includes accusations of charging too much money, of thinking in simplistic ways and of engaging in escapism. They reject the common New Age metaphor of a battle between the forces of light and darkness, arguing that darkness represents a necessary part of the natural world which should not be viewed as evil.

New Agers criticise modern pagans for placing too much emphasis on the material world and for lacking a proper spiritual perspective. There has been New Age criticism of how some modern pagans embrace extravagant subcultures, such as adopting dark colour schemes and imagery. People from both movements have accused the other of egocentrism and narcissism.

== LGBT issues ==
=== Gender dualism, essentialism, and sexual orientation ===
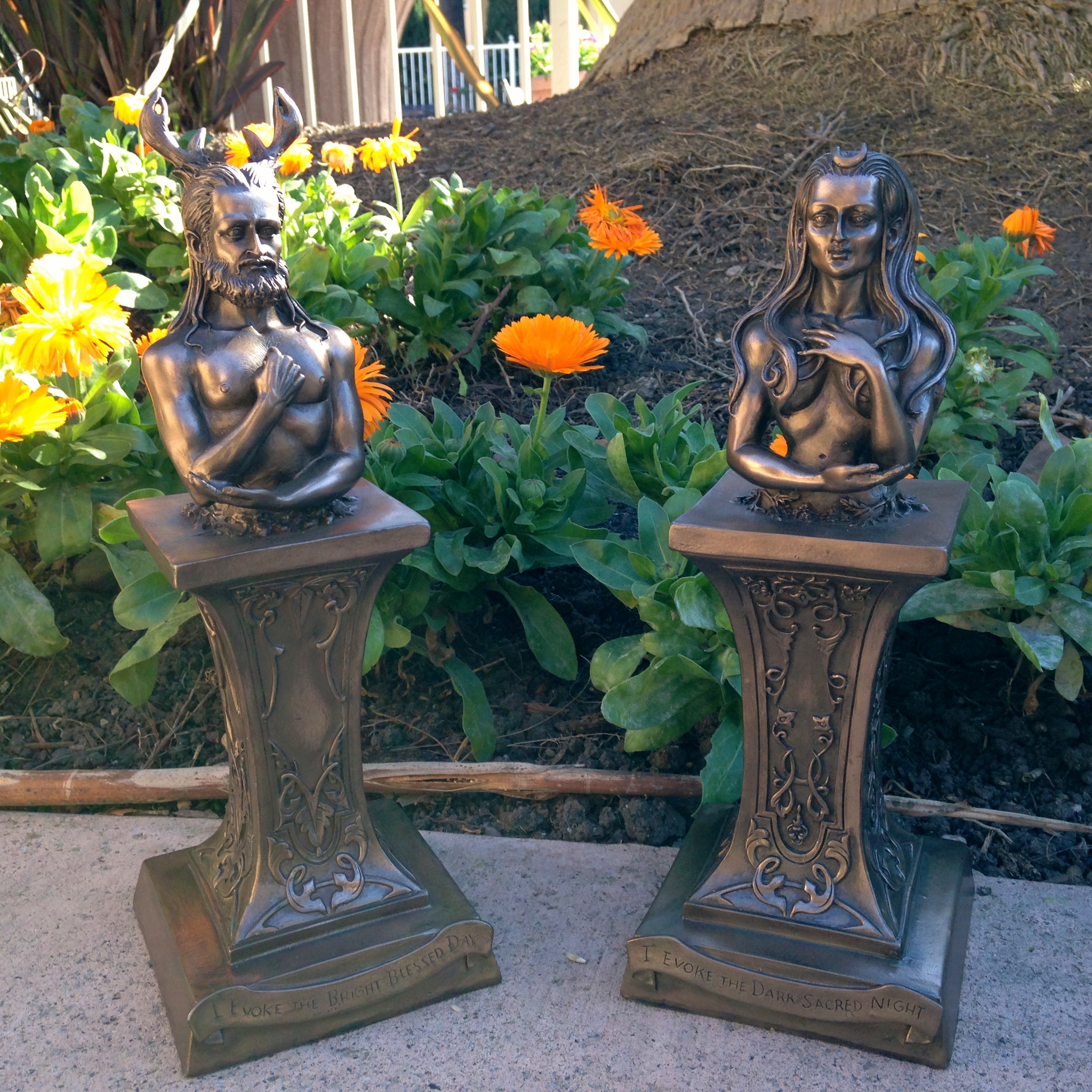
The Triple Goddess (Crone aspect) and Horned God, the classic neopagan duotheistic pairing

Ideological issues that affect LGBTQ perception and interaction within the modern pagan community often stem from a traditionally dualistic cosmology, a view which focuses on two overarching and often oppositional categories. In modern paganism, this is traditionally seen surrounding sexuality, particularly heterosexuality, based on a gender binary which is assigned via genitalia at birth (in other words, gender essentialism.).

Binary gender essentialism is highly present in neopagan communities and their respective theological/philosophical belief systems. Pagan sources themselves, such as the Pagan Federation of the U.K., express views concurring with this academic understanding. The basis of the difference is commonly reflected in discussion about spiritual energy, which is traditionally believed to be intrinsically masculine or feminine in type and inherently possessed by those born into either binary gender.

A preeminent example of this belief is the duotheistic veneration of a God-Goddess pairing, often the Triple Goddess and Horned God, a pairing used by Wiccans. The Goddess (representing the feminine) is traditionally seen as receptive, fertile, nurturing, and passive (cast as the Moon), while the God (representing the masculine) as impregnative, a hunter, and active/aggressive (cast as the Sun). Janet Farrar, a notable Wiccan priestess and author, described this as an adoption of yin and yang in Western pagan practice.

This dual-gender archetype is traditionally regarded in a heterosexual manner, a belief which is reflected in the theology of many neopagan belief systems as well as practices such as magic and spellcraft, which traditional sects require heterosexual-based dynamics to perform. This can be a struggle for LGBTQ pagans who find the exemplified duality not reflective of their own feelings and desires.

The liturgy of the deity pair is often associated in essentialist ways. The Triple Goddess is associated with the reproductive development and cessation of cisgender woman in her three aspects Maiden, Mother, and Crone. Beginning life, the Maiden (young woman) represents virginal preadolescence. Upon menarche, the woman comes of age and transforms into the Mother (adult woman) aspect, now ostensibly capable of reproduction. Upon menopause, the woman loses her reproductive capacity she once carried, transforming into the Crone (mature woman) aspect. The Moon is believed to represent the menstrual cycle and many pagans believe the two are linked. Likewise, The Horned God is associated with the reproductive capability of cisgender men. Phallic symbology, such as the eponymous horns, represent the penis and the associated reproductive function.

In his 1997 manifesto Vargsmål, the Norwegian metal musician and the racial pagan Varg Vikernes, claimed that homosexuality is a type of "spiritual defect" that results from men who are "develop[ing] womanly instincts" and women "who think they are men", and they also claimed that female bisexuality is "natural" provided it does not reject attraction to men. In 2005, Vikernes claimed on his personal website that "you cannot be Pagan and homosexual or even tolerate homosexuality."

=== Recent historical views on sexuality and gender ===
In the mid-20th century dawn of neopaganism, heterosexual dualism was most exemplified in the "Great Rite" of British Traditional Wicca, one of the first notable neopagan ideological groups. In this Rite, a priest and priestess "were cast into rigidly gendered, heteronormative roles" in which the pairing performed a symbolic or literal representation of heterosexual intercourse which was considered vital for venerating supernatural entities and performing magic. It is notable that early neopagan views on sex were radical for their time in their sex positivity and tacit acceptance of BDSM.

Later in the 20th Century, as Wicca spread to North America, it incorporated countercultural, second-wave feminist, and LGBTQ elements. The essentialist rigidity fluctuated under the influence of Carl Jung's notions of anima and animus and non-heterosexual orientations became more acceptable. By the 1980s and 1990s, figures like Vivianne Crowley and Starhawk continued the evolving beliefs. Crowley associated the Jungian binary with classical elements possessed by all—the feminine/anima with water and the masculine/animus with fire. Starhawk, espousing views similar to Crowley in her 1979 edition of her seminal book The Spiral Dance, began calling into question the masculine-feminine divisions entirely by the 1999 edition, and instead focusing on traits instead of gender archetypes.

At the dawn of the 21st century, queer neopagans and their sects began to assert themselves more publicly. These LGBTQ-aligned groups "challenged the gender essentialism remaining in the sexual polarity still practiced" which remained in certain Wicca and feminist neopagan enclaves. Greater exploration and acceptance of queer and transgender figures began not only for adherents but deities and mythological figures as well. In addition, sex positivity and BDSM were brought back into active exploration and acceptance.

=== Gardnerian Wicca ===
Gerald Gardner, the eponymous founder of Gardnerian Wicca, particularly stressed heterosexual approaches to Wicca. This practice may stem from Gardner's text (ostensibly quoting a witch, but perhaps in his own words):

The witches tell me "The law always has been that power must be passed from man to woman or from woman to man, the only exception being when a mother initiates her daughter or a father his son, because they are part of themselves" (the reason is that great love is apt to occur between people who go through the rites together.) They go on to say: "The Templars broke this age-old rule and passed the power from man to man: this led to sin and in doing so it brought about their downfall." ... For this reason, they say, the goddess has strictly forbidden a man to be initiated by or to work with a man, or a woman to be initiated by or to work with a woman, the only exceptions being that a father may initiate his son and a mother her daughter, as said above; and the curse of the goddess may be on any who break this law.

— Gerald Gardner, Witchcraft Today (1954)

Gardner was accused of advocating homophobia by Lois Bourne, one of the high priestesses of the Bricket Wood coven:

Gerald was homophobic. He had a deep hatred and detestation of homosexuality, which he regarded as a disgusting perversion and a flagrant transgression of natural law... "There are no homosexual witches, and it is not possible to be a homosexual and a witch" Gerald almost shouted. No one argued with him.

However, the legitimacy of Gardner's rumored homophobia is disputable because Gardner showed much more evidence of an open and accepting attitude about practices in his writing which would not be characterized by the hatred or phobia which was common in the 1950s:

Also, though the witch ideal is to form perfect couples of people ideally suited to each other, nowadays this is not always possible; the right couples go together and the rest go singly and do as they can. Witchcraft today is largely a case of "make do".

== Criticism by Abrahamic religions ==
In the Islamic World, pagans are not considered people of the book, so they are not protected by Islamic religious law.

Regarding European paganism, in Modern Paganism in World Cultures: Comparative Perspectives Michael F. Strmiska writes that "in Pagan magazines, websites, and Internet discussion venues, Christianity is frequently denounced as an antinatural, antifemale, sexually and culturally repressive, guilt-ridden, and authoritarian religion that has fostered intolerance, hypocrisy, and persecution throughout the world." Furthermore, in the pagan community, the belief that Christianity and paganism are opposing belief systems is common. This animosity is inflamed by historical conflicts between Christian and pre-Christian religions, as well as the perceived ongoing disdain for paganism among Christians. Some pagans have claimed that Christian authorities have never apologized for the religious displacement of Europe's pre-Christian belief systems, particularly following the Roman Catholic Church's apology for past antisemitism in its A Reflection on the Shoah. They also express disapproval of Christianity's continued missionary efforts around the globe at the expense of indigenous and other polytheistic faiths.

Some Christian authors have published books which criticize modern paganism, while other Christian critics have equated paganism with Satanism, which it was often portrayed as such in the mainstream American entertainment industry in the 2000s.

In areas such as the US Bible Belt, where conservative Christian dominance is strong, pagans still experience religious persecution. For instance, Strmiska highlighted instances in both the US and the UK in which school teachers were fired when their employers discovered that they were pagans. Thus, many pagans keep their religion private in order to avoid discrimination and ostracism.

Patriarch of Moscow and All Russia Alexy II at the opening of the Archbishops Council in 2004 called the spread of neopaganism one of the main threats of the 21st century, placing it on a par with terrorism and "other pernicious phenomena of our time". In this regard, Circle of Pagan Tradition sent an open letter to the Holy Synod of the Russian Orthodox Church, which was forwarded on 18 October 2004, to the Department for External Church Relations Moscow Patriarchate. This open letter stated that statements that offend the honor and dignity of modern pagans and violate the laws "On Freedom of Conscience and on Religious Associations" and "On Counteracting Extremist Activity" were inadmissible.

In publications which were written by leaders of the Russian Orthodox Church, the unscientific approach to the reconstruction of ancient Slavic beliefs by adherents of Rodnovery is extensively documented.

At the opening of the XVIII World Russian People's Council in 2014, Patriarch Kirill of Moscow and All Russia noted that on the road to preserving national memory, "unfortunately, quite painful and dangerous phenomena arise. These include attempts to construct pseudo-Russian pagan beliefs. On the one hand, this is an extremely low estimate of the religious choice of the Russian people who have lived for a thousand years in the bosom of the Orthodox Church, as well as of the historical path taken by Orthodox Russia. On the other hand, it is the conviction of one's own personal and narrow-group superiority over one's own people. He saw the roots of this social phenomenon in the "tendency to ignore the importance of the Russian people" and the "revision of Russian history" in the 1990s, as a result of which many compatriots have shaken "faith in their people and in their country." "How torn must the national consciousness have been, in what caves of thought and spirit must it have been, for someone, considering himself the bearer of the Russian national idea, to abandon the saints and heroes of their native history, the deeds of their ancestors, and make Nazis and their henchmen their idols? ".

== Philosophical criticism ==
Beliefs and practices vary widely among pagan groups; however, there are a series of core principles common to most, if not all, forms of modern paganism. The English academic Graham Harvey noted that pagans "rarely indulge in theology".

Neopagan theology has been criticized for its lack of coherence. Proponents often argue that this incoherence is not an issue with the religion as it is more based on Orthopraxy than Orthodoxy.

== Criticism by Russian Scholars ==
Historian Vladimir Borisovich Yashin identifies the following main features of this phenomenon:

- The ancient conceptions of the world, the guardians of which the adherents of neo-paganism proclaim themselves to be, are interpreted by them as a strictly structured system of higher knowledge, surpassing both religious dogmatism and the materialistic limitations of modern science, but at the same time harmoniously synthesizing elements of faith and scientific thinking (which in reality usually turns out to be outright irrationalism and eclecticism).
- Neo-pagan texts and doctrines are distinguished, on the one hand, by their scientific imagery, wide use of notions, ideas and achievements of modern science and technology, and pseudo-rational interpretation of folklore plots and mythologemes. On the other hand, it is argued that mastering the wisdom of the ancestors offers the adherent a superhuman perspective, transforming his nature and transforming him into a human god, and therefore neopaganism is imbued with the spirit of mysticism and magic.
- Accordingly, neo-pagan knowledge is presented by neo-pagans as secret knowledge, oriented toward the chosen, the initiated. They emphasize the direct continuity of neopagan communities (emerging before our eyes) with some deeply concealed, rigidly organized unions of ancient wise men, which did not disappear with Christianization.
- In addition to the symbols and images of the national tradition, the neo-pagans actively use fragments of classical occult-esoteric systems such as Gnosticism, Kabbalah, Theosophy, etc.
- No less actively the neo-pagan revelations include images and motifs of the fantasy genre and the whole gentlemanly set of modern technocratic myth-making (paleocontact, space aliens, flying saucers, etc.).
- Neopagan ideology is internally antinomian: on the one hand, neopaganism tends towards nationalism, the cult of exceptional greatness of its people, while at the same time it asserts the universality of ancient super knowledge and postulates the existence of a certain original "secret doctrine" that forms the basis of all known spiritual teachings. In this connection neo-paganism freely introduces fragments of the most diverse "alien" traditions into its constructions.
- At the same time, neo-paganism openly opposes the historic world religions, although at the same time it adopts much of their dogma, cult practices, etc.
- Neo-paganism represents the most politicized wing of the "new religious movements," and even initially apolitical associations of supporters of the revival of the "glorious past" eventually become used by certain political forces.

== Violent incidents of Rodnovery ==
Some Rodnovery organizations have been declared extremist by Russian courts. Rodnovery followers have committed a number of hate crimes, including armed attacks and terrorist acts mainly against members of Orthodox churches and representatives of non-Slavic nationalities.

- In 2003, the office of the Memorial NGO was attacked by armed men in Saint Petersburg. Two unknown masked persons threatened the employees of the organization with a hammer, tied them up, threw them into a closet, and removed their office equipment worth 125,000 rubles. The prosecutor's office opened a criminal case under article 162 Criminal Code of Russia "Robbery". The chief priest of the association "Skhoron zhizhen" Vladimir Golyakov was detained on this case. In 2004, Golyakov was sentenced to five years of suspended imprisonment for robbery.
- In 2006, Alexandr Koptsev broke into the synagogue on Bolshaya Bronnaya (Moscow) with a knife and wounded Rabbi Yitzhak Kogan and nine congregants. He was detained at the scene by a security guard and worshippers at the synagogue. During the investigation of the case, it was found that Koptsev's desk book was an essay titled "The Blow of the Russian Gods".
- In 2007, a student at a Penza university broke a memorial plaque into pieces with several blows with an axe and damaged a wooden cross at the site of the future construction of the St. Elisabethan spiritual and pastoral center, and resisted law enforcement officers when he tried to arrest them and burned one of them with liquid from a gas canister in the eyes. During the trial, the defendant stated that he committed his unlawful act under the impression of the book "Blow of the Russian Gods".
- In 2008, in Yekaterinburg, a swastika and the inscription: "Russian or Christian. Choose one." The next day the young man threw one Molotov cocktail at the church and another at the parish school, and fled the scene. The wooden church burned down completely.
- In 2008, Rodnovers David Bashelutskov, Stanislav Lukhmyrin, and Yevgenia Zhihareva made a bomb, placing it in a three-liter can with a fuse in the form of a firecracker, and brought it to the Church of Nicholas the Wonderworker in Biryulyovo. Anna Mikhalkina, a 62-year-old priestess of the church, found the smoking bomb and poured water on it, as a result of which only the fuse detonated. Nevertheless, Mikhalkina and parishioner Pavel Bukovsky, who carried the bomb out of the church, were seriously injured: Mikhalkina sustained eye injuries, burns and shrapnel wounds and lost one eye, while Bukovsky suffered a head contusion and a leg wound. The Rodnovers left the bomb in the temple during the evening service when the building was full of people. Experts noted that the amount of explosives would have been enough to completely destroy the wooden building of the church. The attackers were counting on a large number of casualties. Rodnovery members formed an "autonomous fighting group," and before the attack on the church killed more than a dozen people of "non-Slavic" appearance, including a 60-year-old Azerbaijani, and also in 2008 killed a Russian man near the church of Nicholas the Wonderworker in Biryulyovo, mistaking him for an Orthodox priest. Rodnovers considered the mosque on Poklonnaya Hill to be their next target
- In 2009, a wooden church of blessed Kozma Verkhotursky was burned down in Yekaterinburg using a "Molotov cocktail. The arsonists left an inscription on the fence of the temple: "The Warrior of the Rod. Svyatoslav's Men.".
- In 2009 in Vladimir Sergey Khlupin left a letter on the fence of St. Cyril and Methodius Church, threatening to blow up the church if it continued to function. He then committed an act of terror by throwing a homemade bomb through the window. The explosion damaged church utensils, but no one was hurt. The explosion was a warning, with a leaflet that read, "By terror and the destruction of Judeo-Christian shrines, we will put an end to the spread of this contagion." Khlupin intended to kill people if his ultimatum was not carried out, but was detained. During a search he was found to have an arsenal of weapons.
- In 2014, Stepan Komarov, a security company officer and follower of the teachings of Nikolai Levashov, opened fire on parishioners of the Resurrection Cathedral in Yuzhno-Sakhalinsk, wounding six people and killing two – nun Lyudmila (Pryashnikova) and parishioner Vladimir Zaporozhets, who was asking for alms on the porch, who entered the church and tried to stop the criminal.

Rodnovers are also attacked by their ideological opponents, mostly Orthodox, and less frequently by other nationalists. Rodnovers' places of worship are often destroyed, and the police often fail to act.

- In the village of Okunevo of Omsk Oblast, Rodnovers erected a pillar topped with a swastika, which caused concern among local Orthodox priests. In 1993, a church delegation headed by Archbishop Theodosius arrived in Okunevo. Representatives of the delegation replaced a shivaist pillar with a Om sign with a massive Orthodox cross. Later a chapel was built nearby.
- A series of scandals involving the Orthodox community, city authorities, and youth anti-fascist organizations took place in St. Petersburg around the "All-Slavic" sanctuary of Perun there, created under the leadership of Vladimir Golyakov, the high priest of the "Schoron zhozhen" association. In 2007, the shrine was destroyed.
- In 2009, the supreme sorcerer of the Ukrainian association "Rodnoi Fires of the Native Orthodox Faith" Vladimir Kurovsky at the head of his "Polk of Perun" discovered the idol of Perun on Mount Bogit (Ternopil region, not far from the location of the Zbrush Idol). A few days later, the idol was torn down by fighters of Tryzub led by Greek Catholic priests. Several priests were beaten.
- In 2012, four participants were shot and stabbed at a Kupala festival held by Rodnovers in Bitsa Park (Moscow). Vladimir Golyakov, who was present there, was slightly injured. Golyakov blamed the incident on a "foreign yoke" and wrote that it was no accident that it happened during Vladimir Putin's visit to Israel. Lubomir (Dionis Georgis), head of the Commonwealth of Natural Faith "Slavia" wrote that a number of Rodnovers hold the Russian Orthodox Church and the state bodies supporting it responsible for the attack.
- On 17 October 2017, it became known that in the village of Pochinki Nizhny Novgorod Oblast unknown vandals were destroying a neopagan temple. Unknown persons knocked down two idols and ripped animal skulls from trees.
- In 2015, Vladimir Golyakov installed a neopagan idol near an Orthodox church in Kupchina, which was then fallen by unknown persons and then sawed to pieces by the Orthodox political figure Vitaly Milonov. Golyakov set up the pole again.

Historian and religious scholar R. V. Shizhensky believes that Rodnovery is not dangerous and that radical groups should be dealt with by law enforcement agencies.

The Red Ribbon Project of the Traditional Religions Foundation monitors persecution, harassment of Rodnovers, and conflicts. It publishes an annual report on the number of sanctuaries destroyed, negative statements, etc.

The conflict in eastern Ukraine has caused different reactions among Ukrainian Rodnovers. Representatives of the Native Ukrainian National Faith view Russia as the aggressor, while members of other Rodnovery organizations, such as the Pan-Slavic Rodnovery Fire of the Native Orthodox Faith, most often believe that Russians and Ukrainians are brothers and that the conflict is caused by machinations of the United States.

Rodnovers played an important role in the war in Donbas by forming armed units or joining active units. Some, such as the Svarog battalion, fought on the side of the rebels; others, such as the Azov detachment, fought on the side of Ukraine.

The Svarog battalion, an all Rodnover military unit fought in the Donetsk people's republic until its leader was imprisoned by the republic, they had many unique practices such as vegetarianism.

Pro-Russian Slavic military units in Donbass are represented by such formations as the Svarog battalion, "Varyag", The "Rusich" sabotage and assault reconnaissance group (SSRG) in Luhansk People's Republic, the "Ratibor" SSRG also under the "Batman" SSRG, and Rodnovers in the Russian Orthodox Army. Rodnovers are engaged in missionary work in the region and promote the concept of a new Russian world. Pro-Russian Rodnovers often use the eight-branched swastika as a military symbol.

The commander of DSRG Rusich was Alexei Milchakov, a well-known neo-Nazi from St. Petersburg who had repeatedly killed and eaten dogs and called out on social media: "Cut up homeless people, puppies, and children!. According to him, Rusich consists of "nationalist Rodnovers ... volunteers from Russia and Europe" and acts as a "closed collective" and is a unit in which Russian nationalists receive combat training. On the chevrons of "Rusich" fighters there is an eight-pointed "swastika. The emblem of the DSRG "Ratibor" has a swastika and a skull on it. In the Petrovsky district of Donetsk, the Rodnovery community "Kolo Derevo Roda" led by Oleg Orchikov (Volkhov Vargan) organized the "Svarga" people's militia in late February 2014, which grew during the war into the numerous "Svarog battalion, the fourth battalion of the "Oplot" association. Oleg Orchikov (call sign "Vargan") became the battalion commander. He constantly wore an armband of a priest with a swastika pattern and called for creation of "one state from the Pacific Ocean to the Atlantic Ocean". Battalion fighters performed prayers in camouflage and with submachine guns at idols, propagated the idea of "the superiority of the Slavic race" and claimed that their opponents "have not yet reached human level. On 28 October 2014, drunken members of the Svarog battalion beat each other and civilians and opened fire in Donetsk, after which Orchikov was arrested in November and the battalion disbanded. In November 2014, the top of the battalion, led by Orchikov, was sent to prison. Other battalion fighters were integrated into the DNR army. Soon, the Russian volunteer Rodnovers, who had fought in the Luhansk People's Republic as part of the Ghost Battalion and the Batman rapid reaction group, were sent back to their homeland.

== See also ==
- "The Pagan School"

== Bibliography ==
- Adler, Margot (2006) [1979]. Drawing Down the Moon: Witches, Druids, Goddess-Worshipers and Other Pagans in America (revised ed.). London: Penguin. ISBN 978-0-14-303819-1.
- Doyle White, Ethan (2014). "The Goddess Frig: Reassessing an Anglo-Saxon Deity". Preternature: Critical and Historical Studies on the Preternatural. 3 (2): 284–310. doi:10.5325/preternature.3.2.0284. JSTOR 10.5325/preternature.3.2.0284.
- Doyle White, Ethan (2016). "Old Stones, New Rites: Contemporary Pagan Interactions with the Medway Megaliths". Material Religion: The Journal of Objects, Art and Belief. 12 (3): 346–372. doi:10.1080/17432200.2016.1192152. S2CID 218836456.
- Doyle White, Ethan (2017). "Northern Gods for Northern Folk: Racial Identity and Right-wing Ideology among Britain's Folkish Heathens". Journal of Religion in Europe. 10 (3): 241–273. doi:10.1163/18748929-01003001.
- Gardell, Mattias (2003). Gods of the Blood: The Pagan Revival and White Separatism. Durham and London: Duke University Press. ISBN 978-0-8223-3071-4.
- Harvey, Graham (2004). "Pagan Studies or the Study of Paganisms? A Case Study in the Study of Religions". In Blain, Jenny; Ezzy, Douglas; Harvey, Graham (eds.). Researching Paganisms. The Pagan studies series. Walnut Creek, California and Oxford: AltaMira Press. ISBN 978-0-7591-0523-2.
- Harvey, Graham (2007). Listening People, Speaking Earth: Contemporary Paganism (second ed.). London: Hurst & Company. ISBN 978-1-85065-272-4.
- Kaplan, Jeffrey (1996). "The Reconstruction of the Ásatrú and Odinist Traditions". In Lewis, James R. (ed.). Magical Religion and Modern Witchcraft. New York: State University of New York. pp. 193–236. ISBN 978-0-7914-2890-0.
- Kaplan, Jeffrey (1997). Radical Religion in America: Millenarian Movements from the Far Right to the Children of Noah. Syracuse University Press. ISBN 978-0-8156-0396-2.
- Kraemer, Christine Hoff (2012). "Gender and Sexuality in Contemporary Paganism". Religion Compass. 6 (8). Blackwell Publishing, Ltd.: 390–401. doi:10.1111/j.1749-8171.2012.00367.x. Archived from the original on 27 June 2021.
- Neitz, Mary Jo (2000). "Queering the Dragonfest: Changing Sexualities in a Post-Patriarchal Religion". Sociology of Religion. 61 (4): 369–391. doi:10.2307/3712521. JSTOR 3712521. Archived from the original on 27 June 2021.
- Oboler, Regina Smith (5 June 2011). "Negotiating Gender Essentialism in Contemporary Paganism". The Pomegranate: The International Journal of Pagan Studies. 12 (2). Equinox Publishing: 159–184. doi:10.1558/pome.v12i2.159. Archived from the original on 27 June 2021.
- Schnurbein, Stefanie von (2016). Norse Revival: Transformations of Germanic Neopaganism. Leiden: Brill. ISBN 978-1-60846-737-2.
- Strmiska, Michael F. (2000). "Ásatrú in Iceland: The Rebirth of Nordic Paganism". Nova Religio: The Journal of Alternative and Emergent Religions. 4 (1): 106–132. doi:10.1525/nr.2000.4.1.106.
- Strmiska, Michael (2005). Modern Paganism in World Cultures: Comparative Perspectives. Santa Barbara, Dencer, and Oxford: ABC-Clio. ISBN 978-1-85109-608-4.
- Strmiska, Michael F.; Sigurvinsson, Baldur A. (2005). "Asatru: Nordic Paganism in Iceland and America". In Strmiska, Michael F. (ed.). Modern Paganism in World Cultures. Santa Barbara, California: ABC-CLIO. pp. 127–179. ISBN 978-1-85109-608-4.
- York, Michael (1995). The Emerging Network: A Sociology of the New Age and Neo-pagan Movements. Lanham, Maryland: Rowman & Littlefield. ISBN 0-8476-8000-2.
