= Orthodoxy =

Adherence to the actual accepted belief, especially in religion

Orthodoxy (from Ancient Greek ὀρθοδοξία (orthodoxía) 'righteous/correct opinion') is adherence to a purported "correct" or otherwise mainstream- or classically accepted creed, especially in religion.

Orthodoxy within Christianity can refer to acceptance of the doctrines defined by various creeds and ecumenical councils in antiquity, though different Churches accept the creeds and councils to varying degrees. Such differences of opinion have developed for numerous reasons, including language and cultural barriers. Eastern Orthodoxy and Oriental Orthodoxy, two of the ancient branches of Christianity, are also sometimes referred to simply as "Orthodoxy".

In some English-speaking countries, Jews who adhere to all the contemporarily applicable commandments legislated in the Written and Oral Torah are often called Orthodox Jews. As this can include many Jews that may not necessarily identify with the term "Orthodox", such as many Masorti Jews, Jewish communities that consider themselves Orthodox are normally united through a diverse, but shared Hashkafic origin from the period of 1818-1821.

Sunni Islam is sometimes referred to as "Orthodox Islam".

== Religions ==
=== Buddhism ===
The historical Buddha was known to denounce mere attachment to scriptures or dogmatic principles, as it was mentioned in the Kalama Sutta. Moreover, the Theravada school of Buddhism follows strict adherence to the Pāli Canon (tripiṭaka) and the commentaries such as the Visuddhimagga. Hence, the Theravada school came to be considered the most orthodox of all Buddhist schools, as it is known to be highly conservative, especially within the discipline and practice of the Vinaya.

=== Christianity ===
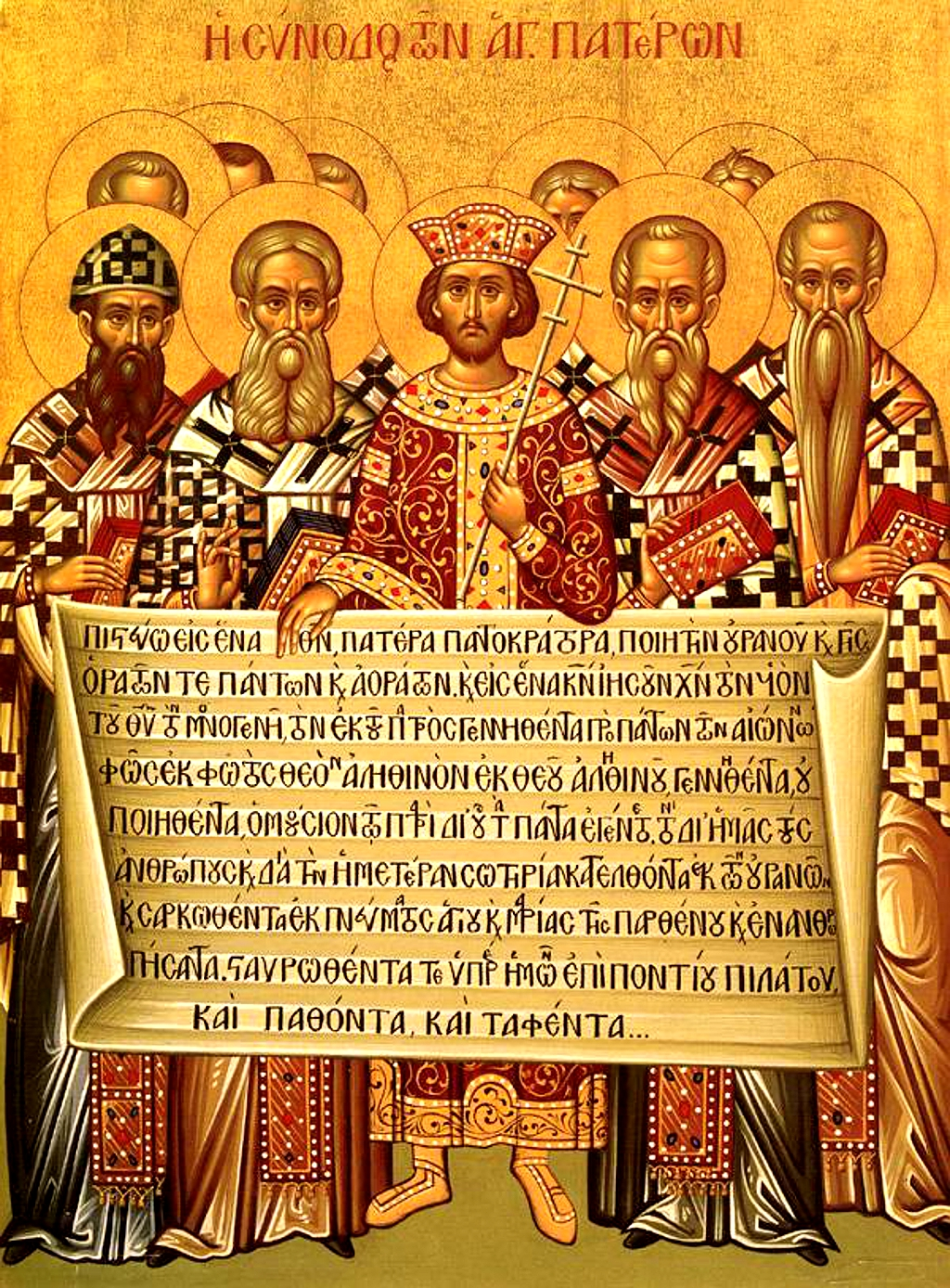
Adherence to the Nicene Creed is a common test of orthodoxy in Christianity.

In classical Christian use, the term orthodox refers to the set of doctrines which were believed by the early Christians. A series of ecumenical councils were held over several centuries to formalize these doctrines. The most significant of these early decisions was that between the homoousian doctrine of Athanasius of Alexandria and Eustathius of Antioch—which became trinitarianism—and the heteroousian doctrine of Arius and Eusebius of Nicomedia, which would go on to be termed Arianism. The homoousian doctrine, which defined Jesus as both God and man—a Christological doctrine known as miaphysitism with the canons of the 431 Council of Ephesus, won out in the Church and was referred to as orthodoxy in most Christian contexts, since this was the viewpoint of previous Christian Church Fathers and was reaffirmed at these councils. (The minority of nontrinitarian Christians object to some if not all of this trinitarian-based terminology.)

Following the 1054 Great Schism, both the Western Catholic Church and the Eastern Orthodox Church continued to consider themselves uniquely orthodox and catholic. Augustine of Hippo (354–430 CE) wrote in On True Religion: "Religion is to be sought…only among those who are called Catholic or orthodox Christians, that is, guardians of truth and followers of right." Over time, the Western Church gradually identified with the "Catholic" label, and people of Western Europe gradually associated the "Orthodox" label with the Eastern Church. (In some languages, the "Catholic" label is not necessarily identified with the Western Church.) This was in light of the fact that both "Catholic" and "Orthodox" were in use as ecclesiastical adjectives as early as the 2nd and 4th centuries, respectively.

Much earlier, the earliest Oriental Orthodox Churches and Chalcedonian Christianity separated into two after the Council of Chalcedon (451 CE), because of several Christological differences. Since then, Oriental Orthodox Churches have maintained the orthodox designation as a symbol of their theological traditions.

Lutheran orthodoxy was an era in the history of Lutheranism that began with the 1580 publication of the Book of Concord and ended with the onset of the Age of Enlightenment. Lutheran orthodoxy was paralleled by similar eras in Calvinism and Tridentine Roman Catholicism after the Counter-Reformation. Lutheran scholasticism was a theological method that gradually developed during the era of Lutheran orthodoxy. Theologians used the neo-Aristotelian form of presentation, already popular in academia, in their writings and lectures. They defined the Lutheran faith and defended it against the polemics of opposing parties. Reformed orthodoxy, or Calvinist orthodoxy, was an era in the history of Calvinism spanning the 16th to 18th centuries. Calvinist orthodoxy was paralleled by similar eras in Lutheranism and Tridentine Roman Catholicism after the Counter-Reformation. Calvinist scholasticism, also known as Reformed scholasticism, was a theological method that gradually developed during the era of Calvinist orthodoxy.

=== Hinduism ===
Orthodoxy does not exist in Hinduism, as the word Hindu itself collectively refers to the various beliefs of people who lived beyond the Sindhu River (also known as the Indus River) in India. It is a record of the accepted teachings of each of thousands of gurus, who others equate to prophets, and has no founder, no authority or command, but recommendations. The term most equivalent to orthodoxy at best has the meaning of "commonly accepted" traditions rather than the usual meaning of "conforming to a doctrine"; for example, what people of some Abrahamic faiths attempt to equate as doctrine in Hindu philosophies is Sanatana Dharma, but which at best can be translated to mean "ageless traditions", hence denoting that they are accepted not through doctrine and force but through multi-generational tests of adoption and retention based on circumstantial attrition through millennia. Still, the concepts of āstika and nāstika of Indian philosophy are quite similar to orthodoxy and heterodoxy, respectively, the ātiska being those who accept the epistemic authority of the Vedas.

=== Islam ===
Sunni Islam is sometimes referred to as "Orthodox Islam", although some scholars of Islam, such as John Burton, believe that there is no such thing as "Orthodox Islam".

=== Judaism ===
Orthodox Judaism is a form of Judaism that seeks to maintain the continuity of traditional Jewish belief and practice, rooted in the Tanakh (Hebrew Bible) and the Oral Torah (Hebrew: תּוֹרָה שֶׁבְּעַל־פֶּה, romanized: Torah sheh-bei'ahl peh), and interpreted through Jewish law (הֲלָכָה, Halakhá, 'the [way of] walking') as transmitted by rabbinic authority, while also shaped in practice by diverse minhagim (מִנְהָגִים, 'customs'). More specifically, the term "Orthodox" is used to describe those communities whose hashkafa (הַשׁקָפָה, 'outlook' or 'worldview') are correlative—not necessarily identical or in agreement—yet originating from a 19th-century reaction to the challenges of modernity and secularization that arose during the Haskalah (הַשׂכָּלָה, 'wisdom' or 'education'), the so-called Jewish Enlightenment. In essence, Orthodox Judaism developed as a reconciliatory reaction of the historically cobelligerent Hasidic Jewish community and non-Hasidic Misnagdim (מִתְנַגְּדִים, 'Opponents [of Hasidic Judaism]') to the genesis of Reform Judaism precipitated by the Haskalah.

Theologically, it is chiefly defined by regarding the Torah, both Written and Oral, as being literally revealed by God to Moses on the biblical Mount Sinai and faithfully transmitted without alteration ever since. The movement advocates a strict observance of halakha (Jewish Law), which is to be interpreted only according to received methods due to its divine character. Orthodoxy considers "halakha" as eternal – unchanged, unchanging, and unchangeable – being applied differently to changing circumstances but essentially static in its nature. This viewpoint differs even from the opinions of other Traditionalist Jewish approaches, whose adherents – to varying degrees – may disagree on the existence of a separation between halakha and how it is interpreted and practiced, and/or acknowledge that halakha has shifted in some way, such as between the Pre-Temple Era, First and Second Temple Era, and the Post-Temple Era.

Orthodox Judaism is not a centralized denomination. Relations between its different subgroups are sometimes strained, and at times in history openinly bellicose and violent amongst one another. Accordingly, the exact limits of Orthodoxy are subject to intense debate, and the labels used to describe groups that consider themselves to be Orthodox have and continue to shift. A major example is the development of Open Orthodoxy in response to Modern Orthodoxy's "sliding to the right" from the latter 20th-century and onwards, and the Orthodox Union's the latter's adoption of the term "Centrist Orthodoxy". Very roughly, Orthodox Judaism can be divided between Haredi Judaism, which is more conservative and insular, and Modern Orthodox Judaism, which is relatively open to the outside world and tends to engage in political activism, especially concerning Israel advocacy. It is to such a degree that within Israel itself, Modern Orthodoxy is known as Religious Zionism, fusing religious practice with political philosophy. This is one of the factors which lead to Rabbi Avi Weiss' ignition of the Open Orthodoxy movement, which nominally seeks to preserve the critical ambivalence, and even opposition, of Diaspora Orthodoxy towards Zionism. Haredi Judaism is also composed of multiple independent streams, some of which may be Hasidic or Mitnadic (Yeshivish / Litvish) Haredim and the Modern Orthodox are almost uniformly exclusionist, regarding their Orthodoxies as the only authentic form of Judaism and rejecting all non-Orthodox interpretations as illegitimate. This includes most non-Orthodox conversions, which has complicated Israel's Law of Return due to the political dominance of the Orthodox Chief Rabbinate over many parts of Israeli civics, such as marriage, and contentiously considering some non-Orthodox converts, and even some Orthodox conversions done outside of Israel as being not Jewish.

=== Others ===
Epicureanism is an orthodox secular philosophical belief based on the correct pursuit of pleasure and a natural rather than supernatural worldview. It has forty Principal Doctrines, and Vatican Saying 41 mentions ὀρθῆς φιλοσοφίας φωνὰς ἀφιέντας ("orthes philosophias phonas aphientas", which translates as "(never cease to) utter the sayings of correct philosophy").

Kemetic Orthodoxy is a denomination of Kemetism, a reform reconstruction of Egyptian polytheism for modern followers. It claims to derive a spiritual lineage from the Ancient Egyptian religion. There are organizations of Slavic Native Faith (Rodnovery) which characterize the religion as Orthodoxy and by other terms.

== Non-religious contexts ==
Outside the context of religion, the term orthodoxy is often used to refer to any commonly held belief or set of beliefs in some field, in particular, when these tenets – possibly referred to as "dogmas" – are being challenged. In this sense, the term "orthodox" can have a mildly pejorative connotation. Among various "orthodoxies" in distinctive fields, the most commonly used terms include:

- Political orthodoxy
  - Orthodox Marxism
- Social orthodoxy
- Economic orthodoxy
- Scientific orthodoxy
- Artistic orthodoxy
- Orthodox medicine

=== Broader meaning ===
The terms orthodox and orthodoxy are also used more broadly by English-speakers to refer to things other than ideas and beliefs. A new and unusual way of solving a problem could be referred to as unorthodox, while a common and 'normal' mainstream way of solving a problem might be referred to as orthodox.

== Development ==
The concept of orthodoxy pre-supposes some degree of agreed cultural standardisation – a system of social norms – whereby opinion can distinguish "correct" belief or doctrine from their "incorrect" equivalents. Where world-views or religious sentiment have not developed standardised, generally accepted systems of thought, orthodoxy cannot take root. The development of writing facilitated the gradual canonisation of written scriptures and supra-national philosophies in the increasingly monotheistic Abrahamic Near East, but literacy traditions in South Asia and in East Asia did not prevent the growth of religious and political pluralism.

While in Christian late antiquity orthodoxy was negotiated mostly through theological dispute, public participation remained a key factor. Therefore, while there was an element of top-down dynamic in the development of orthodox beliefs, they remained influenced by convictions and social dynamics of the broader populace. Medieval Europe and the post-colonial West saw a turn – subsequently spreading elsewhere – to coercive interest in the belief-systems of the individual (McCarthyism exemplifies a peak in this trend) and in their regulation or "correction" via social control – in the interests of ideological purity and state homogeneity.

== Related concepts ==
Orthodoxy is opposed to heterodoxy ('other teaching') or heresy. People who deviate from orthodoxy by professing a doctrine considered to be false are called heretics, while those who, perhaps without professing heretical beliefs, break from the perceived main body of believers are called schismatics. The term employed sometimes depends on the aspect most in view: if one is addressing corporate unity, the emphasis may be on schism; if one is addressing doctrinal coherence, the emphasis may be on heresy. A deviation lighter than heresy is commonly called error, in the sense of not being grave enough to cause total estrangement, while yet seriously affecting communion. Sometimes error is also used to cover both full heresies and minor errors. Doctrine or practices not regarded as essential to faith, with which Christians can legitimately disagree, are known as adiaphora.

The concept of orthodoxy is prevalent in many forms of organized monotheism. However, orthodox belief is not usually overly emphasized in polytheistic or animist religions, in which there is often little or no concept of dogma, and varied interpretations of doctrine and theology are tolerated and sometimes even encouraged within certain contexts. Syncretism, for example, plays a much wider role in non-monotheistic (and particularly, non-scriptural) religion. The prevailing governing norm within polytheism is often orthopraxy ('right practice') rather than the "right belief" of orthodoxy.

== See also ==
- Catholicism
- Chalcedonian Definition
- Eastern Catholic Churches
- Eastern Christianity
- Four Marks of the Church
- Heresy in Christianity
- History of Oriental Orthodoxy
- History of the Eastern Orthodox Church
- Lutheran orthodoxy
- Neo-orthodoxy
- Nicene Christianity
- Non-Chalcedonian Christianity
- Orthodoxy (book)
- Paleo-orthodoxy
- Patristics
- Proto-orthodox Christianity
- Radical orthodoxy
- Rule of Faith
