= Alexei Gaidukov =

Russian Scholar of New Religions

Alexey Viktorovich Gaidukov (Russian: Алексeй Викторович Гайдуков; born 15 June 1974) is a Russian religious scholar, specialist in new religious movements (especially Modern Paganism). He is the son of the surgeon Viktor Gaidukov.

Gaidukov was born in Leningrad, in the Soviet Union. In 1991 he graduated from secondary school No. 248 in Leningrad. In 1996 he graduated from the Faculty of Social Sciences Herzen University and, in 1999, a full-time Ph.D. program in the Department of Religious Studies there. In 2000 in the Herzen University under professor Nikolai Gordienko he defended his PhD thesis on "The Ideology and Practice of Slavic Neo-Paganism" (specialty 09.00.06 - philosophy of religion) against professor Alexander Zamaleev, and Associate Professor N. V. Nosovich, for the Museum of the History of Religion.

In 1995–2001, Gaidukov was a teacher of history, law, and social studies at secondary school No. 551 in St. Petersburg. In 2001-2015 - Senior Lecturer (since 2001) and Associate Professor (since 2004) of the Department of Religious Studies, and since 2015 - Associate Professor of the Department of Sociology and Religious Studies, since 1 September 2018 - Associate Professor of the Department of History of Religions and Theology. Herzen University. Since 2003 - curator of the student scientific society of the department. In 2003–2013, he was an associate professor at the Baltic Academy of Tourism and Entrepreneurship. In 2004–2009, he was an associate professor at the Interregional Institute of Economics and Law at the Interparliamentary Assembly Eurasian Economic Community.

Since 2012, Gaidukov has been the head of the Etna Center for Religious Studies. Since 1997, he has been a member of the Scientific and Methodological Council for Religious Studies of the society "Knowledge" of St. Petersburg and the Leningrad Region"» and since 2002 - a member of the society "Knowledge" of St. Petersburg and the Leningrad Region"». Since 2007, he has been a member of the Russian Association of Researchers of Religion (Российское объединение исследователей религии). Since 2018, he has been a member of the Russian Religious Society (Русское религиоведческое общество).

== See also ==
- Criticism of modern paganism
