= Ancient Egyptian offerings =

Religious ritual in ancient Egypt

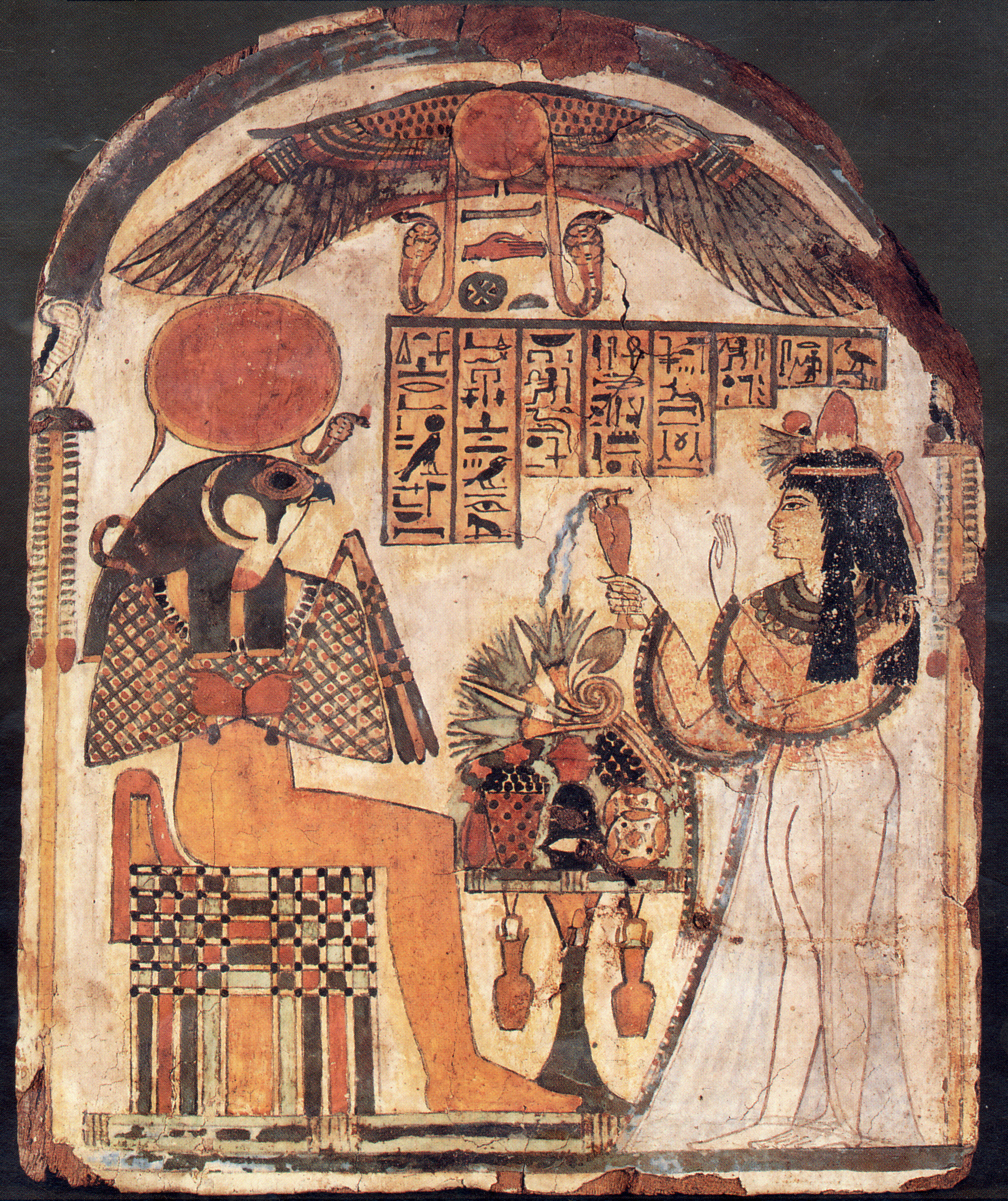
Ancient Egyptian wooden stela depicting Lady Djedkhonsuiwesankh giving offerings of food, drink, and flowers to Re-Horakhty

The ancient Egyptians performed rituals focussed on making offerings of food, drink, clothing and ointment, to a deity. Offerings commonly took place in temples everyday by groups of priests acting on behalf of the Pharaoh. Offerings were provided to the gods to gain their favor. These offerings would feature incense to be burned. It was mandatory for the offering of food or beverage to be consumed by the offeror during the offering.

== Temple ==
The most common temple ritual was the morning offering ceremony, performed daily in temples across Egypt. In it, a high-ranking priest, or occasionally the pharaoh, washed, anointed, and elaborately dressed the god's statue before presenting it with offerings. Afterward, when the god had consumed the spiritual essence of the offerings, the items themselves were taken to be distributed among the priests.

== Personal ==
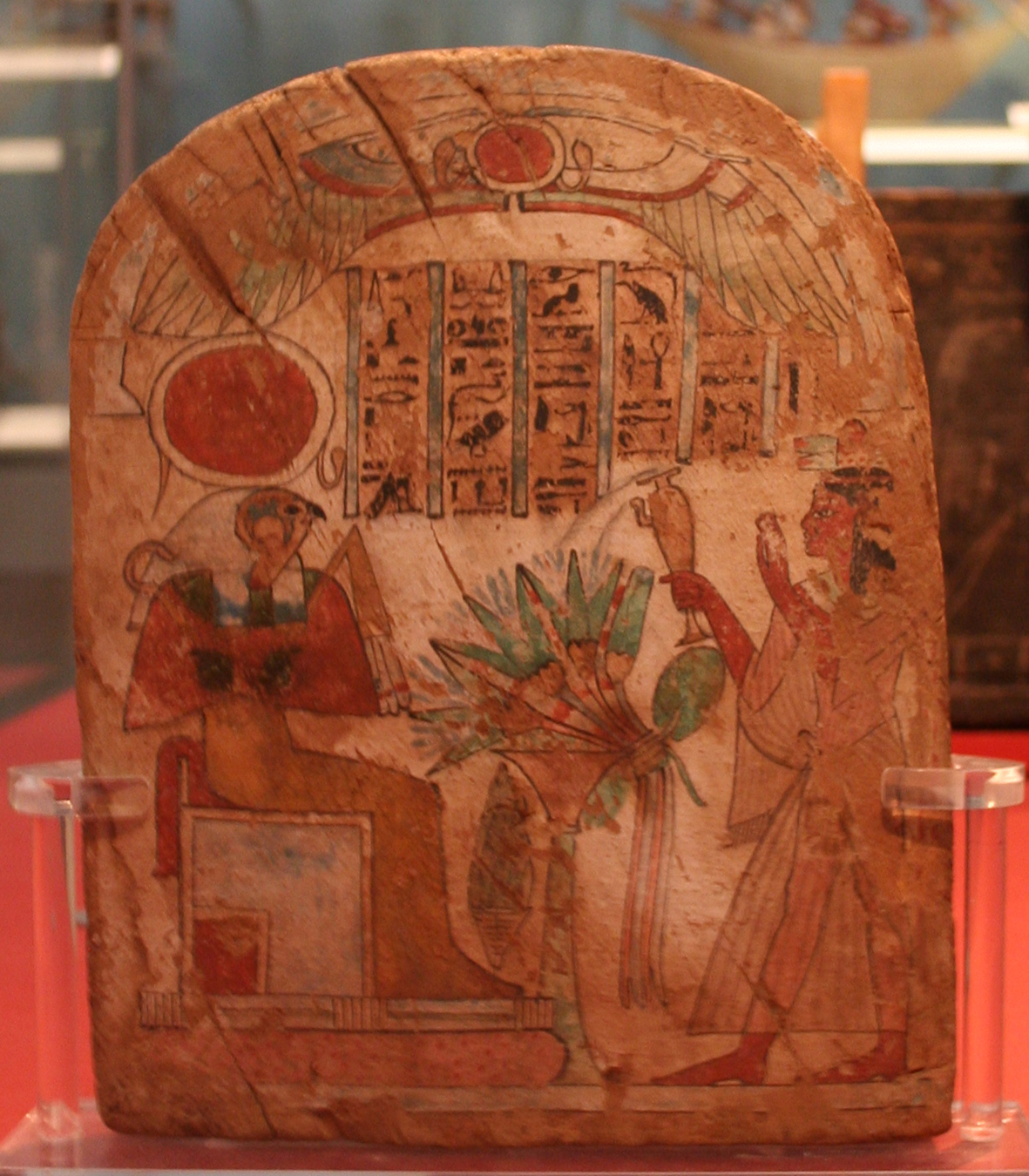
Wooden stela on display at the British Museum

Individual Egyptians also prayed to gods and gave them private offerings. Evidence of this type of personal piety is sparse before the New Kingdom. This is probably due to cultural restrictions on depiction of nonroyal religious activity, which relaxed during the Middle and New Kingdoms. Personal piety became still more prominent in the late New Kingdom, when it was believed that the gods intervened directly in individual lives, punishing wrongdoers and saving the pious from disaster.

== Modern times ==
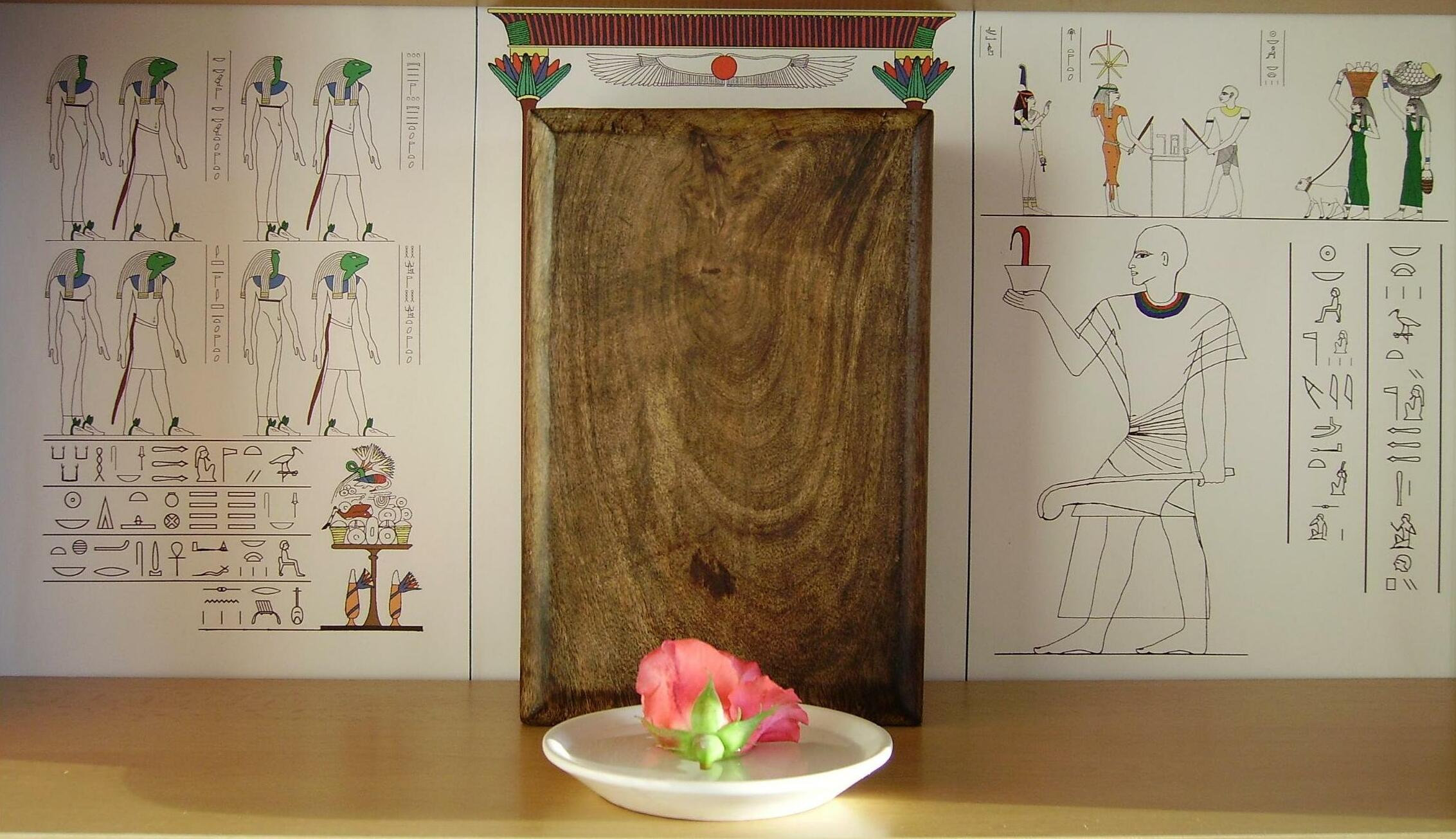
Kemetic altar with a small offering

Followers of Kemetism, the revival and modern-day following of the ancient Egyptian religion, generally worship and perform offering to a few gods (Maat, Bastet, Anubis, Sekhmet or Thoth, among others), but recognize the existence of every god. Altars and offerings are most often constructed using a statue or two-dimensional representation of one or more given deities, as they serve as the focal point of worship. Other additional items include candles, votive offerings, prayer beads, incense burners, and one or more dishes for food offerings. Most Kemetic offerings try to keep to tradition, offering the same or similar items the ancient Egyptians would have offered.

== See also ==
- Ancient Egyptian offering formula

== Notes ==
=== Works cited ===
- Redford, Donald B, ed. (2001). The Oxford Encyclopedia of Ancient Egypt. Oxford University Press. ISBN 0-19-510234-7.
