= The Pagan School =

Essay by Charles Baudelaire

"The Pagan School" (French: L'École païenne) is an essay by the French writer Charles Baudelaire. First published in 1852, it is critical of the neopaganism of its time, which existed in explicit form among supporters of the French Revolution of 1848. From this starting point, Baudelaire criticised a broader trend of striving for material beauty and sensory pleasure, which he said would leave people unsatisfied and make it hard to maintain relationships. He argued in opposition of art that is visually pleasing and called for art and literature that is ugly, comical and attuned to science and philosophy.

"The Pagan School" is in line with Baudelaire's aversion to pantheistic views and contains a specifically modern rejection of classicism. It addresses the modern idea of the god Pan as an embodiment of revolutionary momentum, which Baudelaire viewed as artificial. The essay has been interpreted in relation to the art for art's sake movement, modern iconoclasm and the connections between religion, art and politics.

== Summary ==
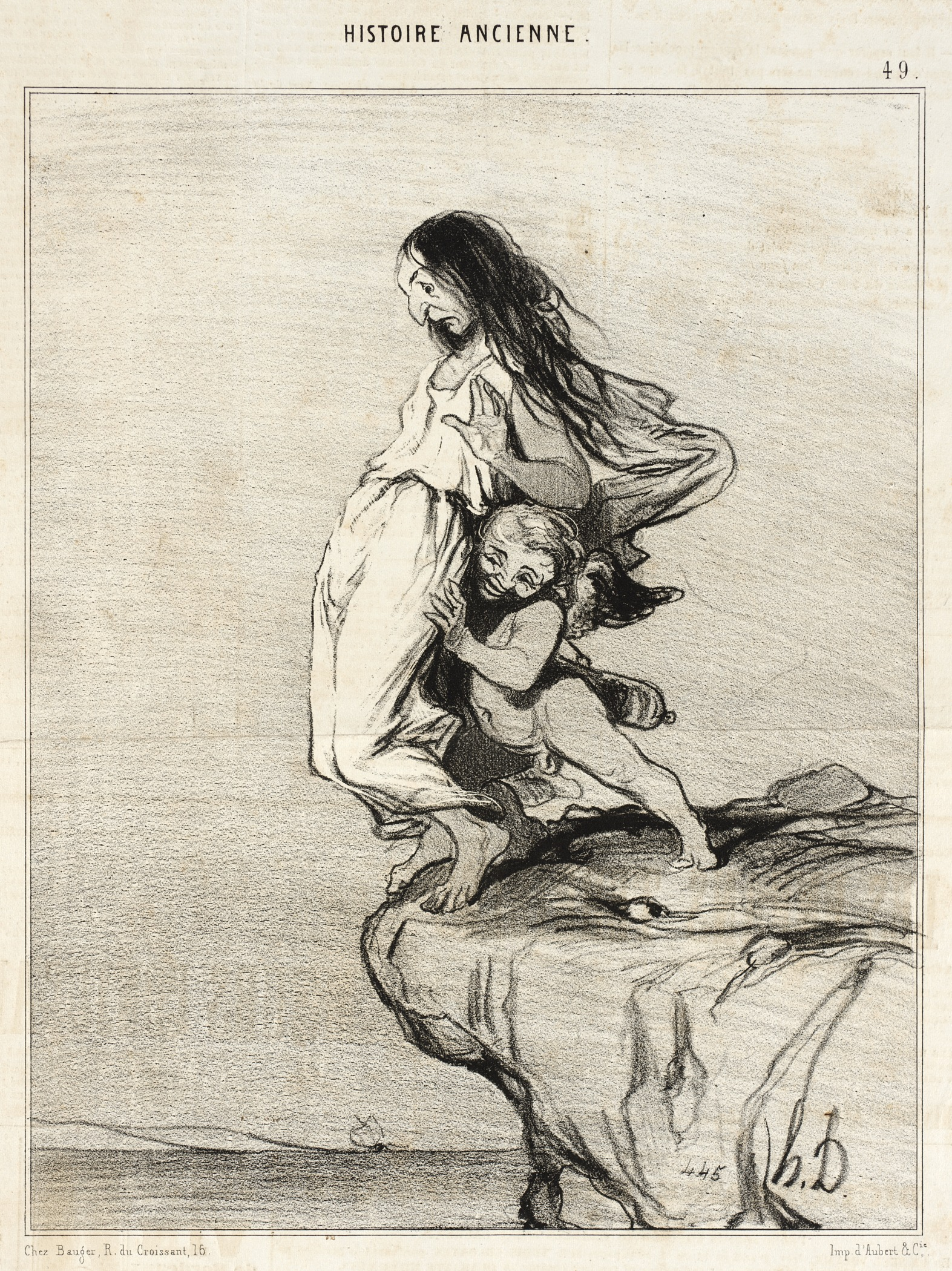
Baudelaire preferred Honoré Daumier's comical visions of ancient history and described Sappho (pictured here by Daumier) as a "patroness of hysterical women".

Charles Baudelaire opened "The Pagan School" with an anecdote from an event celebrating the French Revolution of 1848, where he met a young man who raised a toast to Pan and attributed the revolution to this god. At Baudelaire' inquiry, the man identified himself as a pagan and said paganism was returning after temporarily having been obscured by Christianity. He said he had seen the real gaze of Juno through an actress who portrayed her on stage. Baudelaire described the man as part of a trend of neopagans who had read too much Heinrich Heine and come to resent Christians while evoking ancient gods and celebrating beauty. According to Baudelaire, they would attribute social problems to the lack of beauty in Christianity. He used Honoré Daumier's print series L'Histoire ancienne (1842–1843), which used material from antiquity in comical and ugly ways, as a positive counter-example.

For Baudelaire, the evocation of the gods was seemingly harmless, but in the seeking of meaning in material beauty and sensory pleasure he saw a great danger. Aesthetically, it produced pastiches without value, because it dismissed passion and reason. It left no room for improvement, because it denied the preceding achievements of Christianity and philosophy. By surrounding themselves with plastic arts, people risked losing the ability to appreciate other things than beauty; Baudelaire argued that a man who grew up surrounded by sensory stimulation would become perpetually unsatisfied, make other people unhappy and likely die at an early age, because he would lack reason and be unable to enjoy honest activities. He would be incapable of having fruitful relationships and would at most appreciate other humans as forms.

Baudelaire argued that being absorbed by art erases the notions of just and true and leads to coldness and pride. He said he understood iconoclasm, Islamic aniconism and Augustine's condemnation of excessive visual pleasure. He condemned people who approached charity through aesthetics and personal pleasure. At the end of "The Pagan School", he called for a literature that is on good terms with science and philosophy, because the alternative is "homicidal and suicidal".

== Publication ==
"The Pagan School" was first published on 22 January 1852 in the magazine La Semaine théâtrale. An English translation by Lois Boe Hyslop and Francis E. Hyslop was included in the volume Baudelaire as a Literary Critic (1964).

== Analysis and reception ==
Baudelaire's attack on the "pagan school" was connected to his general aversion to pathos, rural lyricism and worldviews that see something sacred in nature, which he in a letter to Fernand Desnoyers dismissed as the belief in "sanctified vegetables". The reference to Heine was due to works such as the French-language book De l'Allemagne (1834), where Heine promoted pantheism as "the sanctification of nature and the reintegration of man into his divine rights". The historian of literature Michel Brix says the principal targets of "The Pagan School" were Gérard de Nerval, Théophile Gautier and Heine. The literary scholars J. A. Hiddleston and Edward K. Kaplan say it is about the art for art's sake movement.

Brix uses "The Pagan School" to complicate the reception of French Romanticism, which is typically viewed as a turn away from Greek and Roman influences. Hiddleston says Baudelaire did not necessarily think it was wrong to use ancient subjects, but rejected the copying of manners that were at odds with the spirit of modernity. The theologian George Pattison writes that the essay's specifically modern rejection of classicism highlights the complex relationship between Christian and secular or nihilist iconoclasm. According to Pattison, "The Pagan School" shows "how the spirit of the second commandment has had an impact on western culture that cannot be limited to the narrow puritanical form of hostility to images".

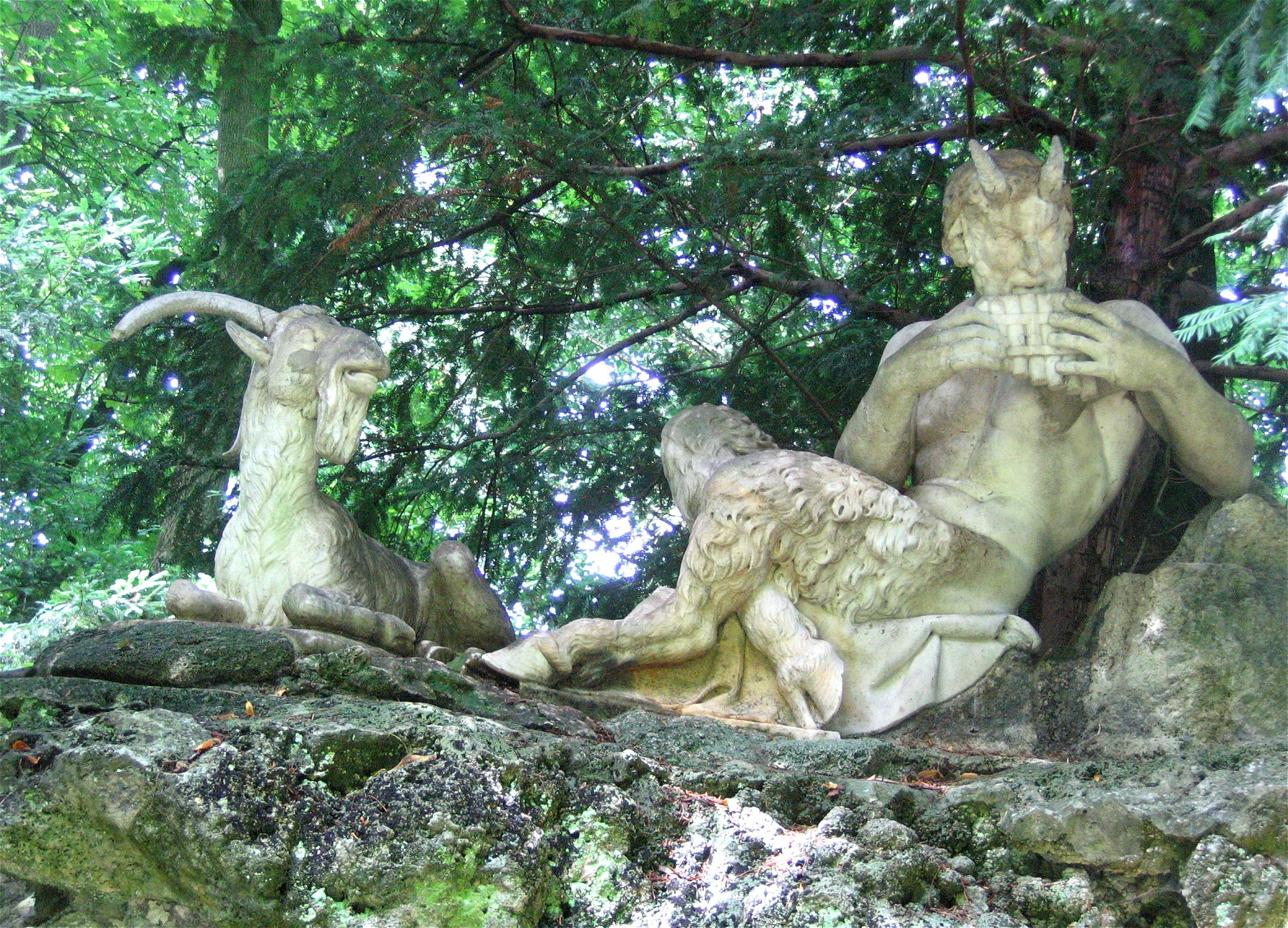
The Pan group (1815) by Peter Simon Lamine, Nymphenburg Palace Park

In 19th-century culture and political writings, the god Pan often embodied pantheism and the spirit of revolution. Baudelaire evoked him in the poem "La Muse malade" in Les Fleurs du mal, where he stood for a positive and ancient vigor. By the time he wrote "The Pagan School", Baudelaire was disillusioned with this imagery and viewed it as artificial and disconnected from the momentum of real popular movements. He wrote that the young neopagan "spoke of the god Pan as if he were the prisoner of St. Helena", which is a reference to Napoleon, who was nicknamed Grand Pan (lit. 'Great Pan').

The dialogue with the neopagan references Plutarch's De Defectu Oraculorum (lit. 'On the Decline of Oracles'), a text that addresses the possibility for mortality among gods, and contains an anecdote where a mysterious voice announced that Pan had died. When Baudelaire alluded to this, the young man said Pan was alive, argued that paganism contained "the true doctrines" but had been obscured by Christianity, and that it will "save the world". The French studies scholar Susan Blood connects this to a technique in Christian exegesis, where gods and myths of other religions are viewed as prefigurations of Christianity, making them old and outdated once Christianity has arrived. The neopagan in "The Pagan School" used an alternative exegesis where paganism is eternally young and Christianity is the result of corruption, and thereby old. Blood says that by reversing the Christian technique of prefiguration, the neopagan added Christian characteristics to Pan and thus did not fully abolish Jesus, but used his characteristics to bring Pan to "completion". Blood says "La Muse malade" similarly alludes to Christianity through its description of Pan as "le seigneur des moissons" (lit. 'the lord of the harvest').

The English critic George Saintsbury called "The Pagan School" remarkable and said it highlights Baudelaire's ability to look at a subject from multiple sides. A brief anecdote in the essay about a man who gave a counterfeit coin to a beggar was later developed into Baudelaire's prose poem "La Fausse Monnaie".

== See also ==
- Criticism of modern paganism
- Neoclassicism in France
- Pan in popular culture
