= Kemetism =

Contemporary practice of Ancient Egyptian religion

Kemetism (also Kemeticism or Kemetic paganism; sometimes referred to as Neterism, from netjer "god") is a neopagan religion based on the beliefs of ancient Egypt, which emerged during the 1970s. A Kemetic is one who follows Kemetism.

There are several main groups, each of which takes a different approach to its beliefs, ranging from eclectic to reconstructionist. These can be divided into three types: reconstructed Kemetism, a syncretic approach, and the more monotheistic Kemetic Orthodoxy.

== Etymology ==
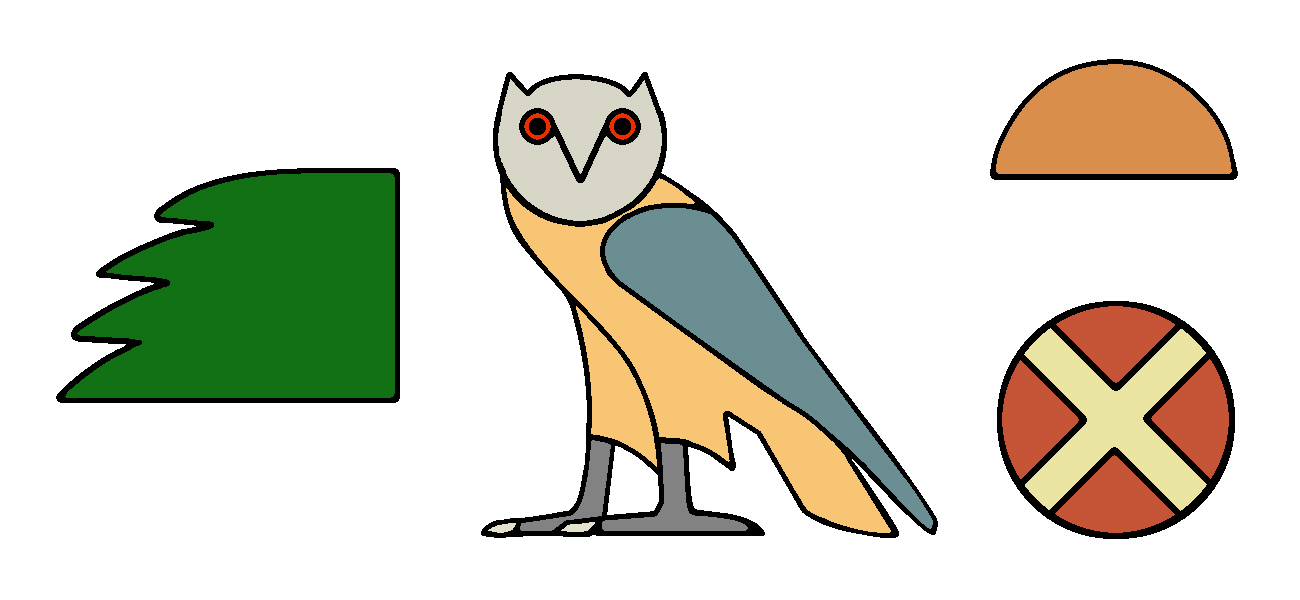
Hieroglyphic writing "Kemet"

The movement's name is based on an endonym of Egypt, Kemet (the conventional vocalization of hieroglyphic notation km.t). The word is also sometimes written as Takemet, from the fuller tꜣ km.t. In translation from Egyptian, it means "black" (or in longer form "black land"), which is derived from the black colour of the fertile mud brought by the Nile during the annual floods (currently no longer occurring due to the existence of the Aswan Dam).

Kemetics sometimes refer to the ancient Egyptian deities as the Netjeru, also referred to as the Neteru or the Netjer. Kemetics also commonly prefer to refer to the Netjeru with the conventional Egyptological orthography of their original ancient Egyptian name: for example, they would refer to Horus as Heru and Anubis as Anpu.

== Reconstruction ==
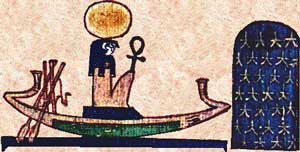
The traditional ancient idea of a solar god in a barque; his daily voyage across the sky (𓇯)

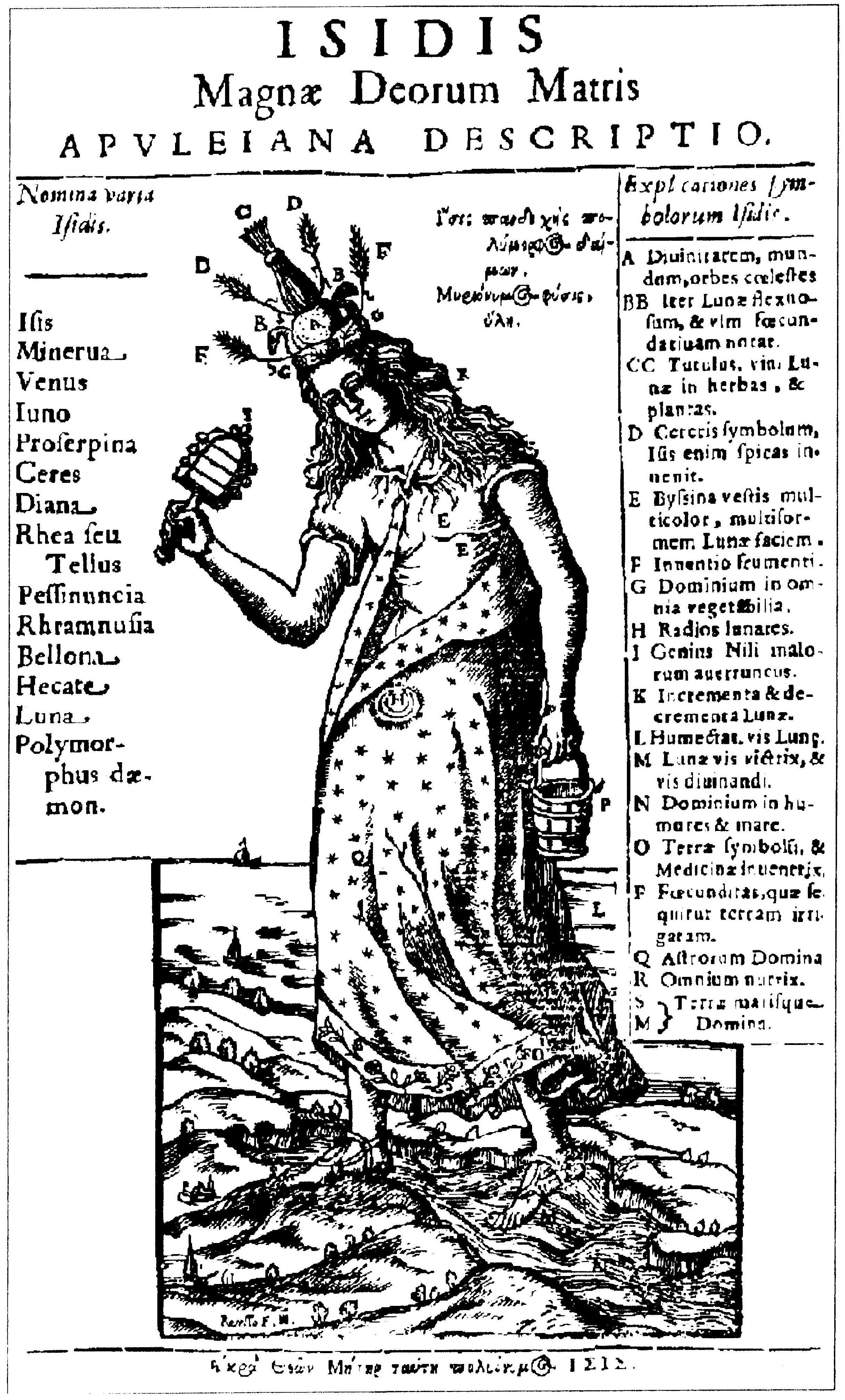
Ancient Isis (ancient Egyptian Isis) in modern imagery; she holds a sistrum in her hand

Some Kemetics or hermeticists claim direct continuity with secret societies allegedly continuously existing since the prohibition of paganism by Roman emperor Theodosius I in 392 CE, or since the closing of the last functional Egyptian temple (of the goddess Isis on the island of Philae) by Emperor Justinian around 535. However, these claims are historically unprovable.

Since the Hellenistic period, ancient Egyptian religion has influenced many belief systems. For example, Hermeticism is based on the teachings of Hermes Trismegistus (a combination of the Greek god Hermes and the Egyptian god Thoth). Early and medieval Christianity also incorporated ancient Egyptian thought, including in extra-biblical legends of the stay of Jesus in Egypt, the recognition of the authority of Hermes Trismegistus by the Church Fathers and Medieval philosophers, or the adaptation of myths associated with the goddess Isis. These mythologies usually interpret ancient Egyptian culture, religion, and gods symbolically. In contrast, the goal of Kemetic groups is a more or less rigorous restoration of the religious system in its historical form, although Kemetists generally admit that a completely accurate imitation of ancient practices is not always possible or even advisable.

Ancient Egyptian religion underwent complex transformations across time and was worshipped differently in different locations. One god could have different mythological associations and forms of worship in individual nomes or even individual temples. It is difficult to seek a purely original form of Egyptian religion that can be easily pointed to and reconstructed (see Reconstructionism).

== Principles of Kemetism ==
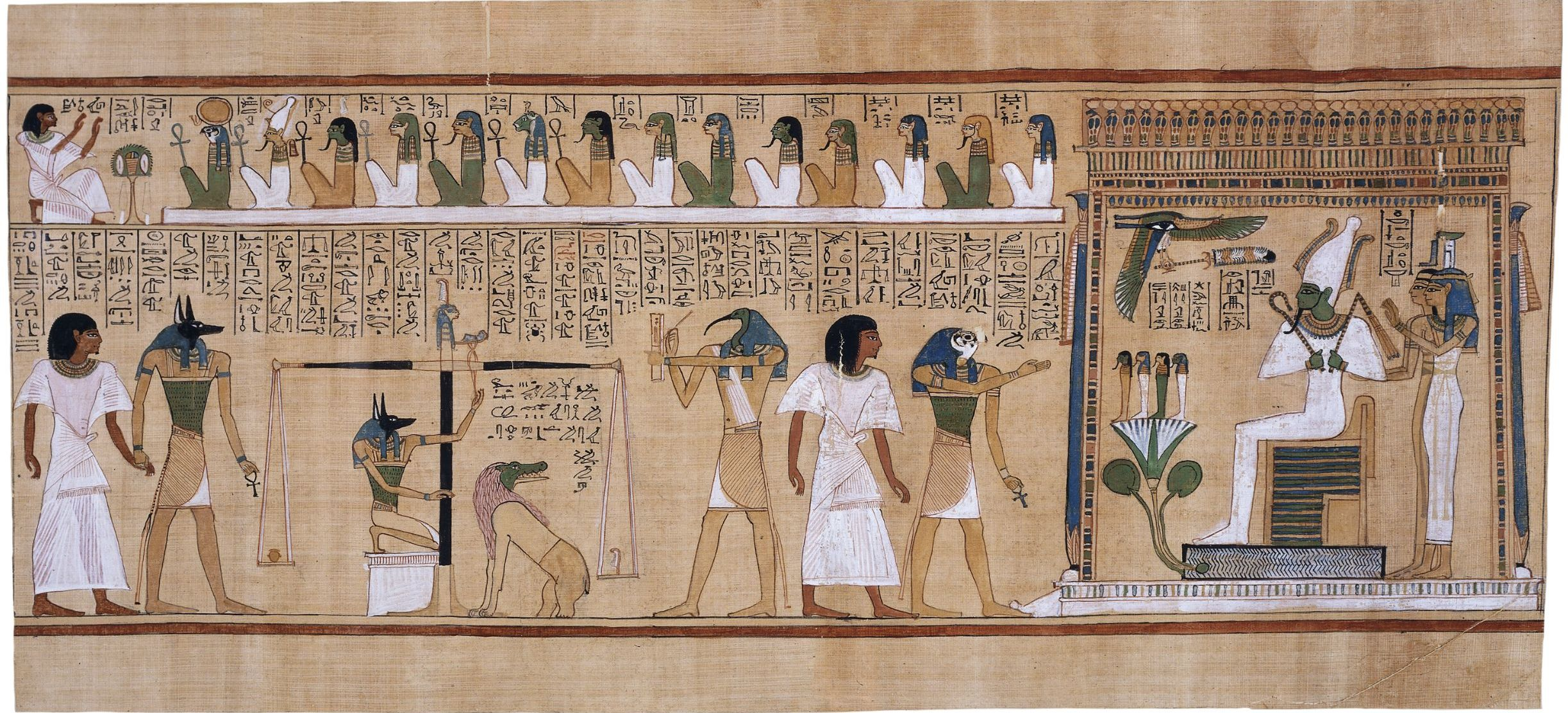
Hunefer kneels in adoration before a company of deities.

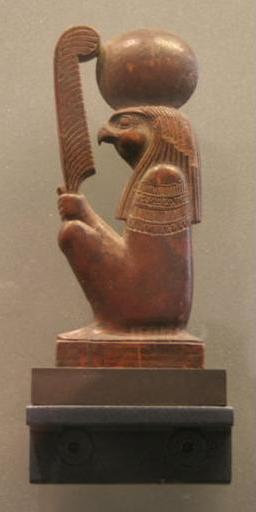
Sun god as "Lord of Order"

One important principle of Kemeticism is maat (order). This concept was one of the cornerstones of religious thought of the Ancient Egyptians – its observance was supposed to ensure the stability of the world and its orderly running. Its importance is evident from the fact that even the pharaoh, who was understood as a divine being, was primarily tasked with bearing responsibility for and contributing to maat. The epitome of the concept in Ancient Egyptian religion was the eponymous goddess Maat and her symbol the ostrich feather.

As a result, the respect of rules of all kinds by each individual was synonymous with support and maintenance of the cosmic order, while their non-observance could lead to its disruption. The collapse of maat would lead to the demise of the world and the victory of chaos. In pursuit of maat, Kemetic practitioners may follow prevailing ethical ideas and good manners. However, there is no explicitly binding text codifying moral norms.

== Religious practice ==
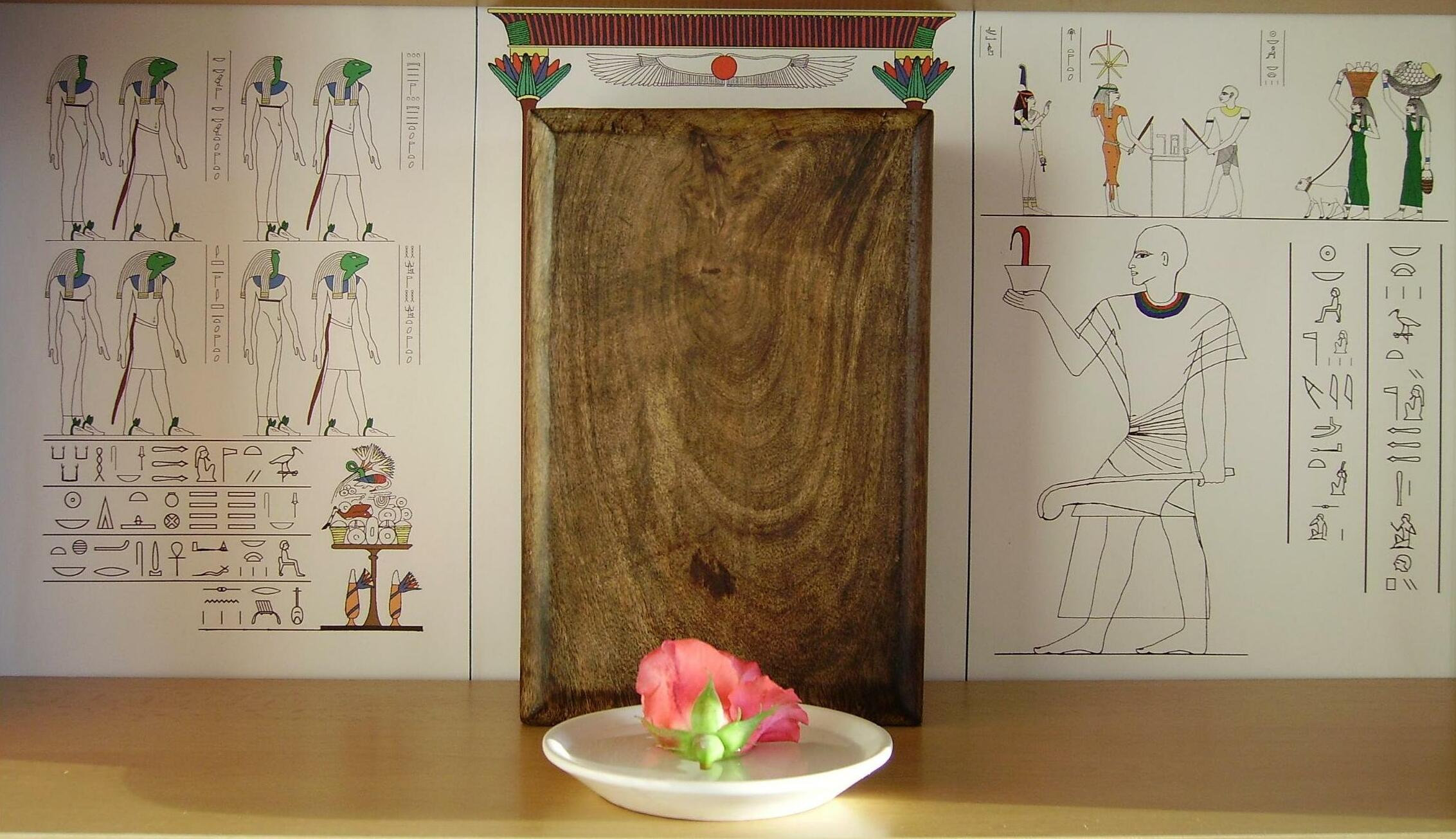
A Kemetic altar with a small offering

Ancient Egyptian practice venerated maat, a concept encompassing truth and honor. Ritual worship of the gods in pursuit of maat is thus considered holy. Commonly worshipped Old Egyptian gods include Ra, Amun, Isis and Osiris, Thoth, Sekhmet, Bastet, Hathor, and others.

This worship generally takes the form of prayer, offerings, and setting up altars. Altars are most often constructed using a statue or two-dimensional representation of one or more given deities, as they serve as the focal point of worship.

Additional altar items include candles, votive offerings, prayer beads, incense burners, and one or more dishes for food offerings. Most Kemetic offerings try to keep to tradition, offering the same or similar items the ancient Egyptians would have offered.

== Kemetic organizations ==
=== Kemetic Orthodoxy ===
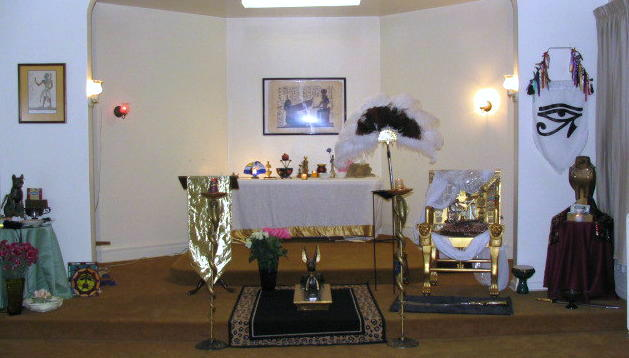
The Truth and the Mother, the main shrine of Kemetic Orthodoxy

The American Society of Kemetic Orthodoxy was founded in the 1980s. It brings together members from various states and, according to its own characterization, attempts to follow the Egyptian traditions as closely as possible and to revive them.

Entirely in this spirit, it is headed by an authority (currently Tamara Siuda) using some of the titles and other attributes of ancient pharaohs. She is conceived as the present incarnation of the royal ka, gold embedded in the spirit of Hora, an aspect of divinity embodied in the human form of a spiritual leader of the community.

On the other hand, it is in this movement that the departure from the traditionalist (i.e., closest to Egyptian religion) conception of god/gods, expressed in the concept of monolatry as official doctrine, is most pronounced.

=== Fellowship of Isis ===
Another type of Kemetic organization is the Fellowship of Isis, formed in Ireland. It differs from most others in that, following the model of late antiquity in the henotheistic sense, it focuses on the cult of the goddess Isis, transposed into ancient Greek and Roman settings. Egyptian traditions are therefore heavily modified from their ancient interpretation, by religious syncretism, and by modern multiculturalism.

=== Ausar Auset Society ===
The Ausar Auset Society is a Pan-African spiritual organization founded in 1973 by Ra Un Nefer Amen. It is based in Brooklyn, New York. They use ancient Egyptian aesthetics as basis of their religion.

=== Other ===
Other Kemetist societies include The Living Nuhati, and the defunct French Ta Noutri.

== See also ==
- Egyptian mythology
- List of Neopagan movements
- List of religions and spiritual traditions
- Hermeticism
- Temple of Set – an unrelated religion, centered around the Egyptian god Set
