= Kemetic Orthodoxy =

Religious movement based on Kemeticism, a reconstruction of ancient Egyptian religion

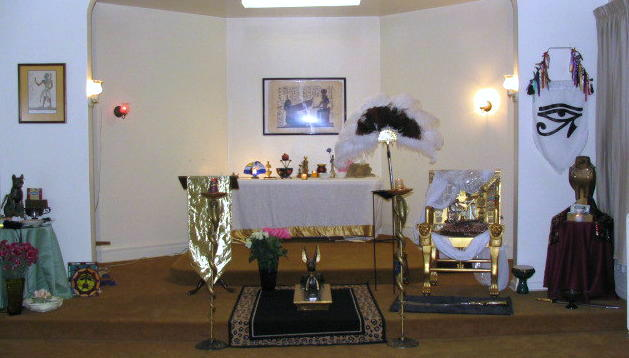
The Truth and the Mother, the main shrine of Kemetic Orthodoxy

Kemetic Orthodoxy is a modern religious movement based on the reconstruction of the ancient Egyptian religion known as Kemeticism. It was founded in 1988 by Tamara Siuda, who until 2023 was recognized as the leader of the movement, referred to as its "Nisut" or "Pharaoh."

Kemetic Orthodoxy is often considered a cultic religion. Followers prioritize the practice of "correct" action, rituals, and liturgy rather than adhering to a specific scripture. Worship often takes place in both public and personal shrines. The main temple is located in Joliet, Illinois and various shrines are maintained by priests worldwide.

The faith is guided by five fundamental principles: upholding ma'at (cosmic order), belief in Netjer (the supreme being), veneration of akhu (ancestors), participation in and respect for the community, and acknowledgment of Siuda as the Nisut. Practitioners of the faith are known as "Shemsu".

Kemetic Orthodoxy has attracted attention from sociologists and Egyptologists for its size, prominence on the internet, and its influence on Kemeticism as a whole. Many other Kemetic groups have emerged from or defined themselves in relation to it. The presence of a central authority and emphasis on tradition within Kemetic Orthodoxy sets it apart from other predominantly online-organized religions. It also challenges early theories about the nature of religion on the internet.

== Main beliefs ==
The Ankh is a Kemetic symbol of eternal life in both antiquity and modern times.

Kemetic Orthodoxy is based on the religious practices of Ancient Egypt, although it is not strictly a reconstructionist religion. While it draws from primary Egyptian sources, it also incorporates additional rites developed by Siuda and incorporates elements from other modern African Traditional Religions and African diaspora religions.

The belief system of Kemetic Orthodoxy centers around five principal tenets, often described as four main tenets unified by a fundamental commitment to upholding ma'at. These tenets are not considered dogma by the organization. Instead, they serve as a foundation for the beliefs of most Kemetic Orthodoxy members, but individual beliefs may vary. The religion does not mandate uniformity in practice, and differing viewpoints are seen as different ways of understanding God, or Netjer.

=== Belief in upholding Ma'at ===
In Ancient Egyptian religion, Ma'at represents the principles of truth, justice, and balance, as well as the goddess embodying these ideals. Upholding Ma'at is of great importance in Kemetic Orthodox practice. The rituals and prayers performed by members are considered to contribute to the preservation and promotion of Ma'at. Additionally, members are encouraged to take tangible steps in addressing social justice matters. The House of Netjer has publicly denounced police violence and anti-immigration policies in the USA.

=== Belief in Netjer (the supreme being) ===
Kemetic Orthodoxy holds the belief that the Ancient Egyptian gods are manifestations of a supreme being known as Netjer, which can be translated as "divine power". These manifestations are referred to as the "Names" of Netjer. While the House of Netjer's website may describe this belief as monolatry, it is more accurately characterized as inclusive monotheism. The Names are understood to encompass personal deities, impersonal forces, and metaphorical concepts simultaneously. It is also recognized that Names can merge and identify with one another, resulting in historically documented syncretizations, such as Sekhmet-Hathor. Siuda believes that the gods manifest in this way to allow for human comprehension.

Members of Kemetic Orthodoxy report receiving communication from Netjer through dreams, omens, divination, and sensing its presence in natural phenomena.

=== Akhu (Ancestor) veneration ===
Members of Kemetic Orthodoxy believe that their ancestors reside in the Duat as Akhu. As Akhu have already experienced human life, it is believed that they can offer valuable guidance and support to their descendants in matters related to daily life. Honoring the Akhu is seen as a way to ensure their happiness and contentment in the Duat.

There are various ways in which members believe they can honor their Akhu. These practices range from maintaining household ancestor shrines where offerings can be made, to writing letters addressed to the Akhu and posting them on a dedicated website, similar to the tradition of writing letters to the deceased in Ancient Egypt.

Within Kemetic Orthodoxy, Akhu are generally classified into three categories: Family, National, and Associational.

Family Akhu encompass deceased family members such as parents, siblings, and children.

National Akhu are associated with the Kemetic Orthodoxy organization. This can be compared to the veneration of pharaohs or other individuals in Ancient Egypt.

Associational Akhu include any other Akhu connected to an individual, whether through direct contact with the Akhu, shared interests, or other reasons for forming a bond. Examples may include celebrities or political leaders.

=== Participation in and respect for the community ===
Members are encouraged to view Kemetic Orthodoxy as an extended spiritual community. The House of Netjer provides resources such as spiritual counseling, discussion groups, and fellowship chats over IRC and on their forum to foster a sense of belonging and connection among members. Kemetic Orthodoxy also places importance on the role of family in the personal lives of adherents, promoting the cultivation of strong relationships and understanding with family members. This concept is closely tied to the principle of Akhu veneration, highlighting the value placed on honoring and maintaining bonds with one's ancestors.

The Double Crown is a symbol of kingship, and thus of the Nisut. The two parts of the crown symbolize the two halves (upper and lower) of Ancient Egypt.

=== Acknowledgment of Siuda as the Nisut ===
During her tenure, the recognition of Tamara L. Siuda as the spiritual leader, or Nisut-Bity, held significant importance within Kemetic Orthodoxy. The teachings and guidance provided by Siuda form the foundation of the religion. Additionally, adherents believe that the Nisut embodies the current manifestation of the "kingly ka" or invested spirit of Heru. Upon her coronation in 1996, Siuda's followers believed she became the 196th Pharaoh of the Ancient Egyptian religion. In Ancient Egypt, the Pharaoh held both political and religious authority, serving as the direct link between the people and Netjer (God). However, within Kemetic Orthodoxy, Siuda's role primarily focused on the religious aspect of this position. As the Nisut, Siuda fulfilled various responsibilities, including performing daily rituals to uphold ma'at (truth, justice, and balance) and counter isfet (chaos), offering regular prayers for the members of the faith, and providing guidance on religious matters to her followers. Adherents do not worship Siuda as a deity but attribute to her a semi-divine status.

Siuda publicly announced her abdication from the position of Nisut on August 1, 2023, stating that the role placed too much responsibility and authority on one person. She additionally expressed that she had been hesitant to take on the role to begin with, but believed that Netjer deemed it necessary at the time. The organizational structure that Kemetic Orthodoxy will now take has not yet been determined.

== Worship ==
Worship practices in Kemetic Orthodoxy encompass a variety of forms. The religion includes official rituals conducted by the priesthood and the Nisut (spiritual leader) of Kemetic Orthodoxy. Additionally, there is a daily rite called Senut performed by temple members. Individual practitioners also have the freedom to engage in more personalized forms of worship.

Kemetic Orthodoxy adheres to a festival calendar that draws inspiration from historical sources. This calendar aligns with the celestial phenomena observed in ancient calendars, but it is adjusted based on the position of the modern "royal residence" at the organization's main temple and headquarters in Joliet.

=== Group worship ===
There are various types of group rituals in Kemetic Orthodoxy, some of which can be conducted in person while others are simulcasted through Internet Relay Chat. In simulcasted rituals, participants in the chat room are informed about the ongoing activities by a priest who is physically present at the Truth and the Mother Shrine. At certain points, participants joining remotely may be asked to perform a ritual action at home and notify the attending priest in the chat room once completed.

Kemetic Orthodoxy has a significant online presence. Siuda said it is a religion that exists on the internet rather than an internet-based religion. Offline gatherings and rituals are also organized by members of Kemetic Orthodoxy. The Kemetic New Year, Wep Ronpet, is a notable event that takes place at Tawy House in August, where members come together for rituals, fellowship, lectures, and workshops.

One example of group worship in Kemetic Orthodoxy is Saq, as mentioned by Krogh & Pillifant (2004). Saq involves ritual possession, where a specialized priest is believed to be fully possessed by a deity. Through this medium, the deity communicates with members of Kemetic Orthodoxy and accepts offerings. Saq rituals can be conducted entirely in person or simulcasted online, with participants in the online platform sending messages to the attending priest, who then relays them to the deity during possession. It is described as one of the most profound and immediate experiences in Kemetic Orthodoxy.

=== Personal/Individual worship ===
Individuals engage in worship through a wide range of practices, encompassing both structured rituals and spontaneous prayers. Worship is a continuous and personal process. Here are a few examples of personal worship and rituals:

==== Personal shrines ====
Most members of Kemetic Orthodoxy incorporate household shrines into their devotional practices. These shrines serve as a dedicated space for worshiping the deities they follow. The essential components of a shrine include an incense burner or diffuser, a lamp or candle, and a designated area for offerings. The shrine may feature representations of specific deities or have a more generalized focus. It often contains objects that have been offered to the deities. Individuals utilize these shrines to perform various rituals, including the daily rite of Senut. They may honor deities they feel a particular connection to, deities associated with specific festivals or seasons, or deities for whom they have a specific request.

Alongside these personal shrines dedicated to deities, members of Kemetic Orthodoxy are encouraged to establish shrines to their ancestors or Akhu as part of ancestor veneration. These shrines typically hold mementos and items associated with deceased individuals who were close to the member. They serve as the central focal point for honoring ancestors within the member's home.

==== Senut ritual ====
Senut, which translates to "shrine", is a ritual created by Siuda specifically for members of Kemetic Orthodoxy. It is a formal worship practice within a framework where dedicated temples and regional shrines may be unavailable. The Senut ritual encompasses multiple rites and is designed to be a comprehensive ritual that can be performed individually. It contains all the essential elements found in Kemetic rituals, ensuring that practitioners can engage in a fully functional ritual regardless of whether they are practicing alone or as part of a group.

==== Other personal worship ====
In addition to the Senut ritual, Kemetic Orthodoxy allows for the development of personal and informal forms of worship. Members are encouraged to cultivate their own individual practices, which can vary from person to person. Informal prayers and worship are recognized as vital components of the faith.

While individual worship holds significant importance in Kemetic Orthodoxy, the experiences and practices are often shared among fellow members of the religion. This shared aspect is intended to foster stronger connections between individuals and Netjer. Many practitioners express their devotion through artistic expressions such as paintings, drawings, sculptures, jewelry, poetry, music, dance, and storytelling. These creative works are often shared and appreciated by other members of the community.

== History ==
Kemetic Orthodoxy originated from the teachings of Siuda. The temple's foundation can be traced back to 1988 when Siuda reported having a series of visions during her initiation as a Wiccan priestess. Motivated to learn about ancient Egyptian religion as it was practiced, Siuda pursued a degree in Egyptology. She formed a small study and worship group during this time, which gradually attracted more members. In 1993, the group obtained federal recognition as a religious entity and changed its name from the House of Bast to the House of Netjer. The temple received tax-exempt status in 1999.

In 2003, the House of Netjer acquired a permanent building in Joliet, Illinois, to serve as the temple's home. This facility included the main state shrine for Kemetic Orthodoxy followers, known as The Truth and the Mother Shrine. It also housed the offices of some priesthood members, as well as Siuda's permanent living quarters and office.

== Community ==
The House of Netjer community spans across multiple countries, creating a global network of members. To facilitate communication and connection, members are organized into geographical regions. Certain regions hold regular meet-ups, providing opportunities for socializing, fellowship, and worship. Some gatherings even invite non-members to interact with the community.

In addition to in-person events, the community also holds online chats in various formats. Online events come in diverse forms, ranging from informal fellowship gatherings to structured educational sessions. These sessions involve group discussions led by one or more members on topics of interest.

=== Membership ===
There are two categories of membership in Kemetic Orthodoxy: Remetj and Shemsu. Remetj, which translates to "royal subjects", are commonly referred to as "friends of the faith". Remetj may include individuals who have completed the free online group introductory course but have not yet become full members, as well as those who intend to become members in the future but have not taken that step. Additionally, individuals who were born into the faith may also be considered Remetj. A person who was previously a full member but no longer holds that status may also be referred to as a Remetj.

Shemsu, meaning "followers", are individuals who have made the decision to become full members of the House of Netjer temple. To become a Shemsu, one must have previously been a Remetj (having completed the introductory course) and participate in a ritual that signifies full membership.

This ritual consists of two parts. The first part involves determining the convert's "Parent" and "Beloved" gods. According to Kemetic Orthodox belief, the Parent god(s) create the eternal soul, or ba, of the candidate, while the Beloved gods, who can be multiple, take a personal interest in guiding the individual throughout their life. This ritual, known as the "Ritual Parent Divination" (RPD), is a geomantic divination conducted by Siuda on behalf of the convert. The results of the RPD may be communicated through a face-to-face meeting between Siuda and the Remetj or through telephone and internet communication.

The second part of the ritual is a community gathering of Remetj and Shemsu known as Shemsu naming. Within the Shemsu group, there are those who have undergone an initiation rite called Weshem-ib, also known as the "testing of the heart". During this process, members take special vows not only prioritizing Kemetic Orthodoxy over other religious practices but also committing to serve the religion and its members. These responsibilities are in addition to the regular oaths taken by Shemsu. A Shemsu who has completed the Weshem-ib is referred to as a Shemsu-Ankh. All priests within Kemetic Orthodoxy must undertake this rite.

=== Priesthood ===
The priesthood of Kemetic Orthodoxy consists of both lay (non-ordained) and ordained priests, using the term "priest" for both males and females. The primary role of a priest is to serve the members of the faith, rather than the Names of Netjer.

A W'ab priest, known as a purity priest, is a lay priest within Kemetic Orthodoxy. These individuals are Shemsu-Ankh members who have undergone additional training and taken oaths of service to the faith community. As W'ab priests, their main responsibility is to oversee and assist with matters of purity. They are also responsible for maintaining an official shrine and conducting daily rituals there. Some of these shrines are open to visiting members, particularly for specific rituals and celebrations.

An Imakhu (plural Imakhiu), translated as revered one, is the only type of ordained priest in modern Kemetic Orthodoxy. They are granted legal credentials and have the right to use the title of "Reverend" outside of the Kemetic Orthodox faith. All Imakhu priests also serve as W'ab priests.

Imakhu priests have various responsibilities, including assisting the Nisut (spiritual leader) in supporting and guiding the faithful. This can involve counselling (if trained), conducting weddings, providing support and instruction to Remetj, Shemsu, and Beginners, and acting as official representatives of the Nisut. They also handle administrative tasks within the House of Netjer temple, such as managing finances, correspondence, time and resource management, reporting to the membership and Siuda, teaching, maintaining the Kemetic Orthodox online presence, scheduling appointments and trips for Siuda, ensuring personal security, and other related duties.

In recognition of exceptional service, an Imakhu may be granted the title of Kai-Imakhu, with the prefix "Kai" meaning "exalted". Kai-Imakhu priests, in addition to their regular Imakhu responsibilities, are also responsible for overseeing other Imakhu priests.

== Tawy House Retreat Center ==
The Tawy House Retreat Center organizes religious and study retreats for members of Kemetic Orthodoxy. These retreats include the week-long celebrations of Wep Ronpet, also known as Kemetic New Year's Day, which takes place in early August.

The Truth and the Mother Shrine is the primary state shrine for followers of the Kemetic Orthodox Religion. It encompasses a variety of individual and group deity shrines, such as the Akhu shrine and Nisut shrine. The specific shrines within the Truth and the Mother Shrine may rotate throughout the year based on current festivals and the needs of the community. Additionally, the Truth and the Mother Shrine is connected to various priest shrines located around the world.

The Imhotep Kemetic Orthodox Seminary is a school dedicated to the theological study of the Kemetic Orthodox religion. It offers introductory and intermediate classes in the Middle Egyptian language, as well as a course in Kemetic protective magic known as "Sau". While these courses are available, they are optional for all members of the faith.

The Udjat Foundation was a related non-profit organization specifically focused on supporting children's welfare causes.

== Kemetic Orthodoxy and other religions ==
Kemetic Orthodoxy does not maintain any formal affiliations or official relationships with other religions. Other contemporary Kemetic groups, such as Akhet Hwt-Hrw, Per Ankh, and Per Heh, operate independently and have beliefs distinct from Kemetic Orthodoxy.

=== Religious pluralism ===
In Kemetic Orthodoxy, it is acknowledged that individuals may choose to follow multiple religious paths. However, members are encouraged to maintain a clear separation between their Kemetic beliefs and practices and any other religious beliefs or practices they may hold. For those who have undergone the Weshem-ib or "testing of the heart" ritual, there is an expectation to prioritize their Kemetic practices and beliefs above other religious considerations. Participation in the Weshem-ib ritual is not obligatory for all Kemetic Orthodox members, although it is a mandatory requirement for priesthood.

=== Proselytism ===
The Kemetic Orthodox religion does not actively promote or encourage its members to seek converts.

== Offline references ==
- Dawson, Lorne & Cowan, Douglas. Religion Online: Finding Faith on the Internet. Routledge, 2004. ISBN 0-415-97021-0
- Harrison, Paul (2018). Profane Egyptologists: The Modern Revival of Ancient Egyptian Religion. Routledge. ISBN 978-0-367-89101-5.
- Krogh, Marilyn. & Pillifant, Brooke Ashley. "Kemetic Orthodoxy: Ancient Egyptian Religion on the Internet: A Research Note". Sociology of Religion 65.2(2004): 167–175.
- Siuda, Tamara L. The Ancient Egyptian Prayerbook. Azrael, 2005. ISBN 1-894981-04-9
