= Verein für germanisches Heidentum =

German neopagan organisation

- Abbreviation: VfGH
- Formation: 1994; 32 years ago
- Type: Religious organisation
- Location: Germany
- Website: www.vfgh.de
- Formerly called: Odinic Rite Deutschland

The Verein für germanisches Heidentum (German pronunciation: [fɛɐˈʔaɪn fyːɐ ˌɡɛʁˈmaːnɪʃəs ˈhaɪdn̩tuːm], lit. 'Association for Germanic paganism'), abbreviated VfGH, is a Germanic neopagan organisation in Germany. It began in 1994 as the German chapter of the British Odinic Rite and was called the Odinic Rite Deutschland. It became independent in 2004 and changed its name in 2006. Though it has never had many members, it is nonetheless influential among German neopagans. Prominent people within the organisation have included Bernd Hicker, who was its first leader, and Fritz Steinbock, who has managed and influenced its religious practice.

The VfGH practices Germanic paganism conceived as a polytheistic religion connected to the region of Central and Northern Europe. By tying the practice to a geographic location, it rejects both völkisch religiosity and universalist approaches. Central to the practice are reinvented blóts—ceremonies that may involve invocations of gods, drinking and sacrificial gifts—which are held by local groups. Members are allowed to have varying beliefs and priestly functions are limited to performing rituals. The organisation explicitly abstains from politics but allows members who are politically engaged elsewhere, which has led to some controversy over individual members with far-right views.

== History ==
In 1994, a group of Germans founded the Odinic Rite Deutschland (ORD), a legally and organisationally independent German association affiliated with the Odinic Rite (OR), a Germanic neopagan organisation that originated in the United Kingdom in 1973. In its early history, the ORD was heavily influenced by Bernd Hicker, who served as its chairman for its first seven years. During the 1990s, it collaborated with the Yggdrasil-Kreis, a group that professed a "European religion of nature" and sought to combine Germanic and Celtic paganism.

Concerns about connections between the British OR and far-right politics were already expressed in the ORD's members' magazine by 1995. Together with differing views on religious practice and organisational matters, these concerns eventually led the ORD to sever its ties with the British organisation in 2004. The ORD subsequently reorganised its internal structure around small local groups and introduced a process for electing officials. In 2006, it changed its name to the Verein für germanisches Heidentum (VfGH; lit. 'Association for Germanic paganism'). At the same Bundesthing, a central meeting held in the spring, chairman Volker G. Kunze stepped down and Haimo Grebenstein was elected as his successor.

The VfGH grew from around 40 members in 2004 to around 80 in 2010. Although it never became a large organisation, it was influential within German neopaganism during this period. Its most influential theorist has been Fritz Steinbock, also known as Asfrid, who has been responsible for much of the VfGH's religious management. In 2018, the journal Materialdienst described the VfGH as one of several Germanic neopagan organisations in Germany with "two to three dozen members".

== Beliefs ==
The VfGH describes Germanic paganism as a polytheistic religion and gods as "concrete, personal beings with individual personalities". The VfGH promotes a cyclical view of time and a view of death as a transition rather than a definite end. Rituals have a central role in the organisation's conception of pagan practice, which it defines as having "a living relationship to the gods, to nature and to everything holy that realizes itself actively".

The Germanic aspect is defined through location in Central and Northern Europe and dedication to the cultures of Germanic peoples. The VfGH's website describes Germanic paganism as "the religion of today's people who are members of a Germanic community by birth or association and who feel obliged to their heritage". The VfGH has described its approach as "nature religion" or "ethnic nature religion", where ethnic, which comes from the Greek word ethnos, is defined by Steinbock as "bond to location". The nature-oriented and place-specific approach means that the VfGH believe other gods exist elsewhere in the world.

Religious views that the VfGH explicitly rejects include theologies where gods are seen as aspects of an abstract divinity, as archetypes, or as symbols. It dismisses völkisch religiosity, which it describes as reliant on monotheist and dualist views. By associating the practice with a geographical region, it rejects universalist approaches where Germanic paganism can be practiced anywhere in the world.

The scholars René Gründer and Julia Dippel designate the VfGH as part of the "ecospiritual-tribalistic spectrum", (Note: Self-identification with the term "ecospiritual-tribalistic" is very unusual among practitioners and only occurs through engagement with Gründer's scholarship.) a term coined by Gründer for a current within Germany's neopagan scene that he traces to the 68 movement. Gründer describes this as a position between two supposed polar opposites, where the Germanic aspect either is determined by descent or is seen as a free individual choice. According to the scholar Stefanie von Schnurbein, the approach to paganism promoted by Steinbock and the VfGH contains a possible contradiction, because it dismisses genetic ideas about Germanic ancestry but assumes that language and culture are derived from a unity of gods, nature, and men.

== Activity ==
The VfGH is structured around regional groups called Herde (lit. 'hearths'). Rituals are typically conceived as modern revivals of blót ceremonies and may consist of invocations of gods, ritual drinking, sacrificial gift giving and incantations of runes. The rituals have been influenced by the OR's Book of Blótar—which codified rituals developed in the 1980s—and by Wicca, a British neopagan religion. The latter influence came via the Yggdrasil-Kreis and its leader Volkert Volkmann. Historical texts such as the Poetic Edda, Prose Edda and Old Norse sagas are used as sources of inspiration, but the VfGH regards its practices as reinventions rather than reconstructions, due to the scarcity and unreliability of historical sources.

Steinbock's book Das heilige Fest (2004; lit. 'The sacred feast') has been used as a reference work by members. The book contains instructions for a ritual in nine parts:

1. Haga and Wiha (enclosure and consecration of the location)
2. Heilazzen (greeting and invitation of the deities)
3. Reda (initial speech of the ritual leader)
4. Zunten (lighting the ritual fire)
5. Spill and Gibet (invocation and festive prayer)
6. Runagaldr (rune song)
7. Gilt (sacrificial circle of community and individuals)
8. Bluostrar (Blót – the libation)
9. Uzlaz (thanking and opening of the festive circle)

Beyond the basic principles, members are allowed to develop their own beliefs and practices. The VfGH has a structure where priestly functions are available to everyone and strictly limited to the performance of rituals. This approach, which the organisation calls the "guiding idea of free paganism" (German: Leitidee freies Heidentum), sets it apart from many other Germanic neopagan groups.

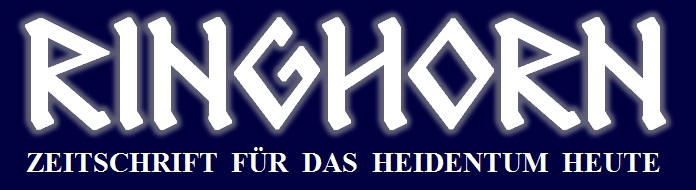
The VfGH publishes the magazine Ringhorn.

Since 1994, the VfGH publishes the magazine Ringhorn. Zeitschrift für das Heidentum heute (lit. 'Ring Horn: Magazine for Paganism Today'), with Steinbock as editor-in-chief. Verlag Daniel Junker, which published titles from 2002 to 2009, was described as the VfGH's house publisher. It was owned by a member and published books by members as well as an annual anthology, the Heidnisches Jahrbuch (lit. 'Pagan Yearbook'). (Note: Verlag Daniel Junker published the Heidnisches Jahrbuch for the years 2006–2010. Edition Roter Drache continued to publish it until 2012.)

In 2012, the VfGH co-organised the International Asatru Summer Camp, (Note: Asatru is a word for Old Norse religion, attested as the Swedish asatro since 1820.) an international meeting of Germanic neopagans. Its co-hosts were the German group Eldaring and the Dutch groups De negen verelden and Het Rad. In October 2017, it was the host of Frith Forge, an international conference initiated by the American organisation The Troth. The meeting was exclusively for "inclusive" Germanic neopagans, which led to discussions about what it means to be inclusive, such as whether it means that people with racist views should be welcome with the goal of changing their ways.

== Politics ==
The VfGH explicitly abstains from taking a political stance, arguing that political views are private matters and that the organisation should focus exclusively on religion. According to Schnurbein, the VfGH emerged at a time when younger German neopagans felt a need to distance themselves from Germany's existing neopagan groups, which were highly political and influenced by the völkisch movement. Its origin as an off-shoot from a British organisation is similar to Eldaring's origin as the German chapter of The Troth.

Within the neopagan milieu in Germany, the VfGH has been at the centre of some controversy due to far-right involvement of individual members. There has been controversy around the member Volker "Stilkam" Wagner, who has promoted the American white nationalist Stephen McNallen's concept of "folkish Asatru" (Note: The American concept folkish is not to be confused with the German völkisch movement. The former refers to neopaganism that restricts participation along racial lines. The latter was a movement that in the early 20th century included a few neopagan groups, but also ideas such as "Aryan Christianity", modern Gnostic outlooks and efforts for linguistic purism.)—a racially exclusive form of Germanic neopaganism—and translated two articles by McNallen into German. VfGH members in general view McNallen's genetical approach to paganism as too narrow. In 2006, there was a conflict between the VfGH and Eldaring, who otherwise were collaborating partners, over a VfGH member who had a past in the far-right National Democratic Party of Germany and worked for the far-right German People's Union. When Eldaring formally renounced him, the VfGH stated that it neither can nor wants to deprive members of their civil rights and accused Eldaring of defamation.

In his 2008 sociological study of Germanic neopaganism in Germany, Gründer says the VfGH has a "strong conservative orientation" and tolerance for members influenced by völkisch ideas. Schnurbein says the VfGH has promoted views that "resemble an ethno-pluralist paradigm", which would mean it has commonalities with an aspect of the German New Right, but she distinguishes it from the New Right in that it does not reject humanist and Enlightenment ideas. Steinbock's conception of paganism as a choice for modern people relies on liberal ideas about autonomous individuals, which leads him to support human rights and affirm modernity. The religious studies scholar Jörn Meyers says the VfGH emerged in the post-war context of new social movements, which tends to correlate with left-wing views but has some overlap with right-wing milieus.
