= Odinic Rite =

British and North American white supremacist organisation

- Logo of the Odinic Rite
- Formation: 1973
- Founder: John Gibbs-Bailey (known as "Hoskuld"); John Yeowell (known as "Stubba", 1918–2010)
- Founded at: England, U.K.
- Type: Religious organization
- Website: Odinic Rite

The Odinic Rite (OR) is a reconstructionist religious organisation named after the god Odin. It conceives itself as a "folkish" Heathen movement concerned with Germanic polytheism, mythology, folklore, and runes. Odinic Rite limits membership to polytheistic European individuals, holding the belief in Odinism as the ancestral religion of the Indo-European race.

== Background ==
The Odinic Rite refers to their form of Heathenry as "Odinism", a term favoured among Heathen white supremacists. In 1841, the term was used by the Scottish writer, historian, and philosopher, Thomas Carlyle in his book, On Heroes, Hero-Worship, & the Heroic in History: "Odinism was Valour; Christianism was humility, a nobler kind of Valour." It was also used by Orestes Brownson in his 1848 Letter to Protestants.

The term was re-introduced in the late 1930s by Alexander Rud Mills, an Australian fascist. Having formulated "his own unique blend" of Ariosophy, Mills drew heavily on writings of pioneering Austrian Ariosophist and Wotanist Guido von List. Much of Mills' ideology focused around what he conceived as the "British race", a group who he believed also inhabited not only Britain but other parts of the world colonised by the British Empire. That concept was particularly problematic given the ethnically and linguistically diverse nature of the British population during the early 20th century. Mills believed that while Christianity was alien to the "British race", Odinism was 'native' and thus could be better understood by them. He expressed the view that "our own racial ideas and traditions (not those of others) are our best guide to health and national strength". He was critical of Christianity, believing it to be "unnatural" because – in his view – it encouraged the breaking down of racial barriers. In Mills' theology, the Norse gods were symbols of the divine rather than actual anthropomorphic entities, and he believed that each racial group had its own symbolic system for interpreting and understanding divinity. For Mills, Odin represented an archetypal father figure, with other deities from Norse mythology, such as Thor and Frigg, having minor roles.

== History ==
In 1973 John Gibbs-Bailey (known as "Hoskuld") and John Yeowell (known as "Stubba", 1918–2010) founded the Committee for the Restoration of the Odinic Rite or Odinist Committee in England. Yeowell had been a member of the British Union of Fascists in his youth and bodyguard to leader Oswald Mosley. In 1980 the organisation changed its name to The Odinic Rite after it was believed that it had gained enough significant interest in the restoration of the Odinic faith.

In 1989 Yeowell resigned as Director of the Odinic Rite's governing body, the Court of Gothar. The Court then unanimously elected Jeffrey Holley (known as "Heimgest") as its Director and he was officially installed in this position on 23 April 1989 at the White Horse Stone in Kent. He was professed by Freya Aswynn. Prior to his involvement with the Odinic Rite Heimgest had belonged to a small group known as the Heimdal League, a closed group which disbanded in the mid-1980s.

== Beliefs ==
The Odinic Rite defines Odinism as the natural religion of the peoples of Northern Europe. It has been characterised as a white supremacist organisation and describes itself as a "folkish" group, which it states centres on a stance that includes "racial preservation and promotion", and to "have as many healthy children as is practical". It asserts that "nationality is biological, not geographical", further stating that "It is hardly possible to overestimate the damage that the destruction of racial and national identity has caused, to both people and the environment."

They only allow white members and discourage mixed-race relationships, stating that while this was not a stance taken by heathens prior to Christianisation, this is a necessary precaution in the modern age to maintain "racial integrity" and to prevent "crossed allegiances". The group further draws analogies between invasive species and immigrants, stating that the latter threaten the survival of the white population. It defines right and wrong as follows:

That which fulfils Nature, benefits the race as a servant of Nature, and benefits Odinism as a vehicle for the evolution of the race, is good; that which does not is bad. That which truly seeks and secures this good is right; that which does not is wrong.

The Odinic Rite encourages its members to live their lives according to the "Nine Noble Virtues" and the "Nine Charges". The list of noble virtues (Courage, Truth, Honour, Fidelity, Discipline, Hospitality, Self-Reliance, Industriousness, and Perseverance) is attributed to either John Yeowell (a.k.a. Stubba) and John Gibbs-Bailey (a.k.a. Hoskuld), members of Odinic Rite; or alternatively to Stephen Flowers (writing as 'Edred Thorsson'), at the time member of the Asatru Free Assembly.

While the group nominally identifies as a religious organisation that is not political, the worldviews held by the group have been identified as belonging to the extreme-right based on their racial nationalism. It is noted, however, that this terminology wouldn't necessarily be used by members of the group.

== National branches ==
The Odinic Rite expanded in the 1990s with national branches in Germany, France, and North America. The German chapter, Odinic Rite Deutschland (ORD), was formed in 1994. In its early history the ORD was heavily influenced by Bernd Hicker who was its chairman for seven years. It collaborated with the group Yggdrasil-Kreis in the 1990s; this group professed a "European religion of nature" and sought to combine Germanic and Celtic paganism.

Due to concerns about connections between the British OR and far-right politics, expressed already in 1995 in the ORD's member's magazine, as well as differing views of practice and organising, the ORD was established as an independent organisation in 2004. It changed its name to Verein für germanisches Heidentum (VfgH; lit. 'Association for Germanic paganism') in 2006.

== In popular culture ==
In 1997 the Director of Gothar, Heimgest, chanted rune names on the Sol Invictus album The Blade.

== See also ==
- Heathenry in the United Kingdom
- Heathenry in the United States
- List of magical organizations
- Modern paganism in the United Kingdom
