= Nine Noble Virtues =

Moral and situational ethical guidelines in certain groupings of Odinism and Ásatrú

The Nine Noble Virtues, NNV, or 9NV are two sets of moral and situational ethical guidelines within certain groupings of Heathens, typically those with folkish views such as Odinists and members of the Ásatrú Folk Assembly (AFA). One set was codified by John Yeowell (a.k.a. Stubba) and John Gibbs-Bailey (a.k.a. Hoskuld) of the Odinic Rite in 1974, and the other set codified by Stephen A. McNallen of the Asatru Folk Assembly in 1983. However, others believe that the earlier set, the one the Odinic Rite claim they codified, were originally put together and labelled as the Nine Noble Virtues (the “9NV”) by Edred Thorsson during his time with the original AFA. They are supposedly based on virtues found in historical Norse paganism, gleaned from various sources including the Poetic Edda (particularly the Hávamál and the Sigrdrífumál), and as evident in the Icelandic Sagas).

The Nine Charges are a different list of more explicitly phrased moral or ethical guidelines codified at about the same time. The Six-Fold Goal is yet another list of virtues, given as "Right, Wisdom, Might, Harvest, Frith and Love" by Stephen Flowers (a.k.a. Edred Thorsson) in 1989.

The Aesirian Code of Nine is also used by some practitioners of Heathenism, consisting of "honor, knowledge, protect, flourish, change, fairness, conflict, balance and control."

== Nine Noble Virtues ==
The list of "Nine Noble Virtues" is due to either John Yeowell (a.k.a. Stubba) and John Gibbs-Bailey (a.k.a. Hoskuld), members of Odinic Rite, or alternatively due to Edred Thorsson, at the time member of the Asatru Free Assembly. Stephen A. McNallen compiled a similar list under the title "Some Odinist Values" in the Asatru Folk Assembly journal The Runestone.

"Nine Noble Virtues"

1. Courage
2. Truth
3. Honour
4. Fidelity
5. Discipline
6. Hospitality
7. Self Reliance
8. Industriousness
9. Perseverance

"Some Odinist Values"

1. Strength is better than weakness
2. Courage is better than cowardice
3. Joy is better than guilt
4. Honour is better than dishonour
5. Freedom is better than slavery
6. Kinship is better than alienation
7. Realism is better than dogmatism
8. Vigor is better than lifelessness
9. Ancestry is better than rootlessness

== Nine Charges ==
The Nine Charges were codified by the Odinic Rite in the 1970s.

1. To maintain candour and fidelity in love and devotion to the tried friend: though he strike me I will do him no scathe.
2. Never to make wrongsome oath: for great and grim is the reward for the breaking of plighted troth.
3. To deal not hardly with the humble and the lowly.
4. To remember the respect that is due to great age.
5. To suffer no evil to go unremedied and to fight against the enemies of Faith, Folk and Family: my foes I will fight in the field, nor will I stay to be burnt in my house.
6. To succour the friendless but to put no faith in the pledged word of a stranger people.
7. If I hear the fool's word of a drunken man I will strive not: for many a grief and the very death groweth from out such things.
8. To give kind heed to dead people: straw dead, sea dead or sword dead.
9. To abide by the enactments of lawful authority and to bear with courage the decrees of the Norns.

== See also ==
- Nine Satanic Statements – assertions made by Anton LaVey in The Satanic Bible
- Numbers in Germanic paganism
- Seven virtues – Seven virtues in Christian tradition
- Wiccan Rede – Wicca moral statement
