= René Gründer =

German sociologist

- Born: 25.12.1975; Zittau, East Germany
- Scientific career
- Institutions: Baden-Württemberg Cooperative State University Heidenheim

René Gründer (born 1975) is a German sociologist.

== Career ==
René Gründer was born in 1975 in Zittau. He completed his doctorate at the University of Freiburg in 2010. Since 2013 he is professor of social work at the Baden-Württemberg Cooperative State University Heidenheim.

He has written about new religious movements, especially Germanic neopaganism in Germany. His approach has been to focus on the perspectives of the individual practitioners and how they combine their worldview with the modernity they live in.

== Selected publications ==
- Germanisches (Neu-)Heidentum in Deutschland. Entstehung, Struktur und Symbolsystem eines alternativreligiösen Feldes, Berlin 2008
- Der andere Glaube. Europäische Alternativreligionen zwischen heidnischer Spiritualität und christlicher Leitkultur, editor, with Michael Schetsche and Ina Schmied-Knittel, Würzburg 2009
- Blótgemeinschaften. Eine Religionsethnografie des 'germanischen Neuheidentums', Würzburg 2010
