= Odin Brotherhood =

Modern pagan group practicing Heatenry

4th edition of Mirabello's book

The Odin Brotherhood is the name of a group that practices the modern pagan religion of Heathenry. The group first gained attention when Mark Mirabello published a book which describes the group and its beliefs, The Odin Brotherhood, in 1992. A second book about the group,The Way of the Odin Brotherhood by Jack Wolf, was published in 2013.

According to Mirabello's account, the Brotherhood alleges to be the direct survivor of an ancient pre-Christian belief system. Mirabello's book has been mentioned in several publications about religions and secret societies, and the Odin Brotherhood is listed in the eighth edition of J. Gordon Melton's Encyclopedia of American Religions.

== History ==
Mark Mirabello, a professor of history at Shawnee State University, claimed he encountered the Odin Brotherhood while earning a PhD in history at Glasgow University. He once believed that the society specifically chose him to tell the world their message, but he now believes, quoting the science fiction writer Philip K. Dick, that he was “picked at random”.

Mirabello's book on the Odin Brotherhood, originally published in 1992, and now in its sixth edition, describes the eponymous group. The scholar of religion Graham Harvey subsequently stated that although he had received "enigmatic letters" from individuals claiming to be members of the group, he had been "unable to check the veracity of Mirabello's claims." Harvey noted that no other Heathens he communicated with "has any knowledge of the group beyond reading the book. Most doubt its existence". This was true even of one Heathen who was named as a contact in one of the "Brotherhood" letters. Similarly, in the Cultic Studies Review, Thomas Coghlan, a forensic psychologist with the New York Police, stated of Mirabello's book: "at first read it appears specious."

Stephen E. Atkins writes that "British Odinists claim that there has been a secret Odinist movement, the Odin Brotherhood, since 1421....Membership of the Odin Brotherhood has always remained small, but undoubtedly, some adherents made it to the American colonies and the United States."

== Beliefs and practices ==
Unlike most modern Pagan groups, which claim to be reconstructionist, the Odin Brotherhood alleges that it preserves genuine traditions of pre-Christian paganism. The group claims that it was founded in 1421: a widow was accused of practicing Odinism and burned, and a Catholic priest forced her two sons and daughter to witness the burning, those children were Christians in public, but secretly formed the group to preserve Odinism. Many groups have made claims of being many years old, and it would be really extraordinary if the group had been really founded in 1421.

The Odin Brotherhood embraces Odinism, which is defined as ancient religion that "acknowledges the gods by fostering thought, courage, honor, light, and beauty."

The Odin Brotherhood embraces polytheism. "Hard Polytheists," members believe that the gods and goddesses are distinct individual entities and not psychological archetypes or personifications of natural forces. Called the Aesir and the Vanir, the realms of these deities literally exist in the past, and when the gods and goddesses visit our world, "they are stepping forward in time."

As hard polytheists, the Odin Brotherhood believes that monotheism, "the belief in one totalitarian god, is preposterous and absurd." The Brotherhood insists that "no single, superordinary, ineffable entity controls all realities."

The brotherhood has no buildings (temples or churches) but attempts to honor the gods everywhere, as long as outsiders are excluded; all words are "whispered," and all "abominations" are avoided. The central rite of the brotherhood is called the "Glimpse-Of-Extraordinary-Beauty," during which the celebrants believe they are "enveloped and penetrated by the thoughts of a god".

The brotherhood believes in life after death and that there are three "Other-Worlds," one of which is called Valhalla or the White-Kingdom. Not a paradise, Valhalla is a place of honor for heroes. The existence of the Christian hell is denied.

Melton has written that, "The brotherhood has distanced itself from the racism that has infected Norse beliefs in the twentieth century and eschews the idea that there are either chosen peoples or master races".

From the beginning, the Odin Brotherhood has included women in its membership.

== See also ==
- Polytheism
- Secret society
