= Heathenry (new religious movement) =

Modern pagan religion

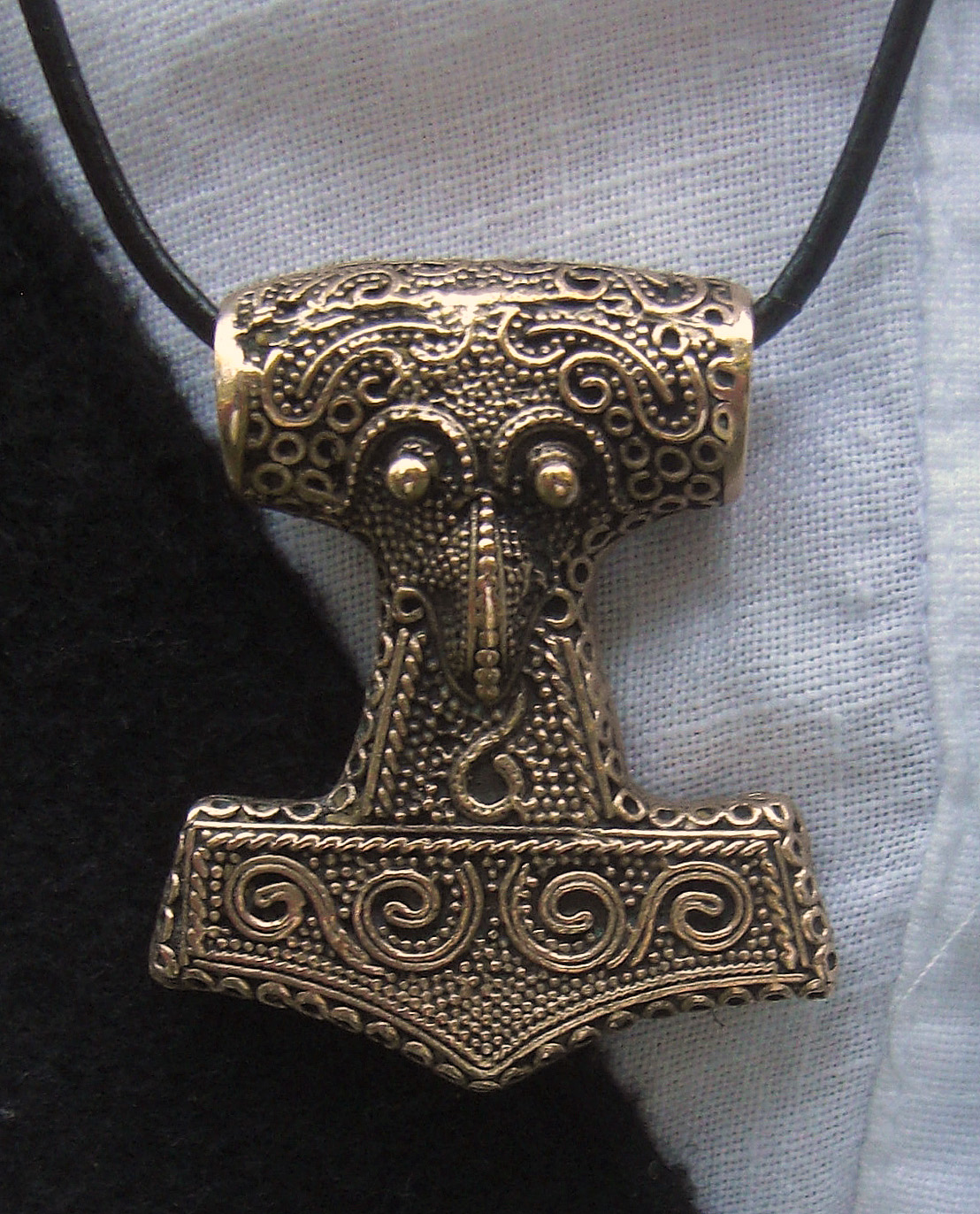
A modern replica of a Viking Age pendant representing Mjölnir, the hammer of the god Thor; such pendants are often worn by Heathens.

Heathenry, also termed Heathenism, contemporary Germanic Paganism, or Germanic Neopaganism, is a modern pagan religion. Scholars of religious studies classify it as a new religious movement. Developed in Europe during the early 20th century, its practitioners model it on the pre-Christian religions adhered to by the Germanic peoples of the Iron Age and Early Middle Ages. In an attempt to reconstruct these past belief systems, Heathenry uses surviving historical, archaeological, and folkloric evidence as a basis, although approaches to this material vary considerably.

Heathenry does not have a unified theology but is typically polytheistic, centering on a pantheon of deities from pre-Christian Germanic Europe. It adopts cosmological views from these past societies, including an animistic view of the cosmos in which the natural world is imbued with spirits. The religion's deities and spirits are honored in sacrificial rites known as blóts in which food and libations are offered to them. These are often accompanied by symbel, the act of ceremonially toasting the gods with an alcoholic beverage. Some adherents also engage in rituals designed to induce an altered state of consciousness and visions, most notably seiðr and galdr, with the intent of gaining wisdom and advice from the deities. Many solitary adherents follow the religion by themselves. Other Heathens assemble in small groups, usually known as kindreds or hearths, to perform their rites outdoors or in specially constructed buildings. Heathen ethical systems emphasize honor, personal integrity, and loyalty, while beliefs about an afterlife vary and are rarely emphasized.

Heathenry's origins lie in the 19th- and early 20th-century Romanticism which glorified the pre-Christian societies of Germanic Europe. Völkisch groups actively venerating the deities of these societies appeared in Germany and Austria during the 1900s and 1910s, although they largely dissolved following Nazi Germany's defeat in World War II. In the 1970s, new Heathen groups were established in Europe and North America, developing into formalized organizations. A central division within the Heathen movement emerged surrounding race. Older groups adopted a racialist attitude—often termed "folkish" within the community—by viewing Heathenry as an ethnic or racial religion with inherent links to a Germanic race. They believe it should be reserved for white people, particularly of northern European descent, and often combine the religion with far right-wing and white supremacist perspectives. A larger proportion of Heathens instead adopt a "universalist" perspective, holding that the religion is open to all, irrespective of ethnic or racial background.

While the term Heathenry is used widely to describe the religion as a whole, many groups prefer different designations, influenced by their regional focus and ideological preferences. Heathens focusing on Scandinavian sources sometimes use Ásatrú, Vanatrú, or Forn Sed; practitioners focusing on Anglo-Saxon traditions use Fyrnsidu or Theodism; those emphasising German traditions use Irminism; and those Heathens who espouse folkish and far-right perspectives tend to favor the terms Odinism, Wotanism, or Wodenism. Scholarly estimates put the number of Heathens at no more than 20,000 worldwide, with communities of practitioners active in Europe, the Americas, Australasia, and Israel.

== Definition ==
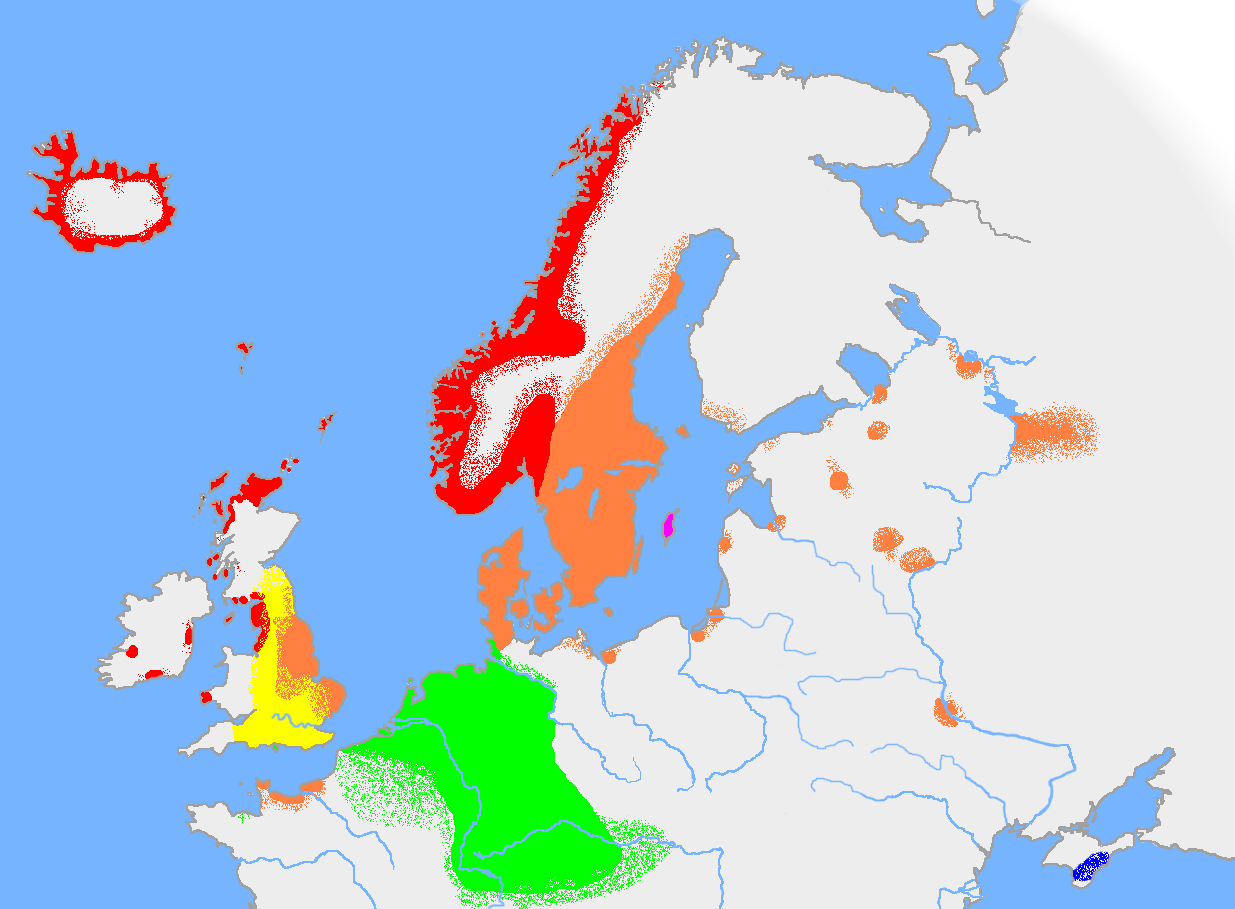
Map depicting the extent of the various Germanic languages in the 10th century, during the Early Middle Ages. Heathens are inspired by the pre-Christian religions of these Germanic societies.

Scholars of religion classify Heathenry as a new religious movement, and more specifically as a reconstructionist form of modern Paganism. Heathenry has been defined as "a broad contemporary Pagan new religious movement (NRM) that is consciously inspired by the linguistically, culturally, and (in some definitions) ethnically 'Germanic' societies of Iron Age and early medieval Europe as they existed prior to Christianization".

Practitioners seek to revive these pre-Christian systems using historical source materials. Among the sources used are Icelandic Old Norse texts such as the Prose Edda and Poetic Edda, Old English works like Beowulf, and Middle High German writings such as the Nibelungenlied. Some Heathens also draw on archaeological evidence and folklore from later periods. Many Heathens call this material the "Lore" and emphasise its study. These textual sources nevertheless pose issues for "reconstructing" pre-Christian religion because they were written by Christians and discuss pre-Christian traditions in a fragmentary, biased manner. The anthropologist Jenny Blain characterises Heathenry as "a religion constructed from partial material", while the religious studies scholar Michael Strmiska describes Heathen beliefs as being "riddled with uncertainty and historical confusion".

The ways that Heathens use historical and archaeological sources differ. Some seek to reconstruct past beliefs and practices as accurately as possible; others experiment and embrace innovation. The latter may adapt their practices according to unverified personal gnosis (UPG) gained through spiritual experiences, or draw influence from surviving polytheistic religions, such as Hinduism and Afro-American religions, to construct worldviews they believe are closer to those of pre-Christian Europe. Some practitioners critical of these approaches dismiss this eclecticism with the pejorative term "Neo-Heathen".

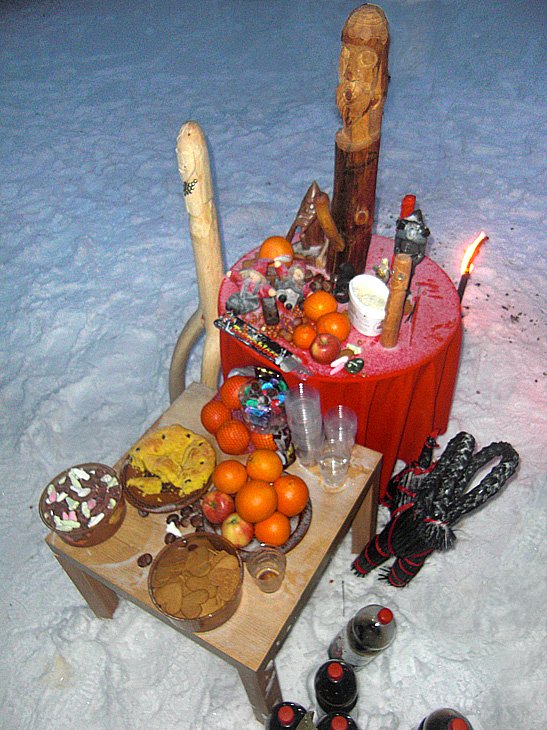
Outdoor altar to mark Yule 2010, set up by the Swedish Forn Sed Assembly in Gothenburg, Västergötland

While certain Heathens utilise elements that were common across the Germanic speaking world during the Iron Age and Early Middle Ages, others focus on specific geographical or chronological areas of Germanic Europe, such as Anglo-Saxon England or Viking Age Iceland. Some adherents are deeply knowledgeable as to the specifics of Iron Age and early medieval northern Europe, but most are influenced more by fictional literature and popular accounts of Norse mythology. Many Heathens romanticise this past, with the sociologist of religion Jennifer Snook observing that practitioners often "hearken back to a more epic, anachronistic, and pure age of ancestors and heroes".

The scholar of religion Fredrik Gregorius noted that "no real continuity" exists between the pre-Christian religions of Germanic peoples and modern Heathenry. Similarly, the anthropologist Murphy Pizza characterised Heathenry as an "invented tradition". In contrast, Heathens often dislike the characterisation of their tradition as a "new religion", or a form of "reconstructionism". Instead, Heathens commonly prefer to call it a "traditional faith", or alternatively an "indigenous religion" with parallels to the religions of the world's indigenous peoples. In identifying with indigeneity, some Heathens present themselves as the victims of medieval Christian colonialism and imperialism. A 2015 survey of Heathens found that 36% thought Heathenry a direct continuation of pre-Christian religions, while another 36% deemed it a reconstruction; 22% acknowledged it as modern but historically inspired, although this was the dominant interpretation among Heathens in Nordic countries.

=== Terminology ===
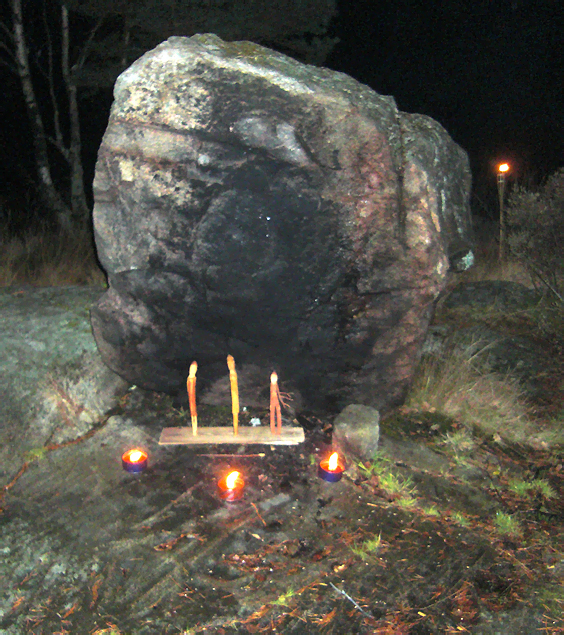
An álfablót ritual held at Getsjön in Västergötland, Sweden, in 2009

No central authority exists to impose a particular terminological designation on all Heathens. Hence, different groups use different words for their religion and themselves, with these terms often indicating their socio-political beliefs and the region of pre-Christian Germanic Europe from which they draw inspiration.

Academics studying the religion have typically favoured the terms Heathenry and Heathenism, names that are inclusive of all varieties of the movement. This term is the most common option among practitioners in the United Kingdom, with growing usage elsewhere. These terms are based on the word heathen, attested as the Gothic haithn, which was adopted by Gothic Arian missionaries as the equivalent of both the Greek words Hellenis (Hellene, Greek) and ethnikós—"of a (foreign) people". The word was used for non-Christians by early medieval Christian writers, with modern Heathens reappropriating it as a self-designation. Many practitioners favor Heathen over pagan because the former term originated among Germanic languages, whereas pagan originated in Latin.

Another synonym used in an academic context is contemporary Germanic Paganism; an alternative is Germanic Neopaganism, although the latter was developed by scholars and is little used by Heathens. Additional proposals are Modern Nordic Paganism, although this would only encompass Heathens focusing on the religions of Old Norse speakers, and North European Paganism, although this term also implies influence from Northern European groups who spoke non-Germanic languages. Other terms used within the community are the Northern Tradition, Norse Paganism, and Saxon Paganism, while in the early 20th century, commonly used terms were German, Nordic, or Germanic Faith.

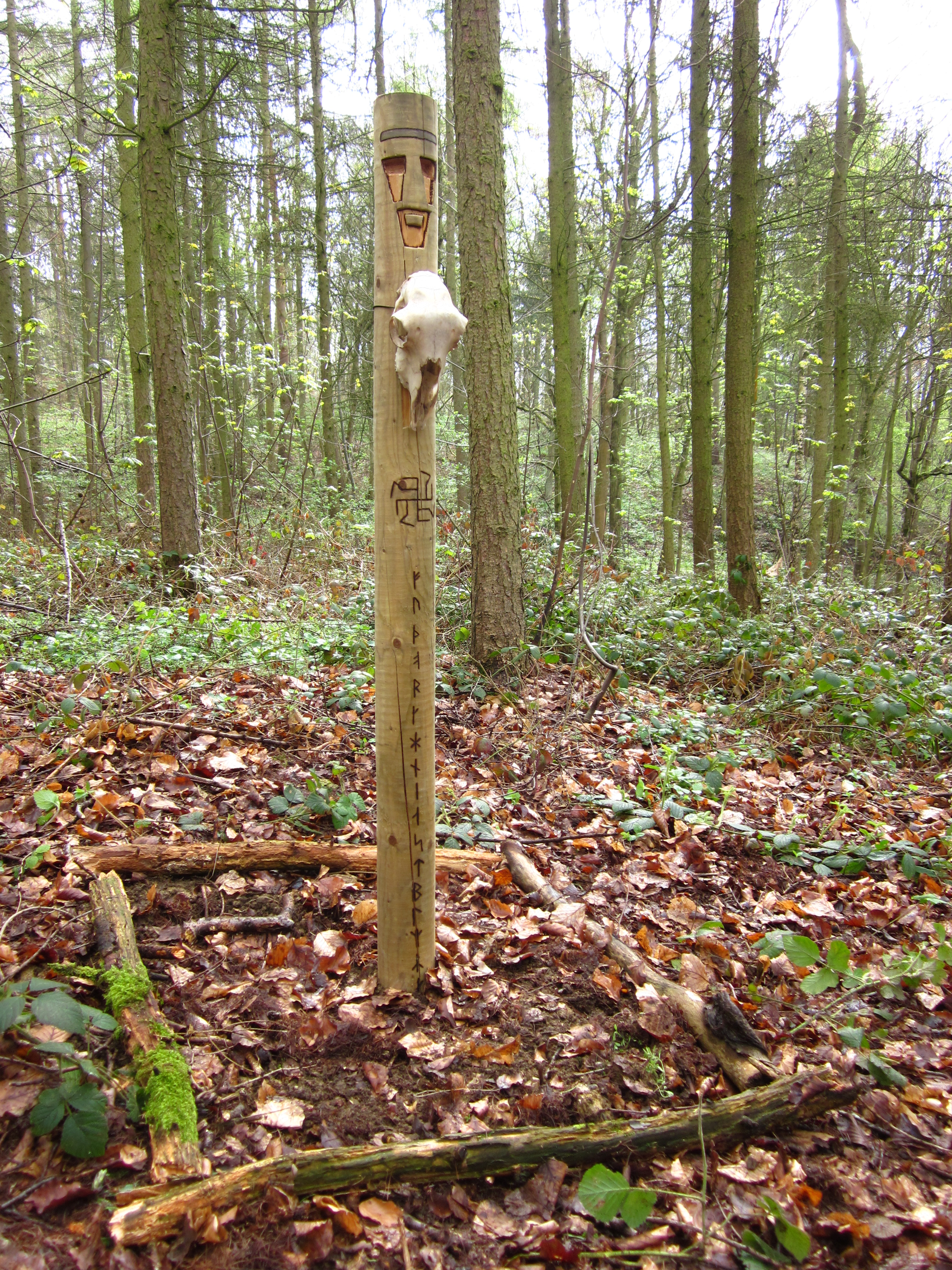
Heathen ritual space marked out by an engraved wooden pillar, located on The Wrekin in Shropshire, England

A further name for the religion is the Icelandic Ásatrú, which translates as "Æsir belief" or "loyalty to the Æsir"—the Æsir being a sub-set of deities in Norse mythology. This is more commonly rendered as Asatru in English, with practitioners being known as Asatruar. This term is favored by practitioners who focus on Scandinavian deities, although its popularity has waned as the religion has aged. The term has also been criticised as misleading, for many self-identified Asatruar engage with supernatural entities in addition to the Æsir, such as the Vanir, valkyries, elves, and dwarfs.

In Scandinavia, a common term since the 2000s has been Forn Siðr or Forn Sed ("the old way"); this is also a term reappropriated from Christian usage, having previously been a derogatory label for pre-Christian religion in the Old Norse Heimskringla. Some terms indicate a particular geographical focus; in the United States, German-oriented groups have adopted Irminism while their counterparts focusing on Anglo-Saxon sources have employed Fyrnsidu or Theodism. Chosen terms may also allude to a particular theological focus; Vanatrú refers to "those who honor the Vanir", Dísitrú means "those who honor the goddesses", and Rokkatru is favored by those centring the Jötnar.

Racialist-oriented Heathens often prefer the terms Odinism, Wotanism, or Wodenism. Although there is a general view that Odinism is used by those embracing a racialised approach and Asatru is favoured by more moderate groups, no clear division of these terms' usage exists in practice. There is, for instance, one British group, Odinshof, who call their activities Odinism despite being non-racially oriented; they use it in reference to their particular dedication to the god Odin. Conversely, many self-described Odinist groups do not place particular focus on Odin.

== Beliefs ==
=== Gods and spirits ===
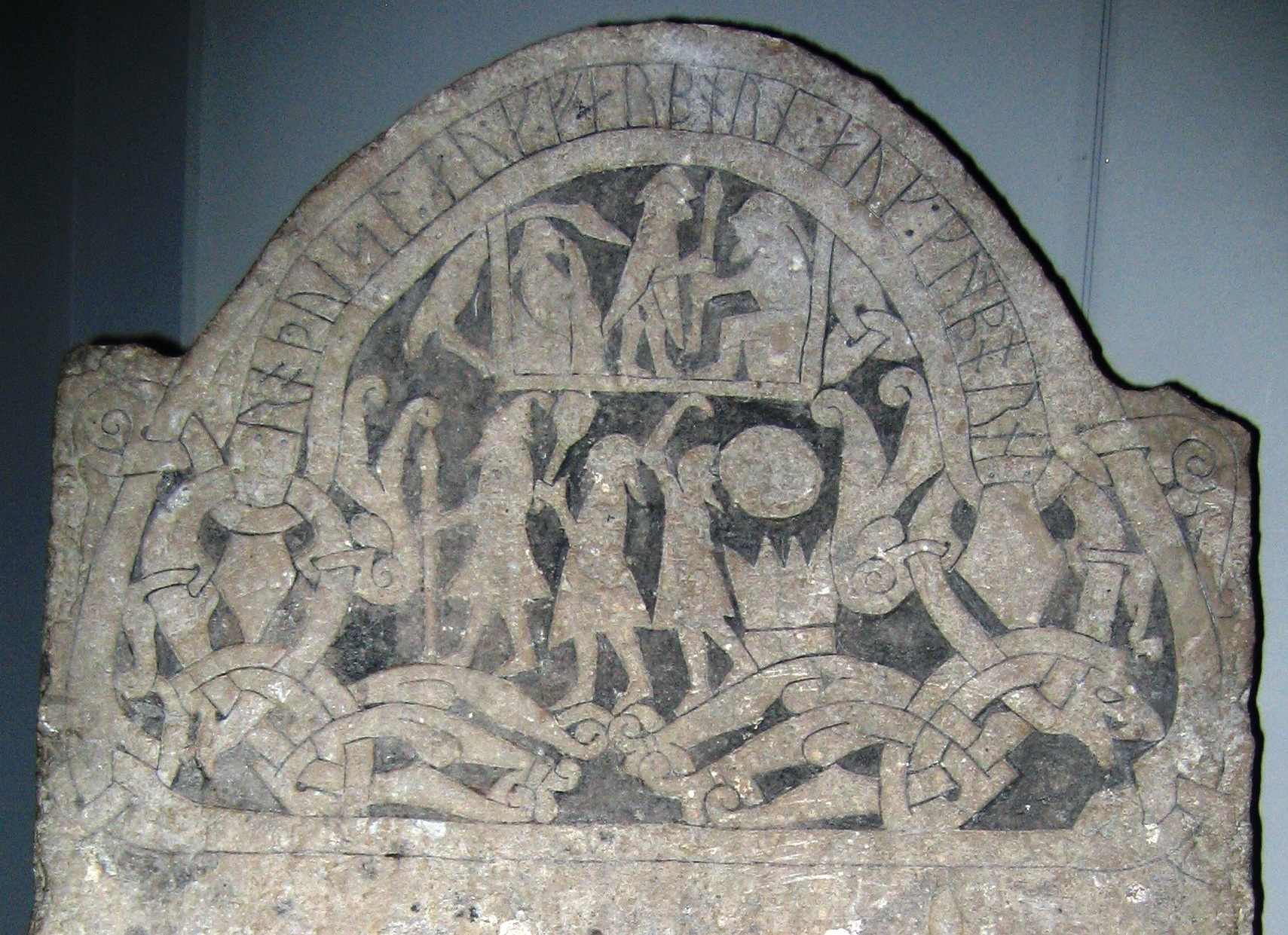
A detail from Gotland runestone G 181, in the Swedish Museum of National Antiquities in Stockholm. The three figures are interpreted as Odin, Thor, and Freyr, deities which have seen their veneration revived among modern Heathens.

The historian of religion Mattias Gardell said that there is "no unanimously accepted theology" within Heathenry. Finding the polytheistic nature of pre-Christian religion embarrassing, some early Heathens like Guido von List claimed that it had actually been monotheistic. Since the 1970s, such negative attitudes towards polytheism have changed. Today Heathenry is usually polytheistic, exhibiting a pantheon of gods and goddesses, with adherents offering their allegiance and worship to some or all of them. Most practitioners are polytheistic realists, calling themselves "hard" or "true polytheists" and believing in the literal existence of the deities as individual entities. Others express a psychological interpretation of the divinities, viewing them for instance as symbols, Jungian archetypes or racial archetypes, with some who adopt this position deeming themselves to be atheists.

Heathenry's deities come from the pre-Christian religions of Germanic Europe; they include divinities like Týr, Odin, Thor, Frigg and Freyja from Scandinavian sources, Wōden, Thunor and Ēostre from Anglo-Saxon sources, and figures such as Nehalennia from continental sources. Some practitioners adopt the belief from Norse mythology that there are two sets of deities, the Æsir and the Vanir. Certain practitioners blend the different regions and times together, for instance, using a mix of Old English and Old Norse names for the deities, while others keep them separate and only venerate deities from a particular region. Some groups focus on a particular deity; for instance, the Brotherhood of Wolves, a Czech Heathen group, centers on the deity Fenrir. Many practitioners adopt a patron deity for themselves, taking an oath of dedication to them known as fulltrúi; they may describe themselves as that entity's devotee using terms such as Thorsman or Odinsman.

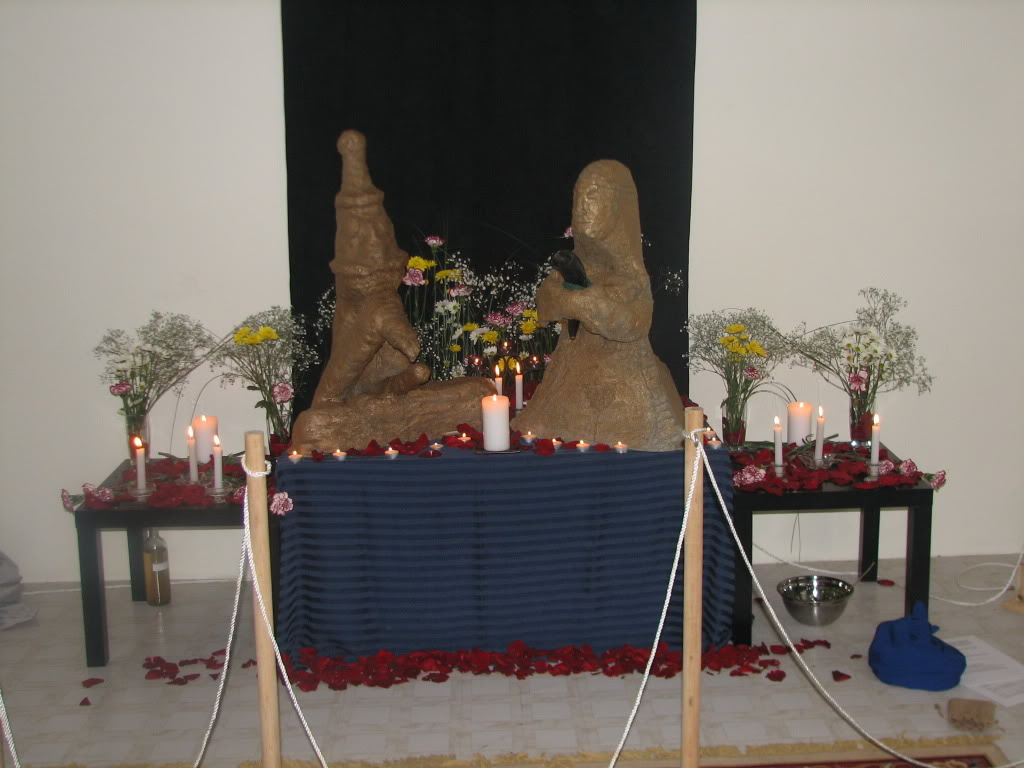
Images of the deities Frey and Freyja constructed by the Rúnatýr Kindred in Canada in 2011

Heathen deities are not seen as perfect, omnipotent, or omnipresent, and are instead viewed as having their own strengths and weaknesses. Many practitioners believe that these deities will one day die, as did, for instance, the god Baldr in Norse mythology. Heathens view their connection with their deities not as being that of a master and servant but rather as an interdependent relationship akin to that of a family. For them, these deities serve as role models whose behavior is to be imitated. Many practitioners believe that they can communicate with these deities, as well as negotiate, bargain, and argue with them; they hope that through venerating them, practitioners will gain wisdom, understanding, power, or visionary insights. In Heathen ritual, deities are typically represented as godpoles - wooden shafts with anthropomorphic faces carved into them, as were used prior to Christianization, although in other instances resin statues of the divinities are sometimes used.

Many Heathens combine their polytheistic world-view with a pantheistic conception of the natural world as being sacred and imbued with a divine energy force permeating all life. Many Heathens also believe in and respect ancestral spirits, with ancestral veneration representing an important part of their religious practice. For Heathens, relationships with the ancestors are seen as grounding their own sense of identity and giving them strength from the past.

Heathenry is animistic, with practitioners believing in nonhuman spirit persons commonly known as "wights" (vættir) that inhabit the world, each having its own personality. Some of these are known as "land spirits" (landvættir) and inhabit different aspects of the landscape, living alongside humans, whom they can both help and hinder. Others are household deities and can be propitiated with offerings of food. Some Heathens interact with these entities and provide offerings to them more often than they do with the gods and goddesses. Wights are often identified with various creatures from northwestern European folklore such as elves, dwarves, gnomes, and trolls. Some of these entities—such as the Jötunn of Norse mythology—are deemed to be baleful spirits; within the community it is often deemed taboo to provide offerings to them, however some practitioners still do so.

=== Cosmology and afterlife ===
Heathens commonly adopt a cosmology based on that from Norse mythology. In this framework, humanity's world, Midgard, is regarded as one of Nine Worlds, all associated with a cosmological world tree, Yggdrasil. Different beings, such as humans, dwarfs, elves, jötnar, and the gods, inhabit separate realms. Most practitioners deem this a poetic or symbolic description of the cosmos, with the different levels representing realms beyond the material plane of existence. The world tree is sometimes also interpreted as an icon for ecological and social engagement. Some Heathens, such as the psychologist Brian Bates, have adopted an approach to this cosmology rooted in analytical psychology, thereby interpreting the nine worlds and their inhabitants as maps of the human mind.

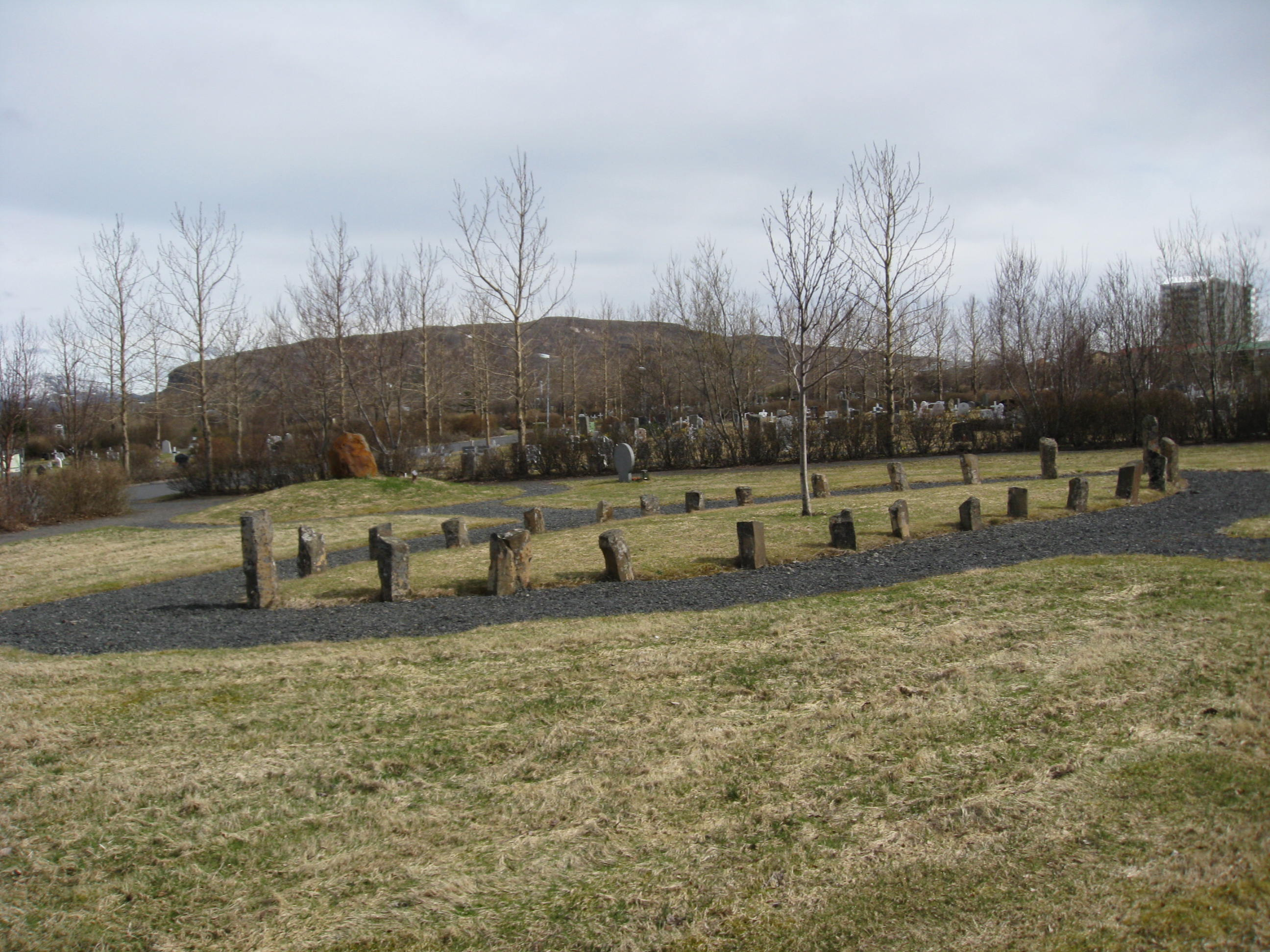
Heathen cemetery in Gufuneskirkjugarður, Reykjavík, which was established in 1999

According to a common Heathen belief based on references in Old Norse sources, three female entities known as the Norns sit at the end of the world tree's root. These figures spin wyrd, which refers to the actions and interrelationships of all beings throughout the cosmos. In the community, these three figures are sometimes termed "Past, Present and Future", "Being, Becoming, and Obligation" or "Initiation, Becoming, Unfolding". It is believed that an individual can navigate through the wyrd, and thus, the Heathen worldview oscillates between concepts of free will and fatalism. Heathens also believe in a personal form of wyrd known as örlög. This is connected to an emphasis on luck, with Heathens in North America often believing that luck can be earned, passed down through the generations, or lost.

Various Heathen groups adopt the Norse apocalyptic myth of Ragnarök; few view it as a literal prophecy of future events. Instead, it is often treated as a symbolic warning of the danger that humanity faces if it acts unwisely in relation to both itself and the natural world. The death of the gods at Ragnarök is often viewed as a reminder of the inevitability of death and the importance of living honorably and with integrity until one dies. Alternately, ethno-nationalist Heathens have interpreted Ragnarök as a prophecy of a coming apocalypse in which the white race will overthrow those whom these Heathens perceive as their oppressors and establish a future society based on Heathen religion. The political scientist Jeffrey Kaplan believed that it was the "strongly millenarian and chiliastic overtones" of Ragnarök which helped convert white American racialists to the right wing of the Heathen movement.

Some practitioners do not emphasize belief in an afterlife, instead stressing the importance of behaviour and reputation in this world. In Icelandic Heathenry, there is no singular dogmatic belief about the afterlife. A common Heathen belief is that a human being has multiple souls, which are separate yet linked together. It is common to find a belief in four or five souls, two of which survive bodily death: one of these, the hugr, travels to the realm of the ancestors, while the other, the fetch, undergoes a process of reincarnation into a new body. In Heathen belief, there are various realms that the hugr can enter, based in part on the worth of the individual's earthly life; these include the hall of Valhalla, ruled over by Odin, or Sessrúmnir, the hall of Freyja. Beliefs regarding reincarnation vary widely among Heathens, although one common belief is that individuals are reborn within their family or clan.

=== Morality and ethics ===
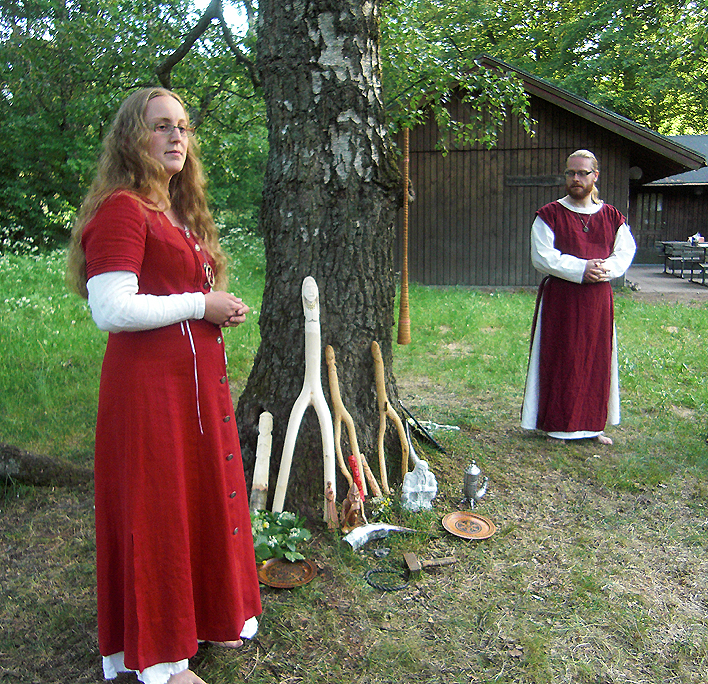
A 2011 Heathen blót in Humlamaden near Veberöd in Lund, Sweden

Heathen ethical views are based on the perceived ethics of Iron Age and early medieval northwestern Europe, particularly the actions of heroic figures in Old Norse sagas. Evoking a life-affirming ethos, Heathen ethics focus on honor, courage, integrity, hospitality, hard work, and family loyalty. It is common for practitioners to be expected to keep their word, particularly sworn oaths. There is a strong individualism focused around personal responsibility, with a common Heathen motto being: "We are our deeds". Most Heathens reject the concept of sin and believe that guilt is a destructive concept.

Some Heathen communities have formalized such values into an ethical code, the Nine Noble Virtues (NNV), which is based largely on the Hávamál from the Poetic Edda. This was developed by the founders of the UK-based Odinic Rite in the 1970s, although then spread internationally, with 77% of respondents to a 2015 Heathen survey reporting its use in some form. There are different forms of the NNV, with the number nine having symbolic associations in Norse mythology. Opinion is divided on the NNV; some practitioners deem them too dogmatic, while others eschew them for lacking authentic roots in historical Germanic culture, negatively viewing them as an attempt to imitate the Ten Commandments. Their use is particularly unpopular in Nordic countries, and has been observed declining in the United States.

The 2015 survey of Heathens found that a greater percentage of practitioners opposed traditional gender roles than supported them; this was particularly the case in northern Europe. However, in the United States, Heathen gender roles often draw on the perceived norms of early medieval northwestern Europe, especially as presented in Old Norse sources. Male American Heathens display a trend toward hypermasculinized behaviour, while a gendered division of labor—in which men are viewed as providers and women seen as being responsible for home and children—is also widespread among American Heathens. Due to its focus on traditional attitudes to sex and gender—values perceived as socially conservative in Western nations—it has been said that American Heathenry's ethical system is far closer to traditional Christian morals than the ethical systems espoused in many other Western Pagan religions such as Wicca.

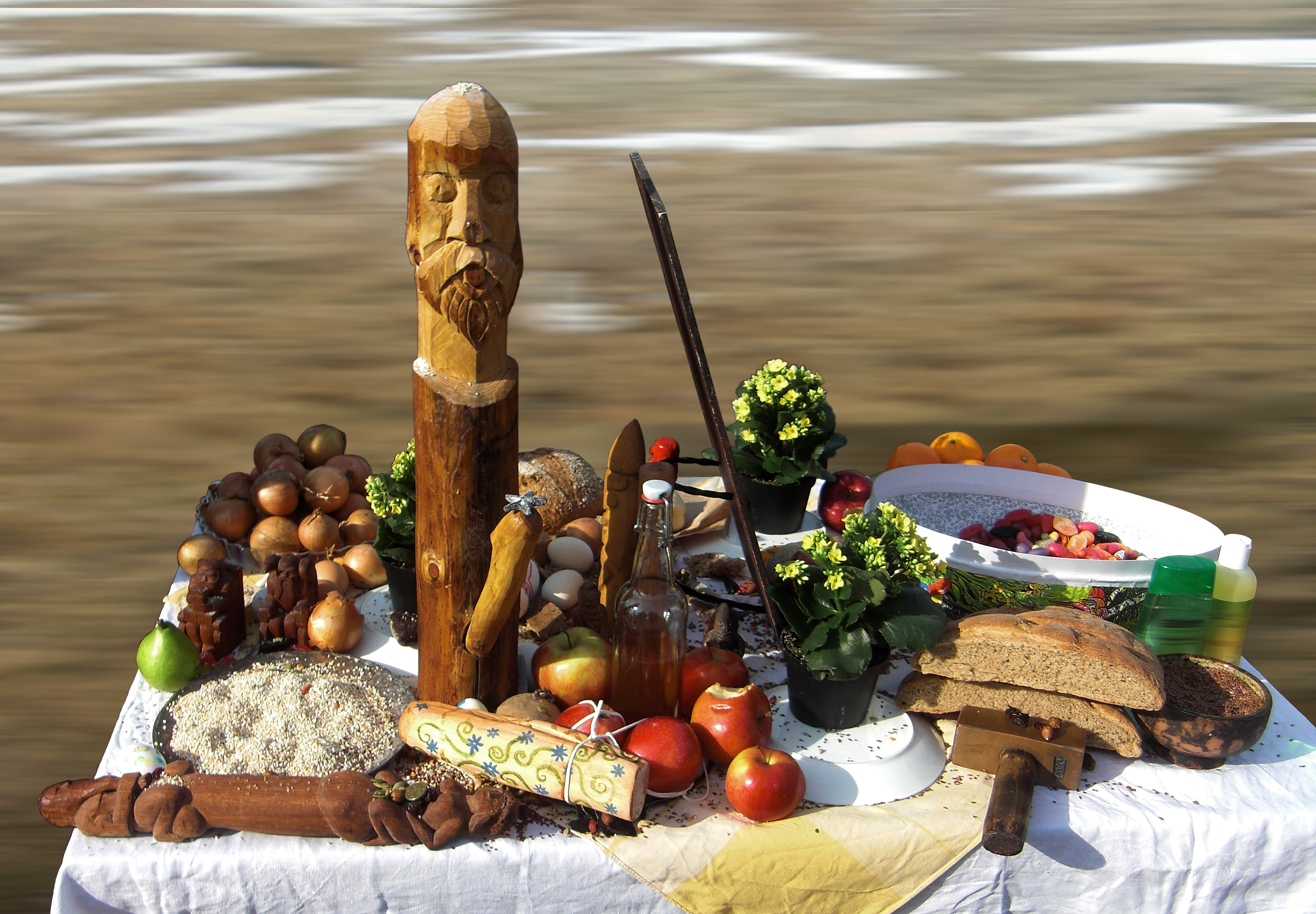
A 2010 outdoor altar at the Springblót at Gamla Uppsala, Uppland, Sweden

The sociologist Jennifer Snook said that, as with all religions, Heathenry is "intimately connected" to politics, with practitioners' political and religious beliefs influencing one another. As a result of the religion's emphasis on honoring the land and its wights, many Heathens take an interest in ecological issues, with many considering Heathenry a nature religion. Heathens have participated in tree planting, raised money to purchase woodland, and campaigned against railway developments. Many practitioners are also concerned with the preservation of heritage sites, sometimes criticising archaeological excavation of prehistoric and early medieval burials, believing that this disrespects the interred dead, whom Heathens often perceive as ancestors.

Internal ethical debates arise within the community over perceptions of decorum. For instance, many Heathens eschew worship of the Norse god Loki, deeming him a baleful wight, but his gender-bending nature has made him attractive to many LGBT Heathens. Adherents of the former perspective have thus criticized Lokeans as effeminate and sexually deviant. Views on homosexuality and LGBT rights remain a source of tension within Heathenry. Some Heathens view homosexuality as being incompatible with a family-oriented ethos and thus censure same-sex sexual activity. Others legitimize openness toward LGBT practitioners by reference to the gender-bending actions of Thor and Odin in Norse mythology. There are homosexual and transgender Heathens, many Northern European Heathen groups perform same-sex marriages, and Heathens have marched carrying a statue of the god Freyr in the Stockholm Pride parade.

== Rites and practices ==
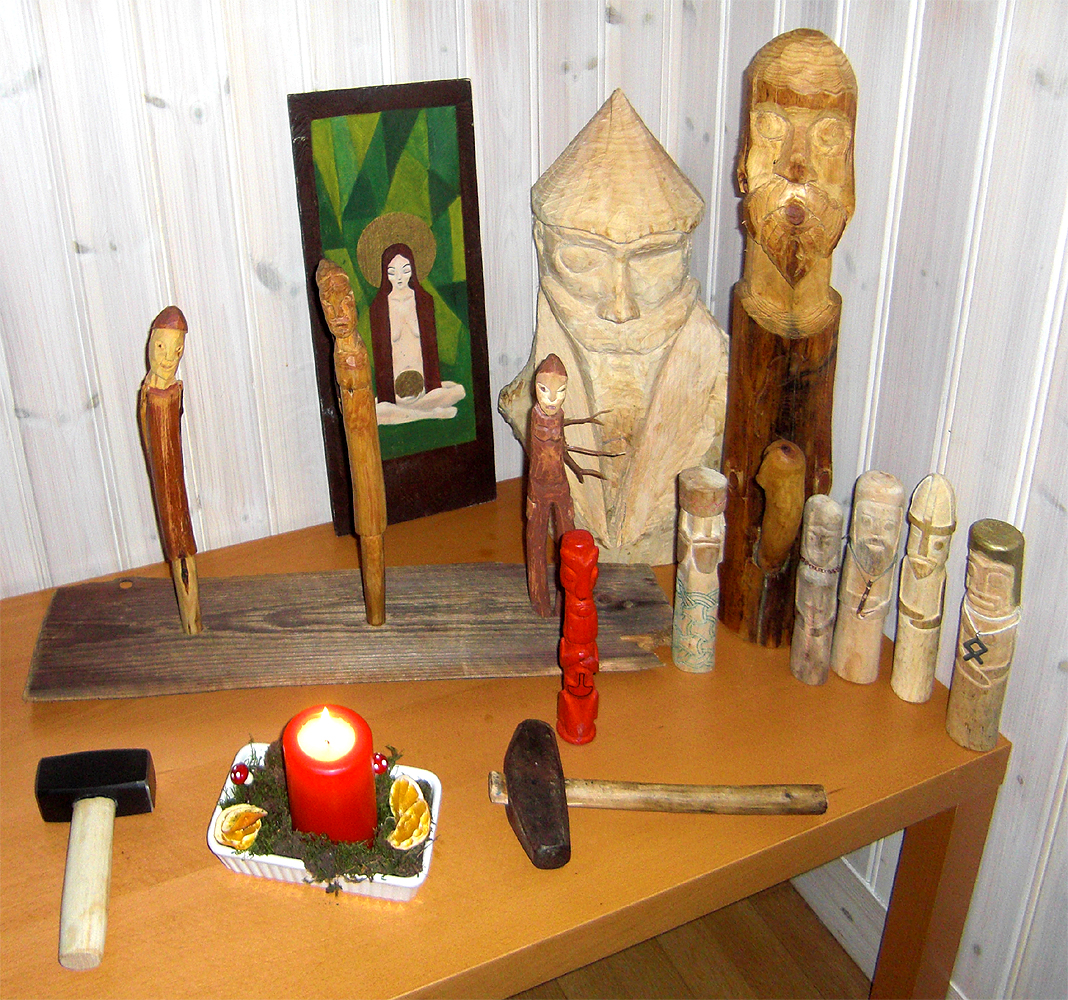
A Heathen altar for the Yule feast in Gothenburg, Sweden. The painted tablet at the back depicts Sunna, the two larger wooden idols Odin (left) and Frey (right). In front of them there are the three Norns, and in the front row a red Thor and other idols. In front of the cult images are two ritual hammers.

Heathen groups are varyingly called kindreds, hearths, fellowships, tribes, or garths. These are small groups, often family units, that typically contain between five and fifteen members, all bound together by oaths of loyalty. Screening procedures regulate the admittance of new members, who may undergo a probationary period before they are fully accepted into the group; others remain closed to all new members. Heathen kindreds are largely autonomous, although typically network with other Heathen groups, particularly in their region. Other Heathens are unaffiliated with groups, operating as solitary practitioners, but sometimes communicate with other Heathens through social media. A 2015 survey found that globally, most Heathens were solitary practitioners, although in northern Europe most practitioners were involved in groups.

Priests are often termed godhi, while priestesses are gydhja, Old Norse terms meaning "god-man" and "god-woman" respectively, with the plural term being gothar. These individuals are rarely seen as intermediaries between practitioners and deities, but instead facilitate and lead group ceremonies and are deemed learned in the religion's lore and traditions. Many kindreds believe that anyone can take on the position of priest, with members sharing organisational duties and taking turns in leading the rites. Other groups consider it necessary for an individual to gain formal credentials from an accredited Heathen organisation before becoming a priest. In a few groups—particularly those of the early 20th century which operated as secret societies—the priesthood is modelled on an initiatory system of ascending degrees akin to Freemasonry.

Heathen rites often take place in non-public spaces, particularly practitioners' homes. Other Heathens have purchased plots of land for the purpose; these can represent either a hörg, which is a sanctified place within nature like a grove of trees, or a hof, which is a wooden temple. Heathens have built hofs in several parts of the world; in 2014 the Ásaheimur Temple was opened in Efri Ás, Skagafjörður, Iceland, while in 2014 a British group called the Odinist Fellowship opened a temple in a converted 16th-century chapel in Newark, Nottinghamshire. Heathens also adopt archaeological sites as places of worship. For instance, British practitioners have performed rituals at the Nine Ladies stone circle in Derbyshire, the Rollright Stones in Warwickshire, and the White Horse Stone in Kent. Swedish Heathens have done the same at Gamla Uppsala and Icelandic Heathens at Þingvellir.

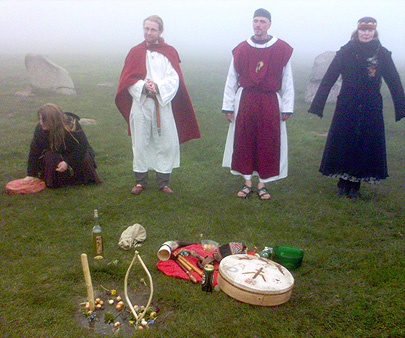
The Swedish Asatru Society holding a 2008 blót near to Österlen in Scania

Heathen communal rituals mark rites of passage, seasonal observances, and oath takings, or are performed for a specific deity or to cater to a specific need. Strmiska said that in Iceland, Heathen rituals had been deliberately constructed in an attempt to recreate or pay tribute to the ritual practices of pre-Christian Icelanders, although there was also space in which these rituals could reflect innovation, changing in order to suit the tastes and needs of contemporary practitioners. In addition to their communal rituals, many kindreds also organize study sessions to discuss medieval texts pertaining to pre-Christian religion; American Heathens commonly call Heathenry a "religion with homework".

During rituals, many adherents wear clothing resembling the styles of dress worn in Iron Age and early medieval northern Europe, sometimes termed "garb". They also often wear symbols indicating their religious allegiance. The most commonly used sign among Heathens is Mjölnir, or Thor's hammer, which is worn as a pendant, featured in Heathen art, and used as a gesture in ritual. It sometimes expresses a particular affinity with the god Thor, although is also used as a symbol of Heathen identity more widely. Another common Heathen symbol is the valknut, used to represent the god Odin or Woden. Practitioners often decorate their material—and sometimes themselves, in the form of tattoos—with runes, the alphabet used by early medieval Germanic languages.

=== Blót and sumbel ===
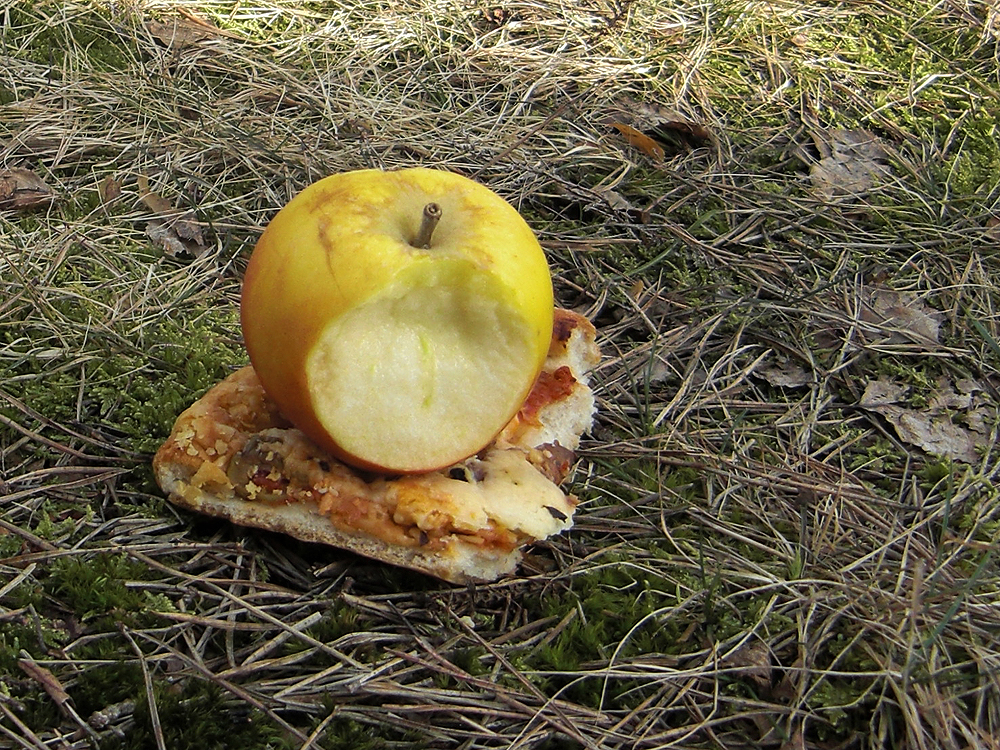
An apple and a slice of home-made pizza given as blót offerings in Gothenburg, Sweden

The most important Heathen rite, blót, involves giving offerings to the gods. Typically taking place outdoors, blót usually consists of an offering of a bowl of mead. The gods are invoked and requests expressed for their aid; the priest uses a sprig or evergreen branch to sprinkle mead onto deity statues and the assembled participants. Finally, the mead is poured onto a fire or the earth as a libation to the gods. A communal meal may then be held. These communal acts also serve as a form of group bonding. In other instances, the blót is simpler, involving setting food aside, sometimes without words, for gods or wights. Some Heathens give offerings daily, others more occasionally.

In Iron Age and early medieval northern Europe, the term blót sometimes applied to animal sacrifices performed for the deities. Most Heathens do not practice animal sacrifice, deeming it impractical or altogether repudiating it; the Icelandic group Ásatrúarfélagið for instance explicitly rejects the practice. In the U.S., a small number of Heathens have been sacrificing animals since at least the 2000s. They regard the sacrificed animal as a gift to the deities and sometimes a "traveller" taking a message to these beings. Groups performing these sacrifices typically follow the procedure outlined in the Heimskringla: the animal's throat is cut with a sharp knife and its blood collected in a bowl before being sprinkled onto participants and statues of the gods. Animals used have included poultry, sheep, and pigs, with the meat then being consumed by the rite's participants.

Another common Heathen ritual is sumbel, also spelled symbel, a drinking ceremony to toast the gods. Sumbel often takes place after a blót. The sumbel commonly involves a drinking horn being filled with mead and passed among participants, who drink from it directly or pour some into their own drinking vessels. During this process, toasts and tributes are made to gods, heroes, and ancestors. Then, oaths and boasts (promises of future actions) might be offered, both of which are considered binding due to the sacred context of the ceremony. Sumbel has a social rule in building new relationships and cementing bonds between Heathens. The rite may also be adapted, for instance with apple juice used in place of alcohol if children are involved.

=== Seiðr and galdr ===
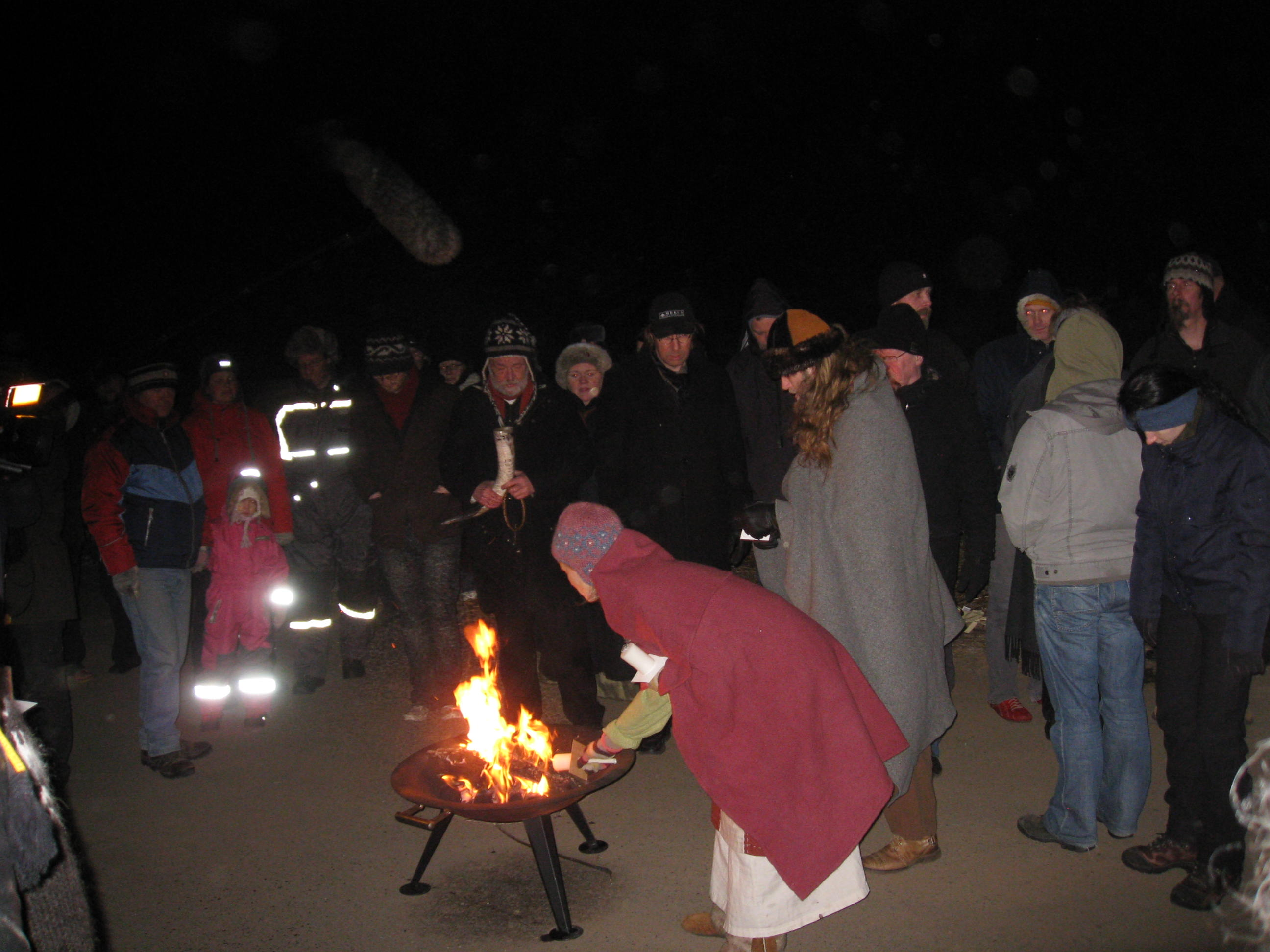
A Jólablót held on Iceland in 2009 by members of Ásatrúarfélagið

Another Heathen practice is seiðr, in which practitioners enter a state of trance. Seiðr is sometimes labelled "shamanic", although the appropriateness of this description is debated. Contemporary seiðr developed in the 1990s out of the wider Neo-Shamanic movement, in some cases influenced by trance-states from other religions, like Umbanda.

A prominent form is high-seat or oracular seiðr, which draws on the account of Guðriðr in Eiríks saga. Oracular seiðr typically involves a seiðr-worker sitting on a high seat while songs and chants are performed to invoke gods and wights. Drumming then induces an altered state of consciousness in the seiðr-worker, who goes on a meditative journey in which they visualise travelling through the world tree to the realm of Hel. The assembled audience then provide questions for the seiðr-worker, with the latter replying based on information obtained in their trance-state. Some seiðr-practitioners make use of entheogenic substances; others explicitly oppose the use of mind-altering drugs.

Many conservative Heathens disapprove of seiðr given its associations with both sexual and gender ambiguity and with the gods Odin and Loki in their unreliable trickster forms. Although there are heterosexual male seiðr-workers, seiðr is largely associated with women and gay men, and a 2015 survey of Heathens found that women were more likely to have engaged in it. One member of the Troth, Edred Thorsson, developed forms of seiðr which involved sado-masochistic sex magic techniques, something which generated controversy in the community. Part of the discomfort that some Heathens feel toward seiðr surrounds the lack of any criteria by which the community can determine whether the seiðr-worker has genuinely received divine communication, and the fear that it will be used by some practitioners merely to bolster their own prestige.

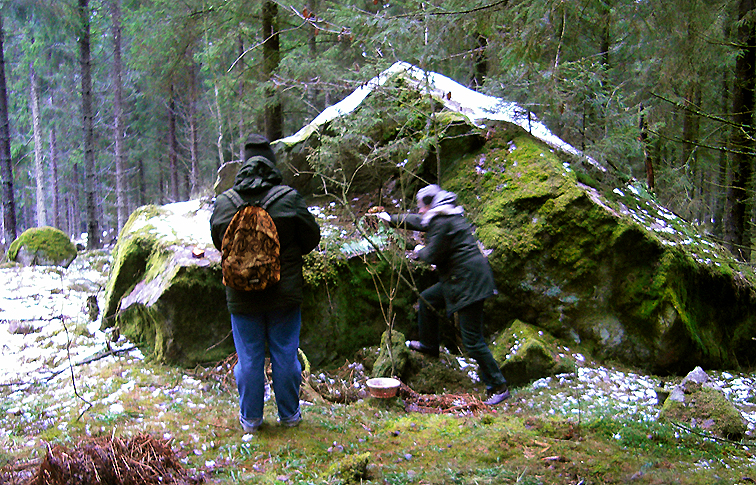
A 2010 Heathen rite at the Storbuckasten boulder in Sörby parish, Västergötland, Sweden

Galdr is another Heathen practice involving chanting or singing. In a galdr ceremony, runes or rune poems are often chanted to encourage participants to enter an altered state of consciousness and thereby communicate with deities. Some contemporary galdr chants and songs are influenced by Anglo-Saxon verbal charms, such as Æcerbot and the Nine Herbs Charm. These poems were originally written by Christians, although practitioners believe that they reflect pre-Christian themes and thus can be re-appropriated for contemporary Heathen usage.

Some Heathens practice divination using runes; as part of this, items bearing runic markings might be pulled out of a bag or bundle, and read accordingly. Sometimes, each runic letter is associated with a different deity, one of the nine realms, or aspects of life. It is common for Heathens to utilize the Common Germanic Futhark as a runic alphabet, although some practitioners instead adopt the Anglo-Saxon Futhorc or Younger Futhark. Some non-Heathens also use runes for divinatory purposes, with books on the subject being common in New Age bookstores. Certain Heathens practice magic, but this is not deemed intrinsic to Heathenry because it was not a common feature of pre-Christian rituals in Iron Age and early medieval Germanic Europe.

=== Festivals ===
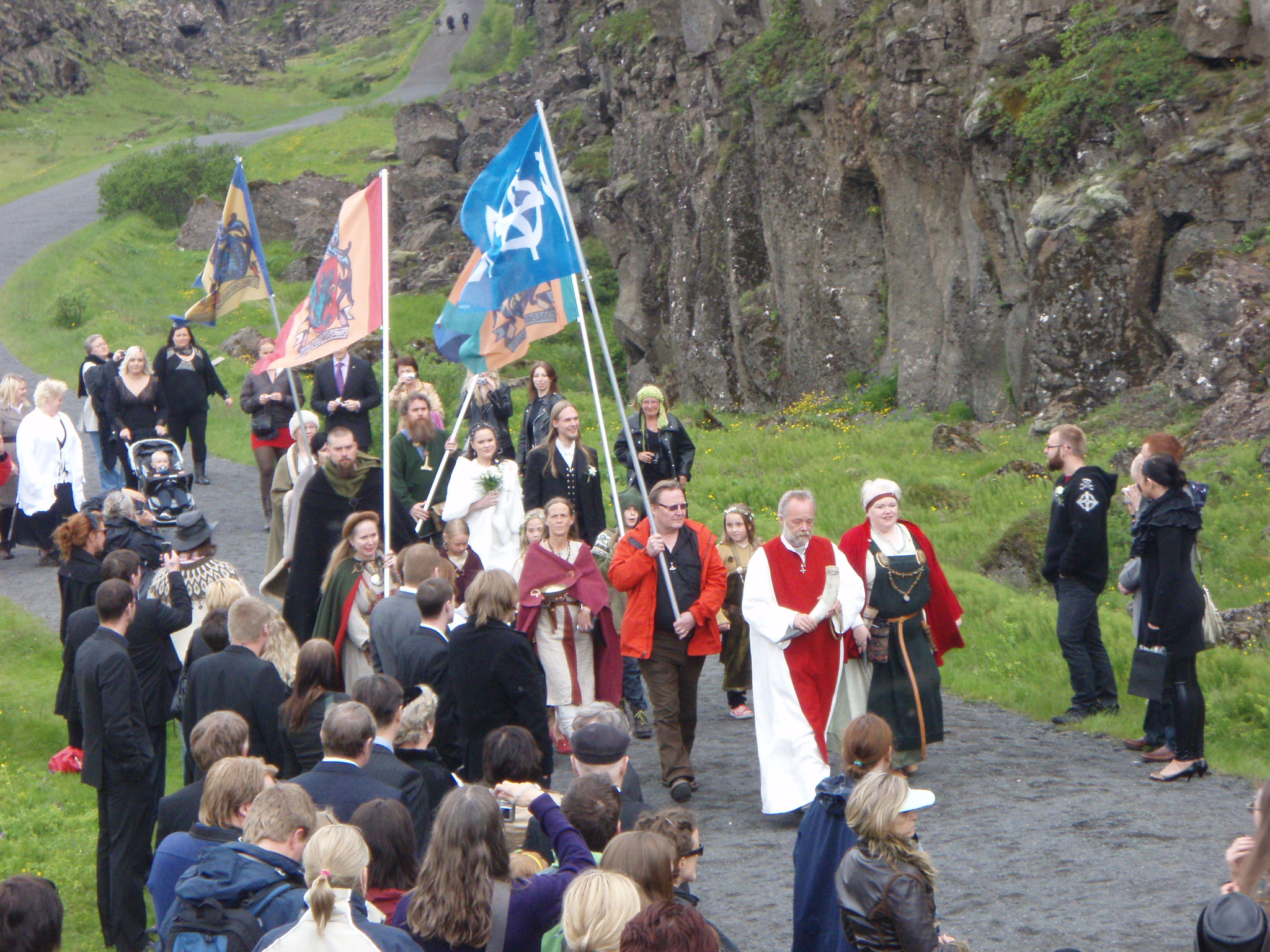
Members of the Ásatrúarfélagið preparing for a Þingblót at Þingvellir, Iceland

Different Heathen groups celebrate different festivals according to their cultural and religious focus. The most widely observed Heathen festivals are Winter Nights, Yule, and Sigrblót, all of which appear in Heimskringla and are thus of pre-Christian origin. The first of these marks the start of winter in northern Europe, the second marks Midwinter, and the last marks the beginning of summer. Heathen groups may observe additional festivals through the year, for instance to celebrate specific deities or to commemorate specific historical personages.

Some Heathens celebrate the eight festivals found in the Wheel of the Year, a tradition shared with Wiccans and several other contemporary Pagan groups. Others celebrate only six of these festivals, as represented by a six-spoked Wheel of the Year. The use of such festivals is criticized by other practitioners, who highlight that this system is of mid-20th century origin and does not link with the original festive calendar of the pre-Christian Germanic world.

Heathen groups often celebrate the festivals on the nearest available weekend to the specific festival day, enabling practitioners who work during the week can attend. During these ceremonies, Heathens often recite poetry to honor the deities, which typically draw upon or imitate the early medieval poems written in Old Norse or Old English. Mead or ale is typically drunk, with offerings being given to deities, while fires, torches, or candles are often lit. There are also regional Heathen meetings known as Things. At these, religious rites are performed, while workshops, stalls, feasts, and competitive games are also present. In the U.S., there are two national gatherings, Althing and Trothmoot.

== Racial issues ==
"Far from being a monolithic entity, [Heathenry] in the United States is extremely diverse, with many distinct ideological variations and organizations with profoundly different opinions concerning what Asatrú/Odinism is all about. The key divisive issues are centered on race and for whom the Nordic path is intended."

— Religious studies scholar Mattias Gardell

Racial issues are a major source of division among Heathens. In Heathenry, one viewpoint perceives race as entirely a matter of biological heredity, while the opposing position is that race is a social construct rooted in cultural heritage. These viewpoints are described as the folkish and the universalist positions, respectively. These two factions—which Kaplan termed the "racialist" and "nonracialist" camps—often clash. A 2015 survey revealed that more Heathens subscribed to universalist ideas than folkish ones.

Contrasting with this binary division, Gardell divides Heathenry in the United States into three groups according to their stances on race: the "anti-racist" group which denounces any association between the religion and racial identity, the "radical racist" faction which sees it as the natural religion of the Aryan race that should not be followed by members of other racial groups, and the "ethnic" faction which seeks a middle-path by acknowledging the religion's roots in northern Europe and its connection with those of northern European heritage. The religious studies scholar Stefanie von Schnurbein adopted Gardell's tripartite division, although referred to the groups as the "a-racist", "racial-religious", and "ethnicist" factions respectively.

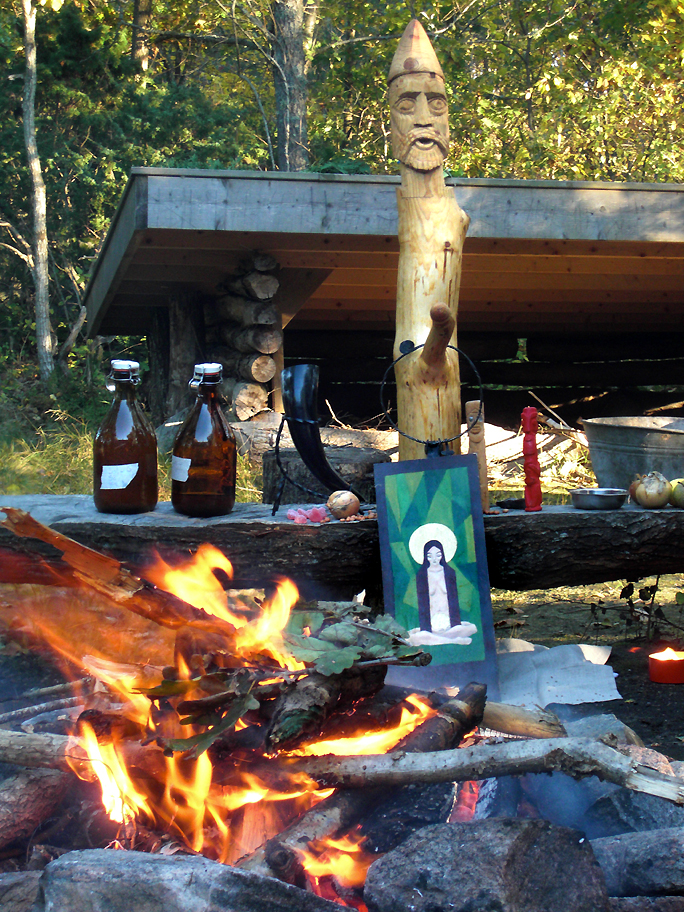
Altar for Haustblót in Bohus-Björkö, Västergötland, Sweden. The big wooden idol represents the god Frey, the smaller one next to it represents Freyja, the picture in front of it Sunna, and the small red idol Thor.

Universalist, anti-racist Heathens believe that the deities of Germanic Europe can call anyone to their worship, regardless of ethnic background. They reject the folkish emphasis on race, believing that it can lead to racist attitudes toward those not of northern European ancestry. Universalist practitioners such as Stephan Grundy have emphasized that pre-Christian northern Europeans married and had children with members of other ethnic groups, and that in Norse mythology the Æsir also did the same with Vanir, Jötun, and humans. Universalists welcome practitioners of Heathenry who are not of northern European ancestry; for instance, there are Jewish and African American members of the U.S.-based Troth. While sometimes retaining the idea of Heathenry as an indigenous religion, universalist Heathens sometimes maintain that Heathenry is indigenous to the land of northern Europe, rather than indigenous to any specific race. Universalist Heathens often express frustration when journalists depict Heathenry as intrinsically racist, and use their online presence to oppose far-right politics.

Folkish practitioners deem Heathenry to be the indigenous religion of a biologically distinct race, which is conceptualised as being "white", "Nordic", or "Aryan". Some practitioners explain this by claiming that the religion is intrinsically connected to the collective unconscious of this race; prominent American Heathen Stephen McNallen developed this into a concept he termed "metagenetics". McNallen and other folkish Heathens often deny that they are racist, although Gardell said that their views would be deemed racist under certain definitions of the word. Folkish Heathens are often ethnic nationalists, expressing disapproval of multiculturalism and the mixture of different races, advocating racial separatism. This group's discourse contains much talk of "ancestors" and "homelands", concepts that may be very vaguely defined. Ethno-centrist Heathens are heavily critical of their universalist counterparts, often believing the latter misled by New Age literature and political correctness. Those adopting the "ethnic" folkish position have been criticized by both universalist and ethno-centrist factions, the former deeming "ethnic" Heathenry a front for racism and the latter deeming its adherents race traitors for their failure to fully embrace white supremacism.

Some folkish Heathens are white supremacists and explicit racists, representing a "radical racist" faction that favours the terms Odinism, Wotanism, and Wodenism. These Heathens blend into National Socialism (Nazism), sometimes paying tribute to Adolf Hitler and Nazi Germany, and absorbing influences from Esoteric Nazism. Rejecting Christianity as a Jewish creation, they believe that the white race is facing extinction at the hands of a Jewish world conspiracy. Many in the inner circle of The Order, a white supremacist militia active in the U.S. during the 1980s, called themselves Odinists, and various racist Heathens have espoused the Fourteen Words slogan developed by the Order member David Lane. Some white supremacist organisations, such as the Order of Nine Angles and the Black Order, combine elements of Heathenry with Satanism, although other racist Heathens, such as Wotansvolk's Ron McVan, reject these integrations.

== History ==
=== Romanticist and Völkisch predecessors ===
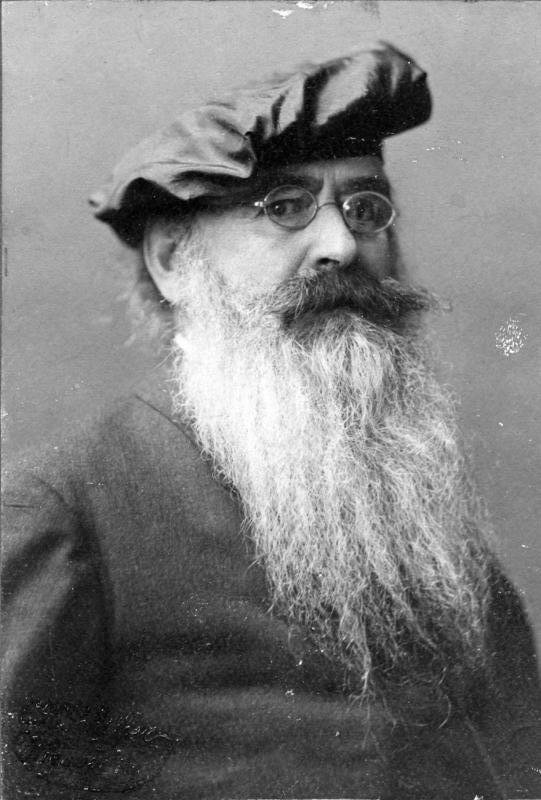
Guido von List, who promoted an early form of Heathenry

In the late 18th and 19th centuries, German Romanticism focused attention on the pre-Christian religions of Germanic Europe, with various Romanticist intellectuals arguing that these traditions were "more natural, organic and positive" than Christianity. This attitude was promoted by the scholarship of Romanticist intellectuals like Johann Gottfried Herder, Jacob Grimm, and Wilhelm Grimm. This development accompanied a growth in nationalism and the idea of the volk, contributing to the establishment of the Völkisch movement in German-speaking Europe.

Criticising the Jewish roots of Christianity, in 1900 the Germanist Ernst Wachler published a pamphlet calling for the revival of a racialized ancient German religion. Other writers, such as Ludwig Fahrenkrog, supported his call, resulting in the formation of both the Bund für Persönlichkeitskultur (League for the Culture of the Personality) and the Deutscher Orden in 1911 and then the Germanische-Deutsche Religionsgemeinschaft (Germanic-German Religious Community) in 1912.

Another development occurred within the occult völkisch movement known as Ariosophy. One of these völkisch Ariosophists was the Austrian occultist Guido von List, who established a religion that he termed "Wotanism", with an inner core that he called "Armanism". List's Wotanism was based heavily on the Eddas, although over time was increasingly influenced by Theosophy. List's ideas were transmitted in Germany by prominent right-wingers; among his followers were those who founded the Reichshammerbund in Leipzig in 1912 and key figures in the Germanenorden. From the Germanenorden emerged the Thule Society, founded by Rudolf von Sebottendorf, which exhibited a Theosophically influenced interpretation of Norse mythology.

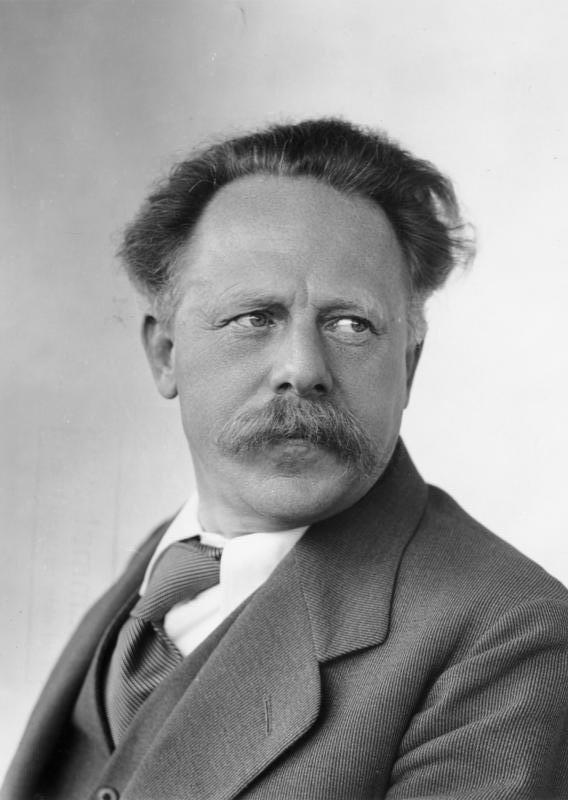
Jakob Wilhelm Hauer, leader of the German Faith Movement in the 1930s

In 1933, the German Faith Movement (Deutsche Glaubensbewegung) was founded by the religious studies scholar Jakob Wilhelm Hauer, who wanted to unite these disparate Heathen groups. While active throughout the Nazi era, his hopes that his "German Faith" would be declared the official faith of Nazi Germany were thwarted. Heathenry probably never had more than a few thousand followers during its 1920s heyday, however by maintaining the allegiance of many middle-class intellectuals, including journalists, artists, illustrators, scholars, and teachers, it exerted a wider influence on German society.

The völkisch occultists—among them Pagans like List and Christians like Jörg Lanz von Liebenfels—"contributed importantly to the mood of the Nazi era". Few had a direct influence on the Nazi Party (NSDAP) leadership, with one prominent exception: Karl Maria Wiligut was both a friend and a key influence on the Schutzstaffel (SS) leader Heinrich Himmler. Wiligut professed ancestral-clairvoyant memories of ancient German society, proclaiming that "Wotanism" was in conflict with another ancient religion, "Irminenschaft", which was devoted to a messianic Germanic figure known as Krist, who was later wrongly transformed into the figure of Jesus. Many Heathen groups disbanded during the Nazi period, but re-established in West Germany after World War II. After the defeat of Nazi Germany, there was a social stigma surrounding völkisch ideas and groups, along with a common perception that the mythologies of the pre-Christian Germanic societies had been tainted through their usage by the Nazi administration, an attitude that to some extent persisted into the 21st century.

The völkisch movement also manifested in 1930s Norway within the milieu surrounding the Ragnarok Circle and Hans S. Jacobsen's Tidsskriftet Ragnarok journal. Prominent in this milieu were the writer Per Imerslund and the composer Geirr Tveitt, although it left no successors in post-war Norway. A variant of "Odinism" was developed by the Australian Alexander Rud Mills, who published The Odinist Religion (1930) and established the Anglecyn Church of Odin. Politically racialist, Mills viewed Odinism as a religion for what he considered to be the "British race", and he deemed it to be in a cosmic battle with the Judeo-Christian religion. His ideas were heavily influenced by von List.

=== Modern development ===
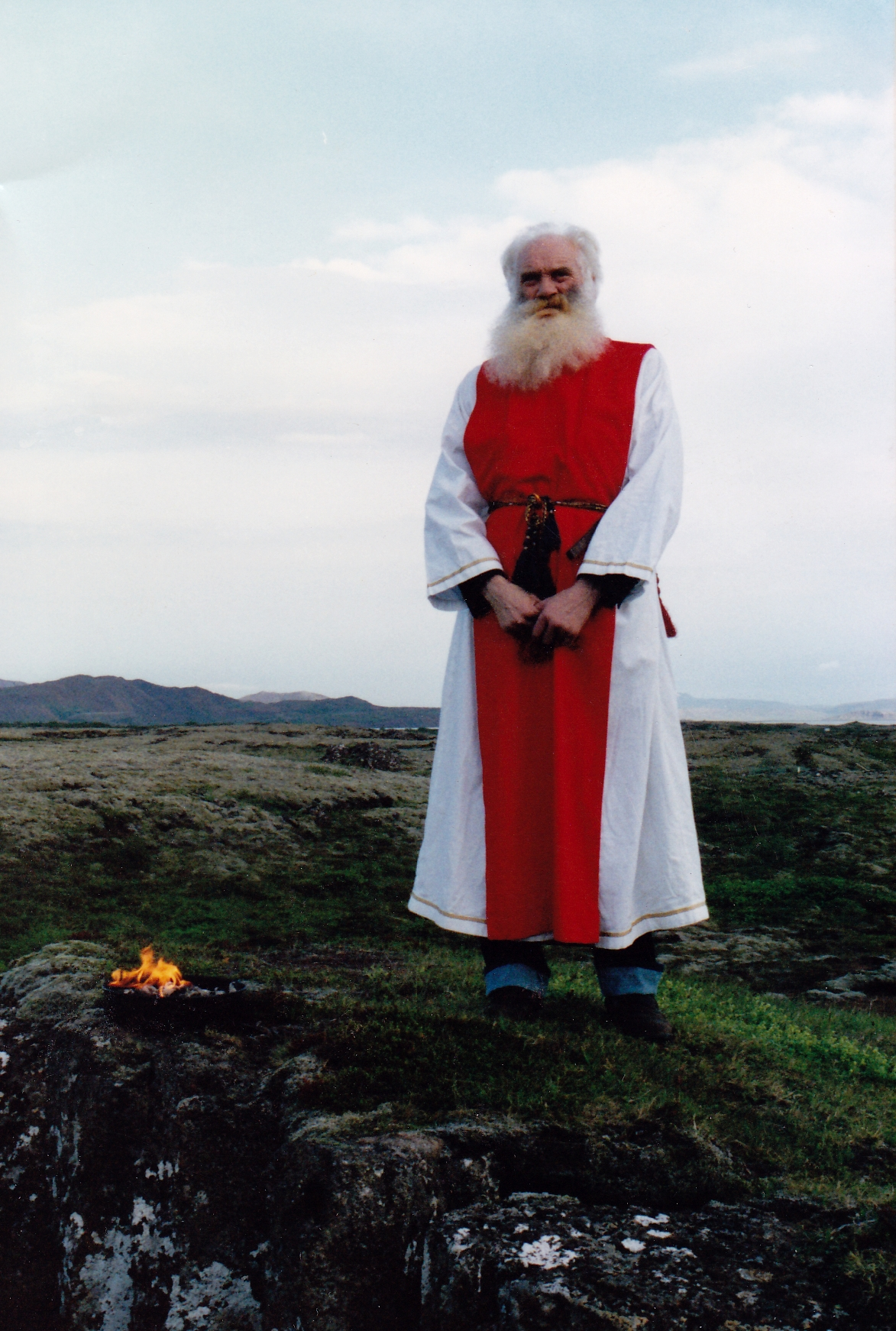
Sveinbjörn Beinteinsson, leader of the Icelandic Ásatrúarfélagið, at a blót in 1991

In the early 1970s, Heathen organisations emerged in the United Kingdom, the United States, Canada, Australia, and Iceland, largely independently from each other. This has been attributed to the wider growth of modern Paganism during the 1960s and 1970s, coupled with that if the New Age milieu, both encouraging the formation of new religious movements intent on reviving pre-Christian traditions. Further Heathen groups emerged in the 1990s and 2000s, many of which distanced themselves from overtly political agendas and placed a stronger emphasis on historical authenticity than their forebears.

Heathenry emerged in the United States during the 1960s. In 1969 the Danish Heathen Else Christensen established the Odinist Fellowship at her home in the U.S. state of Florida. Heavily influenced by Mills' writings, she began publishing a magazine, The Odinist, which placed greater emphasis on right-wing and racialist ideas than theological ones. Stephen McNallen first founded the Viking Brotherhood in the early 1970s, before creating the Asatru Free Assembly in 1976, which broke up in 1986 amid widespread political disagreements after McNallen's repudiation of neo-Nazis within the group. In the 1990s, McNallen founded the Asatru Folk Assembly (AFA), an ethnically oriented Heathen group headquartered in California. Meanwhile, Valgard Murray and his kindred in Arizona founded the Ásatrú Alliance (AA) in the late 1980s, which shared the AFA's perspectives on race and which published the Vor Tru newsletter. In 1987, Stephen Flowers and James Chisholm founded The Troth, which was incorporated in Texas. Taking an inclusive, non-racialist view, it soon grew into an international organisation.

In Iceland, the influence of pre-Christian belief systems still pervaded the country's cultural heritage into the 20th century. There, farmer Sveinbjörn Beinteinsson founded the Heathen group Ásatrúarfélagið in 1972, which initially had 12 members. Beinteinsson served as Allsherjargodi (chief priest) until his death in 1993, when he was succeeded by Jormundur Ingi Hansen. As the group expanded in size, Hansen's leadership caused schisms, and to retain the unity of the movement, he stepped down and was replaced by Hilmar Örn Hilmarsson in 2003, by which time Ásatrúarfélagið had accumulated 777 members and played a visible role in Icelandic society. In England, the British Committee for the Restoration of the Odinic Rite was established by John Yeowell in 1972. In 1992, Mark Mirabello published Odin Brotherhood, in which he wrote of the existence of a secret society of Odinists; most British Heathens doubt its existence.

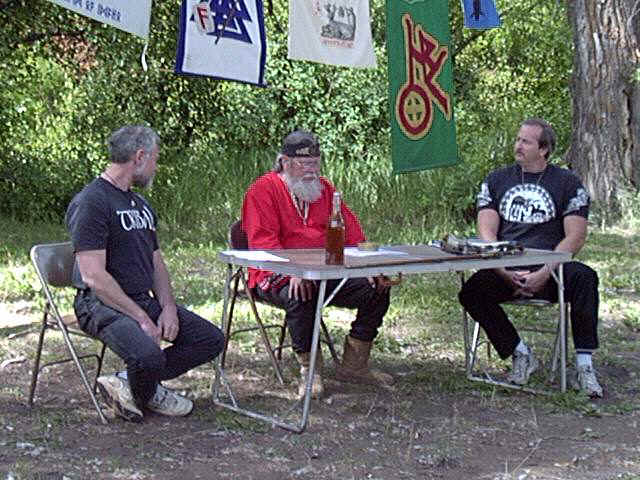
American Heathens Stephen McNallen (left) and Michael "Valgard" Murray (center), with Eric "Hnikar" Wood (right) at the 2000 Althing

In Sweden, the first Heathen groups developed in the 1970s; early examples included the Breidablikk-Gildet (Guild of Breidablikk) founded in 1975 and the Telge Fylking founded in 1987, the latter of which diverged from the former by emphasising a non-racialist interpretation of the religion. In 1994, the Sveriges Asatrosamfund (Swedish Asatru Assembly) was founded, growing to become the largest Heathen organisation in the country. The first Norwegian Heathen group, Blindern Åsatrulag, was established as a student group at the University of Oslo in the mid-1980s, while the larger Åsatrufellesskapet Bifrost was established in 1996; after a schism in that group, the Foreningen Forn Sed, now Forn Sed Norge, was formed in 1998. In Denmark, a small group was founded near to Copenhagen in 1986, however a wider Heathen movement would not appear until the 1990s, when a group calling itself Forn Siðr developed.

In Germany, various groups were established that explicitly rejected their religion's völkisch and right-wing past, most notably Rabenclan (Raven's Clan) in 1994 and Nornirs Ætt (Kin of the Norns) in 2005. Several foreign Heathen organisations also established a presence in the German Heathen scene; in 1994 the Odinic Rite Deutschland (Odinic Rite Germany) was founded, although it later declared its independence and became the Verein für germanisches Heidentum (VfgH; Society for Germanic Paganism), while the Troth also created a German group, Eldaring, which declared its independence in 2000. The first organised Heathen groups in the Czech Republic emerged in the late 1990s. From 2000 to 2008, a Czech Heathen group that adopted a Pan-Germanic approach to the religion was active under the name of Heathen Hearts from Biohaemum.

Heathen influences were apparent in forms of black metal from the 1990s, where lyrics and themes often expressed a longing for a pre-Christian "Northern past"; the mass media typically associated this music genre with Satanism. The Pagan metal genre—which emerged from the fragmentation of the extreme metal scene in northern Europe during the early 1990s—came to play an important role in the North European Pagan scene. Many musicians involved in Viking metal were also practicing Heathens, with many metal bands embracing the heroic masculinity embodied in Norse mythological figures like Odin and Thor. Heathen themes also appeared in the neofolk genre. From the mid-1990s, the Internet greatly aided the propagation of Heathenry in various parts of the world. That decade also saw the strong growth of racist Heathenry among those incarcerated within the U.S. prison system as a result of outreach programs established by various Heathen groups, a project begun in the 1980s. During this period, many Heathen groups also began to interact increasingly with other ethnic-oriented Pagan groups in Eastern Europe, such as Lithuanian Romuva, and many joined the World Congress of Ethnic Religions upon its formation in 1998.

== Demographics ==
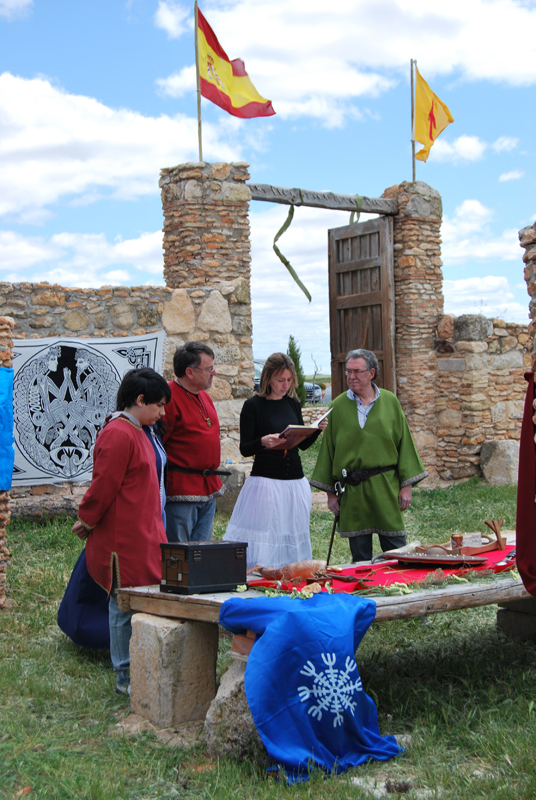
A Heathen wedding in Spain, 2010

Heathens are found in Europe, Australasia, North America, and Latin America. They are mostly, although not exclusively, found in areas with a Germanic cultural inheritance. In 2007, the religious studies scholar Graham Harvey stated that it was impossible to develop a precise figure for the number of Heathens across the world. A self-selected census in 2013 found 16,700 members in 98 countries, the bulk of whom lived in the United States. In 2016, Schnurbein stated that there were probably no more than 20,000 Heathens globally.

Schnurbein thought most Heathen groups were 60–70% male in their composition. Drawing of his sociological research, Joshua Marcus Cragle agreed that the religion contained a greater proportion of men than women, but highlighted a more even gender balance in northern and western Europe. Cragle found that most Heathens were of European descent, and that, in all regions except Latin America, most were middle-aged. He also found that Heathenry had a greater proportion of LGBT practitioners (21%) than the general population, including a greater proportion of transgender people (2%) specifically.

Many Heathens claim that a childhood interest in German folk tales or Norse myths, or portrayals of Norse religion in popular culture, contributed to their interest in Heathenry. Others joined after experiencing direct revelation through dreams, which they interpret as coming from the gods. As with other religions, many Heathens have reported a feeling of "coming home" when converting to the movement, however Calico thought such a narrative was "not characteristic" of most U.S. Heathens. Pizza argued that, in the U.S., many European-Americans joined Heathenry because of a desire to "find roots" in historic European cultures and to meet "a genuine need for spiritual connections and community".

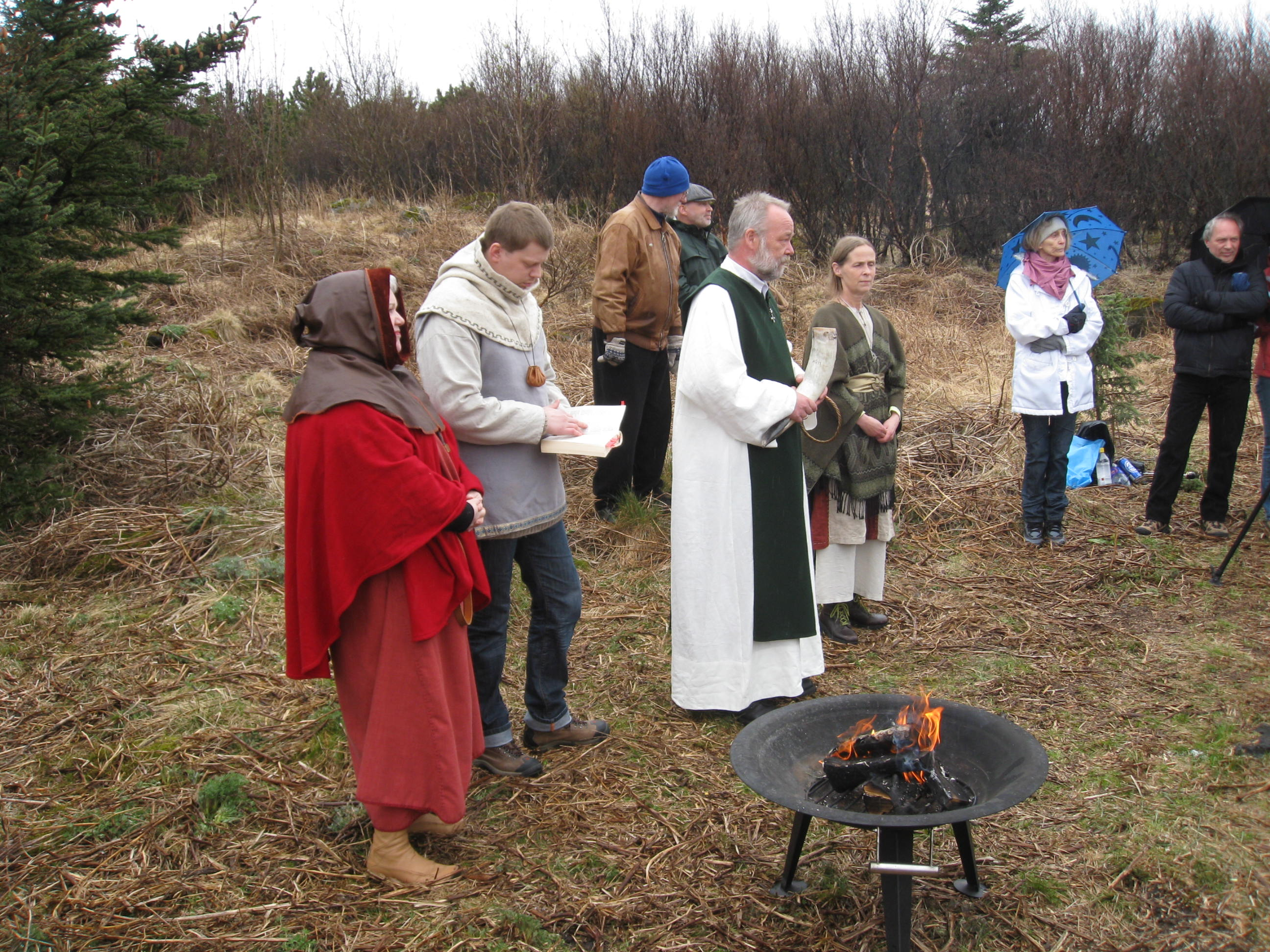
A 2009 rite performed on the Icelandic hill of Öskjuhlíð, Reykjavík

Cragle's 2015 survey indicated that 45% of Heathens had been raised Christian, although 21% had previously had no religious affiliation or been atheists or agnostics. Practitioners typically live in Christian majority societies, however often feel Christianity has little to offer them. Schnurbein found that, during the 1980s, many European Heathens joined the religion in part because they held anti-Christian views, but that this attitude had decreased in later decades. Among American Heathens, Calico noted in 2018 that a "deep antipathy" to Christianity was still "quite close to the surface", with Snook, Thad Horrell, and Kristen Horton commenting that American Heathens "almost always formulate oppositional identities" to Christianity. Anti-Christian sentiment is often expressed through humor in the Heathen community.

Many Heathens are involved in historical reenactment, focusing on the early medieval societies of Germanic Europe; others criticise this practice, believing that it blurs the boundary between real life and fantasy. Some adherents also practice Heathenry in tandem with other Pagan religions, such as Wicca or Druidry, but many others look unfavorably on such religions for being too syncretic.

=== North America ===
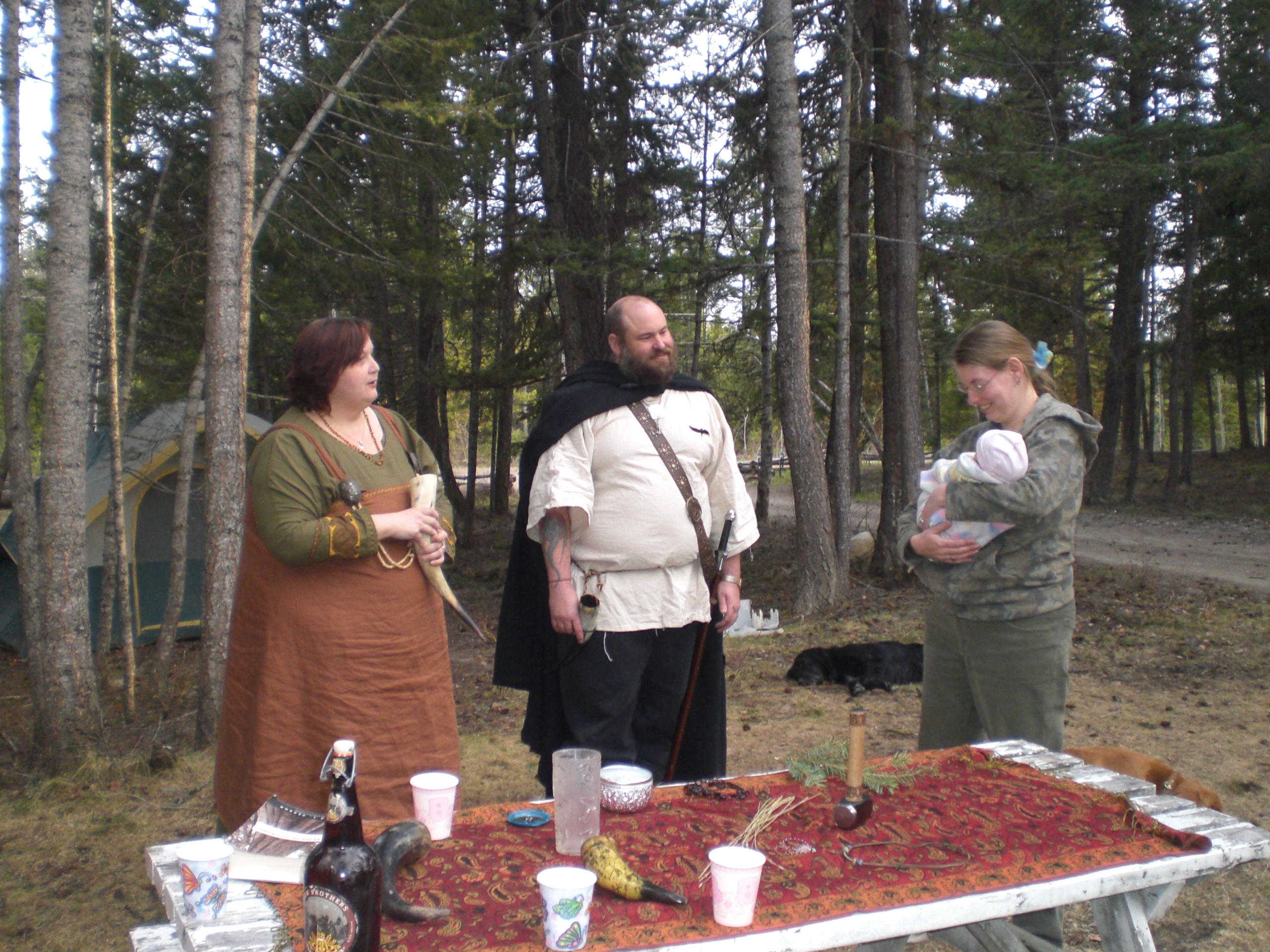
A Heathen baby naming ceremony in British Columbia, Canada, in 2010

The United States likely possesses the world's largest Heathen community. In the mid-1990s the sociologist Jeffrey Kaplan estimated that there were around 500 active practitioners in the U.S., with a thousand more on the movement's periphery. The 2014 census recorded 7,878 U.S. Heathens, while in 2018, the scholar of religion Jefferson F. Calico suggested that there were between 8000 and 20,000 Heathens in the U.S.

Kaplan observed that most American Heathens were white, male, and young, possessing at least an undergraduate degree, and worked in either white collar or blue collar jobs. In 2015, Snook concurred that the majority of American Heathens were male, adding that most were white and middle-aged, but believed that there had been a growth in the proportion of female Heathens in the U.S. since the mid-1990s. The Pagan Census project led by Helen A. Berger, Evan A. Leach, and Leigh S. Shaffer gained 60 responses from Heathens in the U.S. Of these respondents, 65% were male and 35% female, which differed from the female majority found among American Pagans more widely. Most had a college education, but were generally less well educated and had a lower median income than American Pagans as a whole.

=== Europe ===
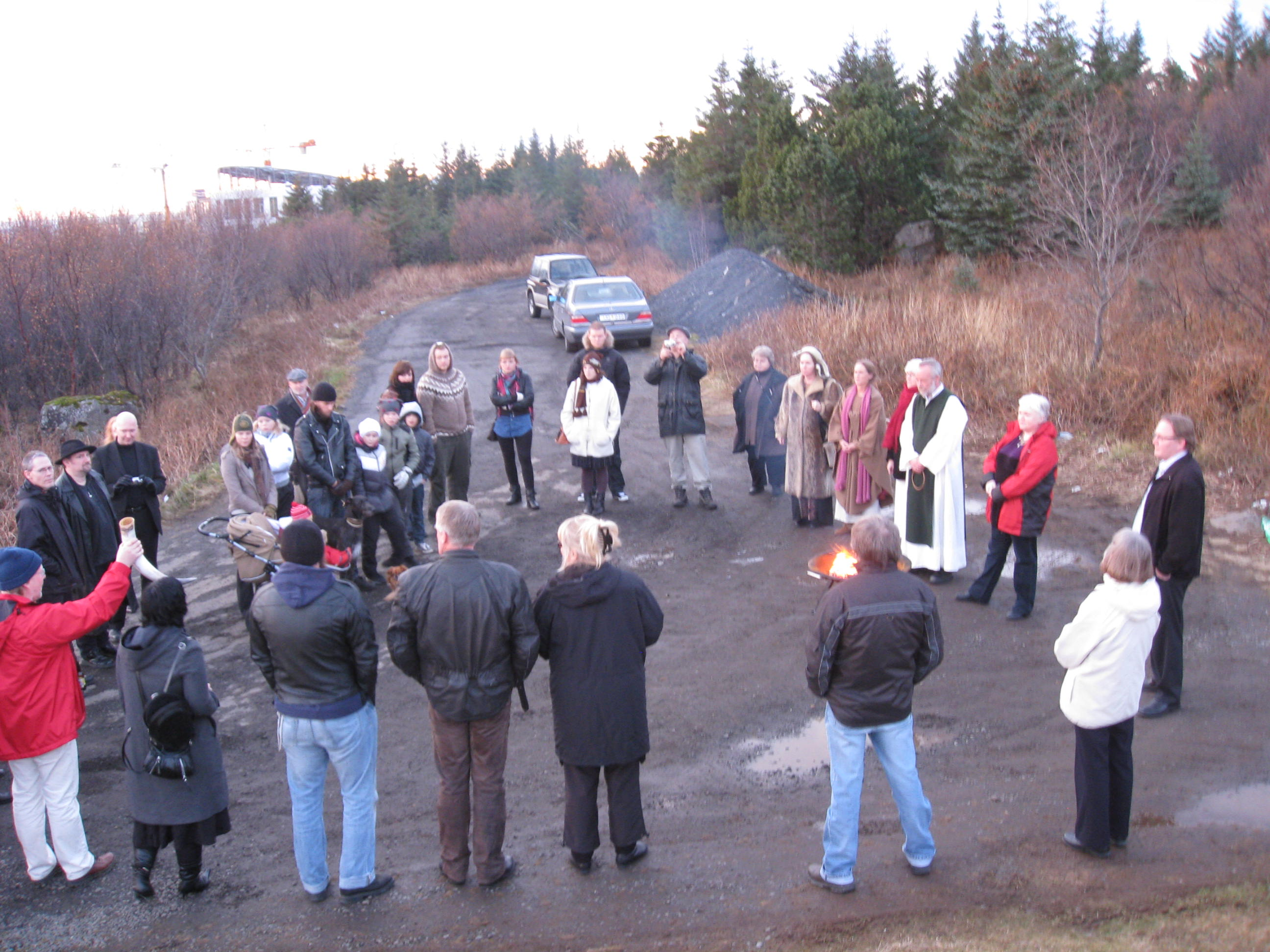
A 2009 blót held by Heathens in Iceland

By 2003, the Icelandic Heathen organisation Ásatrúarfélagið had 777 members; this had risen to 2,400 members by 2015, and 3,583 members by 2017 constituting just over 1% of the Icelandic population. In Iceland, Heathenry has an impact larger than the number of its adherents. In 2016, Schnurbein observed that most Scandinavian Heathens were middle-class professionals aged between thirty and sixty. Specific numbers are not known for Denmark, although Gregorius estimated that, as of 2015, there were at most a thousand Heathens in Sweden.

In the 2001 United Kingdom census, 300 people registered as Heathen in England and Wales, which grew to 1,958 in the 2011 census. In Central and Eastern Europe, small numbers of Heathens exist in Poland, Slovenia, and Serbia. In Russia, several far-right groups merge elements from Heathenry with aspects adopted from Slavic Native Faith and Russian Orthodox Christianity. There are also several Heathens in the Israeli Pagan scene.
