= Eldaring =

German neopagan organisation

- Formation: 2000; 26 years ago
- Type: Religious organisation
- Purpose: Germanic neopaganism
- Location: Germany
- Members: 600 (self claim)
- Chairman: Uwe Ehrenhöfer
- Website: eldaring.de

Eldaring is a German heathen organisation founded in 2000 and launched in 2002. It operates as an umbrella organisation for local groups and independent practitioners.

== History ==
Eldaring began in 2000 as a private Internet mailing list before it officially was registered as an organisation in 2002. The name is derived from the Old Norse word eldr which means "fire". It initially functioned as the German branch of the American organisation The Troth but eventually became independent. It was active in the World Congress of Ethnic Religions from the mid-2000s to 2009. (Note: Eldaring left the WCER due to a lack of action against participating organisations that were inspired by Ariosophy, an occult movement with connotations to racial politics. In 2010, the WCER (then renamed ECER) added an explicit rejection of Ariosophy to its website.) As of August 2025, Eldaring claimed to have more than 600 members.

== Beliefs and activity ==
A text listed as a "basic article" on Eldaring's website defines heathenry as a religion based on nature, experience and transmission of wisdom. The article says that heathens value deeds over abstract values and life in the world over otherworldly salvation, and rejects the Christian conception of good and evil, the division between secular and spiritual and the concept of original sin. Elsewhere, Eldaring officials have associated their views with Theo Sundermeier's and Jan Assmann's concept of "primary religion", which refers to religions that have evolved within a culture, society and language, rather than having been revealed.

Eldaring operates as a network of Germanic neopagans. The members generally regard religion as a private matter and are not expected to commit to the organisation, beyond using it as a platform for contacts and service. Members can be active in local divisions called Herde (lit. 'hearths'), local blót groups, special interests groups, and participate at annual events. The blót rituals may take place around a fire and include sacrificial gifts and libations in veneration of gods and ancestors. Eldaring generally emphasises the reliance on academic research for the reconstruction of pre-Christian practices, but recognises that not much documentation exists in many cases. Like The Troth, it views the Poetic Edda as a source for references and orientation, which should be supplemented by summaries of academic research. The organisation generally rejects folkloristic sources, although some members have argued in favour of making exceptions.

Eldaring publishes the magazine Herdfeuer (lit. 'hearth fire') since 2003. It is politically neutral but has as a stated goal to increase public awareness and acceptance of its religious views.
