= Stephen Flowers =

American runologist, writer, and occultist

Stephen Edred Flowers
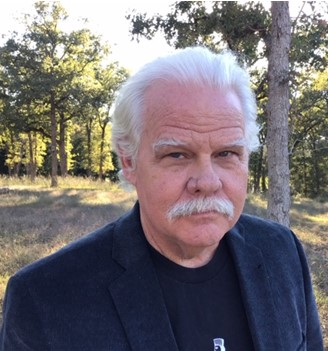
- Born: Stephen Edred Flowers; Bonham, Texas, US
- Other names: Edred Thorsson, Darban-i-Den
- Occupation: Lecturer
- Known for: Neo-Germanic paganism, Odinism, Runology

Academic background
- Education: University of Texas at Austin

Stephen Edred Flowers, also known by the pen name Edred Thorsson, is an American scholar, Heathen, occultist, and runologist. He is the author of over thirty books on these subjects.

Flowers was involved in Heathenry by the 1970s, aligning with the folkish wing of the movement. During the 1980s, Flowers was a founding member of the Ring of Troth, an American Heathen organisation. He subsequently distanced himself from the group. Through his books, Flowers played a key role in promoting the use of runes within the Heathen movement. He formed a group called the Rune Gild to further explore this development. In 1984, Flowers joined the Temple of Set and between 1987 and 1990 he served as the Grand Master of Temple's Order of the Trapezoid.

In the 21st century, Flowers worked towards promoting the ideas of the Nouvelle Droite, a far-right movement originating in France, to an international audience.

== Biography ==
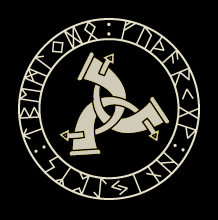
Logo of the Rune-Gild with Elder Futhark and Triskelion

=== Founding the Ring of Troth ===
Flowers, alongside James Chisholm and several others, was among the founders of the Ring of Troth, a Heathen organization that provided an alternative to Valgard Murray's Asatru Alliance. This differed from existing Heathen groups by being intended as a national organization to which people could join as individual members, rather than comprising affiliated small-groups known as kindreds.

As part of his interest in runes, Flowers drew on the Runengymnastick or Runenyoga movements that had emerged within the völkisch context of early 20th-century Europe. He added to this practice the use of mantras from Hinduism, in addition to ideas from ceremonial magic and Theosophy, and promoted the practice under the new name of stadhagaldr. This practice he promoted in his book Futhark: A Handbook of Rune Magic. Flowers' work played a significant role in making the use of runes a prominent part of the Heathen movement.

In the 1980s, Flowers was also involved in the Temple of Set, a group founded by Michael Aquino. That decade, Aquino founded an inner group within the Temple known as the Order of the Trapezoid; its name was lifted directly from the early governing body of the Church of Satan. For Aquino and the Setians, it was seen as a chivalric order of knights. From 1987 through to 1995, Flowers became the Grand Master of the Order of the Trapezoid; he had joined the Temple of Set in 1984 and risen to the Fifth Degree in 1990. Flowers exerted a "discernible influence" over the Setian community through his books, in which he combined aspects of Satanic philosophy with Heathenry.

In the Spring of 1995, due to inner turmoil, Flowers withdrew from any involvement with the Ring of Troth. In August 1995, he and Dawn traveled to Iceland and England for work related to the Rune-Gild. In April 1996, Flowers retired from his position as Grand Master of the Order of the Trapezoid to focus more intently on Rune-Gild matters.

=== Promotion of the Nouvelle Droite ===
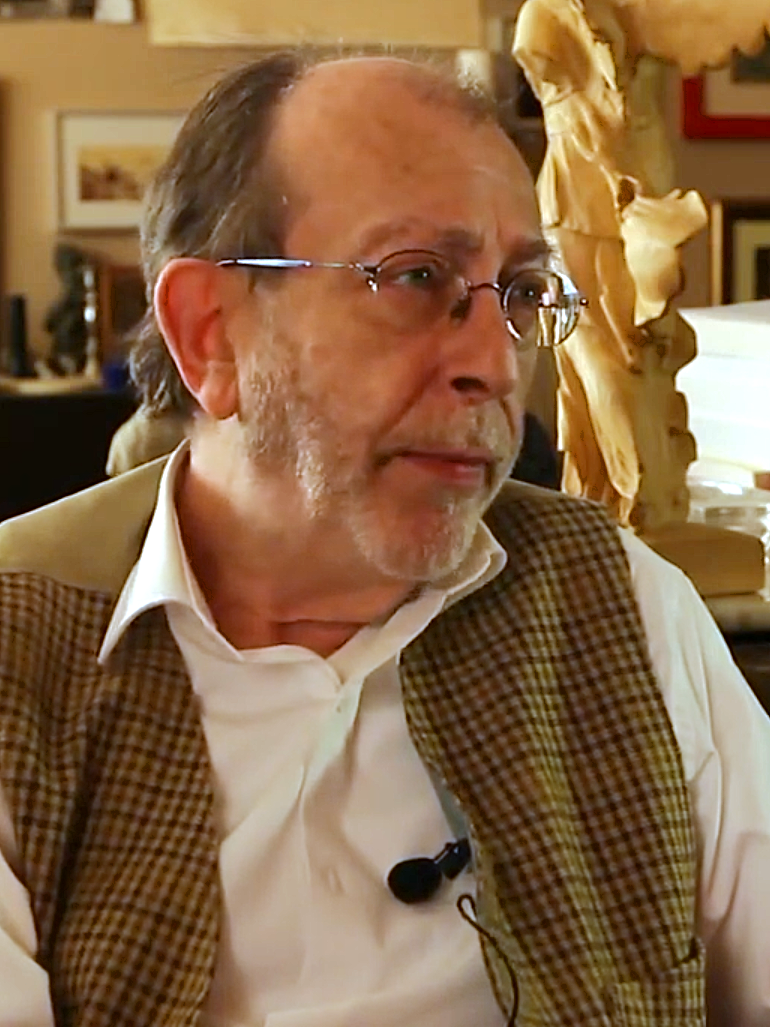
Flowers aligned with the Nouvelle Droite and published translations of books by its main figure, Alain de Benoist (pictured)

The scholar of religion Amy Hale noted that Flowers "openly expressed the importance of promoting" the far-right Nouvelle Droite movement among "Pagans in the United States". Flowers published an English translation of On Being a Pagan, a book by the French Nouvelle Droite ideologue Alain de Benoist, through his publishing company Runa Raven Press. He was also a close associate of Michael J. Moynihan and Joshua Buckley, who were similarly involved in the promotion of the Nouvelle Droite ideology.

Damon T. Berry's 2017 book Blood and Faith said Flowers was "deeply involved" in the North American New Right. Flowers has also published with far-right publishing company Arktos. An article in Spiral Nature in 2019 noted his associations with Red Ice TV.

== Ideas ==
Flowers has been characterised as a folkish Heathen. Folkish Heathens believe that a person needs to be racially descended from ancient Germanic populations to worship the Old Norse gods. This differs from the universalist Heathen stance, which argues that anyone can venerate these deities. Flowers's stadhagaldr practice is linked to his belief in the existence of "rune streams," meaning the notion that runes are cosmic energies flowing through the world.

== Works ==
- —— (1984). Futhark: A Handbook of Rune Magic (Reissued 2012, Revised 2020. ed.). Samuel Weiser. ISBN 978-0877285489.
- —— (1986). Runes and Magic: Magical Formulaic Elements in the Older Runic Tradition (doctoral dissertation). Germany: Peter Lang Inc., International Academic Publishers. ISBN 978-0820403335.
- Thorsson, Edred (1987). Runelore: A Handbook of Esoteric Runology (later retitled as Runelore: The Magic, History, and Hidden Codes of the Runes). Samuel Weiser. ISBN 978-0877286677.
- Thorsson, Edred (1988). At the Well of Wyrd. (retitled as Runecaster's Handbook: The Well of Wyrd in 1999), Samuel Weiser. ISBN 978-1578631360.
- Thorsson, Edred (1989). A Book of Troth. Llewellyn Publications. (second edition, 2003, Rûna-Raven Press; third edition, 2015, Runestone Press [Ultra]; fourth edition, 2022, Arcana Europa Media). ISBN 979-8986223407.
- Flowers, Stephen E. (1990). Fire and Ice: Magical Teachings of Germany's Greatest Secret Occult Order (revised second edition retitled as Fire & Ice: The History, Structure, and Rituals of Germany's Most Influential Modern Magical Order: The Brotherhood of Saturn in 1994). Llewellyn. ISBN 978-0875427768. (Revised third edition retitled as The Fraternitas Saturni: History, Doctrine, and Rituals of the Magical Order of the Brotherhood of Saturn published with Inner Traditions/Bear in 2018. ISBN 978-1620557211.
- Thorsson, Edred (1991). The Nine Doors of Midgard: A Complete Curriculum of Rune Magic. Llewellyn Publications. ISBN 978-0875427812. Revised in 2003 and retitled as The Nine Doors of Midgard: A Curriculum of Rune-work published by Rûna-Raven Press in 2003. ISBN 978-1885972231. Revised and expanded fifth edition published by Arcana Europa Media LLC in 2018. ISBN 978-0971204485.
- Thorsson, Edred. (1992). Northern Magic: Mysteries of the Norse, Germans & English (revised second edition retitled as Northern Magic: Rune Mysteries & Shamanism). Llewellyn Publications. ISBN 978-1567187090.
- Thorsson, Edred. (1993). Rune-Song: A Guide to Galdor. Rûna-Raven Press. ISBN 979-8728505730. Reissued in 2021 by Arcana Europa Media.
- Flowers, Stephen Edred. (1995). Black Rûna: Being the Shorter Works of Stephen Edred Flowers, Produced for the Order of the Trapezoid of the Temple of Set (1985-1989). (reissued and retitled as Dark Rûna: Containing the Complete Essays Originally Published in Black Rûna (1995) by Lodestar Books in 2019). ISBN 978-1885972507.
- Thorsson, Edred. (1996). Green Rûna: The Runemaster's Notebook: Shorter Works of Edred Thorsson, Volume I (1978-1985). Rûna-Raven Press. (reissued by Lodestar Books in 2021). ISBN 978-1885972880.
- Flowers, Stephen E. (1997). Lords of the Left-hand Path: A History of Spiritual Dissent. Rûna-Raven Press. ISBN 978-1885972088. (second revised edition retitled as Lords of the Left-Hand Path: Forbidden Practices and Spiritual Heresies in 2012). Inner Traditions/Bear. ISBN 978-1594774676.
- Flowers, Stephen E. (1999). A Concise Edition of Old English Runic Inscriptions. Rûna-Raven Press.
- Thorsson, Edred. (2001). Blue Rûna: Edred's Shorter Works Vol. III (1988-1994). Rûna-Raven Press. ISBN 1-885972-16-4. Republished by Asatru Folk Assembly in 2011. ISBN 978-1885972163.
- Flowers, Stephen Edred. (2001). Red Rûna: Shorter Works, Vol. IV (1987-2001). Rûna-Raven Press.
- Thorsson, Edred. (2011). The Mysteries of the Goths. Lodestar Books. ISBN 978-1885972316.
- —— (2014). The Good Religion. Runa-Raven Press. ISBN 978-1885972996.
- —— (2014). Runarmal II. Runa-Raven Press. ISBN 978-1885972989.
- —— (2015). Sigurdr. Runa-Raven Press. ISBN 978-1885972958.
- —— (2015). Wendish Mythology. Runa-Raven Press. ISBN 978-1885972132.
- —— (2017). The Mazdan Way: Essays on the Good Religion for the West. Lodestar. ISBN 978-1885972453.
- —— (2017). The Northern Dawn: A History of the Reawakening of the Germanic Spirit: From the Twilight of the Gods to the Sun at Midnight. Arcana Europa Media LLC. ISBN 978-0972029285.
- —— (2017). Original Magic: The Rituals and Initiations of the Persian Magi. Inner Traditions/Bear. ISBN 978-1620556443.
- —— (2017). Runarmal I: The Runa-Talks: Summer 1991ev. Lodestar. ISBN 978-1885972620.
- Thorsson, Edred (2018). Rune Might: The Secret Practices of the German Rune Magicians. (3rd edition, revised and expanded). Inner Traditions/Bear. ISBN 978-1620557259. Originally published in 1989 by Llewellyn Publications under the title Rune Might: Secret Practices of the German Rune Magicians. Second revised and expanded edition published in 2004 by Runa-Raven Press under the title Rune-Might: History and Practices of the Early 20th Century German Rune Magicians.
- Thorsson, Edred (2018). The Big Book of Runes and Rune Magic: How to Interpret Runes, Rune Lore, and the Art of Runecasting. Weiser Books. ISBN 978-1578636525. This book is a revision and expansion upon his original three-book series of Futhark (1984), Runelore (1987), and At the Well of Wyrd (1988).
- Thorsson, Edred. (2019). Witchdom of the True: A Study of the Vana-Troth and Seidr. Lodestar Books. ISBN 978-1885972170.
- —— (2019). Dark Rûna: Containing the Complete Essays Originally Published in Black Rûna (1995). Lodestar. ISBN 978-1885972507.
- —— (2019). The Magian Tarok: The Origins of the Tarot in the Mithraic and Hermetic Traditions. Inner Traditions/Bear. ISBN 978-1620558690.
- —— (2019). Studia Germanica. Lodestar. ISBN 978-1885972309.
- Thorsson, Edred. (2019). History of the Rune-Gild: The Reawakening of the Gild (1980-2018). Gilded Books, imprint of Arcana Europa Media. ISBN 978-0999724545.
- Thorsson, Edred. (2020). Re-Tribalize Now!: A Step-by-Step Guide to Cultural Renewal. Arcana Europa Media.
- —— (2021). Revival of the Runes: The Modern Rediscovery and Reinvention of the Germanic Runes. Inner Traditions/Bear. ISBN 978-1644111789.
- —— (2022). The Occult in National Socialism: The Symbolic, Scientific, and Magical Influences on the Third Reich. Inner Traditions/Bear. ISBN 978-1644115749.
- —— (2022). The Occult Roots of Bolshevism. Lodestar Books. ISBN 978-1885972873.

=== As co-author ===
- Flowers, Stephen E.; Moynihan, Michael (2007). The Secret King: The Myth and Reality of Nazi Occultism. Feral House. ISBN 978-1932595253.
- Flowers, Stephen E.; Flowers, Crystal Dawn (2013). Carnal Alchemy: Sado-Magical Techniques for Pleasure, Pain, and Self-Transformation. Inner Traditions/Bear. ISBN 978-1620551097.
- Flowers, Stephen Edred; Von List, Guido (2015). Freemasonry and the Germanic Tradition. Rûna-Raven Press. ISBN 978-1885972927.
- Flowers, Stephen Edred; Chisholm, James (2015). Source Book of Seid. Runa-Raven Press. ISBN 978-1885972972.

=== As editor ===
- Flowers, Stephen (1995). Hermetic Magic: The Postmodern Magical Papyrus of Abaris. Red Wheel Weiser. ISBN 978-0877288282.

=== As translator ===
- List, Guido von, Stephen E. Flowers (trans., 1988), The Secret of the Runes. Inner Traditions. ISBN 978-0892812073.
- Flowers, Stephen E. (1989). The Galdrabók: An Icelandic Grimoire. Originally published by Samuel Weiser (1989), then Rûna-Raven Press (2005) ISBN 978-1885972088, then as a second revised edition retitled as The Galdrabók: An Icelandic Book of Magic with Lodestar Books (2011), then a third revised edition and retitled as Icelandic Magic: Practical Secrets of the Northern Grimoires and published by Inner Traditions (2016). ISBN 978-1620554050.
- Kummer, S.A., Edred Thorsson (trans., 2017), Rune-Magic. Lodestar Books. ISBN 978-1885972613.
