= List of modern pagans =

Modern pagan individuals of merit

This is a list of notable modern individuals who self-describe as adherents of some form of paganism or neopaganism.

== Baltic ==
- Bīne, Jēkabs, Latvian artist
- Brastiņš, Arvīds, Latvian sculptor and writer
- Brastiņš, Ernests, founder of the neopagan organization Dievturība
- Brikmanis, Jānis, zoologist, environmental conservationist, radio and television presenter, and writer
- Celms, Valdis, leader of the neopagan organization Latvijas Dievtuŗu sadraudze
- Eglītis, Viktors, Latvian writer
- Trinkūnas, Jonas, founder and the former high priest of the Lithuanian pagan society Romuva, husband of Inija Trinkūnienė
- Trinkūnienė, Inija, current high priestess of the Lithuanian pagan society Romuva, wife of Jonas Trinkūnas
- Vaiškūnas, Jonas, Lithuanian physicist, museologist and publisher
- Vējonis, Raimonds, president of Latvia
- Vīka, Hilda, Latvian artist and writer
- Vydūnas, Lithuanian writer and philosopher

== Germanic ==
Germanic neopagans include:

- Aswynn, Freya, Dutch writer and musician
- Bowden, Jonathan, English political activist and orator.
- Christensen, Else, Odinist Fellowship
- Eyvindur P. Eiríksson, Icelandic writer, Íslenska Ásatrúarfélagið
- Fahrenkrog, Ludwig, German artist and writer
- Flowers, Stephen, American writer and scholar
- Frenssen, Gustav, German novelist
- Gaahl, Norwegian musician
- Grundy, Stephan, American writer and scholar
- Gunnhildur Hauksdóttir, Icelandic artist, Íslenska Ásatrúarfélagið
- Günther, Hans F. K., German writer
- Halloran, Dan, American politician (New York City Councilman), Theodism
- Hauer, Jakob Wilhelm, German Faith Movement
- Haugen, Andrea, German musician
- Haukur Halldórsson, Icelandic artist, Íslenska Ásatrúarfélagið
- Heimgest, Odinic Rite
- Hilmar Örn Hilmarsson, Íslenska Ásatrúarfélagið
- Jón frá Pálmholti, Icelandic poet
- Jónína Kristín Berg, Íslenska Ásatrúarfélagið
- Jörmundur Ingi Hansen, Íslenska Ásatrúarfélagið
- Logghe, Koenraad
- Ludendorff, Erich, German general
- Ludendorff, Mathilde, German psychiatrist
- Lyngvild, Jim, Danish designer, writer, fashion columnist and television personality
- McNallen, Stephen, Asatru Folk Assembly
- Mills, Alexander Rud, Odinism
- Moondog, American musician and poet
- Moynihan, Michael Jenkins, American publisher and musician
- Neményi, Géza von, Germanische Glaubens-Gemeinschaft
- Nordvig, Mathias, Danish Scandinavian studies scholar
- Org, Luci van, German musician and writer
- Paxson, Diana, science fiction author, editor of Idunna, the quarterly journal of the Troth
- Raes, Roeland, Flemish politician
- Read, Ian, English musician
- Reventlow, Ernst, German Faith Movement
- Rudgley, Richard, British author and television presenter
- Seigfried, Karl E. H., American musician and writer
- Sprouse, Dylan, actor, The Suite Life of Zack & Cody
- Sveinbjörn Beinteinsson, Íslenska Ásatrúarfélagið
- Tauring, Kari, American musician
- Tveitt, Geirr, Norwegian composer
- Varg Vikernes, Norwegian black metal musician and writer
- Wakeford, Tony, English musician

== Greek ==
- Fransham, John, English eccentric, tutor and author
- Kalentzis, Aristotelis, Greek national socialist horseback archery instructor and author
- Orsini, Jessica, American transgender politician (Alderwoman in Centralia, Missouri), Hellenic Reconstructionist
- Rassias, Vlassis, Greek writer and founder of the Supreme Council of Ethnic Hellenes
- Schulz, Cara, American politician (City Council member in Burnsville, Minnesota), Hellenismos/Hellenion

== Neo-druidism ==
Neo-druids include:

- Berthou, Gwilherm, Breton poet
- Bonewits, Isaac, author and scholar of several Druid and neopagan related books and articles
- Carr-Gomm, Philip, former chosen chief of the Order of Bards, Ovates, and Druids
- D'Ambrosio, Ossian, founder of Antica Quercia and Cerchio Druidico Italiano
- Greer, John Michael, American author, Druid, and former Grand Archdruid of the Ancient Order of Druids in America (AODA)
- Hutton, Ronald, scholar of British history; professor at University of Bristol, and author of books on the history of neopaganism
- Le Scouëzec, Gwenc'hlan, Goursez Vreizh
- Marchal, Morvan, Breton architect and activist
- Pendragon, Arthur, leader of the Loyal Arthurian Warband, self-declared reincarnation of King Arthur
- Nichols, Ross, founder of the Order of Bards, Ovates, and Druids
- Paredes, Xoán, Irmandade Druídica Galaica
- Restall Orr, Emma, Druid priestess, author, founder of the Druid Network
- Shallcrass, Philip, current head of the British Druid Order
- Tullou, Raffig, Breton sculptor and set designer

== Roman ==
- Armentano, Amedeo Rocco, Italian esotericist and musician
- Boni, Giacomo, Italian archeologist
- Musmeci Ferrari Bravo, Roggero, Italian poet and playwright
- Reghini, Arturo, Italian mathematician, philosopher and esotericist

== Slavic ==
- Antonych, Bohdan Ihor, Ukrainian poet
- Arkhipova, Maria, Russian musician
- Biletsky, Andriy, Ukrainian politician
- Chodakowski, Zorian Dołęga, Polish ethnographer
- Harlender, Zdzisław, Polish pilot, army officer and writer
- Kołodziej, Władysław, pioneer of modern paganism in Poland
- Potrzebowski, Stanisław, Rodzima Wiara
- Povetkin, Alexander, Russian professional boxer
- Shaian, Volodymyr, Ukrainian linguist and philologist
- Stachniuk, Jan, Zadruga
- Veleslav, Russian Rodnover priest
- Žiarislav (Miroslav Švický), Slovak musician

== Turko-Mongolic ==
- Atsız, Nihal, Turkish Tengrist ideologist and writer
- Bira, Shagdaryn, Mongolian academician of the Academy of Sciences and historian
- Gurkin, Grigory, Altaian painter and politician
- Kenin-Lopsan, Mongush, Tuvan anthropologist and religious leader
- Sarygulov, Dastan, Kyrgyz politician and founder of Tengir Ordo
- Suleimenov, Olzhas, Kazakh poet and Turkologist
- Tschinag, Galsan, Tuvan-Mongolian writer, activist, and shaman

== Wicca ==
Wiccans include:

- Adler, Margot, author, journalist, Wiccan priestess and elder, National Public Radio correspondent in New York City
- Baudino, Gael, author, mostly fantasy (Dianic Wiccan)
- Beyerl, Paul, founder of the Rowan Tree Church
- Bone, Gavin, Wiccan author and lecturer
- Buckland, Raymond, author of Buckland's Complete Book of Witchcraft and many others, and founder of Seax-Wica
- Budapest, Z., pagan teacher and writer (Dianic Wicca)
- Cabot, Laurie, official witch of Salem, author of Power of the Witch and Love Magic
- Close, Del, considered one of the premier influences on modern improvisational theater.
- Cunningham, Scott, author of Wicca: A Guide for the Solitary Practitioner and over 30 other titles on Wicca and other pagan religions
- Dunwich, Gerina, author of Wicca Craft and other books on the details of spellwork
- Erna, Sully, lead singer of Godsmack
- Fallingstar, Cerridwen, author of The Heart of the Fire
- Farrar, Janet, author
- Farrar, Stewart, author
- Firefox, LaSara, author
- Frost, Gavin and Frost, Yvonne, founders of the Church and School of Wicca
- Gardner, Gerald, founder of modern Wicca
- Grimassi, Raven, author on Stregheria and family witchcraft
- Horne, Fiona, author of Witch: A Personal Journey and other books on Wicca
- Inkubus Sukkubus, musical group
- Lipp, Deborah, author of books on Wicca
- Martello, Leo, American author
- Mayhem, Monica, Australian author, singer, model, actress and retired pornographic actress
- McCollum, Patrick, Wiccan prison chaplain
- Omnia, musical group
- Queen, Carol, author, editor, sociologist and sexologist
- Ravenwolf, Silver, controversial Wiccan author and contributor to the New Generation of Wicca and part of the Black Forest Clan
- Sanders, Alex, founder of the Alexandrian tradition of Wicca
- Sanders, Maxine, co-founder of the Alexandrian tradition
- Valiente, Doreen, author and contemporary of Gardner
- Curott, Phyllis, shamanic Wiccan. Founder of the tradition of Ara and author of Book of Shadows, WitchCrafting, and The Love Spell.

== Various or unspecified ==
- Adunis, Syrian poet
- Ra Un Nefer Amen, Kemetism
- Kenneth Anger, American filmmaker and writer
- Gabriel André Aucler, also known as Quintus Nautius, French lawyer during the First Republic
- Anzori Barkalaja, Estonian folklorist, Maavalla Koda
- Alain de Benoist, French writer and publisher
- Manfred Böckl, German writer, Celtic paganism in Bavaria
- Cau, Jean, French writer and journalist
- Aki Cederberg, Finnish writer, musician and filmmaker
- Jan De Zutter, Belgian writer, journalist, political official and artist
- Kalle Eller, Estonian publisher and poet, Maavalla Koda
- Selena Fox, one of the founders of Circle Sanctuary
- Christopher Gérard, Belgian writer and critic
- Marian Green, author, founder of Quest Conference and journal, former editor of Pagan Dawn and former member of the Pagan Federation Council
- Graham Harvey, English religious studies scholar
- Andres Heinapuu, Estonian bibliographer and politician, Maavalla Koda
- Sigrid Hunke, German writer
- Paul Huson, author of Mastering Witchcraft, Mystical Origins of the Tarot, and other titles
- Thibault Isabel, French writer and publisher
- Patricia Kennealy-Morrison – Celtic pagan high priestess, rock critic, author of The Keltiad series of science fiction/fantasy novels, and Strange Days – My Life With and Without Jim Morrison
- Ludwig Klages, German philosopher
- Sharon Knight, Celtic / rock musician, songwriter, producer; front person of the pagan rock band Pandemonaeon; Feri initiate
- Marta Lepp, Estonian writer and teacher
- Jean-François Lyotard, French philosopher
- Jeff McBride, American magician
- Addold Mossin, Estonian activist, Maavalla Koda
- Baal Müller, German writer and publisher
- Fernando Pessoa, Portuguese writer
- Eric Steven Raymond, programmer and author of The Hacker's Dictionary and How to Be a Hacker
- Hugues Rebell, French writer
- Maurice Rollet, French poet, activist and medical doctor
- Paolo Rustichelli, eclectic composer
- Sexton, John W., Irish poet
- Monica Sjöö, Swedish artist and writer
- Starhawk, activist, anarchist and author of The Spiral Dance, Dreaming the Dark, Webs of Power, etc.; one of the original members of the Reclaiming Collective
- Robert Steuckers, Belgian writer and activist
- Dominique Venner, French historian, journalist and essayist
- York, Michael, American scholar
- Oberon Zell-Ravenheart, Church of All Worlds
- Morning Glory Zell-Ravenheart, Church of All Worlds
