= Slavic Native Faith in Poland =

The Slavic Native Faith in Poland (Rodnovery; Polish: Rodzimowierstwo) has, in 2007, between 2000 and 2500 "actively engaged and regular participants". In 2020, Konrad Kośnik and Elżbieta Hornowska estimated that Rodnovers in Poland were between 7000 and 10,000.

== History ==
In 1818, the Polish folklorist and Slavophile Zorian Dołęga-Chodakowski (pseudonym of Adam Czarnocki; 1784–1825) stated that Poland "must return to [the] native faith". According to that, he's recognised as precursor of the Slavic Native Faith in Poland. Another precursor in Poland was Jan Sas Zubrzycki (1860–1935), who elaborated the doctrine of Bogoznawstwo (Polish calque of theology).

In the interwar period, a few movements emerged in Poland, recognized as early Polish Slavic Native Faith followers: the Święte Koło Czcicieli Światowida ("Holy Circle of Worshippers of Svetovid"; 1921) of Władysław Kołodziej (1897–1978), Demiurg (1934), and Zadrugism (1937) of Jan Stachniuk (1905–1963). Another example is the pilot and army officer Zdzisław Harlender (1898–1939), who advocated Polish Native Faith in his book Czciciele Dadźbóg Swarożyca ("Worshipers of Dadźbóg Swarożyc", 1937).

The rapper and music producer Donatan is a self-declared adherent of Slavic Native Faith. He released his debut album Równonoc (English: Equinox) in 2012 and is a prolific music producer in Poland; he produced the song "My Słowianie (We Are Slavic)" which represented Poland at the Eurovision Song Contest 2014.

== Demographics ==
In 2013, Simpson noted that Slavic Native Faith remains a "very small religion" in Poland, which is otherwise dominated by Roman Catholicism. He suggested that there were under 900 regularly active members of the main four registered Polish Native Faith organisations, and around as many adherents belonging to smaller, unregistered groups.

In 2017, he stated that between 2000 and 2500 "actively engaged and regular participants" were likely active in the country. In 2020, Konrad Kośnik and Elżbieta Hornowska estimated between 7000 and 10,000 Rodnovers in Poland.

Simpson observed that in the country, Slavic Native Faith's adherents were "still relatively young", and saw an overlap with the community of historical re-enactors. Kosnik and Hornowska observed that despite being young, Polish Rodnovers were spiritually mature and had joined the religion as it satisfied deep personal needs. They also observed that males constituted the majority of the community.

== Rodnover organisations in Poland ==
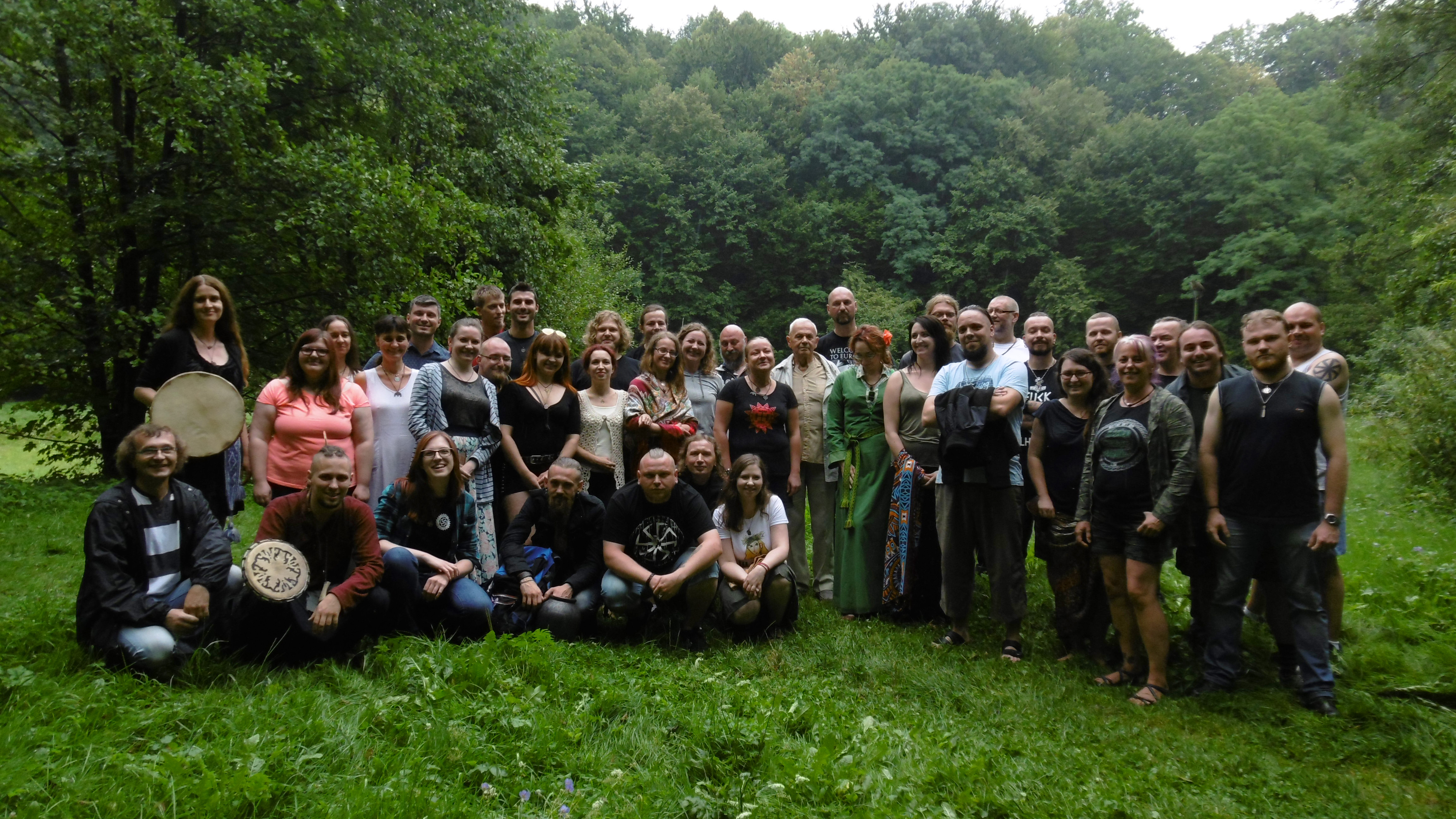
V Poland-wide Slavic Native Faith Congress

The major organisation of Rodnovery in Poland is the Rodnover Confederation.

There are five formally registered religious organisations:

- Native Polish Church;
- Polish Slavic Church;
- Religious Organisation of Polish Rodnovers "Rod";
- Rodzima Wiara ("Native Faith");
- West-Slavic Religious Organization "Slavic Faith".

== See also ==
- Slavic Native Faith
- Slavic Native Faith in Russia
- Slavic Native Faith in Ukraine
