= O Sławiańszczyźnie przed chrześcijaństwem =

Polish paganism treatise

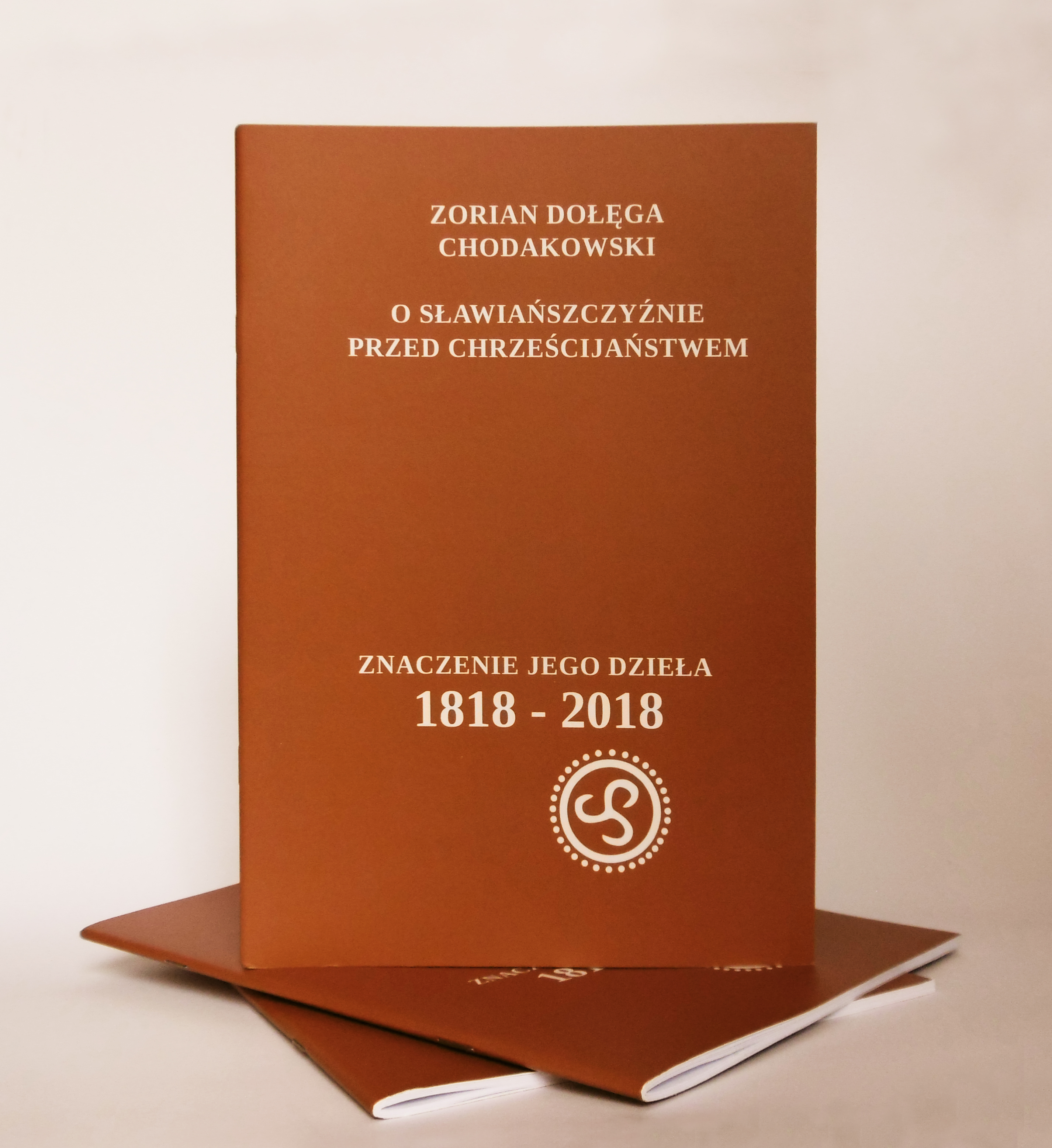
- The 200 year edition of the treatise, with commentary by Stanisław Potrzebowski, published in 2018
- Author: Zorian Dołęga-Chodakowski
- Language: Polish language
- Subject: Slavic paganism
- Genre: Treatise
- Published in: Ćwiczenia Naukowe
- Publication date: 1818
- Pages: 56

O Sławiańszczyźnie przed chrześcijaństwem (transl. On the Slavic World before Christianity) is a treatise written by Zorian Dołęga-Chodakowski, first published in 1818 in issue 5 of the journal Ćwiczenia Naukowe.

The treatise discussed Slavic paganism and heavily influenced the Romanticsm movement in Poland and the creation of the Slavic Native Faith in Eastern Europe.

== Background ==
In the 1810s, Zorian Dołęga-Chodakowski, having deserted from the Russian Imperial Army, devoted himself to travelling. During his travels, he came into contact with Adam Czartoryski, who decided to take his scholarly work under his wing. On his instructions, with a view to researching the historical remains of the ancient Slavs, he travelled to Galicia in 1817 – specifically to Kraków – where he conducted research in archives and libraries. At the same time, he sought funding from the University of Vilnius. In 1818, persuaded by Czartoryski, he wrote in Sieniawa a treatise entitled O Sławiańszczyźnie przed chrześcijaństwem in which he summarised the findings of his research.

== Summary ==
Time will reveal the truth that, from the moment we were first doused with water, all the traits that defined us began to be washed away; our spirit of independence was weakened in many respects, and, as we were educated according to a foreign model, we eventually became strangers to ourselves

— Zorian Dołęga-Chodakowski, O Sławiańszczyźnie przed chrześcijaństwem

Dołęga-Chodakowski's work begins with a reflection on the impact of the adoption of Christianity on the identity of the Slavic peoples – in his view, this event made the Slavs "strangers to themselves" due to the severing of ties between generations and the denigration of pre-Christian culture and history. Added to this is the fact that Slavic culture was incorporated into pan-European culture, within which it was impossible to develop a fully-fledged Slavic cultural formation. In writing about the "spirit of independence" waning under the influence of Christianity, he places the question of restoring ancient beliefs and reclaiming one's own identity within the context of the self-determination of the Slavic nations.

Dołęga-Chodakowski goes on to outline a programme of linguistic research (given language's timeless capacity to preserve cultural content), as well as ethnographic research and research into noble coats of arms, which also preserve traces of ancient beliefs, traditions and events from the history of the Slavic world. The text concludes with a call for archaeological research to be undertaken in order to preserve the material remains of ancient history, and its main message is the assertion that the Slavs must return to their native faith.

== Legacy ==
=== In religious movements ===
In his treatise, Dołęga-Chodakowski challenged existing notions about the benefits that the adoption of Christianity in Poland was supposed to bring, and also became a forerunner of later Slavic movements. He claimed that the new religion had eroded the distinctive characteristics of the Slavs and their cultural heritage; however, elements linked to their previous beliefs had survived in folk culture, and through its extensive study, a spiritual rebirth of the nation would become possible. In it, Dołęga-Chodakowski described himself as a pagan, whilst calling for a return to the religion of the Slavs, thereby going down in history as the first advocate of modern Slavic native faith. His influence was used in the terminology used by the Światowid Worshippers' Circle. Quotations from the treatise also appeared in one version of the creed of the Rodzima Wiara and in the Expanded Statement of Faith of the later Rodzima Wiara.

=== In literature ===
Dołęga-Chodakowski's work served as a source of inspiration for many poets of the Romantic era in Poland (specifically after the November Uprising), who, thanks in part to him, were able to draw on the indigenous culture of the Slavic peoples, thereby contributing to a renewed interest in folklore and, for the first time in centuries, introducing the Polish intellectual elite to concepts rooted in their own pre-Christian culture. This, in turn, led to an increase in the number of academic and popular works on the beliefs of the Slavs. Among those who drew inspiration from Dołęga-Chodakowski were Adam Mickiewicz and Józef Kraszewski, and during the Young Poland period, Stanisław Witkiewicz and Stanisław Wyspiański. Inspired by his work, the magazines Haliczanin and Ziewonia were also founded and published in Lviv.

The treatise itself has been reprinted many times and is highly regarded not only in Poland, but also in Belarus, Lithuania and Ukraine.

== Bibliography ==
- Dołęga-Chodakowski, Zorian (1818). "O Sławiańszczyźnie przed chrześcijaństwem". Ćwiczenia Naukowe. 5. Warszawa.
- Dołęga-Chodakowski, Zorian (2018). "Zorian Dołęga-Chodakowski. Znaczenie jego dzieła 1818-2018". O Sławiańszczyźnie przed chrześcijaństwem. Znaczenie jego dzieła 1818-2018. Wrocław: Rodzima Wiara. p. 27–41. ISBN 978-83-947799-0-0.
- Gajda, Agnieszka (2013). "Romanticism and the Rise of Neopaganism in Nineteenth-Century Central and Eastern Europe: The Polish Case". Modern Pagan and Native Faith Movements in Central and Eastern Europe. Durham: Acumen. p. 44–61. ISBN 9781844656622.
- Potrzebowski, Stanisław (2016). "Poprzednicy Zadrugi". Słowiański ruch Zadruga. Szczecin: Wydawnictwo Triglav. p. 11–12. ISBN 978-83-62586-96-7.
- Simpson, Scott (2000). "Zorian Dołęga-Chodakowski (Pseudonym of Adam Czarnocki, 1784–1825)". Native Faith. Polish Neo-Paganism at the Brink of the 21st Century. Religiologica Juventa. Kraków: Zakład Wydawniczy Nomos. p. 50–51. ISBN 83-88508-07-5.
