= Philip Carr-Gomm =

English writer (b. 1955)

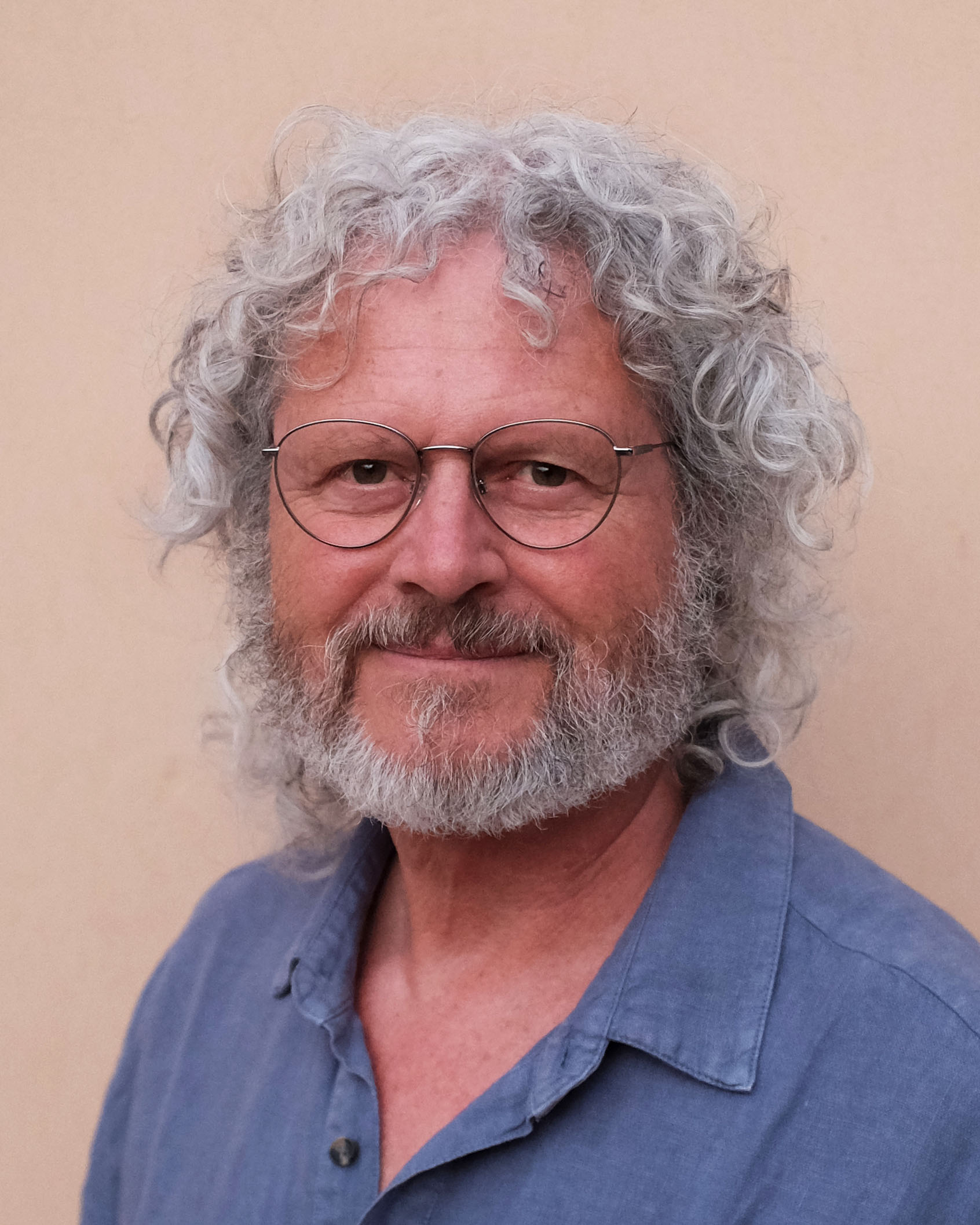

Chosen Chief of the Order of Bards, Ovates and Druids
- In office 1988 – June 2020
- Preceded by: Ross Nichols
- Succeeded by: Eimear Burke

Personal details
- Born: 31 January 1952 (age 74) London, England
- Occupation: Psychologist, Writer

Philip Carr-Gomm (born 31 January 1952) is an English writer in the fields of psychology and Druidry, a psychologist, and one of the leaders and former Chosen Chief of The Order of Bards, Ovates and Druids.

== Early life and education ==
Philip Carr-Gomm was born in London, raised in Notting Hill Gate, and educated at Westminster School and University College London. His father was Francis Eardley Carr-Gomm, brother of humanitarian Richard Carr-Gomm.

He met his first spiritual teacher, Ross Nichols, the founder of The Order of Bards, Ovates and Druids, when he was 11. He began studying with him when a teenager, and joined the Order when he was 18. He studied meditation with Olivia Robertson in Ireland, who later founded the Fellowship of Isis, and in his twenties he founded The Esoteric Society in London, which organised journeys for members to Bulgaria and Egypt, and hosted talks by well-known authors such as Gareth Knight, W. E. Butler, and Arthur Guirdham.

== Spirituality ==
In 1975 Nichols died, and Carr-Gomm followed a Bulgarian teacher, Omraam Mikhael Aivanhov for seven years, giving talks on his teachings and helping with the translation and publishing of his books into English. He also travelled to Bulgaria and studied the work of Aivanhov's teacher, Peter Deunov, visiting Sofia annually for fourteen years, teaching Deunov's Paneurhythmy dance in England and at Findhorn in Scotland. In his thirties he turned to a study of psychology, taking a BSc degree at University College London and Jungian analysis, with plans to become an analyst. On discovering Psychosynthesis, he trained instead as a therapist at the Institute of Psychosynthesis in London and began a private practice.

In 1988 he was asked to lead the Order of Bards, Ovates and Druids. He organised the Order's teachings into a distance-learning course, and edited Nichols' Book of Druidry with John Matthews. Since that time, the Order has grown to become the largest Druid teaching order in the world, with Professor of History Ronald Hutton writing that 'the OBOD correspondence course arguably represents one of the major documents of British spirituality from the late twentieth century'.

In 2021 the new "Chosen Chief of OBOD", Eimear Burke, was installed in the presence of Dave Smith (Damh the Bard), the Order's Pendragon, and Stephanie Carr Gomm, the Order's scribe. Immediately preceding this Philip Carr Gomm gave a short farewell speech regarding his thirty two years in the role of Chosen Chief of OBOD. Carr Gomm made a broadcast at the beginning of the week in the Tea with a Druid Series, No. 128, addressing the current world situation and the need for peace in terms of the traditional druid's prayer and oath.

== Druidcraft ==
Druidcraft is a spiritual practice embracing elements of both Druidry and Wicca, developed by Philip Carr-Gomm, and is also the title of a book he wrote about the same topic. That book deals with the combination of druidry and wicca in a new, combined practice. Within this book, Carr-Gomm claims that the differences between Wicca and Druidry do not stem from hundreds or thousands of years worth of tradition as these two distinct paths evolved separately. He claims that in fact the differences between modern Wicca and Druidism are due to the differences between two friends, Gerald Gardner and Ross Nichols who were deeply involved with these paths less than 75 years ago.

== Publications ==
- Paneurythmy, Privately published. 1980.
- Special Times: Listening to Children, with Dr. Rachel Pinney and Meg Robinson, The Children's Hours Trust 1985.
- When the Flame and the Rose are One: Etchings by Liuben Dimanov with excerpts from letters by Rainer Maria Rilke edited and introduced by Philip Carr-Gomm. (Privately published 1986, Limited edition of 100 copies, each with twenty lithographs signed by the artist).
- The Elements of the Druid Tradition, Element Books 1991. ISBN 1-85230-202-X
- The Druid Way, Element Books 1993, Thoth Publications 2006. ISBN 1-85230-365-4
- The Druid Animal Oracle, with Stephanie Carr-Gomm, Simon & Schuster, Fireside Books, USA and Australia 1994. Connections Publishing UK 1996.
- The Druid Renaissance ed. Thorsons, HarperCollins, 1996. [Re-issued as The Rebirth of Druidry – Ancient Earth Wisdom for Today, 2003]
- La Force des Celtes: L’Heritage Druidique — Entretiens avec Philip Carr-Gomm, Paco Rabanne and Philip Carr-Gomm, Michel Lafon, Paris 1996.
- In The Grove of the Druids: The Druid Teachings of Ross Nichols, Watkins Books, 2002. ISBN 1-84293-032-X
- Druidcraft: The Magic of Wicca & Druidry, Thorsons, HarperCollins, 2002. ISBN 0-00-713388-X
- Druid Mysteries: Ancient Wisdom for the 21st Century, Rider, Random House, 2002. ISBN 0-7126-6110-7
- The DruidCraft Tarot, with Stephanie Carr-Gomm, St.Martin's Press, New York, 2004.
- What do Druids Believe? Granta, 2005.
- The Druid Plant Oracle, with Stephanie Carr-Gomm, St.Martin's Press, New York, 2008.
- Sacred Places: Sites of Spiritual Pilgrimage from Stonehenge to Santiago de Compostela, Quercus, 2008.
- The Book of English Magic, with Sir Richard Heygate, John Murray, 2009.
- Journeys of the Soul: The Life and Legacy of a Druid Chief, Oak Tree Press, 2010.
- A Brief History of Nakedness, Reaktion Books, 2010.
- The Prophecies, Oak Tree Press, 2016.
- Cosmiel's Gift: An excerpt from The Prophecies with images by Angela Lemaire, Oak Tree Press, 2016.
- Lessons in Magic, Oak Tree Press, 2016.
- The Opera Tarot, paintings by Linda Sutton, text by Philip Carr-Gomm & Linda Sutton, Villa Rondine Press, 2017.
- The Winged Psyche, Oak Tree Press, 2018.
- Seek Teachings Everywhere: Combining Druid Spirituality with Other Traditions, Oak Tree Press, 2019.
- Empower Your Life with Sophrology, CICO Books, 2019.
- The Seven Valleys with RoMa Johnson, Oak Tree Press, 2021.
- The Gift of the Night: A Six-Step Program for Better Sleep, Findhorn Press, 2023.
