= Czarnocki =

Czarnocki, feminine: Czarnocka is a Polish surname. Notable people with the surname include:

- Adam Czarnocki, birth name of Zorian Dołęga-Chodakowski, Polish ethnographer and archaeologist
- Jan Czarnocki (1889–1951), Polish geologist
- Stefan Czarnocki (1878–1947), Polish geologist
- Wanda Czarnocka-Karpińska (1894–1971), Polish physician, expert in sports medicine
- Wiktor Czarnocki, Polish World War I military commander, engineer agronomist
- Zbigniew Czarnocki, Polish chemist
