= Association of Friends of India and South Asia =

Association of Friends of India and South Asia Shamiana
- Logo of the Association of Friends of India and South Asia Shamiana (2014)
- Type: Non-governmental organization
- Headquarters: Warsaw
- Region served: Poland
- President: Anna Piekarska
- Secretary: Manoj Nair

Association of Friends of India and South Asia Shamiana (Polish: Stowarzyszenie Przyjaciół Indii i Azji Południowej – Shamiana) is a non-governmental Polish umbrella organization of various cultural groups of South Asian origin, aimed at organizing seminars, shows at art galleries, music concerts in Poland and promoting Poland and its culture in South Asian countries. Shamiana, the Association of Friends of South Asia, promotes and fosters the integration of the Polish and South Asians in Poland. Moreover, it plans to acquaint South Asians with Polish customs and traditions.

== History ==
The Association of Friends of India and South Asia "SHAMIANA" was formed in Warsaw by a group of five Polish and Indian activists in an effort to bring the cultures of Poland and South Asia together. The participating countries are India, Afghanistan, Bangladesh, Bhutan, Maldives, Nepal, Pakistan and Sri Lanka. The head of the Association (as of 2009) has been Anna Piekarska, with Manoj Nair, as General Secretary.

Relations between Poland and the countries of Indian subcontinent are deeply rooted characterized by understanding and cooperation. In 1820 the first "History of Ancient India" by Polish historian Joachim Lelewel was published. A chair of Sanskrit was set up at the Jagiellonian University of Kraków as far back as 1893.

== Aims and objectives ==
Shamiana is a voluntary, incorporated NGO association based in Poland and strives to be a not-for-profit, non-political and non-sectarian organization and to be transparent and accountable for its activities. Shamiana aims to promote and catalyse universal education among underprivileged children, create the process to embrace these children into mainstream in a sustained manner, facilitate them to emerge as productive assets, and set the foundation for nation building. The objectives of the Association are:

- Enriching, projecting and promoting the positive image of the Republic of India and other South Asian countries in Poland.
- Promoting Indian and South Asian culture and art in Poland.
- Organizing symposia and conferences dedicated to Polish and South Asian countries and their mutual cooperation.
- Supporting cultural and educational initiatives concerning the culture of India and other South Asian countries.
- Educating the Polish media and the general public about the message of Indian and South Asian culture and civilization in order to strengthen the attitude of tolerance and understanding towards the culturally different nations and societies.
- Promoting bilateral and multilateral cooperation between the Republic of Poland and the Republic of India as well as other South Asian countries.
- Offering solutions concerning the economic cooperation between South Asian countries and the government of the Republic of Poland.
- Educating the media and the general public in India and other South Asian countries about the Polish culture.
- Promoting Polish culture and art in India and South Asia.
- Fostering the exchange of experiences and cooperation in the field of science, culture, tourism, economy and sports between Poland and India and other South Asian countries.
- Offering help and support to the business community from India and South Asia planning to invest in Poland and vice versa.
- Granting awards to outstanding personalities from Poland and South Asian countries as well as to institutions contributing to the development of cooperation and establishing cultural links between Poland and India and other South Asian countries.
- Providing a forum for participation in matters of South Asian and Polish culture, science and economy organizing presentations of papers, lectures, courses, conferences, festivals, congresses, exhibitions and other cultural activities including annual conferences of the Society members.
