= Potrzebowski =

Potrzebowski (feminine: Potrzebowska; plural: Potrzebowscy) is a Polish surname. Notable people with the surname include:

- Edmund Potrzebowski (1926–2012), Polish middle-distance runner
- Stanisław Potrzebowski (born 1937), Polish neopagan leader
