= Eimear Burke =

Irish psychologist and musician

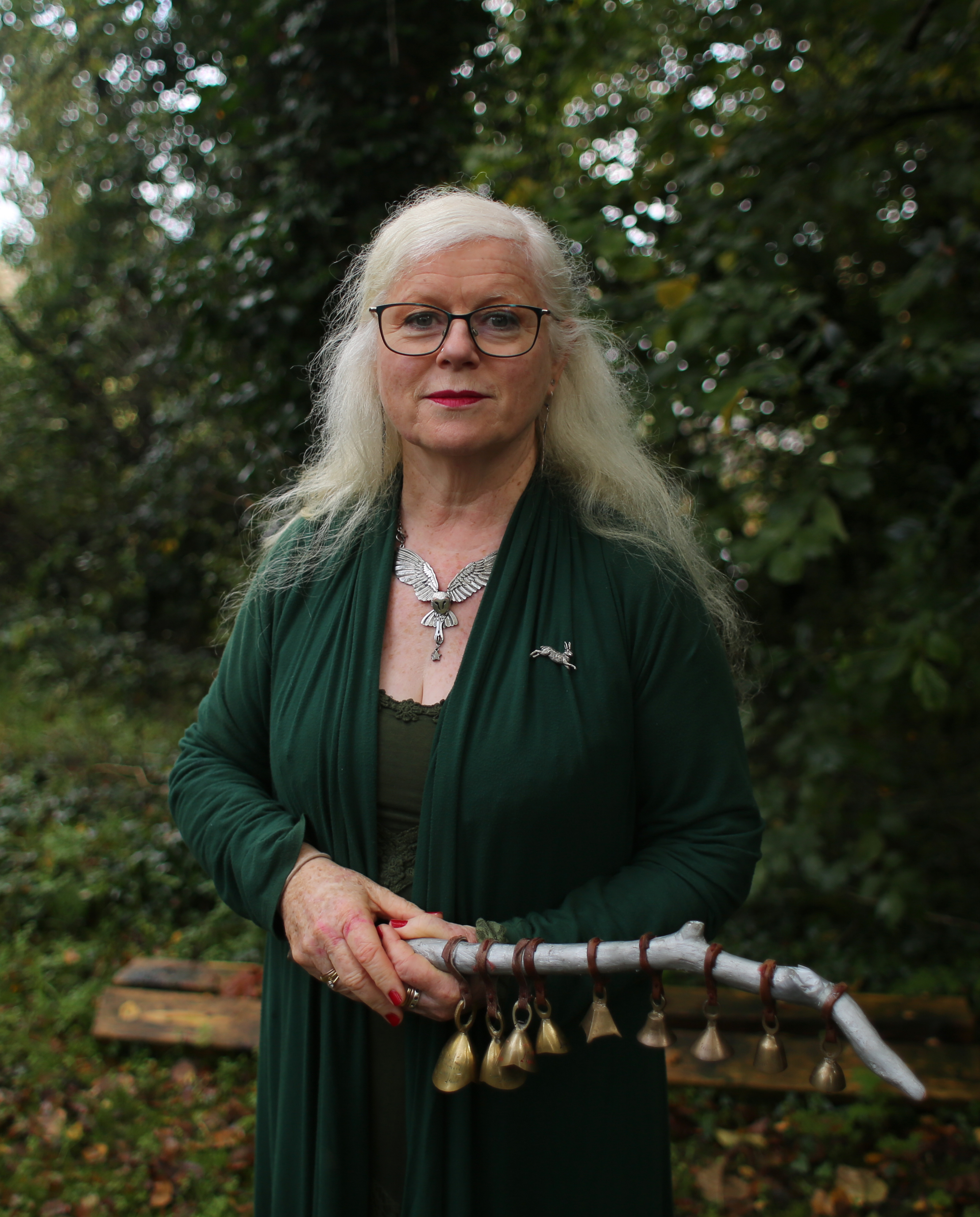

Chosen Chief of the Order of Bards, Ovates and Druids
- Incumbent
- Assumed office June 2020
- Preceded by: Philip Carr-Gomm

Eimear Burke is an Irish psychologist and musician who has served as the Chosen Chief of the Order of Bards, Ovates and Druids since 2020.

== Early life and education ==
Burke was raised in rural Ireland in a Christian household, but was agnostic from an early age. In 1988, she graduated from Trinity College, Dublin, with a degree in psychology, after which she worked in healthcare in Lesotho, where she first encountered indigenous healing methods. Burke received a MSc in Counselling Psychology in 1993, before setting up a private psychology practise. She worked as a guest lecturer at Trinity College for 6 years, in addition to teaching Human Development in both Dublin and Tanzania. Through her encounters with traditional healers in Africa, Burke was introduced to the common threads between indigenous African traditions and druidry.

== Druidry ==
=== Early work ===
Burke became a member of the Order of Bards, Ovates and Druids in 2003, later joining a grove in Kilkenny, frequently leading ceremonies to mark the Wheel of the Year. Alongside her late husband, Howard, she founded a Druid College based in Kilkenny in 2010. She also works as a celebrant.

=== Chosen Chief ===
She was announced as Chosen Chief in 2018, taking up the office in 2020. Due to the coronavirus pandemic, her confirmation was postponed to the Order's 2022 Summer Gathering in Glastonbury, where a ceremony took place. Since taking office, Burke leads weekly fireside chats, which are streamed online and are publicly available.
