= Order of Bards, Ovates and Druids =

British Neo-Druidic organisation

The Order of Bards, Ovates and Druids
- The awen of the Order
- Abbreviation: OBOD
- Formation: 1964, split from The Druid Order
- Founder: Ross Nichols, later refounded by Philip Carr-Gomm
- Type: Spiritual order
- Headquarters: East Sussex, United Kingdom
- Members: 42,000
- Chosen Chief: Eimear Burke
- Pendragon: Matt McCabe
- Scribe: Andrew Anderson
- Ollamh: Ronald Hutton
- Website: https://druidry.org/

The Order of Bards, Ovates & Druids or OBOD is a Neo-Druidic order based in England. It has grown to become a dynamic druid organisation and is the largest druid organisation in the world with over 30,000 members globally.

An esoteric spiritual order, OBOD aims to reunite people with nature and to encourage members to explore their own spiritual paths by engaging with poetry, myth, ritual and community action.

== Background ==
The concept of the three roles of Bards, Ovates and Druids originates from the writings of the ancient Greek historian and geographer Strabo, who in his Geographica, written in the 20s CE, stated that amongst the Gauls, there were three types of honoured figures: the poets and singers known as bardoi, the diviners and specialists in the natural world known as o'vateis, and those who studied "moral philosophy", the druidai. Nonetheless, Strabo's accuracy has been called into question, as he was not actually well acquainted with Gaul and was likely relying on earlier sources whose accuracy is also disputed.

OBOD was founded in 1964 as a split from the Ancient Druid Order with Ross Nichols as its leader. Where past druidic organisations across Britain, such as the aforementioned Ancient Druid Order or the Welsh Gorsedd, had been influenced by Freemasonry and Christianity, OBOD has established itself as a nature-based religion, taking more overt inspiration from Celtic literature such as the Mabinogion.

Nichols died in 1975 at the age of 72. In 1988, Philip Carr-Gomm, who had trained with Nichols from a young age, was asked to lead the Order. A psychologist with training in Psychosynthesis, Carr-Gomm developed the Order’s teachings by introducing perspectives drawn from Jungian psychology, spiritual psychology, and developments in archaeology, history, and Celtic studies.

OBOD is registered as a not-for-profit Community Interest Company (CIC) in the United Kingdom. Although administered in England, its membership is international with communities, camps and other events in other countries including the Australia, France, Germany, Italy, Netherlands, Portugal and the United States.

== Teachings ==
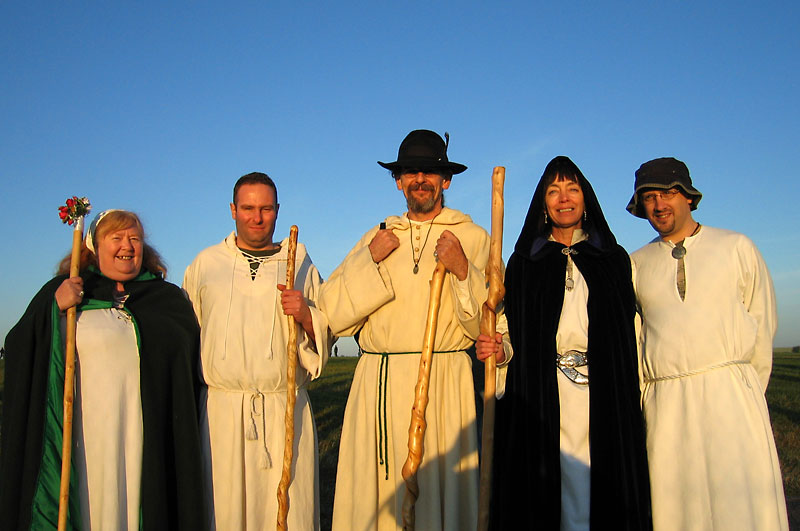
A group of Neo-druids from the Sylvan Grove of the OBOD at Stonehenge on the morning of the summer solstice 2005

The teachings of the Order could be seen as typical of neo-druidism today, in that it teaches its followers the belief of the sanctity of nature and a belief in the Otherworld. Although its teaching draws upon Celtic sources, it also allows evolution, considering for instance several ideas from modern psychology and the Human Potential movement, and from perennialist thinkers such as Aldous Huxley and Frithjof Schuon.

Individual Druids and the groups that they practice with are allowed to decide their own pantheons. Many members follow Celtic pantheons, usually relating to the four pre-Christian Celtic nations of England, Scotland, Wales and Ireland, as well as related beliefs and practices, such as ancestral worship, naturism, polytheism and Spiritualism. The Order's official teachings, however, are presented ecumenically as a spiritual philosophy compatible with many religious beliefs, and other members hold monotheistic, pantheistic, atheistic, and other views. Many OBOD Druids identify as Pagan, but others identify as Christian, Jewish, Buddhist, Hindu, or many other religions, while some follow Druidry as their primary or only spiritual path.

The Bardic, Ovate and Druid courses are also offered in other six languages: Dutch, English, French, German, Italian and Portuguese.

=== Awen and Nwyfre ===
Central to ceremonies are the energies of awen and nwyfre, both originating in folklore and writings of Ancient Britain, such as the Mabinogion. Often chanted three times in ceremony, awen is an energy of creative inspiration and is an important element to support the bardic tradition which the Order foregrounds. Nwyfre, on the other hand, is a constant life-force, which druids believe flows through everyone and must be nurtured through mindfulness, often achieved through meditation.

== Participation ==
The OBOD teachings are available principally in the form of a distance-learning course available online or by mail. There is a network of mentors, many using email, to support the students’ progress through the grades of Bard, Ovate and Druid. Members meet at camps, at workshops and assemblies in various parts of the world, and a network of over 350 groves and seed groups exists across the world. There are a number of internet forums, held on the Druid Hearth - a private members’ website in addition to OBOD's public-access site, and a monthly journal Touchstone.

OBOD also supports a substantial online community through the Druid Hearth, which enables members to move between studying online teachings, receiving messages, participating in workshops and live events, reading journals, and joining special-interest groups.

Some members of the Order prefer to learn at home, solitary, as opposed to other modern Druids who meet regularly in their local Groves or online, and to Druids of early pre-Christian Britain who are thought to have congregated to share wisdom or meet for occasion. Members are sent course information and materials in multiple packs, depending on the grade which they are enrolled in, and may be assigned a tutor if they wish to have someone to communicate with.

=== Groves ===
Members may choose to join a grove - which can describe both a physical place (often a forest clearing or field) or a collection of druids - in order to celebrate events on the Wheel of the Year, including the equinoxes and solstices. With the introduction of the Druid Hearth, online-only groves have also been created to facilitate druid communities online. Hundreds of groves exist across the world and members are encouraged to attend different groves, if they wish, as each group has its own approach to performing ceremonies.

It is made clear, however, that group participation is not necessary for performing ceremony; members are told how one's own house could theoretically be a grove, with materials published for individual ceremony alongside guides for group ceremony.

=== Gatherings ===
The Order holds two major gatherings each year, organised around the Summer and Winter solstices. These are almost always held in Glastonbury, with a ceremony sometimes performed at Glastonbury Tor or the Chalice Well Gardens, as well as a larger ceremony at Stonehenge.

The organization has also developed a tradition of seasonal camps. From 1994, for nineteen years, OBOD held camps, usually near the White Horse chalk hill figure in Wiltshire, generally four times a year at Imbolc, Beltane, Lughnasadh, and Samhain. In 2013 an independent group of members continued the project under the name White Horse Camps, often holding events in Shropshire. In 2023 the tradition was continued by another group under the banner Heart of Yew.

== Environmental Work ==
Environmental awareness and tree planting form a significant part of OBOD’s public identity. Since 1988 the Order has promoted a Sacred Grove tree-planting campaign, publishing material on tree planting and making donations to charities including the Woodland Trust, Tree Aid, Trees for Life, and The Children’s Forest. As part of the Order’s fiftieth anniversary celebrations, a Golden Anniversary Grove project was established with Trees for Life, and by 2025 this project had funded the planting of more than 2,500 trees. In 2023 the Order funded the planting of a ring of crab apple trees on National Trust land at the base of Glastonbury Tor.

== Leadership ==
Nichols took on the role as the Order's first chief upon its founding in 1964, leading it until his death in 1974.

In 1988, more than a decade after Nichols' passing, and after study in the Order and helping to further its reaches, Philip Carr-Gomm was asked to lead the Order. Other notable members also hold somewhat senior positions in the order, often with the title of "Honorary Bard". Other senior roles include the Pendragon, currently Damh the Bard, who is involved in the UK groves and running the Order's monthly podcast, Druidcast, as well as the Scribe, currently Stephanie Carr-Gomm.

Eimear Burke was installed as the new Chief of the Order in June 2020. Burke, who had served as leader of the Kilkenny Druid Grove, was named to the position two years prior. Due to the social lockdown caused by the coronavirus, her installation proceeded without the special gathering of OBOD members that had originally been planned. The induction ceremony was broadcast on the Order's YouTube channel, with select leaders present. Burke has been a frequent contributor to OBOD's Tea With A Druid series as well as running a YouTube channel for the Kilkenny Grove. Immediately prior to Burke's installation, Philip Carr-Gomm gave a short farewell speech featuring a musical contribution in the form of bagpipe playing from his friend and trusted Order member, Chris Park.

These senior positions within the Order are not democratically elected by the Order as a whole; rather the present officeholder chooses their successor, which is followed by a period of training, overseen by the present officeholder. Burke underwent two years of training with Carr-Gomm before taking up the office of Chosen Chief.

Vera Chapman was the first Pendragon of the Order before passing the role to Will Worthington in 1991. Worthington illustrated several divination card sets, including The Druid Animal Oracle, The Druid Plant Oracle, and the DruidCraft Tarot, before further passing the role to Dave Smith aka. Damh the Bard in 2010. Smith was responsible for creating DruidCast, a monthly podcast of music and interviews for the Order. In mid-2025, Smith handed over the Pendragon role to Matt McCabe, an orchardist and councillor for North East Somerset.

== Media ==
The Order possesses an online presence regarding Druidic teachings. OBOD has an online library which carries articles on different aspects of Druidry and topics which would be of interest to Druids, including serious scholarly work such as The Mount Haemus Lectures. There is a regular podcast called DruidCast which features music, lectures and an introduction by musician Damh the Bard, which has over 250 episodes recorded. Subjects cover not just Druidry but a wide spectrum of paganism as well as bardic performances. The Order also broadcasts a weekly podcast, Tea With A Druid, which has over 400 episodes. Each episode consists of a story followed by a brief meditation, led by a different member of OBOD each week. Afterwards, a follow up session called Biscuits With A Druid takes place on the Druid Hearth, featuring community engagement, additional meditations and wider discussions about various topics from the main Tea With A Druid podcast livestream.

Each year, the Chosen Chief gives an annual review to detail about the performance of The Order of Bards, Ovates and Druids across the world, including leadership changes, yearly events, special notices and things to expect in the coming year. This was started by the former Chosen Chief, Philip Carr-Gomm, and has been continued by current Chosen Chief, Eimear Burke.

Quarterly journals are also published by members in various parts of the world in addition to Touchstone: Dryade for Dutch-speaking members, Menhir in French, Druidenstein in German, Il Calderone in Italian, Ophiusa in Portuguese and two regional English-language magazines—SerpentStar in Australasia and Druid in North America.

== Notable members ==
- Ronald Hutton, academic and writer
- Phillip Carr-Gomm, former Chosen Chief
- Youth, musician
- Dwina Murphy-Gibb, film producer
- Jamie Reid, visual artist
- Robin Williamson, musician
- Simon Emmerson, musician
- John Michell, author
- Caitlin and John Matthews, writers
- Damh The Bard, musician (former Pendragon)
- Matt McCabe, UK Councillor (current Pendragon)
