= Donald Michael Kraig =

American occult writer

Donald Michael Kraig (March 28, 1951 – March 17, 2014) was an American occult writer and practitioner of ceremonial magic. Kraig published six books, including his 1988 introduction to ceremonial magic, Modern Magick. He was also an editor for Fate Magazine and for his main publisher Llewellyn Worldwide.

== Early life ==
Kraig graduated from UCLA with a degree in philosophy and studied public speaking and music at other colleges and universities. He was initiated into Aridian Witchcraft by author Raven Grimassi, and into American Traditionalist Witchcraft by Scott Cunningham.

== Career ==
After a decade of personal study and practice of the occult, he taught courses in Southern California and at Neo-Pagan festivals and events on topics including Kabbalah, Tarot, Magick, the Lovecraft Mythos, Psychic Development and Tantra, and was an initiated Tantric who ran a lodge of AMOOKOS, an east-west tantric occult group.

Kraig was a member of several spiritual and magical groups. He was a professional musician, as an organist, synthesist, keyboard player, theremin player, and singer. He taught computer skills at the University of Southern California, and was a member of Hollywood's magician club The Magic Castle. He was awarded the honor of Certified Tarot Grand Master by the Associated Readers of Tarot. He was an editor of Fate magazine. Kraig signed to Llewellyn Publications (now Llewellyn Worldwide), publisher or co-publisher of his main books, articles, and tapes; he was editor for The Llewellyn Journal in 2001 and for Llewellyn's New Worlds in 2003.

=== Hypnotherapist ===
He received training and certification as a clinical hypnotherapist by the American Board of Hypnotherapy (ABH), the National Guild of Hypnotists (NGH), and the Association for Integrative Psychology (AIP). He was also certified as a hypnosis instructor by the ABH and as a master practitioner of Neuro-Linguistic Programming (NLP) by the AIP.

=== Media appearances ===
Kraig was a guest on Coast to Coast AM with George Noory, Personal Life Media, The Deviant Minds Salon, Pagans Tonight! on BlogTalk Radio, Sitting Now, and Occultists Radio.

== Death ==
Kraig died March 17, 2014, after battling pancreatic cancer.

== Bibliography ==
Published works include:

=== Books ===
- 1988 Modern Magick: Eleven Lessons in the High Magickal Arts. Llewellyn Publications. ISBN 0-87542-324-8 (2nd edition: 2002) (republished in 2010 re-subtitled: 12 Lessons in the High Magickal Arts.)
- 1990 Magical Diary. Llewellyn Publications. ISBN 0-87542-322-1
- 1994 The Truth About Evocation of Spirits. Llewellyn Publications. ISBN 1-56718-393-X
- 1998 Modern Sex Magick: Secrets of Erotic Spirituality. Llewellyn Publications. ISBN 1-56718-394-8
- 1999 The Truth About Psychic Powers. Llewellyn Publications. ISBN 0-87542-355-8
- 2002 Tarot and Magic. Llewellyn Publications. ISBN 0-7387-0185-8
- 2006 Graeco-Egyptian Magick by Tony Mierzwicki, preface by Donald Michael Kraig. Megalithica Books ISBN 1-905713-03-7, ISBN 978-1-905713-03-5
- 2006 The Encyclopedia of Magic and Alchemy by Rosemary Ellen Guiley, foreword by Donald Michael Kraig, Checkmark Books ISBN 0-8160-6048-7, ISBN 978-0-8160-6048-1
- 2009 The Resurrection Murders. Galde Press ISBN 1-931942-66-8, ISBN 978-1-931942-66-9
- 2015 Modern Tantra. Llewellyn Publications. ISBN 978-0738740164

=== Articles ===
- In Llewellyn Publications' New Worlds:
  - "The World of Magick" in New Worlds #23
  - "The World of Magick" in New Worlds #34
  - "Advanced Magick" in New Worlds #43
  - "Magick and Kindergarten" in New Worlds #44
  - "All Magick Is Sex Magick" in New Worlds #51
- In Llewellyn Publications' The Llewellyn Journal:
  - "Discovering My Ancestors" in The Llewellyn Journal, December 2001
  - "Psychic Attack—First Defense" in The Llewellyn Journal, August 2002
- In Ecstasy Through Tantra by Jonn Mumford
  - "A Tantric Weekend"

=== Discography ===
- Using Modern Magick (companion tape to the book). ACE/Llewellyn Collection, 1988.
- The Golden Dawn: Its History & Its Magick - (lecture tape) ACE
- The Secret of Magickal Evocation - (lecture tape) ACE
- Tantra for the Layperson (lecture tape) ACE
- Tantra without Tears (lecture tape) ACE
- Kabbalistic Numerology (lecture tape) ACE
- Kabbalistic Meditation (lecture tape) ACE
- The Self in Transformation with Halim El-Dabh, Donald Michael Kraig, Jeff Rosenbaum, Joseph Rothenberg and Robert Anton Wilson (Panel Discussion) ACE
- Initiation and Initiatory Orders with Rev. Paul Beyerl, Ian Corrigan Donald Michael Kraig and Liafal (Panel Discussion) ACE
