= Zadruga (movement) =

Polish neopagan nationalist movement

The Movement of Polish Nationalists Zadruga was a Polish neopagan nationalist movement.

== History ==
It was founded in 1937 by Jan Stachniuk. It published a monthly political and cultural bulletin Zadruga. The group that coalesced around this bulletin was the most active neopagan group during the 1918–1939 period in Poland, with around 300 followers in 1939. However, the Zadruga movement never formalized its membership.

During 1945–1947, as part of the Nationalist opposition, Zadruga published the Zryw in Poznań and Arkona journals in Bydgoszcz. The movement leaders were arrested in 1949 by the Communist regime, accused of collaboration with Neo-Fascists, and were imprisoned in 1952.

After the amnesty in 1956, they were released. Rather than resume their former activities, they transformed into an informal intellectual movement, based in Wrocław. Attempts in the 1980s and 1990s to revive the association were not successful.

== Use by later movements ==
After 1989 the elements of Zadruga were used by Bolesław Tejkowski in his ideology of Polish anti-clerical nationalism of the Social-National Union (Unia Społeczno-Narodowa). The ideology was propagated separately by the Toporzeł Publishing House. Many former participants of the informal Zadruga intellectual groups became members of the National Movement (Ruch Narodowy) or of the Nacjonalistyczne Stowarzyszenie Zadruga.

The foundational writings of Stachniuk and Wacyk are used now by certain Polish Slavic native faith groups, especially by the Union of Native Faith (Rodzima Wiara) and by the Association for Tradition and Culture "Niklot" (Stowarzyszenie na rzecz Tradycji i Kultury „Niklot”):.

== Slavic Native Faith ==
Its spiritual guide was Antoni Wacyk, who promoted a return to Slavic native faith. Stachniuk promoted an ideology of culturalism, aiming at the unification of Western Slavic peoples based on the reconstruction of their original national culture. Stachniuk believed that Christianity, especially the Catholic clergy, presented an anti-cultural influence and promoted a culture of laxism, escapism, and consumption. It was believed that unification under the Slavic native faith would prepare these nations for an inevitable confrontation with Russian and German expansionism and that each nation would build its own strength through its collective matrix (a term used in zadruga), after the original Slavic notion of the organization of rural communities. According to the movement, the Western Slavic nations should function as one centralized state with the collective ownership of land and industry, based on grass-roots enthusiasm and heroism.

Stanisław Potrzebowski, the founder of Rodzima Wiara and zadrugist, noticed the influence of the Zadruga movement on Slavic Native Faith, as described in his book Slavic movement Zadruga. He stated that Zadruga and Slavic Native Faith were linked by a common set of values. He expressed an appreciation of the work of Zdzisław Słowiński, founder of Toporzeł Publishing House, which triggered the rebirth of zadrugist thought in the Third Polish Republic from Polish and Ukrainian Rodnover groups. According to Potrzebowski, the founding of World Congress of Ethnic Religions (later European Congress of Ethnic Religions) in 1998 in Vilnius, coincided with Stachniuk's dream of the "renovation of Aryan people's unity" and a number of joint initiatives of Rodnovers from different countries. For example, the Generic Weche of Slavs is a realization of the social-political program of pre-war Zadruga.
