= Jan De Zutter =

Belgian writer, journalist

Jan De Zutter (born 14 June 1962) is a Belgian writer, journalist, political official and artist. He has been a journalist for De Morgen and written several books about neopaganism, which he practices. He has worked for the social democratic party Vooruit in the European Parliament. After suffering a burnout, he began to make pastels which he has exhibited since 2021.

== Early life and education ==
Jan De Zutter was born in Mortsel, Antwerp Province, on 14 June 1962. He studied art history and archeology at Ghent University and obtained an aggregaat. He did post-graduate studies in journalism at the University of Antwerp. He took evening classes in drawing and painting.

== Journalism and writing ==
De Zutter has worked as a journalist, writing for De Morgen and other newspapers. He has written multiple books about the neopagan religion Wicca. His book Heidenen voor het blok (2000, lit. 'Pagans for the block') is about neopagans within the Belgian far-right party Vlaams Blok. As prominent examples, the book names the senator Wim Verreycken, vice chairman Roeland Raes, representatives Francis Van den Eynde and John Spinnewyn, and the municipal councilor Ralf van den Hautte. De Zutter argues that the situation is similar in other European countries and credits right-wing pagans with making environmentalism a more prominent feature of far-right milieus.

== Politics ==
Through his engagement in the social democratic party Vooruit (known as the Socialistische Partij Anders until 2021), De Zutter began to work for the politician Steve Stevaert, for whom he has ghostwritten books. He became a political official for Vooruit in the European Parliament, where he has served as the party's spokesman. He has been a parliamentary assistant to Kathleen Van Brempt.

== Art ==
De Zutter exhibited colour drawings and acrylic paintings during his student years but abandoned art to focus on his career as a journalist. After suffering a burnout, he took up drawing again in 2018 and held an exhibition in 2019. Shortly before the outbreak of the COVID-19 pandemic in Belgium he bought a set of pastel sticks by mistake. He tried them out, became fascinated by the medium and held solo exhibitions of his pastels in 2021 and 2022. He describes himself as a "non-narrative realist" and says his pictures are about the "miracle of the moment". He names the Ghent artist Michel Buylen as an influence and has made his own interpretations of landscape paintings by George Inness and James McNeill Whistler.

== Religious views ==
De Zutter grew up as an agnostic, but rejected that as spiritually and aesthetically limiting in his early 20s. He was initiated into Freemasonry and explored various neopagan and Afro-Caribbean religions. He underwent initiation in a Wicca coven and in the "ritual family" of a Cuban Babalawo. He describes himself as a "liberal-religious omnivore" who is at home in pagan practices.

== Selected publications ==
De Zutter has written the following books.

- De schaduw van de maan: moderne hekserij in Europa, Hadewijch, 1994
- Abracadabra: lexicon van de moderne hekserij, Hadewijch, 1997
- Heidenen voor het blok: radicaal-rechts en het nieuwe heidendom, Houtekiet, 2000
- Eko Eko, een halve eeuw wicca, Houtekiet, 2003
