= Joachim Lelewel =

Polish historian and geographer (1786–1861)

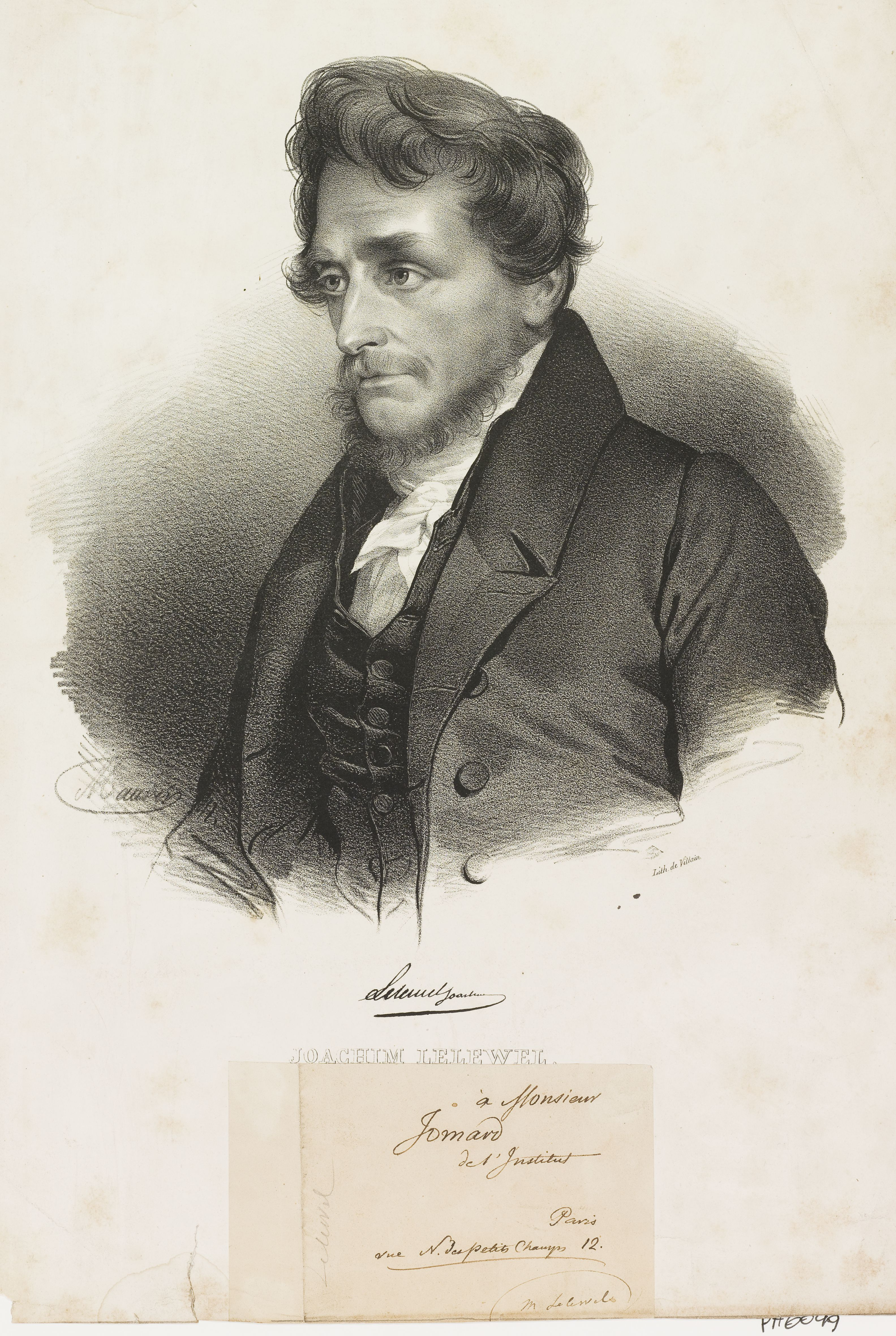
- Born: 22 March 1786; Warsaw, Kingdom of Poland, Polish–Lithuanian Commonwealth
- Died: 29 May 1861 (aged 75); Paris, France
- Resting place: Rossa Cemetery
- Occupations: Historian, bibliographer
- Relatives: Karol Maurycy Lelewel (father)

Academic background
- Influences: Zorian Dołęga-Chodakowski

Academic work
- School or tradition: Romanticism; Lelewel School
- Influenced: Bakunin; Bartoszewicz; Schmitt

Joachim Lelewel (22 March 1786 – 29 May 1861) was a Polish historian, geographer, bibliographer, polyglot and politician.

== Life ==
Born in Warsaw to a Polonised Prussian family,^{[a]} Lelewel was educated at the Imperial University of Vilna, where in 1814 he became a lecturer in history, with a brief sojourn at Warsaw, 1818–1821, where he joined the Warsaw Society of Friends of Learning. His lectures on Polish history created great enthusiasm, as shown in some lines addressed to him by Adam Mickiewicz that led to Lelewel's removal by the Russians in 1824.

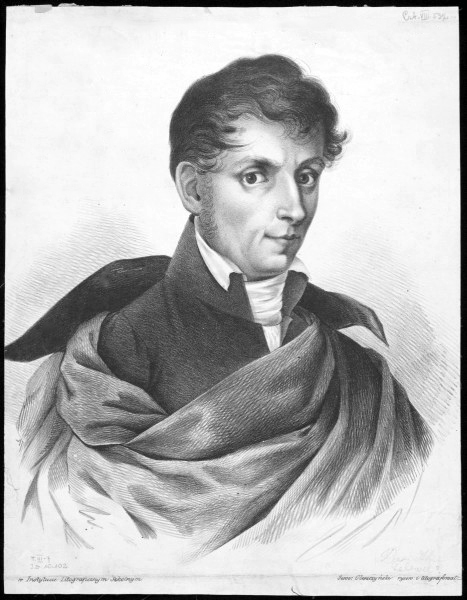
A sketch of Lelewel

Five years later, Lelewel returned to Warsaw, where he was elected a deputy to the Sejm of Congress Poland. He joined the November 1830 Uprising with more enthusiasm than energy, though Tsar Nicholas I identified him as one of the most dangerous rebels. He is considered the author of the motto: "For our freedom and yours". On the suppression of the rebellion, Lelewel made his way in disguise to Germany and subsequently reached Paris in 1831. The government of Louis Philippe ordered him to quit French territory in 1833 at the request of the Russian ambassador. The cause of the expulsion is said to have been his writing of revolutionary proclamations. He went to Brussels, where for nearly thirty years he earned a scanty livelihood by his writings.

In 1846 Lelewel joined the Polish Democratic Association and before the 1846 Kraków uprising he wrote an appeal "To my countrymen in the Ukraine."

In 1847, he, together with Karl Marx and Friedrich Engels, became a founding member and Vizepräses (vice president) of the Demokratische Gesellschaft zur Einigung und Verbrüderung aller Völker (Democratic Society for Unity and Brotherhood of All Peoples), seated in Brussels. The anarchist Michail Bakunin was strongly influenced by him.

During the first years of Alexander II of Russia as the Emperor of Russia, Lelewel laid some hope on the beginning of liberalisation.

Lelewel died 29 May 1861 in Paris, where he had moved a few days earlier. First interred there, his body was transferred to the Rasos Cemetery in Vilnius, in accord with his wishes.

== Works ==
His literary activity in Polish and, to a more international audience in French, was enormous, extending from his Edda skandynawska ("The Scandinavian Edda," 1807) to his Géographie des Arabes (1851). One of his most important publications was La Géographie du moyen âge (5 vols., 1852–1857), with an atlas (1849) of fifty plates entirely engraved by himself, for he attached such importance to the accuracy of his maps that he would not allow them to be executed by anyone else.

His historical works were popular in Ukraine especially among members of the Ruthenian Trinity and the Brotherhood of Saints Cyril and Methodius (particularly historian Mykola Kostomarov).

His works on Polish history are based on minute and critical study of the documents; they were collected under the title Polska, dzieje i rzeczy jej rozpatrzywane (Poland, Her History and Affairs Surveyed), in 20 vols. (1853–1876). He intended to write a complete history of Poland on an extensive scale, but never accomplished the task. His method is shown in the "little history" of Poland, first published at Warsaw in Polish in 1823, under the title Dzieje Polski, and afterwards largely rewritten in the Histoire de Pologne (2 vols., 1844). Other works on Polish history which may be especially mentioned are La Pologne au moyen âge (Poland in the Middle Ages, 3 vols., 1846–1851), an edition of the Chronicle of Matthew Cholewaski (1811) and Ancient Memorials of Polish Legislation (Księgi ustaw polskich i mazowieckich). He also wrote on the trade of Carthage, on the geographer Pytheas of Marseille, and two important works on numismatics (La Numismatique du moyen âge, 2 vols., 1835; Etudes numismatiques, 1840). While employed in the Warsaw University library, he studied bibliography, and the fruits of his labors may be seen in his Bibliograficznych Ksiąg dwoje (Two Bibliographic Books, 2 vols., 1823–1826).

Lelewel wrote an autobiography (Adventures while Prosecuting Researches and Inquiries on Polish Matters), printed in his Polska (Poland).

- Edda czyli Księga religii dawnych Skandynawii mięszkańców (1807).
- Rzut oka na dawnosc litewskich narodow i związki ich z Herulami (1808).
- Uwagi nad Mateuszem herbu Cholewa polskim XII wieku dzieiopisem, a w sczególności nad pierwszą dzieiów iego xięgą (1811).
- Historyka tudzież o łatwem i pozytecznem nauczaniu historyi (1815).
- Joachima Lelewela badania starożytności we względzie geografji (1818).
- Dodatek do Teodora Wagi Historyi książąt i królów polskich: Panowanie Stanislawa Augusta (1819).
- Joachima Lelewela bibljograficznych ksiąg dwoje: Tom 1 (1823) Tom 2 (1826).
- Edda to jest Księga religii dawnych Skandynawii mieszkańców (1828).
- Dzieje bibliotek do Dziennika Warszawskiego (1828).
- Dzieje Polski Joachim Lelewel potocznym sposobem opowiedział, do nich dwanaście krajobrazów skreślił (1829).
- Początkowe prawodawstwa polskie cywilne i kryminalne do czasów jagiellońskich (1829).
- Essai historique sur la législation polonaise civile et criminelle, jusqu’au temps des Jagellons, depuis 730 jusqu’en 1403. Paris, 1830.
- Panowanie króla polskiego Stanisława Augusta Poniatowskiego obejmującé trzydziestoletnie usilności narodu podźwignienia się, ocalénia bytu i niepodległości (1831).
- Numismatique du Moyen-âge, considérée sous le rapport du type. Paris, 1835.
- Polska odradzająca się czyli dzieje polskie od roku 1795 potocznie opowiedziane (1836).
- Joachima Lelewela porównanie dwu powstań narodu polskiego 1794 i 1830–1831 (1840).
- Études numismatiques et archéologiques. Bruxelles, 1841.
- Gilbert de Lannoy i jego podróże (1844).
- Histoire de Pologne Tom 1 (1844) Tom 2 (1844) Atlas (1844).
- Dzieje Litwy i Rusi aż do unii z Polską w Lublinie 1569 zawartej (1844).
- La Pologne au moyen âge. 3 vol. Poznań, 1846.
- Stracone obywatelstwo stanu kmiecego w Polsce (1846).
- Polska wieków średnich czyli Joachima Lelewela w dziejach narodowych polskich postrzeżenia Tom wstępny (1853) Tom 1 (1855) Tom 2 (1847) Tom 3 (1851) Tom 4 (1851).
- Géographie du moyen âge Tome I (1852) Tome II (1852) Tomes III et IV (1852) Épilogue (1852).
- Géographie des Arabes. Paris, 1851.
- Cześć bałwochwalcza Sławian i Polski (1857).
- Lotniki piśmiennictwa tułaczki polskiej (1859).
- Geografja. Opisanie krajów polskich (1859).
- O monetach błaznów i niewiniątek z powodu dzieła Rigollota kilka słów Joachima Lelewela (1860).
- Trzy konstytucje polskie. 1791, 1807, 1815. Poznań, 1861.
- Histoire de la Lithuanie et de la Ruthénie jusqu'a leur union définitive avec la Pologne conclue a Lublin en 1569 (1861).
- Nauki dające poznać zrzódła historyczne (1863).
- Historya Polska do końca panowania Stefana Batorego (1863).
- Dzieje bibliotek (1868).
- Pamiętnik z roku 1830–31 (1924).

== Commemorations ==
A room at Vilnius University library is named in his honor.

== Notes ==
a. Lelewel's original family name was Lölhöffel von Löwensprung. His father, Karl Moritz, left Prussia and became a citizen of the Kingdom of Poland. In 1768 he was recognized as a Polish nobleman and adopted a shortened Polish version of his German name.
