= Angela Lemaire =

British artist and printmaker (1944–2025)

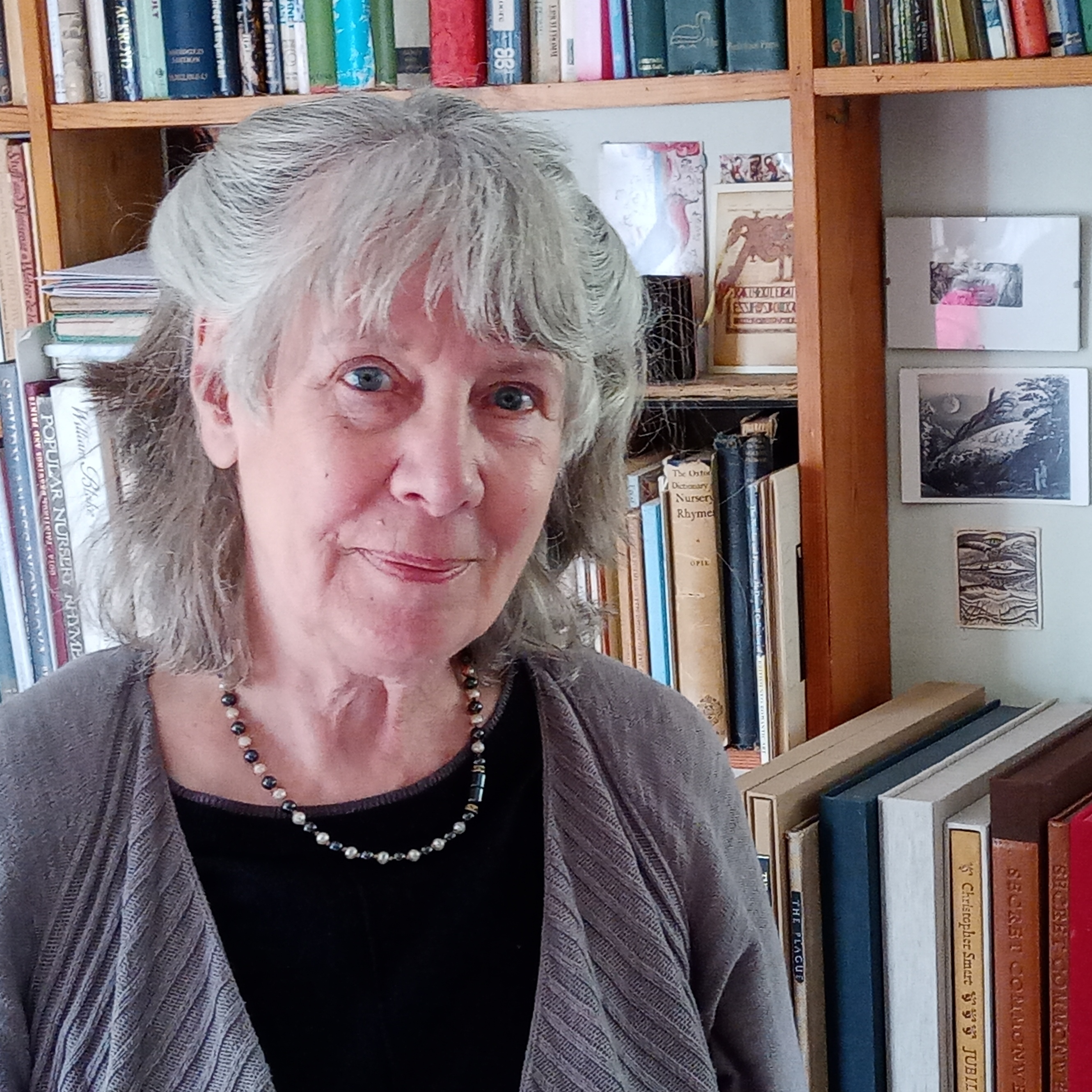
- Born: 27 September 1944; Buckinghamshire, England
- Died: 25 April 2025 (aged 80); Kelso, Scotland
- Occupation: Engraver
- Known for: Wood engraving

Angela Jaqueline Lemaire (27 September 1944 – 25 April 2025) was a British artist and printmaker. Specializing in wood engraving, she lived and worked in the Scottish Borders. She was a member of the Society of Wood Engravers. Her interests included illustrating ancient texts and poems, illustrating the work of authors or poets by commission and creating artist books. For many years, she collaborated with a specialist fine print publisher, The Old Stile Press, that produced handprinted high quality books. Lemaire also created single prints and paintings sometimes to commission.

== Early life and education ==
Lemaire was born in Buckinghamshire on 27 September 1944 to Monica Hope (born Grimble) and Eric Lemaire. Her parents had a messy divorce and her father took custody of she and her brother and was educated in London and Sussex before travelling to Australia. There she attended Pymble Ladies' College, Sydney, returning to the UK in 1962. In 1963 she trained in London at Chelsea College of Arts, then attended Camberwell College of Arts between 1964-1967, gaining a Diploma in Art and Design. There she studied relief printmaking and became interested in wood engraving. She went on to study etching at Morley College. In 1969 she published a book about her unhappy childhood titled "Are You Trying to Annoy Me?" using the nom de plume of Katherine Blake.

== Work ==
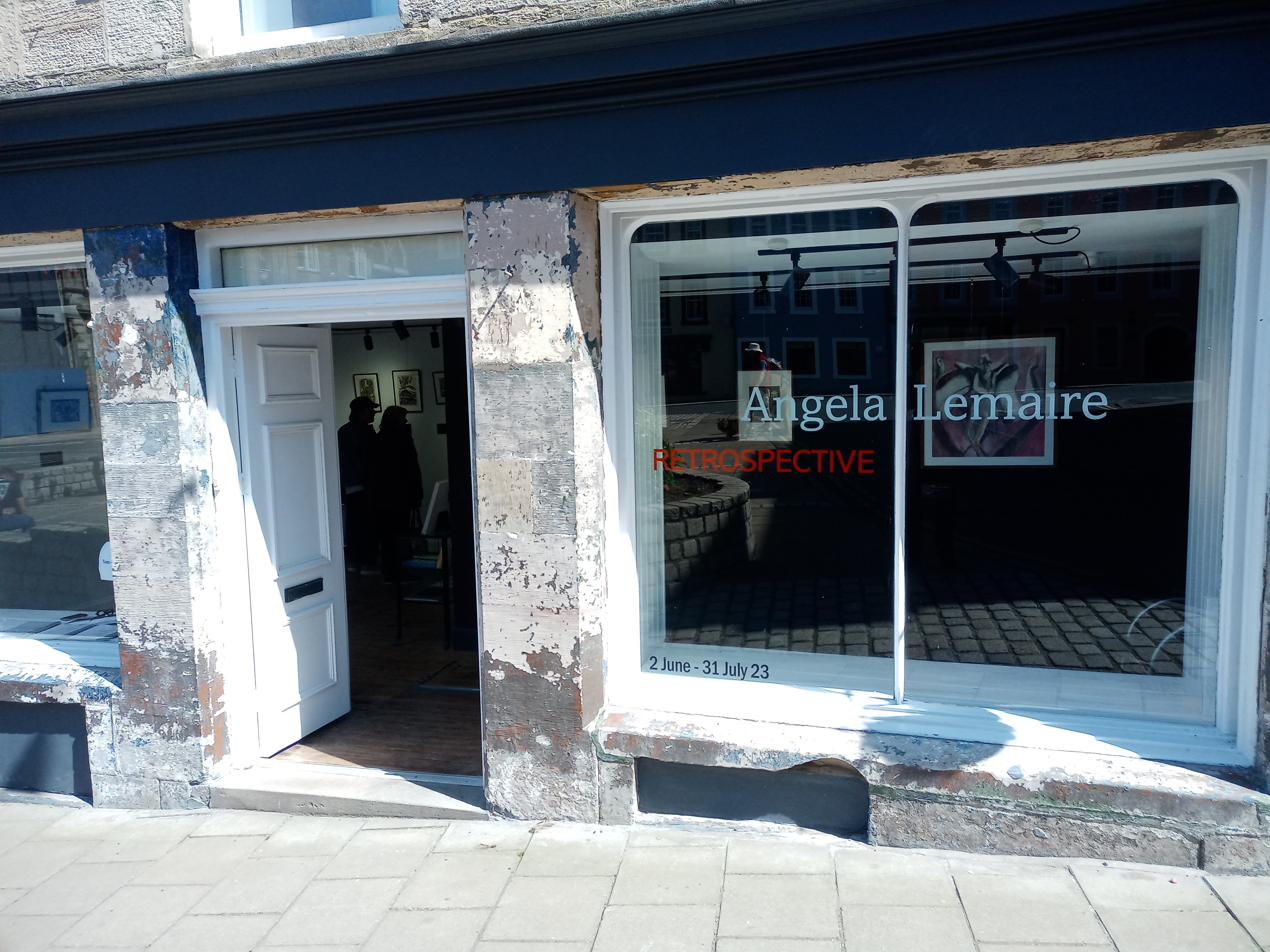
Angela Lemaire exhibition at the HAGB gallery in Jedburgh in 2023

Lemaire's main interest lies in the combination of text and image illustrating literature across the centuries, from Thomas the Rhymer in the 15th century to Ian Hamilton-Finlay in 1992.

Her work has been exhibited in England, Scotland, and abroad, and can be found in public and private collections internationally. The National Library of Scotland holds an archive of her work which includes book drafts, sketchbooks, correspondence and engravings and the Yale Center for British Art holds many of Lemaire's books and wood engravings.

In 2023 Lemaire had a one woman exhibition of her work at the HAGB gallery in Jedburgh.

== Personal life and death ==
Lemaire had a husband, Roddy Macaskill, and they had a son, before they divorced. She died on 25 April 2025, at the age of 80.

== Selected titles ==
- The Pyde Piper: Author Richard Verslegan, written in 1634
- The Plague: devised by Angela Lemaire with essay by Dr Anthony Dyson
- The Journey of Thomas the Rhymer: Thomas of Earlcdune written in 13th century
- Secret Commonwealth: Robert Kirk written in 1691
- Jubilate Agno: Christopher Smart lived (1722 - 1771)
- Joys: Thomas Traherne
- Christmas Sequence: Benjamin Britten (2008)
- Talking Through Trees: Edward Picton-Turbervill (2016)
