= Jan Stachniuk =

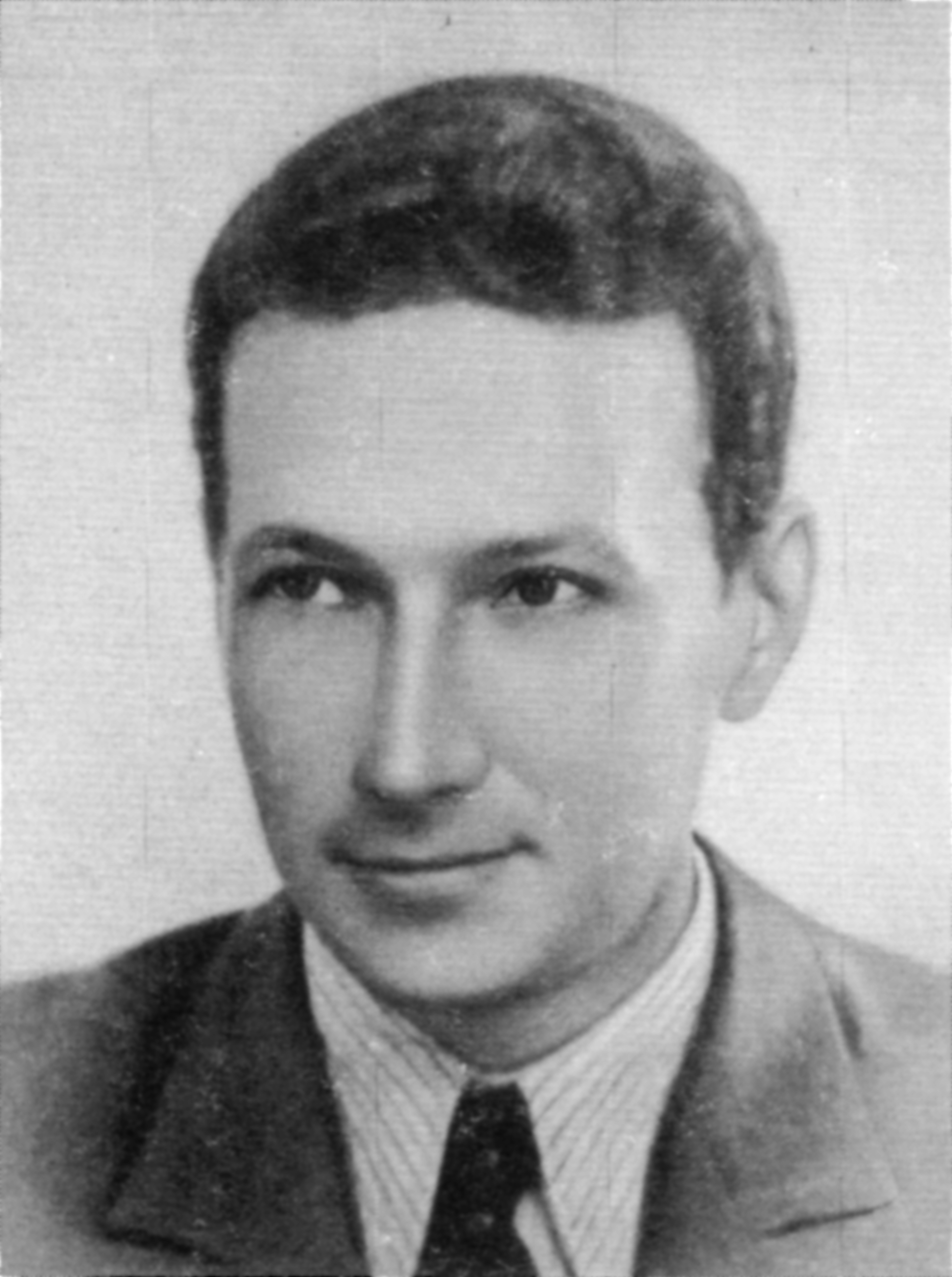
- Born: 13 January 1905; Kovel, Vistula Land, Russian Empire
- Died: 14 August 1963 (aged 58); Warsaw, Poland
- Other names: Stoigniew (pseudonym)

Philosophical work
- Era: 20th-century philosophy
- Region: Western philosophy: Polish philosophy
- School: Culturalism; Neopaganism; Zadrugism
- Main interests: Culture; History; Politics; Religion; Criticism of Catholicism; Slavic paganism
- Notable ideas: Wspakultura

Jan Stachniuk (13 January 1905 – 14 August 1963) was a Polish philosopher, an editor-in-chief of the Polish pre-war nationalist journal Zadruga, the creator of the Zadruga Movement, a theoretician and the founder of culturalism.

Jan Stachniuk was born on 13 January 1905 in Kovel. In 1930 he finished his education at the College of Commerce in Poznań. During World War II, he fought in the ranks of the Home Army.

== Publications ==
- Kolektywizm a naród (Collectivism and the nation), 1933
- Heroiczna wspólnota narodu (Heroic community of nation), 1935
- Państwo a gospodarstwo (State and the economy), 1939
- Dzieje bez dziejów (History without history), 1939
- Mit słowiański (Slavic myth), 2006; written in 1941
- Zagadnienie totalizmu (The question of totalitarianism),1943
- Człowieczeństwo i kultura (Humanity and culture),1946
- Walka o zasady (Fight for principles),1947
- Wspakultura (Back-culture),1948
- Droga rewolucji kulturowej w Polsce (The path of cultural revolution in Poland), 2006; written in 1948
- Chrześcijaństwo a ludzkość (Christianity and humanity), 1997; written in 1949

== See also ==
- Julius Evola
- Franco Freda
- Feliks Koneczny
- Stanisław Szukalski

== Sources ==
- Wacyk, Antoni. Jan Stachniuk 1905-1963. Życie i dzieło [Jan Stachniuk 1905-1963. Live and opus] (in Polish).
