= The Rowan Tree Church =

Coordinates: 47.6883°N 122.1640°W

- Formation: 1979; 47 years ago
- Founded at: Minneapolis
- Type: Wiccan
- Headquarters: Kirkland, Washington
- Website: therowantreechurch.org

The Rowan Tree Church is a Wiccan organization, legally incorporated in 1979. It is an Earth-focused network of Members dedicated to the study and practice of the Wiccan Tradition known as Lothloriën. Originally centered in Minneapolis beginning in the late 1970s, its main office is in Kirkland, Washington. The Rowan Tree Church maintains its network through newsletters, the internet and with an annual retreat (meeting every third year at Old Faithful and, at other times, at The Hermit's Grove in Kirkland, a 1.3-acre (0.53 ha) property). The Rowan Tree Church has an in-depth training program which leads to ordination. It has been publishing The Unicorn newsletter since 1977. Littlest Unicorn is published eight times a year for children and their parents. The church began around the work and teaching of Rev. Paul Beyerl in the mid-1970s.

== See also ==
- Neopagan witchcraft
- Wiccan organisation
