= Jessica Orsini =

American politician

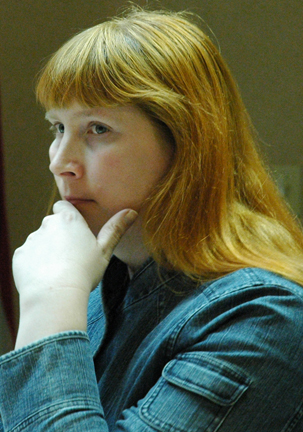

Ward III Alderwoman of Centralia, Missouri
- In office April 2006 – April 2012
- Preceded by: Don Bagley
- Succeeded by: Landon Magley
- Incumbent
- Assumed office September 2024
- Preceded by: Lonnie Cox

Personal details
- Born: December 23, 1967 (age 58) Franklinville, New York

Jessica Orsini (born December 23, 1967) is an American politician. She has served as an alderwoman for Centralia, Missouri since September 2024, having previously held that office from 2006 to 2012. She was the first openly transgender person elected to office in Missouri, and one of the first in the United States.

== Early life and military service ==
Orsini was born in Franklinville, New York, and suffered from gender dysphoria growing up. After graduating high school, she joined the military, where she was eventually stationed as a senior airman at Rhein-Main Air Base in Frankfurt, Germany. In 1991, she confided in a counselor about her dysphoria and desire to live as a woman; within hours she lost her security clearance and was shifted to a low-level job, and was eventually given an honorable discharge.

She transitioned and began using the name Jessica in 1996, while working at a software company in Columbia, Missouri.

== Political career and activism ==
=== Columbia anti-discrimination ordinance ===
After transitioning, Orsini faced discrimination in employment and housing, and by 2000 began to push for Columbia to include gender identity in its anti-discrimination ordinance. The measure came before the Columbia city council in 2002, but wasn't voted on due to opposition from local employers; after continued activism from Orsini and Missourian LGBTQ+ organizations like PROMO, the Columbia council unanimously voted in favor of including gender identity as a protected category in 2011.

=== Centralia Board of Aldermen ===
In 2004, Orsini ran to fill an open seat on the Centralia board of aldermen after an earlier election in which there weren't enough declared candidates. "We've got 3,500 people and we can't scrape together six people to step forward as aldermen? Something is wrong," she said. Although she ran unopposed, she ultimately lost to write-in candidate Robb Rosenfelder after what she described as a whisper campaign meant to make people uncomfortable with electing a transgender politician.

She was appointed by Centralia's mayor to the town's planning and zoning board, where she served for two years before being successfully elected to the board of aldermen in 2006. She was reelected in 2008 and 2010, and left office in 2012. While on the board of aldermen, she instituted housing inspections for rental properties and a new building code for Centralia. In 2009, she introduced a non-discrimination ordinance for Centralia, but the measure failed by a 2–4 vote.

In 2016, she ran again for the board of aldermen, but was defeated by Landon Magley.

In September 2024, she was appointed to the board to fill Ward III's vacant seat, and was reelected to a full two-year term in 2025. She has supported new regulations in Centralia that would require city approval before any data centers could be built in the town.

== Personal life ==
Orsini has described herself as a Hellenistic polytheist.

Orsini married Dawn Prough in 2002, but they faced difficulties over having their marriage legally recognized due to prohibitions on same-sex marriage and uncertainties over marriage rights of transgender people; Orsini was told by her city clerk that she couldn't obtain a marriage license regardless of who she married. After the Kansas Supreme Court decision of In re Estate of Gardiner, in which the court held a marriage between a man and a trans woman invalid because the latter was considered male under Kansas law, Orsini and Prough were able to be legally married in Kansas, but were still unsure if Missouri would honor their marriage.
