= Ross Nichols =

English academic, poet, artist, historian (1902-1975)

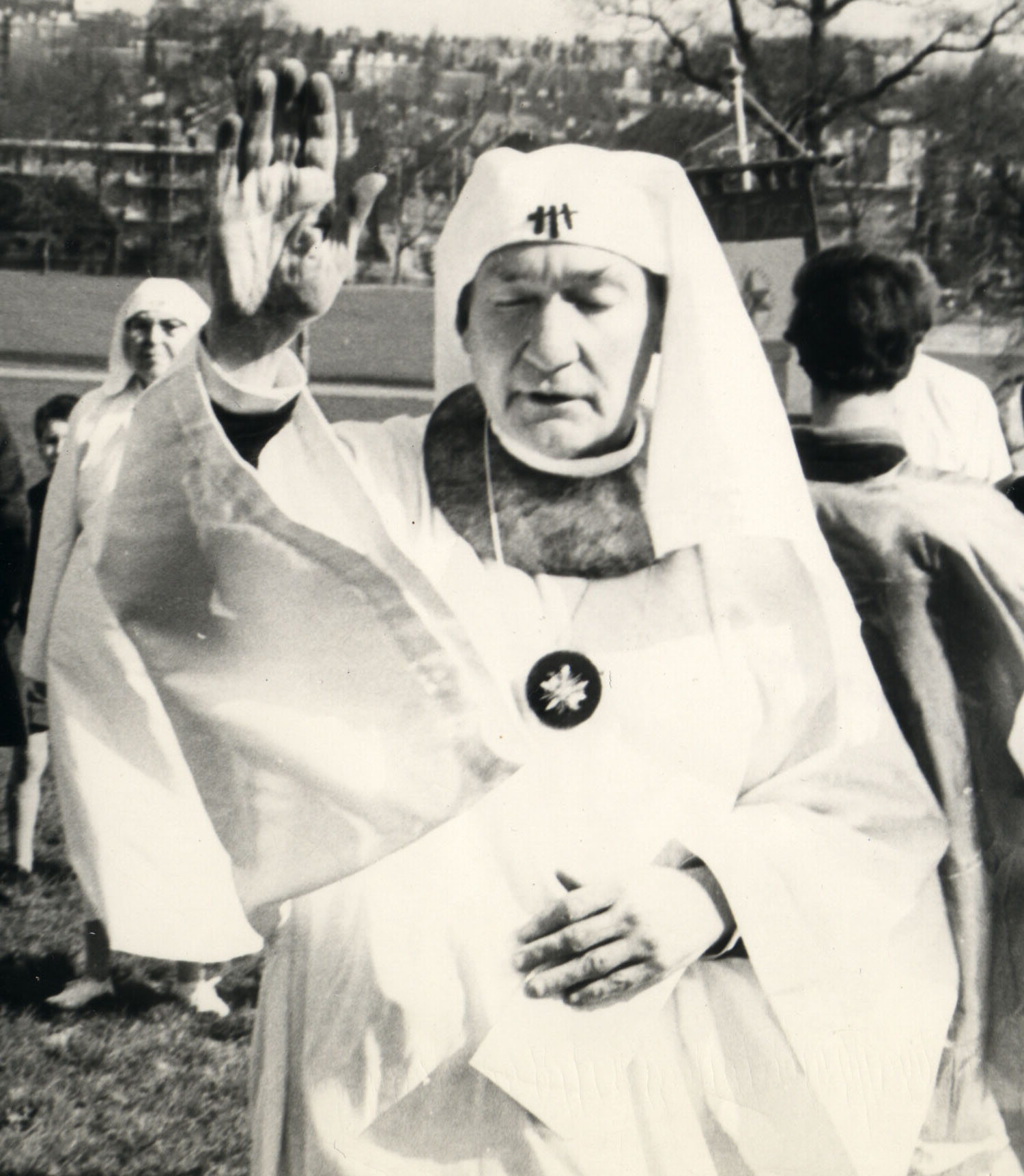
- Nichols, gives Peace to the Quarters at the Spring Equinox ceremony of the Order of Bards, Ovates and Druids on London's Parliament Hill 1967

Chosen Chief of the Order of Bards, Ovates and Druids
- In office 1964–death
- Succeeded by: Philip Carr-Gomm

Personal details
- Born: 28 June 1902 Norwich, England
- Died: 30 April 1975 (aged 72) London, England
- Occupation: Poet, Author, Historian, Artist

Philip Peter Ross Nichols (28 June 1902 – 30 April 1975) was a Cambridge academic and published poet, artist and historian, who founded the Order of Bards, Ovates and Druids in 1964. He wrote prolifically on the subjects of Druidism and Celtic mythology. He was also known by his druid name, Nuinn.

== Work ==
He revived the interest in Celtic neopaganism and Druidry in the 20th century. Nichols was a Member and Chairman of the Druid Order which traces its lineage to a meeting at the Apple Tree Tavern in Covent Garden, London, in 1717, although Professor Ronald Hutton has demonstrated that it only dates back to 1906, the 1717 story being a modification of the founding of modern Freemasonry. His main work, The Book of Druidry, was published posthumously in 1990.

== Life ==
Philip Peter Ross Nichols was born in Norwich, England, and educated at Bloxham School. While a graduate history student at Cambridge University, Nichols became influenced by the work of James George Frazer, Sigmund Freud, Carl Jung, T. S. Eliot, Robert Graves and Jessie Weston among others. He worked in journalism, teaching and social work through the Great Depression, and became a committed socialist and pacifist, favoring for the rest of his life the new economic theories of C. H. Douglas, whose concept of Social Credit advocated a total reform of the monetary system to make it more equitable. Ross was also a vegetarian and naturist, joining Britain's first naturist community, Spielplatz, near St. Albans in Hertfordshire, in the 1930s.

In 1939, Nichols became principal of a private college in London, while staying at Spielplatz during time off. It is assumed that on one of these trips he met and befriended Gerald Gardner.

Between 1941 and 1947, four of his poetry books were published, including an essay in The Cosmic Shape (1946) focusing on the power of myth and the value of seasonal celebration. Two were published by Fortune Press - 'Prose Chants and Proems' (1942) and 'Sassenach Stray (1942).

Ross was hired as assistant editor of The Occult Observer in 1949, by Michael Houghton of the Atlantis Bookshop. The short-lived publication marked the first time Nichols wrote about Druidism, and introduced the short story "Book of Shadows" (by Mir Bashir) that inspired Gardner to adopt the term for Wicca.

Nichols was asked to edit Gardner's seminal work, Witchcraft Today (1954). While Gardner worked to introduce Wicca to the modern world, Nichols worked to change the practice of modern Druidry. He introduced a concern for Celtic mythology and Bardcraft, and the celebration of the full eight seasonal ceremonies in addition to arranging the teachings into three grades, in accordance with classical accounts of the three divisions of the Druids.

Nichols also edited and published the 1969 translation of The History and Practice of Magic by Jean-Baptiste Pitois (a.k.a. Paul Christian).

His student Philip Carr-Gomm was asked to lead the Order in 1988.

== Published works ==
- Sassenach Stray A Set of Eight Variations and Tailpiece published by The Fortune Press 1941
- Prose Chants & Proems published by The Fortune Press 1941
- The Cosmic Shape (with James Kirkup) published by The Forge Press 1946
- Seasons at War – A Cycle of Rhythms published by The Forge Press 1947
- The Occult Observer – A Quarterly Journal of Occultism, Art & Philosophy (Contributor and Assistant Editor) published by Michael Houghton 1949, 1950
- The History & Practice of Magic by Paul Christian (Editor) published in 2 vols by The Forge Press 1952
- Witchcraft Today by Gerald Gardner (Editor) published by Rider & Co 1954
- The Book of Druidry published by the Aquarian Press (now Thorsons) 1990
- Prophet Priest & King – The Poetry of Philip Ross Nichols edited and introduced by Jay Ramsay published by The Oak Tree Press 2001
- In The Grove of the Druids – The Druid Teachings of Ross Nichols Introduced and edited by Philip Carr-Gomm, Foreword by Professor Ronald Hutton. Watkins 2002
- The Secret Lore of London: The city's Forgotten Stories and Mythology Coronet "Parliament Hill and the Druids" article 24 March 2016 ISBN 978-1473620247

== Biography ==
- Carr Gomm, Philip Journeys of the Soul: The Life and Legacy of a Druid Chief ISBN 978-1903232026

== See also ==
- Bricket Wood
- Neo-druidism
