= John and Caitlin Matthews =

English writers

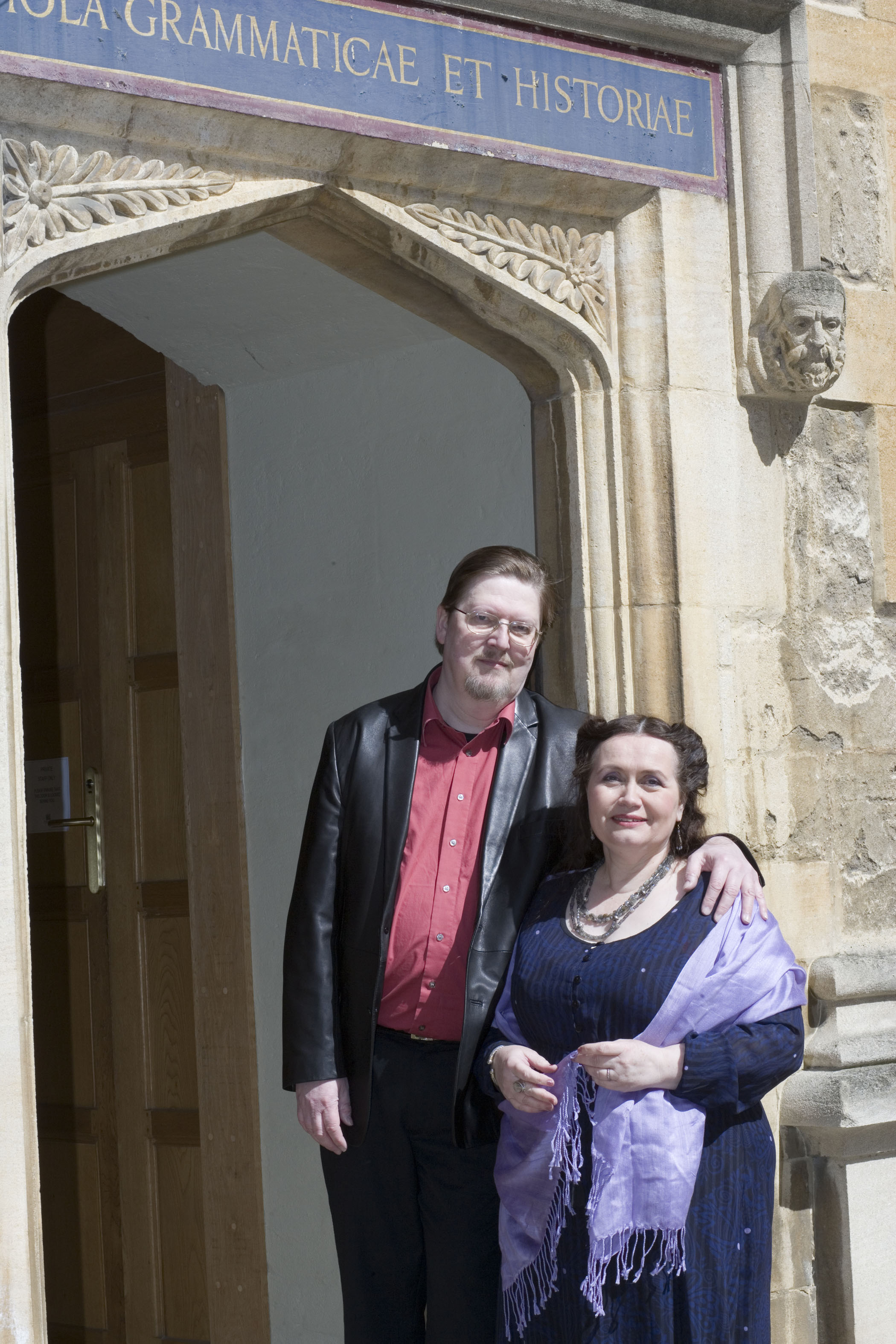
John and Caitlin Matthews

John Matthews (born 1948) and Caitlín Matthews (born 1952) are English writers. Together, they have written over 150 books and translated into more than thirty languages. Their work also includes Tarot decks, a card-based storytelling system, screenplays, and songs.

The Matthews began working in the 1970s while in London. They wrote and published The Western Way in 1985. This followed the lead of Christine Hartley's The Western Mysteries Tradition (1968) by identifying and promoting a European mystical tradition to offset the then-current domination of Eastern mysticisms from India and China. The book included meditations to enable readers to make contact with their inner worlds. They also edited The Encyclopedia of Celtic Wisdom (2000), devised the Storyworld series (2009) and, most recently, created The Steampunk Tarot: Gods of the Machine (2012). Pagan historian Ronald Hutton is critical of Caitlan Matthews works.

The Matthews studied with two of the leading esotericists of the time, Gareth Knight and Dolorous Ashcroft-Nowicki. From 1988 to 1992, they served as joint-presiders of the Order of Bards, Ovates and Druids. Since 1989, they have run the Fellowship of Isis Lyceum, Domus Sophiae Terrae et Sancte Gradalis in Oxford. The Matthews are also both members of the Archpriesthood Union as custodians of the legacy of the Fellowship of Isis.

John and Caitlín Matthews are active teachers on the New Age workshop circuit. They teach their versions of the Celtic mysteries, Neo-shamanism, the Goddess and King Arthur. In 2011, The Matthews were jointly listed 86th in the Watkins list of the 100 most spiritually influential living people worldwide. They currently live in Oxford, UK.

== John Matthews ==
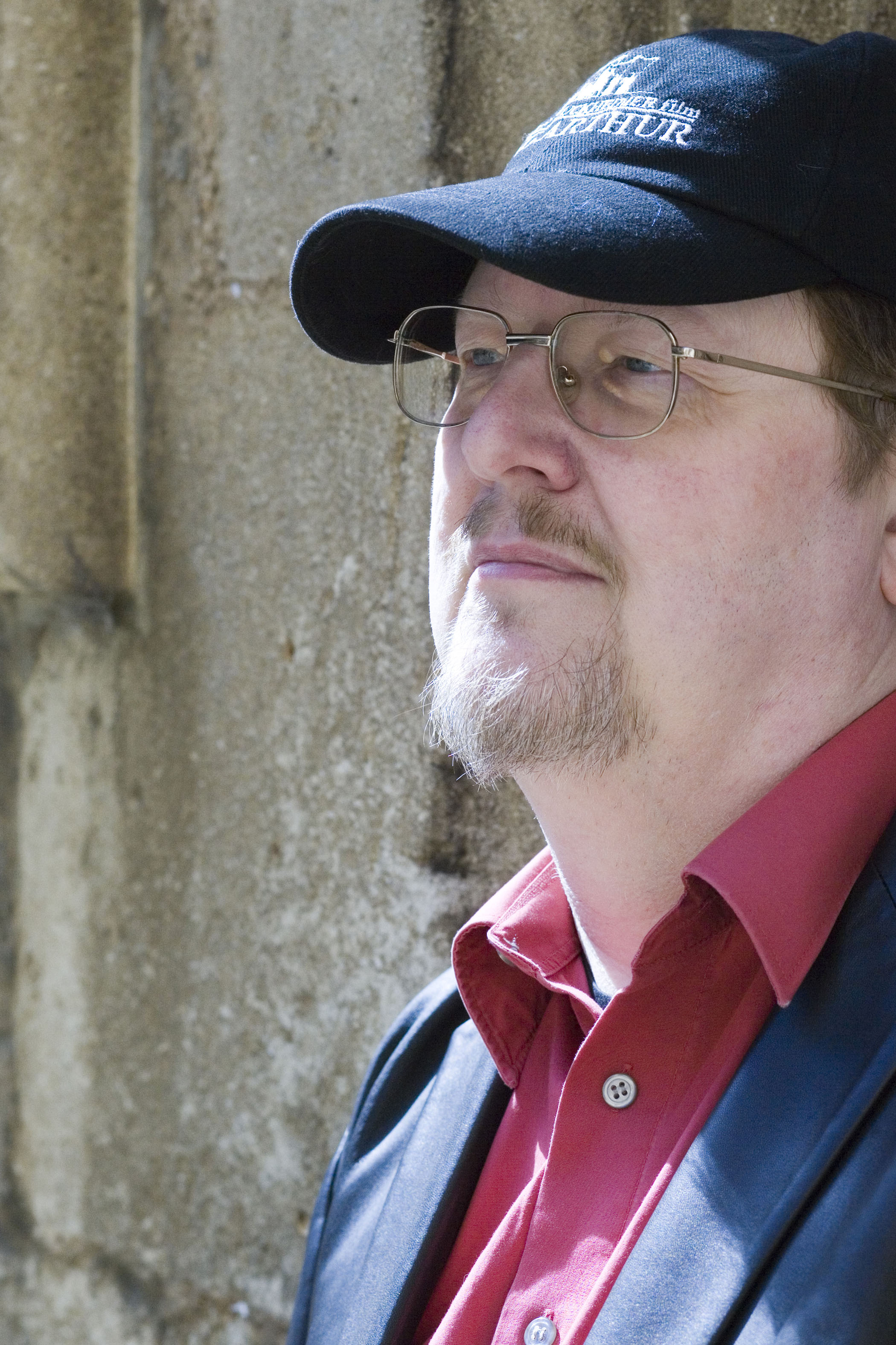
John Matthews

John Matthews (born 1948) has been involved in study of the mysteries of Britain including the Arthurian Legends and the Grail Myth, for almost fifty years. He has published over ninety books on myth, the Arthurian Legends and Grail studies, including The Grail: Quest for the Eternal (1981), and most recently The Camelot Oracle (2012, with Will Worthington). He has also published short stories, a volume of poetry, and several children's books, most notably Pirates (2006) which was on the New York Times best-seller list for twenty-two weeks. His book Arthur of Albion (2009) won a gold Moonbeams award.

He has taught throughout Europe and the United States and has acted as advisor for a number of media projects including the Jerry Bruckheimer film King Arthur (2004). He has appeared on the History Channel and Discovery Channel programs on Arthur and the Holy Grail, and shared a BAFTA Award for his work on the educational DVD made to accompany "King Arthur". He has acted as a guest editor and member of the editorial board for the international journal Arthuriana.

== Caitlín Matthews ==
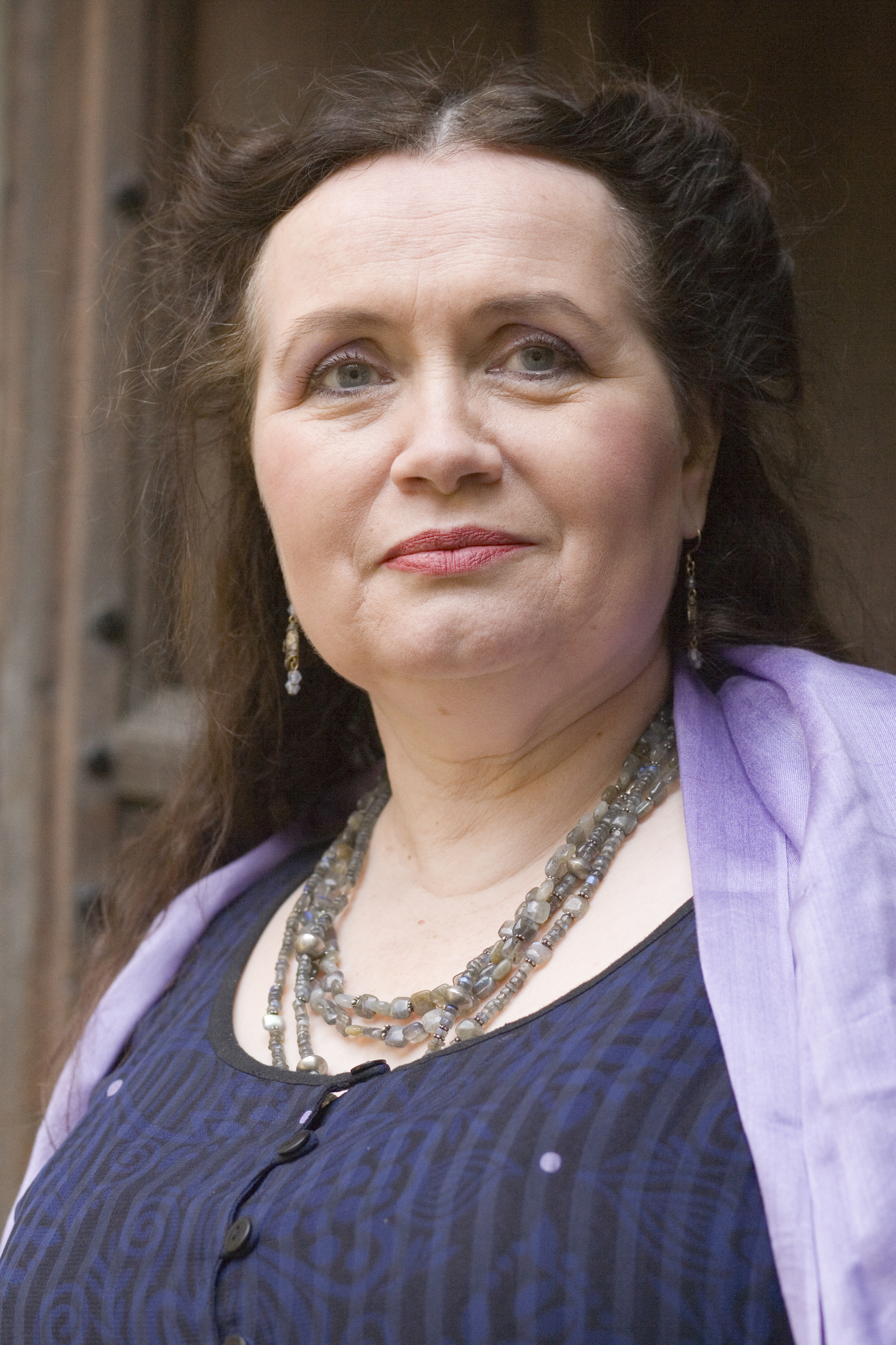
Caitlín Matthews

Caitlín Matthews (born 1952) was born in Portsmouth, England, of British and Irish parents, and from an early age was aware of a spiritual dimension to life. She was initiated into the Fellowship of Isis in 1977 and was subsequently ordained as priestess in 1988. She continues as arch-priestess in the Arch Priesthood Union, as one of the custodians of the Fellowship of Isis.

Following the publication of The Western Way she has written over sixty books including several works on the divine feminine, and the worlds of early Welsh and Irish literature. Her work reflects both the older academic sources and the newer Celtic mystical ones, but leaves out, according to Ronald Hutton, "the scholarly publications of the 1980s, many of which have radically altered existing views of the sources for our knowledge of the ancient Celts."

Matthews has led workshops in Britain and elsewhere, including the Temenos Academy, London; Regent's Park College, Oxford; the University of Jyväskylä in Finland, the University of Lisbon in Portugal, and at Studium Generale of the Arnhem Institute for the Arts in Netherlands.

=== Criticism ===
Hutton, commenting on Caitlín Matthews' works, states that she "falls below the standards required of a professional historian. She makes no attempt to distinguish between the relative value of sources, so those from the seventh century and from the seventeenth are put together with no sense of context." He also states that she conditions her work to the needs of her audience and that she has incorrectly suggested parallels between Celtic lore and Native American religion.

== Bibliography ==
=== Caitlín & John Matthews ===
- The Western Way: A Practical Guide to the Western Mystery Tradition. Volume I: The Native Tradition, Arkana, 1985 Volume 2: The Hermetic Tradition, Arkana, 1986. A revised and updated edition was published in one volume under the title Walkers Between the Worlds (Inner Traditions, 2002)
- The Arthurian Tarot: A Hallowquest, Aquarian Press, 1990
- The Encyclopedia of Celtic Wisdom: A Celtic Shaman's Sourcebook, Element, 2000
- King Arthur's Raid on the Underworld: The Oldest Grail Quest, Gothic Image, 2008 (paintings by Meg Falconer)
- The Element Encyclopedia of Magical Creatures, Harper Element, 2009
- StoryWorld, Templar, 2009
- The Steampunk Tarot: Gods of the Machine, Connections, 2012

=== John Matthews ===
- The Grail: Quest for the Eternal, Thames & Hudson, 1981
- The Celtic Shaman, Element Books Limited, Shaftesbury, Dorset, 1991 (Great Britain)
- Taliesin: Shamanism and the Bardic Mysteries in Britain and Ireland, Aquarian Press, 1991 (Reprinted as Taliesin: The Last Celtic Shaman (Inner Traditions, 2000))
- King Arthur: From Dark Age Warrior to Mythic Hero, Carlton, 2004
- The Grail Seeker's Companion, Thoth, 2004 (with Marian Green)
- The Wildwood Tarot, Connections, 2011 (with Mark Ryan)
- The Lost Tarot of Nostradamus, Connections, 2012 (with Wil Kinghan)
- The Camelot Oracle, Connections, 2012 (with Will Worthington)
- The Mystery of Spring-Heeled Jack: From Victorian Legend to Steampunk Hero, Destiny Books, 2016

=== Caitlín Matthews ===
- Mabon and the Mysteries of Britain: An Exploration of the Mabinogion, Arkana, 1987
- The Elements of the Goddess, Element, 1989
- The Elements of Celtic Tradition, Element, 1989
- Arthur and the Sovereignty of Britain: King and Goddess in the Mabinogion, Arkana, 1990
- Sophia Goddess of Wisdom: the divine feminine from black goddess to world-soul, HarperCollins, 1991
- Celtic Spirit, HarperSanFrancisco, 1998
- Celtic Love, HarperSanFrancisco, 1999
- Celtic Book of the Dead, Connections, 1999
- Celtic Wisdom Sticks: An Ogham Oracle, Connections, 2001
- Sophia: Goddess of Wisdom, Bride of God, Quest, 2001
- Singing the Soul Back Home: Shamanic Wisdom for Every Day, Connections, 2002
- Mabon and the Guardians of Celtic Britain: Hero Myths in the Mabinogion, Inner Traditions, 2002
- King Arthur and the Goddess of the Land, Inner Traditions, 2002
- The Psychic Protection Handbook: Powerful Protection for Uncertain Times, Piatkus, 2005
- Celtic Visions: Seership, Omens and Dreams of the Otherworld, Watkins, 2012
