= LaSara FireFox =

American writer

LaSara FireFox (now LaSara Firefox Allen) is an American writer, game designer, sex educator, and a neuro-linguistic programming master practitioner and trainer. She is a family-traditions witch and a second-generation ordained priestess. She is the founder and CEO of the Ecstatic Presence Project and Global Family Awakening: an educational, peace and humanitarian family adventure club.

== Greenfield Ranch ==
Firefox was raised at Greenfield Ranch in Ukiah, California, a 5,600-acre (23 km^{2}) property that was sub-divided into several parcels, some with intentional communities such as Coeden Brith, where Oberon Zell-Ravenheart and Morning Glory Zell-Ravenheart founded the Holy Order of Mother Earth (a precursor to the Church of All Worlds), adjacent to Anwan (run by Gwydion Pendderwen). She is a former president of the Greenfield Ranch Association.

== Written works ==
Firefox has written and taught in the fields of spirituality, human sexuality, parenting and bipolar disorder. In addition to Sexy Witch, her writing has been published in numerous anthologies, textbooks, magazines, an encyclopedia, and extensively in online journals. She was also included in the Hot Mommas project on women in leadership. Her essay on bipolar disorder and the entrepreneurial life was second runner up in their national case study competition and was included in the entrepreneurship textbook Essentials of Small Business Management (6th Edition). She published The Pussy Poems in response to the censure of Michigan State Rep. Lisa Brown for saying the word vagina in a debate on the legislation of abortion rights.

Lasara's ideas about female empowerment are evident in her book Sexy Witch. Sexy Witch is in its third printing in the US, and second printing in both Mexico and the Czech Republic. It has been published in four languages.

== Neuro-linguistic programming ==
Firefox is a certified master practitioner and trainer of neuro-linguistic programming. She received her master practitioner and NLP trainers' certification from Richard Bandler's Pure NLP/Society of NLP and trained with the California Institute of Neuro-Linguistic Programming, The Hawkridge Institute, and the Society of Neuro-Linguistic Programming.

== Spirituality ==
FireFox is a second-generation witch, and an ordained priestess. She was a clergy member and former president of the board of the Church of All Worlds (1999 and 2000). She has presented workshops for several spiritual events and organizations including the Church of All Worlds, the Tree of Life, PanTheaCon, and both the Starwood Festival and the WinterStar Symposium. She was interviewed in the book Modern Pagans: an Investigation of Contemporary Ritual by John Sulak and V. Vale, and contributed to Taylor Ellwood's anthology Magick on the Edge: Adventures in Experimental Magick. Bewitching Names references Lasara in a discussion on the names of Neo-Pagan witches and their children.

== Sex educator ==
FireFox is a graduate of the San Francisco Sex Information human sexuality intensive, and wrote about sexuality and spirituality for over a decade. She appeared on Playboy TV's Sexcetera and Canada's SexTV. She designed and presented safer sex workshops for various groups between 1994 and 2006 and appeared on the Street Wise TV show. She is a contributor to the books The Encyclopedia of Prostitution and Sex Work by Melissa Hope Ditmore and Human Sexuality by Roger R. Hock.

== Game designer ==
Firefox, the designer of Gratitude Games, an eco-friendly family game that helps families and individuals make the practice of gratitude accessible and engaging.

== Bibliography ==
=== Books ===
- Sexy Witch. Llewellyn Worldwide. 2005. ISBN 0-7387-0752-X.
- Lasara, Allen (2012). The Pussy Poems. Treasure Finder Press. ISBN 978-1-4675-4147-3. Archived from the original on 2012-12-29.

=== Articles in longer works ===
- Greenfield Ranch 25th Anniversary: 1972–1997. GRAET. 1997.
- The New Settler Interviews, Volume I: Boogie at the Brink. Chelsea Green Publishing Company. 2000.
- Gore, Ariel; Lavender, Bee, eds. (2001). Breeder: Real-Life Stories from the New Generation of Mothers. Seal Press. ISBN 1-58005-051-4.
- Elwood, Taylor, ed. (2006). Magick on the Edge: Adventures in Experimental Magick. Immanion Press/Megalithica Books. ISBN 1-905713-05-3.
- Zell-Ravenheart, Morning Glory (2006). Oberon Zell-Ravenheart (ed.). Circles and Ceremonies: Rituals for All Seasons And Reasons. New Page Books. ISBN 978-1-56414-864-3.
- Ditmore, Melissa Hope (2006). The Encyclopedia of Prostitution and Sex Work. Greenwood Press. ISBN 978-0-313-32968-5.
- Hock, Roger R. (2006). Human Sexuality. Prentice Hall. ISBN 978-0-13-198699-2.
- Scarborough., Norman (3 January 2010). Essentials of Small Business Management (6th ed.). Pearson Prentice Hall. ISBN 978-0-13-610959-4.
