= Paul Beyerl =

American Wiccan priest

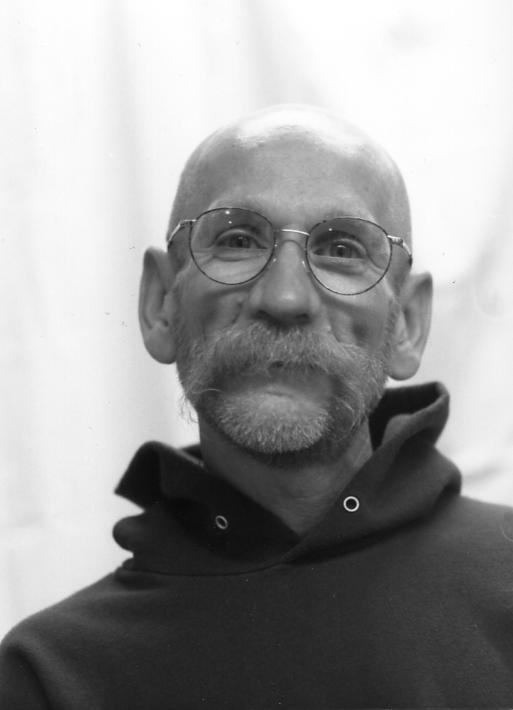
- Born: 1945 (age 80–81); Owen, Wisconsin, U.S.
- Church: The Rowan Tree Church
- Title: Reverend

Rev. Paul Beyerl, (pronounced "bye'-rul") was an American author and educator, and particularly as a Wiccan priest, in Wiccan and neopagan circles.

== Biography ==
Rev. Paul and Rev. Gerry Beyerl, his partner since 1993, resided on an 11-acre property in southeast Minnesota just west of Houston, Minnesota. The property is known as The Hermit's Grove and is a retreat and educational center for The Rowan Tree Church and The Hermit's Grove. It houses the administrative offices, guest lodging for Church Members and students, a 4500-book research library, and the herbal area holding more than 200 species of dried botanicals.

The Rowan Tree Church is Wiccan, representing The Tradition of Lothloriën. Beyerl founded both in the 1970s when living in Minneapolis. The Rowan Tree Church trains its clergy in The Mystery School, a challenging and in-depth educational program. Both the Church and Mystery School serve Church Members and students living both near the center and at great distances. The Tradition is discussed at length in Beyerl's book A Wiccan Bardo, Revisited.

The Hermit's Grove, incorporated in 1994 as a separate nonprofit organization supportive of the Church, was merged into The Rowan Tree Church in 2011. The Hermit's Grove includes the publishing house for the Church, and the Master Herbalist Program, an extensive study in botanical medicine. Beyerl was known as a Master Herbalist and had taught programs in herbal medicine since the 1970s. In addition to numerous appearances throughout the U.S., Beyerl taught in Canada and Portugal.

Beyerl died at his home in Houston, Minnesota on December 30, 2021.

== Publications ==
Beyerl began publishing a Wiccan newsletter - The Unicorn - in 1977. It is now among the longest-published Wiccan newsletters in North America, in continuous publication since 1977.

== Bibliography ==
• The Master Book of Herbalism (1984) Phoenix Publishing (ISBN 0-919345-53-0)

• A Wiccan Bardo: Initiation and Self-Transformation originally published by Prism Press in England and the U.S. (ISBN 1-85327-036-9) and by Unity Press in Australia in 1989.

• A Wiccan Reader Vol 1 (1994) ISBN 978-0-9655687-7-7

• A Wiccan Reader Vol 2 (2010) ISBN 978-0-9655687-8-4

• Painless Astrology (1997) Hermit's Grove (ISBN 0-9655687-0-9)

• The Holy Books of the Devas (1998) The Hermit's Grove (ISBN 0-9655687-1-7)

• A Compendium of Herbal Magick (1998) Phoenix Publishing (ISBN 0-919345-45-X)

• A Wiccan Bardo, Revisited (1999) The Hermit's Grove (ISBN 0-9655687-2-5)

• The Symbols and Magick of Tarot (2005) The Hermit's Grove (ISBN 0-9655687-4-1)

• Gem and Mineral Lore (2005) The Hermit's Grove (ISBN 0-9655687-3-3)

• On Death & Dying (2014) The Hermit's Grove (ISBN 978-0-9863639-0-0)

== Discography ==
- The Arts of Healing - Lecture on cassette (ACE)
- Initiation and Initiatory Orders (Panel Discussion with Ian Corrigan, Liafal, and Donald Michael Kraig) (ACE)
