= Zdzisław Harlender =

Polish pilot, army officer and writer

- Born: 15 June 1898; Kraków, Poland
- Died: 11 September 1939 (aged 41)
- Occupations: pilot, army officer and writer

Zdzisław Harlender (15 June 1898 – 11 September 1939) was a Polish pilot, army officer and writer.

== Biography ==
After serving in World War I, where Harlender was wounded in the Battle of Lemberg, he volunteered for the Polish Airforce and was trained as a pilot. In 1921 he was demobilized and after studies at the Academy of Foreign Trade in Lwów and Warsaw School of Economics he worked as a teacher and journalist. In 1932 he was enrolled in a military officer school and in 1934 was appointed as an infantry lieutenant.

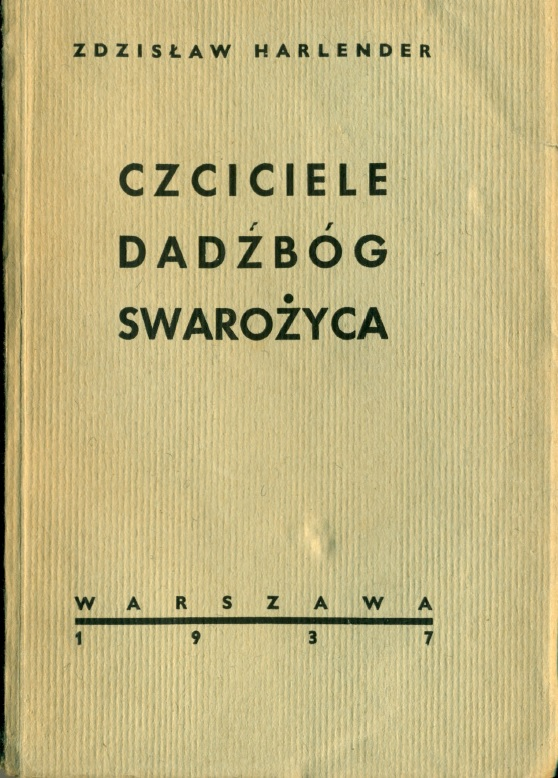
Czciciele Dadźbóg Swarożyca, 1937

Harlender published five books from 1933 to 1939: two on economics, one a war memoir, and the last on politics. In Czciciele Dadźbóg Swarożyca (lit. 'Worshipers of Dadźbóg Swarożyc') from 1937, he lays out his vision for the revival of the pre-Christian Slavic religion. Although a nationalist and a neopagan, he stood outside of the Polish neopagan milieus of his time.

He was mobilized in the Polish Army when World War II broke out and died on 11 September 1939.

== Bibliography ==
- Manipulowana waluta wewnętrzna i pieniądz do wypłat międzynarodowych, Warsaw 1933
- Na podniebnych szlakach. (Zakochani w maszynach), Warsaw 1935
- Waluta o ustalonej sile nabywczej, Warsaw 1935
- Czciciele Dadźbóg Swarożyca, Warsaw 1937
- Polski dynamizm polityczny: praca dyskusyjna, Warsaw 1939

== See also ==
- Slavic Native Faith in Poland
