= Zorian Dołęga-Chodakowski =

Polish ethnographer and archaeologist (1784–1825)

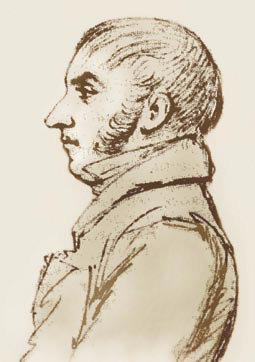
- Chodakowski in 1818
- Born: Adam Czarnocki; 4 June 1784; Podhajnej, Grand Duchy of Lithuania
- Died: 17 November 1825 (aged 41); Tver Governorate, Russian Empire
- Occupations: ethnographer and archaeologist

Academic background
- Influences: Stanisław Staszic

Academic work
- Discipline: Ethnography, Archeology
- Sub-discipline: Slavic studies
- Notable works: O Sławiańszczyźnie przed chrześcijaństwem (1818)
- Influenced: Joachim Lelewel

Zorian Dołęga-Chodakowski (4 June 1784 – 17 November 1825), born Adam Czarnocki, was a Polish ethnographer and archaeologist. A Slavophile, he became known for his ethnographic field research and theories about the ancient Slavs, which did not convince academics but have influenced Polish cultural life. For much of his adult life he travelled the countryside without any money, collecting folk songs and other material.

Chodakowski established several themes that became prominent in Polish Romanticism, notably a duality between native Slavic culture and imported Latin culture. His lifestyle as a homeless traveller inspired legends and he appears as a character in literary works from the 19th century. Chodakowski argued publicly that Christianisation of the Slavs had been a mistake and privately described himself as a pagan. He is recognised as a pioneer of Polish Native Faith.

== Life and work ==
Adam Czarnocki was born on 4 June 1784 in Podhajnej near Nyasvizh, then part of the Grand Duchy of Lithuania. He belonged to an impoverished Polish noble family and was forced into military service, but defected from the Russian army to the Army of the Duchy of Warsaw and took part in the War of 1812 on Napoleon's side. He changed his name to Zorian Dołęga-Chodakowski after Napoleon's defeat.

Chodakowski was a Slavophile and took a name that resonated with his interest in Slavic history and culture. His interest in ethnography followed the models established by the early 19th-century Society of Friends of Learning, which had studied folklore and became the centre of the Slavic movement in Poland. Its main ideologue Stanisław Staszic hypothesised in the 1815 book Myśli o równowadze politycznej w Europie (lit. 'Thoughts on Political Equilibrium in Europe') that the ancient Greek, Roman, Germanic and Slavic cultures had been superior to the Christian nations that succeeded them.

In 1813 or 1814, Chodakowski began to travel to collect folk songs and other folklore material from rural areas in hope of finding traces of ancient Slavic culture. A scholarship from Adam Jerzy Czartoryski allowed him to do ethnographic studies in Lesser Poland from September 1817 to June 1818. He lacked strict methodology for these studies, but went on to devote most of his adult life to ethnographic field research and archaeological studies, visiting Sandomierz, Częstochowa, Chęciny, Lelów, Pilica, Skała, Kraków, Przemyśl, Lwów, Potylicz, Żółkiew and Gródek Jagielloński. He was often homeless and without any money during his travels. He collected a large number of folk songs which remained unpublished during his lifetime.

In 1818, Chodakowski published the pamphlet O Sławiańszczyźnie przed chrześcijaństwem (lit. 'On the Slavic lands before Christianity') where he laid out his views of Slavic history and culture. His theories were not well received by academics but have influenced novelists, artists and neopagans. Chodakowski thought the Slavs originated in India and had immigrated to Europe in the sixth century. He used the Polish word inąd—'elsewhere'—as linguistic evidence for his Indian homeland hypothesis. He thought there always had been a unified Slavic language and culture that was characterised by a "spirit of independence" which he wished to see as the basis for a future national culture. He argued that this could be achieved through the conscious collection and study of folklore material. He argued publicly that Christianisation of the Slavic peoples had been a mistake, something no one in Central Europe had done since the 15th century. In private letters he designated himself as a pagan. He died in Tver Governorate on 17 November 1825.

== Legacy ==
Chodakowski's view of the early Slavs as proto-democratic influenced the historian and left-wing politician Joachim Lelewel, who agreed that ancient Slavic religion, which Lelewel interpreted as monotheistic, would be a good model for 19th-century progressivism. Chodakowski established several major themes that would occupy the Polish Romantics, notably a focus on Slavic identity and paganism, an anti-Latin sentiment and an identification with the geographical north. His view of a duality between native Slavic and imported Latin elements in Polish culture has had a lasting impact on Polish literature.

The homeless lifestyle Chodakowski adopted during his travels made people view him as a "wild man". He became surrounded by legends and appears as a character in 19th-century Polish literature. Works that feature fictionalised versions of Chodakowski include Mistrz (1838; lit. 'The Master') by Dominik Magnuszewski, "Przygoda podróżnika" (1852; lit. 'The Adventure of a Traveller') by Lucjan Siemieński and Król-Duch (1845–1849; lit. 'The Spirit King') by Juliusz Słowacki.

Chodakowski is considered one of the founders of Polish Native Faith. The historian Peter Brock argued that Chodakowski was the spiritual father of Polish populist nationalism. This is contested by Mieczysław B. Biskupski, who argues that Polish nationalism as it exists originated in the political landscape created by the failed January Uprising of 1863–1864. It thus belongs to a separate era from Chodakowski's works, in which a culturally Polish nationalism only appears within the context of a broader Slavophilia.

The literary historian Julian Maślanka published a monograph about Chodakowski in 1965. In 1973, a collection of Chodakowski's folk songs was published as Śpiewy sławiańskie pod strzechą wiejską zebrane (lit. 'Slavic songs recorded in thatched-roof homes'). The book has an introduction and commentary by Maślanka.
