= Stanisław Potrzebowski =

Polish neopagan

Staszko z Wrocławia
- Stanisław Potrzebowski
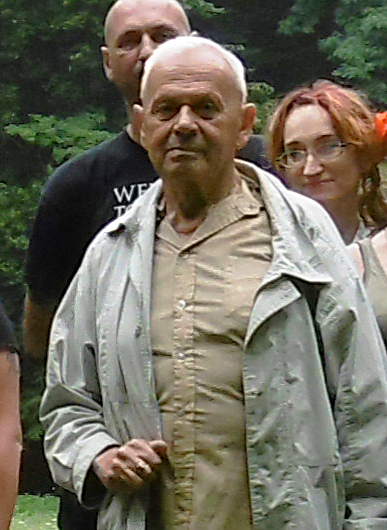
- Title: Naczelnik

Personal life
- Born: 9 February 1937 (age 89) Brest-on-the-Bug, Polesie Voivodeship, Second Polish Republic
- Home town: Wrocław
- Education: University of Mainz

Religious life
- Religion: Rodnovery
- Church: Rodzima Wiara

Stanisław Potrzebowski (born 9 February 1937) is the founder and Naczelnik (transl. leader) of Rodzima Wiara, a Polish rodnover organisation, and of the European Congress of Ethnic Religions.

== Career ==
Between 1954 and 1957 Potrzebowski studied geology at the AGH University of Science and Technology. In 1957, he was arrested and interrogated by the Security Service for distributing leaflets against the closure of the student magazine Po Prostu. From 1958 to 1966 he served in the Polish air force; he left the army with the rank of porucznik. In 1972, he finished his studies with honors and received a master's degree of history at the University of Wrocław.

In 1973, Potrzebowski went to West Germany and started studies at the University of Mainz. In 1980 he received the title of PhD in philosophy. In 1985 he went to South Africa, where he worked e.g. at Deutsche Schule in Pretoria. In 1991 he returned to Poland and settled in Wrocław. Potrzebowski continues his research in this field and also gives public lectures.

== Publications ==
- Potrzebowski, Stanisław (1982). Zadruga: eine völkische Bewegung in Polen [Zadruga: nationalist movement in Poland] (in German). Bonn: Institut für Angewandte Sozialgeschichte. ISBN 3923428006.
- Potrzebowski, Stanisław (2016). Słowiański ruch Zadruga [Slavic movement Zadruga] (in Polish). Wrocław: Wydawnictwo Triglav. ISBN 9788362586967.
