= Rodzima Wiara =

Polish Rodnover religious organization

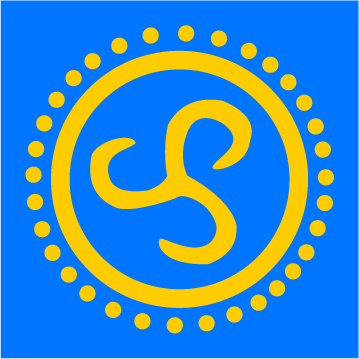
- Formation: March 23, 1996; 30 years ago
- Founder: Stanisław Potrzebowski
- Founded at: Wrocław
- Type: Rodnovery
- Location: Poland
- Members: ECER, Rodnover Confederation
- naczelnik: Stanisław Potrzebowski
- Website: rodzimawiara.org.pl

Rodzima Wiara (meaning "Native Faith") is a Polish Rodnover religious organization, founded in 1996 by Stanisław Potrzebowski in Wrocław as Zrzeszenie Rodzimej Wiary (meaning "Union of Native Faith"). The name was changed to the current one in 2000.

Zrzeszenie Rodzimej Wiary was registered with the Polish Ministry of the Interior's registry of denominations and churches on March 4, 1996. The official activity of organization was started on March 23, 1996 during the Veche of the Followers in Wrocław.

Rodzima Wiara is a member of the European Congress of Ethnic Religions and of the Rodnover Confederation.
