= Celtic neopaganism =

Modern paganism based on ancient alleged Celtic traditions

The triskele is one of the main symbols of Celtic Reconstructionism.

Celtic neopaganism refers to any type of modern paganism or contemporary pagan movements based on the ancient Celtic religion. One approach is Celtic Reconstructionism (CR), which emphasizes historical accuracy in reviving Celtic traditions. CR practitioners rely on historical sources and archaeology for their rituals and beliefs, including offerings to spirits and deities. Language study and preservation are essential, and daily life often incorporates ritual elements. While distinct from eclectic pagan and neopagan witchcraft traditions, there is some overlap with Neo-druidism.

Additionally, Celtic neoshamanism combines Celtic elements with shamanic practices, while Celtic Wicca blends Celtic mythology with Wiccan traditions. Each tradition within Celtic neopaganism has its unique focus and practices but draws inspiration from the ancient Celtic heritage.

== Celtic reconstructionism ==
Celtic reconstructionism
- The triple spiral, symbolizing the Three Realms
- Abbreviation: CR
- Type: Ethnic religion
- Classification: Modern Paganism
- Orientation: Reconstructionist
- Scripture: Non-scripture-centric
- Theology: Celtic polytheism
- Associations: European Congress of Ethnic Religions
- Origin: Mid-1980s

Celtic reconstructionism (CR) or Celtic reconstructionist paganism is a polytheistic reconstructionist approach to ancient Celtic religion, emphasizing historical accuracy over eclecticism such as is found in most forms of Celtic neopaganism. It is an effort to reconstruct and revive, in a modern Celtic cultural context, pre-Christian Celtic religions. Various groups and approaches based on different Celtic religious traditions emerged in the late 20th century in the United States and in Britain; there are also Celtic reconstructionists in Eastern Europe.

The study of mythology and folklore was part of modern paganism from its inception, and while many groups focused on witchcraft, some sought to revive pre-Christian religions. During the 1980s, some of these reacted against the eclecticism and the focus on the "spirit" of the ancient religions in favor of "reconstructing what can be known from the extant historical record". Although some Celtic reconstructionist groups only developed an online presence after their formation, the development of BBSs and the Internet facilitated the growth of the movement; A CR FAQ was collectively developed, originally online.

As of 2016, Celtic reconstructionism is the third most common form of reconstructionist paganism in the United States, after Asatru (Germanic reconstructionism) and Kemetic reconstructionism. In addition to English-speaking paganism, there are Celtic reconstructionists in the Czech Republic and in Russia. In both the United States and Britain, Celtic reconstructionism became an umbrella term encompassing several sub-traditions, which vary in particular in the geographic region whose religion they aim to reconstruct, such as British, Irish, Scottish, or Welsh.

=== Practices ===
Like many other modern pagan traditions, Celtic reconstructionism has no sacred texts and so personal research is stressed. Many Celtic reconstructionists draw on archaeology, historical manuscripts, and comparative religion, primarily of Celtic cultures, but sometimes other European cultures as well. Celtic reconstructionists are not pan-Celtic in practice, but rather study the documentary and archaeological evidence for a particular Celtic tradition. While the ancient Celtic religions were largely subsumed by Christianity, many religious traditions have survived in the form of folklore, mythology, songs, and prayers. Many folkloric practices never completely died out, and some Celtic reconstructionists can draw on family traditions originating in customs from a particular Celtic region.

Rituals are based on reconstructions of traditional techniques of interacting with the Otherworld, such as the offering of food, drink, and art to the spirits of the land, ancestral spirits, and the Celtic deities. Celtic reconstructionists give offerings to the spirits throughout the year, but at Samhain, more elaborate offerings are made to specific deities and ancestors. While Celtic reconstructionists strive to revive the religious practices of historical Celtic peoples as accurately as possible, they acknowledge that some aspects of their religious practice are new inventions informed by theories about the past. Feedback from scholars and experienced practitioners is sought before a new practice is accepted as a valid part of a reconstructed tradition.

The ancient Irish swore their oaths by the "Three Realms" of land, sea, and sky; Celtic reconstructionists use the triple spiral, An Thríbhís Mhòr, to symbolize the three realms. Many also view acts of daily life as a form of ritual, performing daily rites of purification and protection accompanied with traditional prayers and songs from sources such as the Scottish Gaelic Carmina Gadelica or manuscript collections of ancient Irish or Welsh poetry. They also believe that mystical, ecstatic practices are a necessary balance to scholarship and a vital part of their religion. Some practice divination; ogham is a favoured method, as are traditional customs such as the taking of omens from the shapes of clouds or the behaviour of birds and animals.

Language study and preservation is regarded as a core part of the tradition. as are, to a lesser extent, participation in other cultural activities such as Celtic music and dance. Celtic pagans have been accused of cultural appropriation and ignoring living Celtic communities, particularly because of the neo-pagan concept of "elective affinity", whereby identification as Celtic is a personal choice; Celtic reconstructionists seek to be aware of this danger and to participate in living Celtic cultures. Some took part in the protests against the proposed destruction of archaeological sites around the Hill of Tara in the course of construction of the M3 motorway in Ireland, as well as performing a coordinated ritual of protection. Some have suggested that reconstructionism brings a danger of ethnocentrism.

=== Labels ===
Some groups that take a Celtic reconstructionist approach to ancient Gaelic polytheism call themselves "Gaelic Traditionalists", but this term is also often used by Celtic Christians. Some Gaelic-oriented groups have used the Scottish Gaelic Pàganachd ('Paganism, Heathenism') or the corresponding Irish Págánacht. One Gaelic Polytheist group on the East Coast of the US has used a modification of the Gaelic term, Pàganachd Bhandia ('Paganism of Goddesses'). The Irish word for 'polytheism', ildiachas, is in use by at least one group on the West Coast of the US as Ildiachas Atógtha ('Reconstructed Polytheism'). In 2000, IMBAS, A Celtic reconstructionist organisation based in Seattle, adopted the name Senistrognata, a constructed "Old Celtic" term intended as a translation of "ancestral customs" in the manner of forn sed as a parallel term used in Germanic neopaganism.

=== Relationship with other traditions ===
Celtic reconstructionism is distinguished from eclectic, universalist paganism and from neopagan witchcraft traditions. Reconstructionist groups also differ in focus from Celtic revivalists, for whom the spirit of Celtic religion is more important than historical accuracy. Within reconstructionism, there are varying degrees of emphasis on accuracy as opposed to what best reflects the essence of the religion in a modern context.

There has been cross-pollination between Neo-druid and Celtic reconstructionist groups, and there is significant crossover of membership between the two movements, but the two have largely differing goals and methodologies. However, some Neo-druid groups (notably Ár nDraíocht Féin (ADF), the Order of Bards, Ovates and Druids (OBOD), and the Henge of Keltria) have adopted similar methodologies of reconstruction at least some of the time. ADF, in particular, has long used reconstructionist techniques, but is pan-Indo-European in scope, which may result in non-Celtic combinations such as "Vedic druids" and "Roman druids". Terminological differences exist as well, especially in terms of what druid means. Some Neo-druid groups call anyone with an interest in Celtic spirituality a "druid", and refer to the practice of any Celtic-inspired spirituality as "druidry", while reconstructionist groups usually regard "druid" as a culturally-specific office requiring long training and experience, only attained by a small number of practitioners, and which must be conferred and confirmed by the community the druid serves.

== Celtic neoshamanism ==
Celtic neoshamanism is a modern spiritual tradition that combines elements from Celtic myth and legend with Michael Harner's core shamanism. Proponents of Celtic Shamanism believe that its practices allow a deeper spiritual connection to those with a northern European heritage. Authors such as Jenny Blain have argued that "Celtic Shamanism" is a "construction" and an "ahistoric concept".

== Neo-Druidism ==
Neo-Druidism is a form of modern spirituality or religion that generally promotes harmony and worship of nature gods. Many forms of modern Druidism are Neopagan religions, whereas others are instead seen as philosophies that are not necessarily religious in nature. Arising from the 18th century Romanticist movement in England, which glorified the ancient Celtic peoples of the Iron Age, the early Neo-druids aimed to imitate the Iron Age Celtic priests who were also known as druids. At the time, little accurate information was known about these ancient priests, and the modern druidic movement has no actual connection to them, despite some claims to the contrary made by modern druids. Neo-Druid organizations include:

- Ár nDraíocht Féin (ADF), formed in 1983
- Church of the Universal Bond
- Order of Bards, Ovates and Druids (OBOD), formed in 1964
- Reformed Druids of North America (RDNA), formed in 1963
- The Druid Network, the first contemporary pagan organization to be recognized as a charity in the United Kingdom
- The Druid Order, formed c. 1910 but claiming origins as early as 1717
- Anglesey Druid Order, formed 1999 and centring on Welsh mythology.

== Celtic Wicca ==
Celtic Wicca is a modern tradition of Wicca that incorporates some elements of Celtic mythology. It employs the same basic theology, rituals and beliefs as most other forms of Wicca. Celtic Wiccans use the names of Celtic deities, mythological figures, and seasonal festivals within a Wiccan ritual structure and belief system, rather than a historically Celtic one.

== See also ==
- Ancient Celtic religion
- Celtic mythology
- Irish mythology
- List of Neopagan movements
- Neopaganism in the United Kingdom
- Neopaganism in the United States
- Scottish mythology
- Welsh mythology
