= Druid order =

Druid Order may refer to:

- Present day druidic orders as described in Neo-druidry
- The historical meaning of the word Druid
- A group called The Druid Order
