= George Watson MacGregor-Reid =

Scottish modern druid and union activist (died 1946)

- MacGregor-Reid as he appears in a 1907 copy of the Nature Cure Annual
- Born: Uncertain
- Died: 12 August 1946; Blackboys, Sussex, England
- Burial place: Cannington Cemetery, England
- Occupations: Modern Druid, union activist
- Spouse: Annie Maria Somers MacGregor-Reid
- Children: 1

George Watson MacGregor-Reid (died 12 August 1946) was a Scottish modern Druid and union activist, who was the Chief Druid of the Druid Order from 1909 to 1946. He established and led the Church of the Universal Bond. Little is known of his early life and birth, but MacGregor-Reid came to work on the sea and by 1888 he was involved in seaman trade union activities. He played a significant role in promoting modern Druidry.

== Biography ==
=== Early life and union activity ===
Ascertaining accurate information about MacGregor-Reid's life is complicated by the fact that he often made contradictory claims regarding his biography, and many of the claims that he made about his life have conflicted against other surviving evidence. The historian Adam Stout noted that "all lines must be read between, all statements externally verified". No clear facts about his early life are known, with the historian Ronald Hutton stating that "the only certainties [about his early life] are that he was a Scot who initially made his living, in some fashion, from the sea".

MacGregor-Reid made various competing claims about where and when he was born. In 1889, he claimed to have been born at Dunvegan on the Isle of Skye in 22 February 1850. This was five years before Scotland introduced official registration, meaning that it cannot be verified. Later in life, he was celebrating his birthday on 7 October and claimed to have been born in India. Another possibility is that he was born in Anderston, Lanarkshire, in 1862, with the Scottish registry recording a George Watson MacGregor-Reid who was born here to a nautical family. Several later accounts held that he grew up without his mother.

In an 1889 interview, MacGregor-Reid claimed that he had joined his uncle as a fisherman at the age of nine, joining the Royal Navy in 1874 after his uncle died. According to this account, he served in the Royal Navy for twelve years, during which time he took part in sea battles in the Eastern Mediterranean. He alleged that in 1886 he joined the Merchant Navy and in 1887 the Coast Seaman's Union in San Francisco. None of these claims have been confirmed by independent evidence.

In July 1888 MacGregor-Reid is recorded as giving lectures at open-air meetings of the Social Democratic Federation (SDF). That year, he also helped to organise a seamen's strike in Clydeside. At one of his SDF meetings, he was introduced to two organisers of the National Amalgamated Sailors' and Firemen's Union, who were impressed in his role in the strike. They sent him to Hull, there to undermine a local union so as to ensure it was replaced by the national one. He was there for six months, and in June 1889 was arrested, convicted and fined for assaulting a blacklegger, at which point the union replaced him.

=== Activity in the United States ===
MacGregor-Reid travelled to the United States, seeking to cement connections between that country's Atlantic ports and the UK-based National Amalgamated Sailors' and Firemen's Union. He succeeded in getting branches of the union established in New York City and Boston by the end of 1889. He was also instrumental in establishing a short lived New York-based International Brotherhood of Dockside Labourers. In the December issue of its magazine, Seafaring, the NASFU stated that MacGregor-Reid's actions on behalf of the group in the U.S. were unsanctioned and claimed that he was misusing the union's funds. At the union's New York convention in April 1890, MacGregor-Reid was expelled from the organisation. Stout nevertheless thought it likely that MacGregor-Reid had travelled to the United States with "some kind of mandate from his Union, however vague".

Remaining in the U.S., MacGregor-Reid next decided to stand for election, something which would have required him to have become a U.S. citizen. In 1892, he stood for the 10th Congressional District of New York as a candidate for the newly founded People's Party. He gained 287 votes, approximately 1% of the total cast.

=== Return to Britain ===
MacGregor-Reid returned to Britain, where in 1893 the Proletarian Publishing Company of Clerkenwell published his pamphlet, The Natural Basis of Civilization. The pamphlet expressed the populist ideas of the People's Party with anarchism, condemning the mainstream political parties and government for mistreating the workers. It called for the abolition of government and the implementation of "a state of voluntary or Anarchist Communism". Stout later noted that there was "a distinctly millennial feel" to the pamphlet.

=== Death ===
MacGregor-Reid died on 12 August 1946, at his home in Blackboys, Sussex. He was cremated at Golders Green Crematorium and his remains were interred in Cannington Cemetery.

== Personal life ==
MacGregor-Reid was a vegetarian. He was married to Annie Maria Somers MacGregor-Reid. Their son, who was a seaman in the Royal Navy, died in 1941, during the Second World War.

Jamie Reid, the artist behind the Sex Pistols graphics, is related to MacGregor-Reid.

== Reception and legacy ==
According to the historian Adam Stout, MacGregor-Reid was "ill at ease with the values and the limitations of contemporary civilization", and thus sought for evidence to undermine it in the ancient past.

Stout described him as "the founding father of modern Druidry", and noted that it was he who "put Druidry at the heart of the Stonehenge summer solstice".
