= Order of Druids =

Fraternal organisation

The Order of Druids
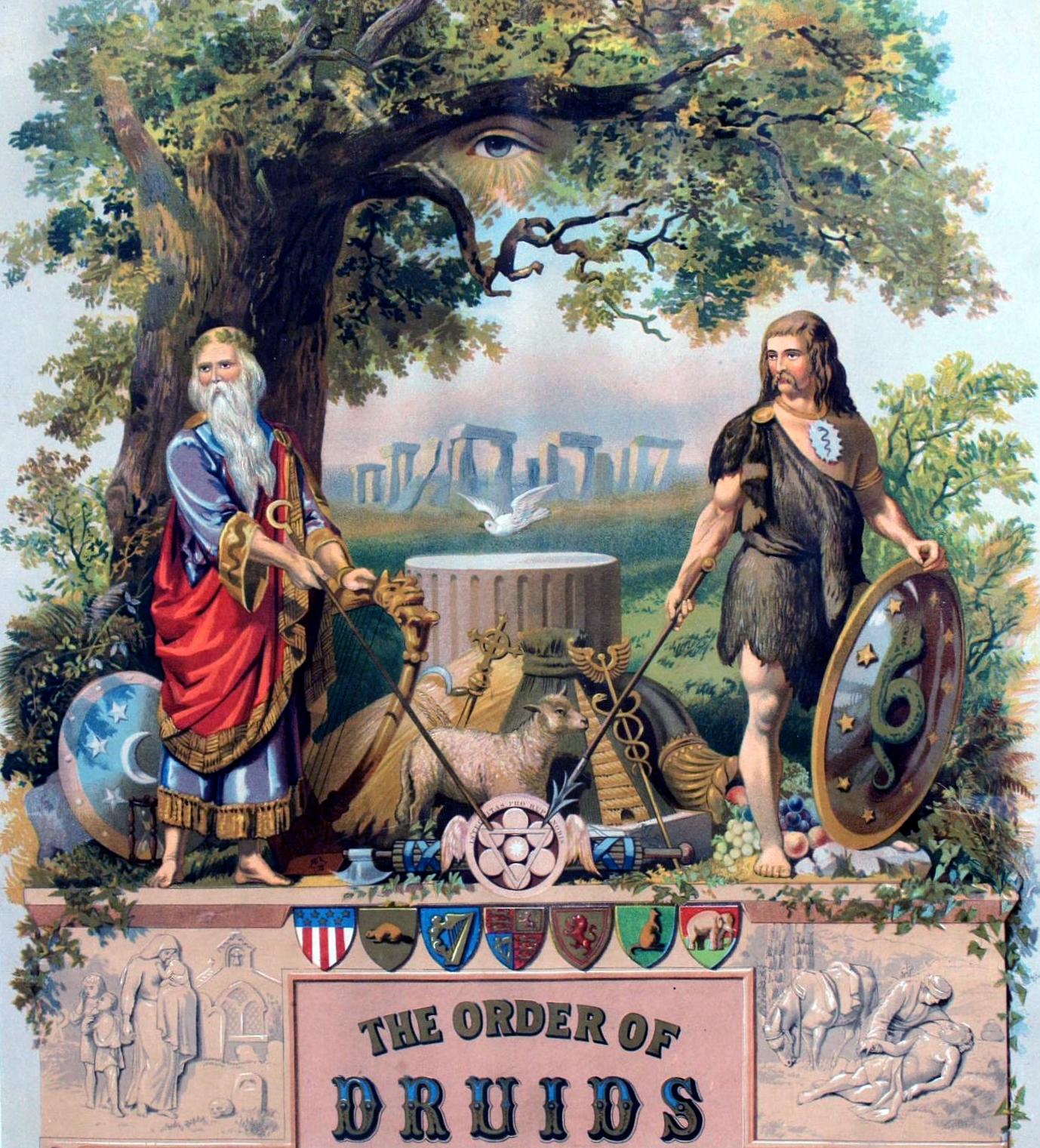
- Abbreviation: OD
- Formation: 1858
- Type: Fraternity and Friendly society
- Headquarters: United Kingdom

The Order of Druids (OD) is a fraternal and benefit organisation founded in England, in 1858 after a schism with the United Ancient Order of Druids. Its motto is integritas pro rupe nobis. The order's emblem is a Druid with a harp and a Celtic warrior with the national emblems of United Kingdom, Australia, India and the United States.

== History ==
During the Victorian era, the most important section was the Sheffield Equalized Independent Druids.

Between the two World Wars, this society was one of the three main Druidic fraternal societies in the British Empire. It was very implanted in Sheffield and in the coalfields of England. After World War II and the generalization of the welfare state, it faded, and the last lodges closed during the 1970s, or turned into insurance companies like the Sheffield Equalized Independent Druids which became the Sheffield Mutual. However, in 2026 it was once again set up, this time in a more modern format, by Vincent Loates.

== See also ==
- Friendly society
- Druidry (modern)
- Ancient Order of Druids
- United Ancient Order of Druids

== Bibliography ==
- Ronald Hutton, Blood and Mistletoe: The History of the Druids in Britain, New Haven, Yale University Press, 2009.
- Victoria Solt Dennis, Friendly and Fraternal Societies: their badges and regalia, London, 2008, p. 107.
