= Rollo Maughfling =

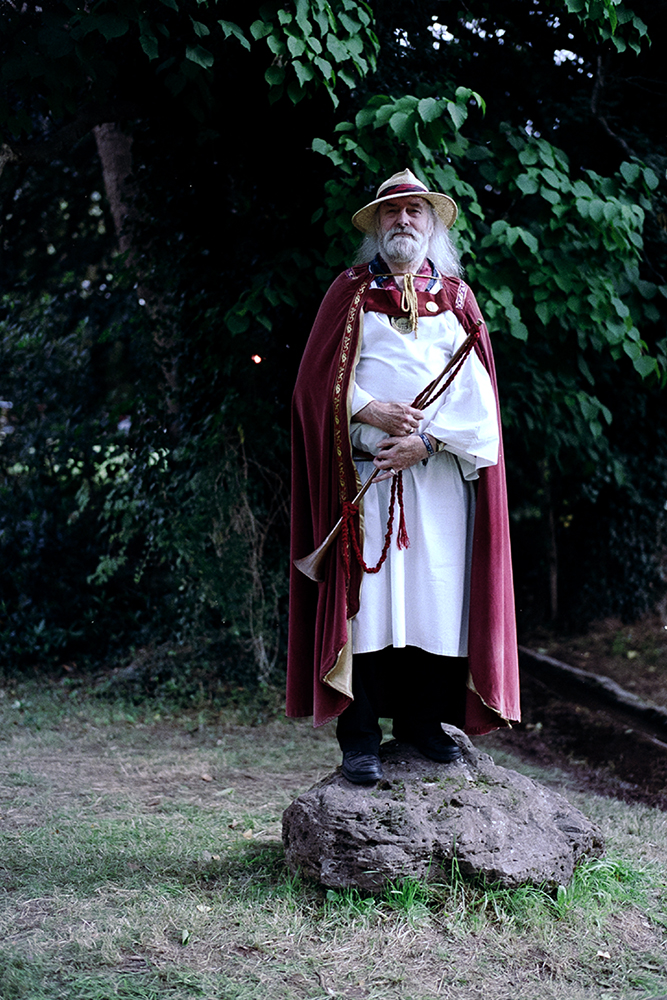
Rollo Maughfling at Green Man Festival in 2018

Rollo Maughfling is the Archdruid of Stonehenge and Britain. He is a long-time campaigner for the restoration of traditional rights of access to druidic sites, and respect for ancient druidic rituals. He is also a founder member of the Council of British Druid Orders.

== Background ==
Rollo Maughfling was born in Redruth, Cornwall in 1949. His father was an agricultural contractor. He came into contact with Druidic culture very early on in his life having been taken to Druidic ceremonies from the age of four. His father was a close friend of the Archdruid and Grand Bard of Cornwall. Rollo was educated at Bryanston School before leaving for London and becoming involved in the 1960s counter-culture publication The International Times as well as making friends with John Michell and encountering Alex Sanders.

== Work ==
At the age of 16 Rollo left his school and home behind to move to London, becoming involved with the underground newspaper The International Times and establishing the Notting Hill Free School. In the early 70s he retreated to Glastonbury where he would spend the next seventeen years practising as a psychotherapist while developing interests in alternative medicine, Druidism and megalithic culture.

Rollo became head of The Glastonbury Order of Druids in 1970, with a ceremony being made for the order to go public on Glastonbury Tor on May Day 1988. This was followed by another ceremony at Stonehenge during Summer Solstice of the same year. As Archdruid of Glastonbury and England Rollo presides over seventeen different Druid orders representing some 15,000 Druids. He has described Druidry as "the nature religion of Albion" and considers animism and the spirits of trees to be important, particularly the oak. Rollo sometimes uses a primary chant of three vowels I-A-O to represent the three Druidic rays of light.

In 1988 Rollo was approached by representatives of different Druid orders where he was officially ordained as Archdruid of Britain. A year later The Council of British Druid Orders was formed in an attempt to reclaim rights of access to Stonehenge.

In 2009 Rollo was involved in efforts to rebury Charlie, a skeletal human remain on display at the National trust museum in Avebury.

Rollo has continued to work for free and open access to Stonehenge through meetings involving the local council of Salisbury and other interested parties including other Druid groups and individuals, the National Trust, English Heritage and the police. As part of this effort he has also exercised influence over the traffic regulation enquiries for this area. Rollo has led public demonstrations against a tunnel being built underneath the stones. He has also been successful in efforts to fund an illuminated acoustic stage during open access.

== Books ==
- Druidlore Issue 1, Druidlore ASIN B00E4D3RAY 1997
