= Arthur Uther Pendragon =

UK Neo-Druid activist

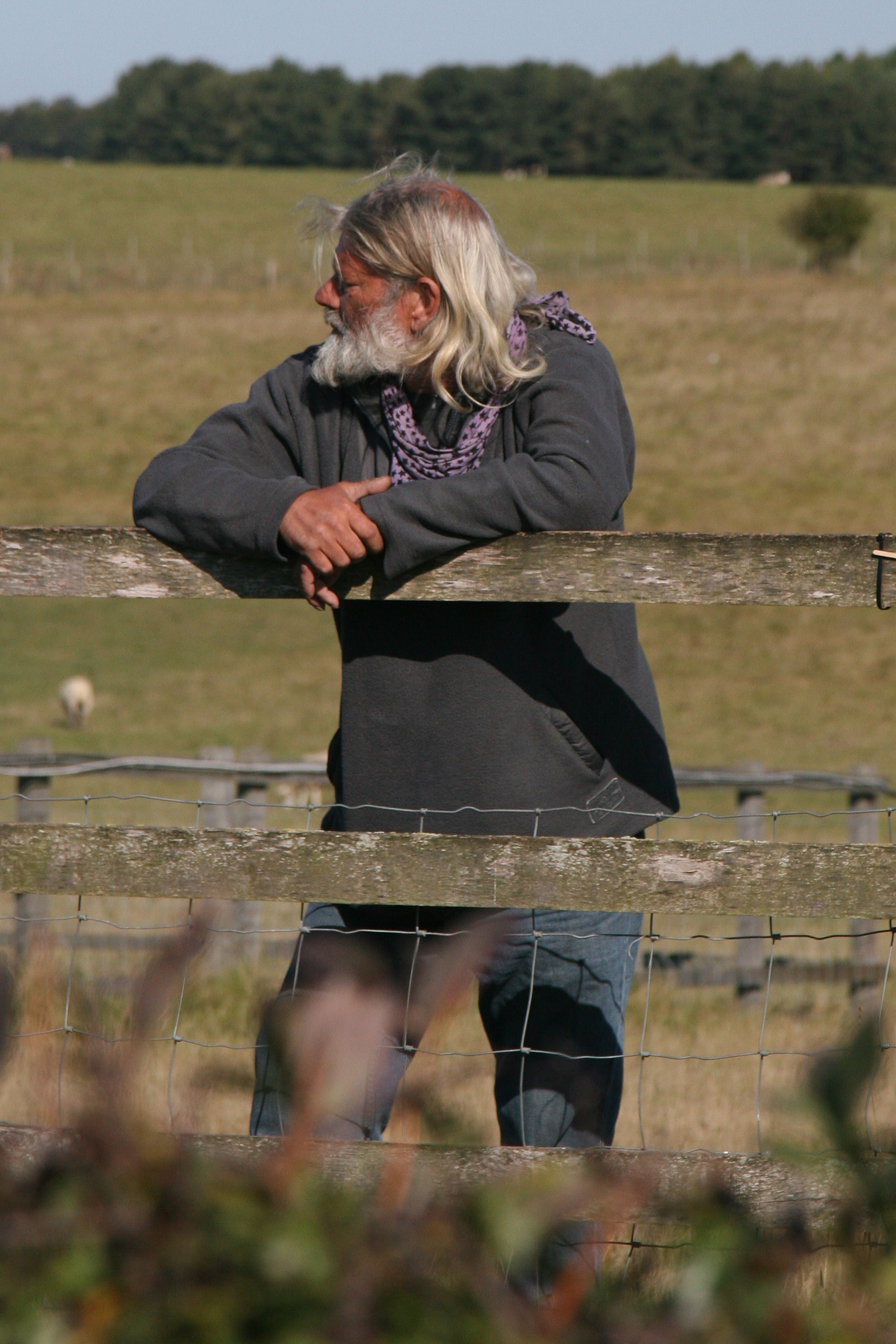
- Born: John Timothy Rothwell; 5 April 1954 (age 72); Wakefield, Yorkshire, England
- Years active: 1970s-2024
- Title: Titular Head and Chosen Chief, Raised Druid King of Britain
- Children: 1
- Website: warband.org.uk

Arthur Uther Pendragon (born John Timothy Rothwell, 5 April 1954) is a British eco-campaigner, Neo-Druid leader, media personality, and self-declared reincarnation of King Arthur, a name by which he is also known. Pendragon was the "battle chieftain" of the Council of British Druid Orders.

== Early life ==
Born to a working-class family in Wakefield, Yorkshire Pendragon served in the British Army's Royal Hampshire Regiment before being discharged following an injury. Identifying as a greaser, he formed a biker club known as the Gravediggers, moving in counter-cultural circles at free festivals around Britain.

== Career ==
After reading a book on King Arthur by the occultist Gareth Knight, he concluded that he was the reincarnation of the mythical king and changed his name by deed poll. He formed the Loyal Arthurian Warband out of his supporters and began describing himself as a Druid. Angered that English Heritage charged entry to visit Stonehenge, using the money for restoration and preservation of the archaeological site in Wiltshire, between 1990 and 1991 he picketed outside the site on a daily basis.

Later that decade he joined various eco-protests against road development across Britain and, with the Council of British Druid Orders, campaigned for open access to Stonehenge during the solstices. For several years, Pendragon engaged in direct action protests and was repeatedly arrested. English Heritage agreed to implement open access at the solstice in 2000. Pendragon later focused on campaigning for the return of human remains removed from Stonehenge by archaeologists in 2008. He continued to call for free access to the site.

=== Becoming Arthur Pendragon: 1986–1991 ===
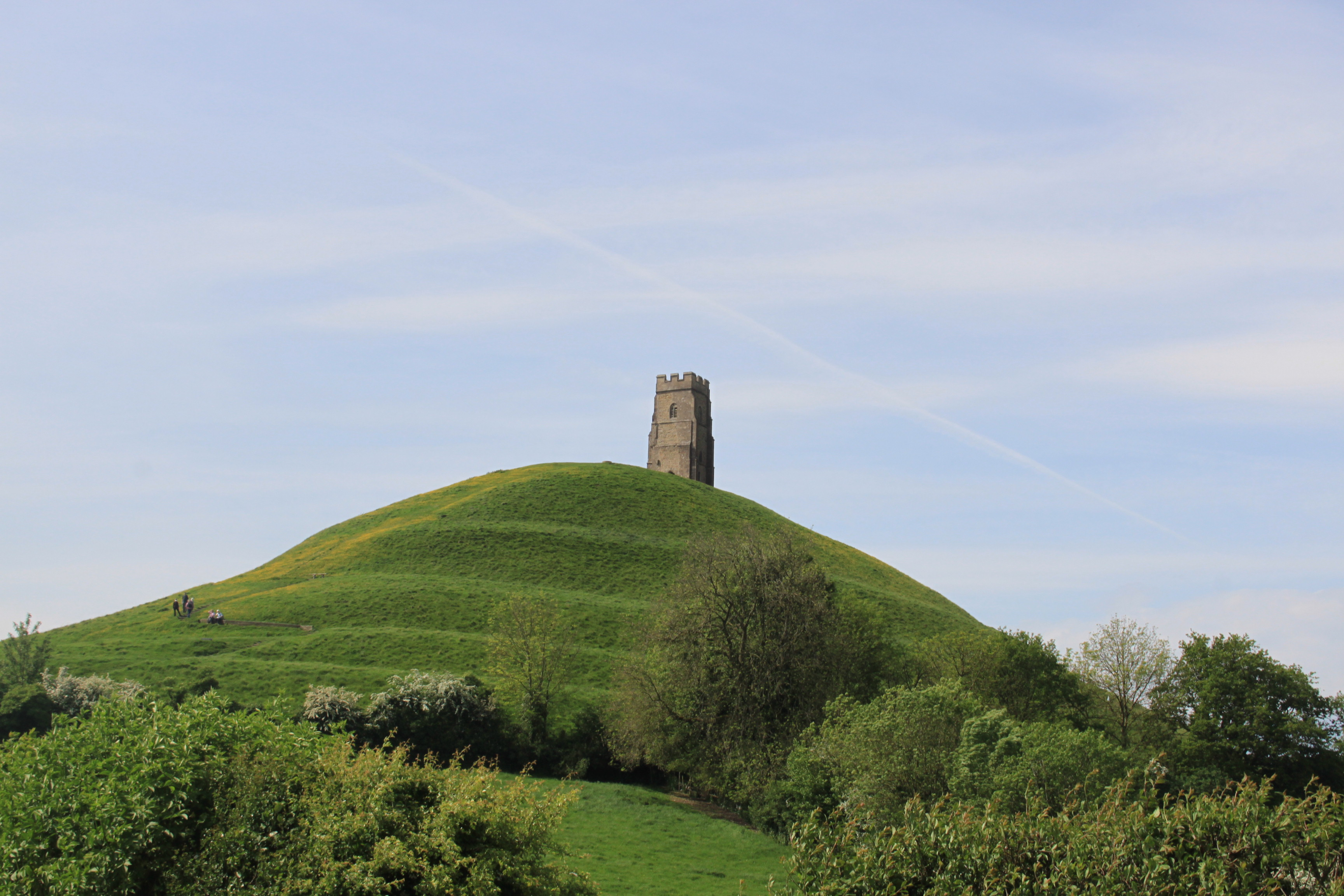
Pendragon moved to Glastonbury and attended one of his earliest Druidic rites at Glastonbury Tor (pictured)

In 1986 he bought a sword called Excalibur in a Farnborough shop; its seller stated that it had been the prop in the 1981 film Excalibur.

== Activism ==
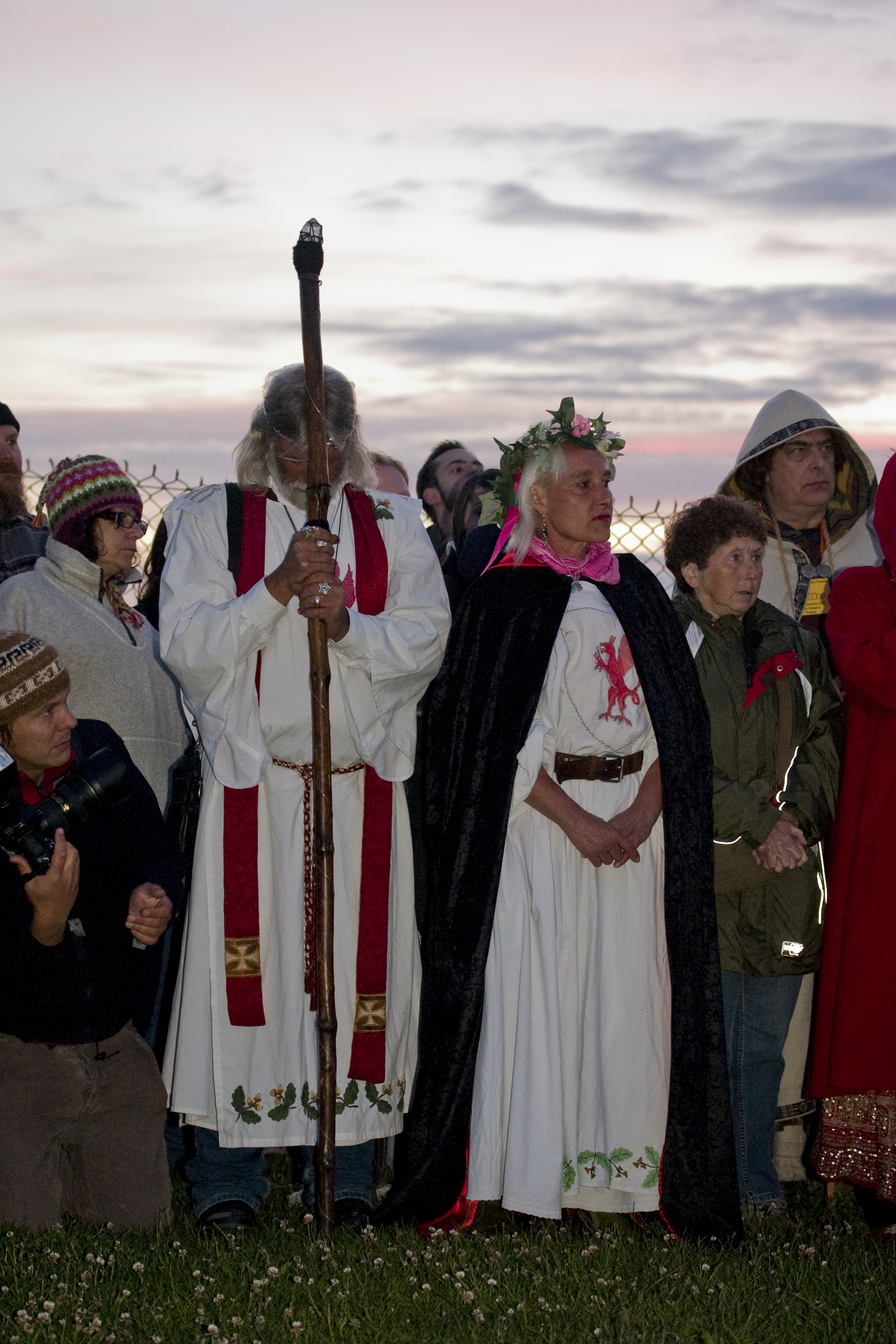
Arthur Pendragon attending the 2010 Stonehenge Summer Solstice ritual

=== Stonehenge ===
Pendragon is best known for his legal battles with English Heritage regarding the monument of Stonehenge in Wiltshire, a site of great religious significance to Neo-Druids. Throughout the 1990s, he campaigned for the removal of the four-mile exclusion zone which was established each year during the summer solstice. On 19 October 1998, with assistance from organisations such as Liberty who acted as his counsel, Pendragon had his case heard by the European Court of Human Rights in Strasbourg. He claimed that the exclusion zone around Stonehenge was restricting his freedom of thought, conscience, religion and freedom of expression, in contravention of Articles 9, 10 and 11 of the European Convention of Human Rights. The court decided in favour of the UK government. However, the exclusion zone was lifted the following year, after an unrelated case brought before the House of Lords ruled that the public have a right to assembly on a public highway.

In June 2008, Pendragon set up a protest camp on a byway near the monument, demanding free access to Stonehenge for everyone. He insisted that the fences surrounding the site should be removed, and that the two nearby A roads (the A344 and A303) should be closed or redirected. He occupied the byway for ten months, and obtained 8,000 signatures in support of his petition. On 24 April 2009, he was ordered by Salisbury County Court to dismantle his camp and leave, following complaints from Wiltshire Council that he was obstructing traffic. Pendragon defied the order. He finally ended his protest on 19 May, after English Heritage announced plans to move a section of the A303 underground, and to create a new visitor centre about a mile-and-a-half away from the stones.

In August 2011, Pendragon filed a High Court appeal calling for the cremated remains of more than 40 bodies to be immediately reburied. The remains had been exhumed from a burial site at Stonehenge in 2008, to be studied at Sheffield University. The appeal was rejected. Pendragon has also voiced his opposition to English Heritage's plan to display three more sets of human remains at the new visitor centre, claiming that out of respect to the ancient British ancestors, replica bones should be on view instead.

In 2020, English Heritage and the authorities controlling access to Stonehenge agreed along with members of the Druid and pagan communities that the Summer Solstice would not be physically observed as it used to be due to COVID-19 lockdowns. In an interview with the BBC Arthur Pendragon stated his understanding for this decision, noting that the Spring Equinox ceremony had also been cancelled. On the evening preceding the Solstice and on the morning following Arthur Pendragon, along with author C. J. Stone and around 50 revellers as well as other Druids held gatherings involving ritual and protest in the publicly accessible area just outside Stonehenge and past the Heel Stone; part of the protest involved a placard making a statement against the proposed road tunnel under Stonehenge, this being the latest development in protest against a tunnel. Arthur has stated publicly that he intends to bring legal challenges against Wiltshire Police, Wiltshire Council and English Heritage for refusing to allow him to park on any of the roads near Stonehenge as parking in the Stonehenge car park caused him to miss the Solstice sunrise.

=== Poll tax protest ===
On 24 January 1994, Pendragon was summoned to magistrates' court after refusing to pay two years' worth of poll tax. His case was presided over by Lord Tenby, who allowed Pendragon to wear his robes and sword in court, and allowed him to swear oath on his sword. At the end of the hearing, the case went against Pendragon and he was ordered to pay the money owed.

=== Other legal cases ===
Pendragon has been arrested, mainly for trespass, over 30 times. Whilst in prison on remand, his requests to wear his Neo-Druidic robe were rejected and he was provided with a prison uniform. Pendragon, refusing to comply with these lawful orders, then refused to wear clothing, and was placed in solitary confinement naked.

== Political career ==
Pendragon is a self-proclaimed English eccentric, and says that this helps him in his political work. He has stood in several elections — most recently as an Independent candidate for Salisbury in 2010, 2015, 2017, 2019 and 2024.

== Personal life ==
In 2003, Pendragon published his autobiography, The Trials of Arthur (revised 2012), co-written with counterculture author C. J. Stone. In it, he claimed to be one of those Druids "whose motivations are fundamentally political and radical". It was also noted that Pendragon viewed Britain as "a land, not an identity", "a feeling" and "it welcomes all who arrive on these shores". Pendragon said his patriotism was "inclusive, not exclusive... [and] welcoming of other cultures and other stories". The book further stated that Pendragon could be self-centred, vain, and impatient with others, and that he was sometimes unable to see perspectives other than his own but it conceded that he was "a man who laughed at himself" and acknowledged that some in Britain's Druidic community thought Pendragon brought Druidry into disrepute with his politicised campaigns and direct action tactics.

== Media ==
Pendragon’s media presence includes a notable appearance in the 1997 television series Monarchy: The Nation Decides, which examined the role of the British Crown in modern society. His life and activism have also been the focus of multiple documentaries, including the 2013 release Being King Arthur, which explores his claims to the Pendragon legacy and his legal battles surrounding Stonehenge, and the 2019 film Blessings from the Front, which documents his ongoing spiritual work and leadership within the Druid community.
