= United Ancient Order of Druids =

Fraternal organisation

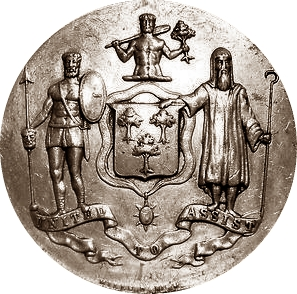
- Abbreviation: UAOD
- Formation: 1833
- Type: Fraternity and Friendly society
- Headquarters: United Kingdom
- Website: http://igld.net/

The United Ancient Order of Druids (UAOD) is a fraternal organisation founded in England, in 1833 after a schism with the Ancient Order of Druids. Its last Lodge in England, "Caracus", closed in 1999 but the UAOD still remains in several countries as the United States, Australia, Germany, and Northern European countries.Its motto is United to assist.

== History ==
The creation in 1833 of the United Ancient Order of Druids was the result of a split in the Ancient Order of Druids; a significant part of the members decided to create a druidic order more open to different social classes, structured as a benefit society and registered by government. During the first decades, the UAOD kept the same emblem as the AOD (a shield with three oaks surrounded by a Celtic warrior and a druid), changing the motto to united to assist. Very soon, the UAOD proved to be a great success and many of its members travelling abroad created new lodges in United States of America (1839), Australia (1851), New Zealand, and the German empire (1872). In 1858, the UAOD separated itself in two parts, and a new fraternal society, the Order of Druids was created. After World War II the organisation faded, as the generalisation of the welfare state provided people with all that was its purpose. Its last Lodge in England, "Caracus", closed in 1999 but the UAOD still remains in several countries as the United States, Australia, Germany, and Northern European countries.

== United States ==
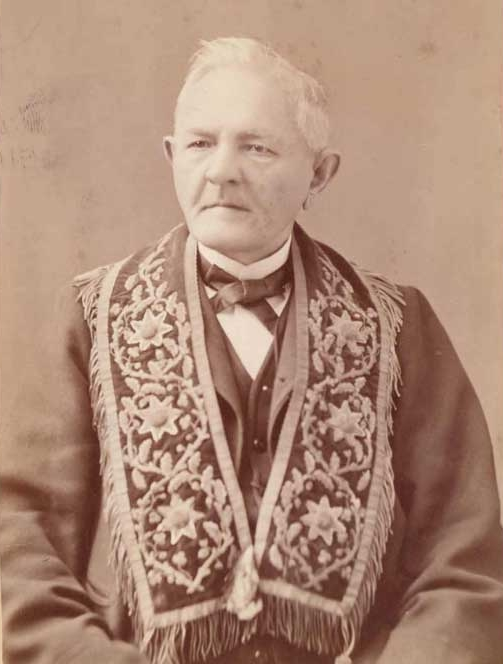
Frederick Sieg, founder of the UAOD in California.

The George Washington Lodge #1, the first lodge in the United States, was established in New York City in 1839. By 1979 the group was apparently defunct as a national organization. Despite the decentralization of the U.A.O.D. as a national organization, the United Ancient Order of Druids of California (or simply "Druids of California")--founded in Placerville, CA by Fredrick Sieg in the nineteenth century—continues to exist. It is governed by a "Grand Grove" with coordinated 13 subsidiary Groves and numerous Circles spread across the state. California Grove No. 1 was officially reinstated in Placerville, CA in 2017-18 and continues to enjoy a modest membership as of 2019. The stated mission of the Druids of California is "to promote knowledge, unity, and peace".

== Australia and New Zealand ==
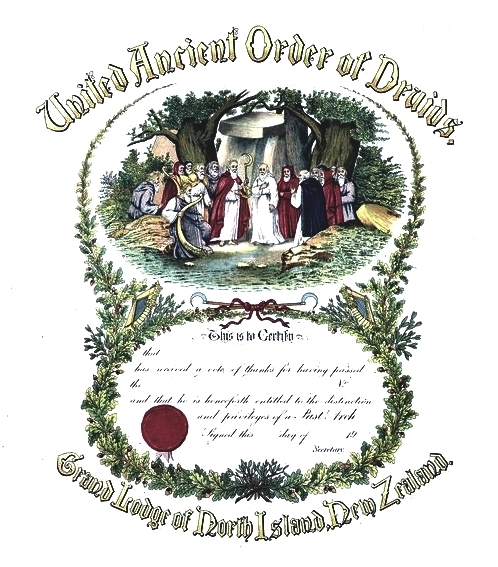
Druid certificate for UAOD New-Zealand.

A Druids Lodge was established in Melbourne in 1851. By 1877 a number of lodges existed in Adelaide: The Adelaide, The Sir James Fergusson, The Allied, The Peace Lodge, the Duke of Brunswick, the Duke of Leinster, the Prince of Wales, The Albert, The Royal and the Adelaide lodge, with a total of 862 members.

A Druids Lodge was established in Wellington in 1879 as the Excelsior Lodge. Its members were drawn from many sectors of New Zealand society and the Wellington Grand Lodge, known as Druids’ Chambers, was their headquarters. Despite diminishing influence and a reduced membership in later years, the society remained a significant organisation until it closed in 1995.

== Germany ==
In 1872, American Druids undertook the task to bring Druidism to the German empire. Joseph Hafky was in charge of charter several Lodges in Berlin, Bremerhaven and Stuttgart.

== Sweden, Denmark, Norway and Iceland ==
As the implantation of druidic lodges in the German empire was a success, inspiring some northern European countries to create their own UAOD Grand Lodges: Sweden (1906), Denmark (1924), Norway (1935) and more recently Iceland (separated from Norway UAOD on February 23, 2023).

== Switzerland ==
In 1976, the first UAOD lodge was created in Switzerland.

== Notable members ==
- Frederick Sieg (1815–1888), founder of the UAOD in California.
- Byron B. Brainard (1894–1940), city council member, Los Angeles, California.

== Bibliography ==
- Peter Clark, British Clubs and Societies 1580-1680, New York, Oxford University Press, 2000.
- Ronald Hutton, Blood and Mistletoe: The History of the Druids in Britain, New Haven, Yale University Press, 2009.
- Wilhelm North, Who Was Henry Hurle, the Founder of the A.O.D.?, London 1932.
- Victoria Solt Dennis, Friendly and Fraternal Societies: their badges and regalia, London, 2008.

== See also ==
- Friendly society
- Druidry (modern)
- Ancient Order of Druids
- Order of Druids
- Secret society
