= Council of British Druid Orders =

Neo-pagan group

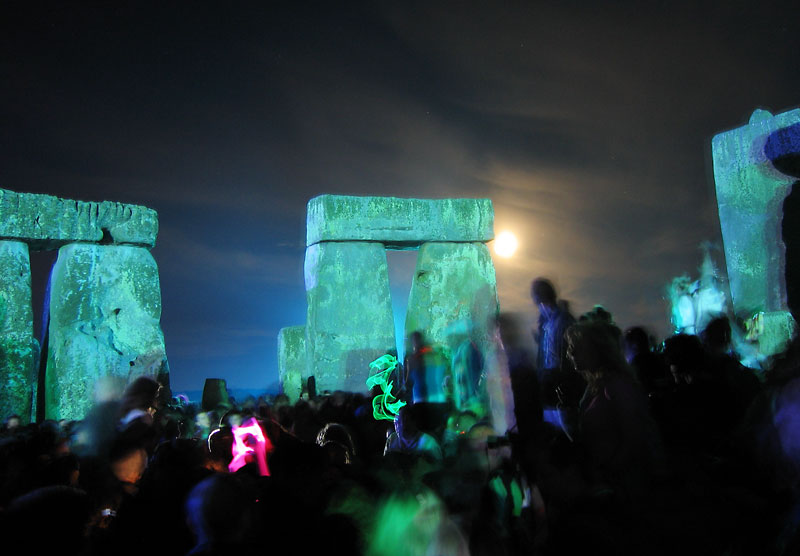
The 2005 mid-summer festival at Stonehenge

The Council of British Druid Orders is a neo-pagan group established in 1989 which was originally formed to facilitate ceremonies at Stonehenge. The council's founder, Tim Sebastion, used the title "Archdruid of Wiltshire, Chosen Chief of the Secular Order of Druids, Conservation Officer for the Council of British Druid Orders and Bard of the Gorsedd of Caer Abiri (Avebury)."

COBDO represents some sixteen British Druid Orders, and Stonehenge celebrations are still its main concern. Following the passing of Tim Sebastion, the main figures within COBDO are Rollo Maughling and Arthur Uther Pendragon, leader of the Loyal Arthurian Warband. The main website for COBDO has expanded beyond coverage of Stonehenge to provide a general description of Druidry as a spiritual faith.

== Activities ==
The group is best known for presiding at mid-summer festivals held since 1999. These festivals are a successor to the Stonehenge Free Festival that was held from 1974 to 1984.

Within the context of Stonehenge, regular meetings representing different Druidic groups and individuals, the National Trust, English Heritage, the local Council, the police and traveller groups are held several times a year both before and after religious celebrations at the stones to discuss issues around open access including transport, road closures, public safety and disability access; members of COBDO are always attendant at these meetings, particularly Rollo Maughling and Arthur Pendragon. Arthur Pendragon has been particularly prominent in protests against local road development as well as open access.

== Notable members ==
- Arthur Uther Pendragon
- Rollo Maughfling
