= Ancient Order of Druids =

English fraternal organisation

- Abbreviation: AOD
- Formation: 28 November 1781
- Founder: Henry Hurle
- Type: Fraternity and Friendly society
- Headquarters: United Kingdom
- Location(s): United Kingdom and Commonwealth
- Website: Facebook page

The Ancient Order of Druids (AOD) is the oldest neo-druid order in the world. It was formed in London, England, in 1781. Its motto is Dieu, Notre Pays et Roy (old) and Justice, Philanthropy and Brotherly Love.

== History ==
28 November 1781, in the King’s Arms tavern, near Oxford Street, some gentlemen decided to create an association basing the name and some of the iconography upon what was then believed about the ancient druids. Despite a few semantic similarities, initiatory aspects and the use of regalia, the AOD, since its origins, is completely distinct from Freemasonry.

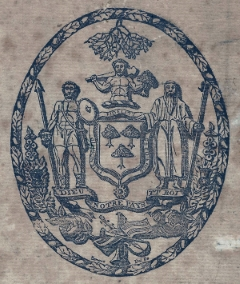
Coat of arms of the Ancient Order of Druids, circa 1830

By the 1920s, two different stories were circling amongst members of the Order regarding its foundation. The first held that it was created by a group of friends who were merchants and artisans who liked to regularly meet at the King's Arms tavern just off Oxford Street in the West End of London. To keep out unwanted intruders, they became a formal society, and chose to adopt the name of the druids at the suggestion of one of their members, a Mr Hurle, who had a particular interest in the ancient druids. The second story held that the group of friends who met at the King's Arms decided, after the death of one of their number, to form an organisation to honour his memory by raising a fund to provide his bereaved mother with enough money to live.

However it was founded, it is known that the first leader or "Archdruid" of the group was the aforementioned Mr Henry Hurle, who the historian Wilhelm North posited, in a 1932 pamphlet, had actually been Henry Hurle, a wealthy carpenter, surveyor and builder who worked at Garlick Hill in London.

=== Development, spread and schism ===
The March 1909 edition of The Druid, the magazine published by the Ancient Order of Druids

The success of the group that met at the King’s Arms, which came to be called Lodge No. 1, spawned the creation of a number of other lodges of the Order being founded elsewhere by new initiates, with Lodge No. 2 being inaugurated on 21 August 1783 and meeting at Rose Tavern, along the Ratcliffe Highway, Wapping. Lodge No. 3 was soon after opened in Westminster, and according to a rumour within the Order, the politician Charles James Fox was initiated into the Order through this lodge by Hurle himself, possibly in an attempt to gain wider popularity amongst the voters in the borough.

By 1785, the AOD had six lodges in London, with a further one located in Ipswich, and by 1791 there was a string of them across southern England. However, in 1794, with the French Revolution causing panic amongst many in the British government, who feared a revolutionary movement at home, great suspicion was cast upon secretive societies, and due to this a number of the lodges shut down, including that in Westminster. Nonetheless, by the start of the nineteenth century, twenty-two lodges remained open. By 1831 this had risen to 193 lodges, and the Order’s membership itself had risen to over 200,000.

However, discontent was rising in the Order. Ever since its inception, its members had come from a variety of different social backgrounds, and many of the poorer members, particularly in the newly-industrial towns in the English Midlands, wanted it to act more like the benefit clubs and friendly societies such as the Odd Fellows (1730), the Shepherds Friendly Society (1826), the Foresters Friendly Society (1834), which were then rising in popularity. These benefit clubs collected membership fees into a central fund that they used to care for members who were too ill to work, or unable to pay for their funerals. In particular, these dissenting voices wanted to cease sending a percentage of their funds to the Grand Lodge (formerly Lodge No. 1), and to introduce more democratic reforms within the movement, so that the Archdruids of each lodge had a larger say over the movement. In the first years of the 1830s, a group of lodges decided to found an elected United Provisional Committee, but in retaliation the Grand Lodge and its allies expelled them from the Order, further galvanising the organisation into two camps. In 1833, about half of the AOD, numbering over a hundred lodges, split from the Grand Lodge in protest and formed the United Ancient Order of Druids. This event has subsequently become known as "the Great Secession" amongst members of the Order.

=== Modern history ===
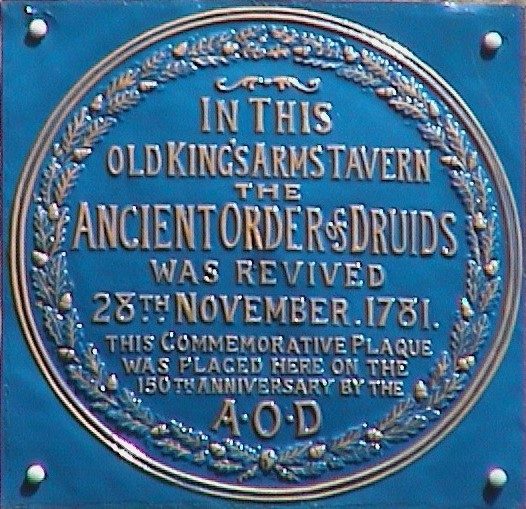
Plaque celebrating the revival of the order in London

After World War I, the relations between the AOD and the UAOD and the Order of Druids (which split from the UAOD) eased, and each year a joint congress was organized in Great-Britain. During World War II, much of the Order's archives had been destroyed during The Blitz. After World War II, membership in fraternal organisations declined and the UAOD and OD eventually ceased to operate in the UK.

In 2026, the Ancient Order of Druids still operates as a fraternal order (UK and France) and also as a philanthropic and charitable organisation (UK).

== Organization ==
The Ancient Order of Druids is ruled by the Imperial Grand Archdruid.

== Relationship to druidry ==
It is the earliest known English group to be founded based upon the iconography of the ancient druids, who were priest-like figures in Iron Age Celtic paganism. As such, the Order was an early influence upon the development of the Neo-druidic movement, however it differs from most contemporary Neo-druidic groups as it is "not a religious organisation – in fact any discussion on religion or politics is forbidden within the lodge rooms". Instead, its members are expected to preserve its motto (in French) : "Dieu(x), Notre Pays et Roy" [God(s), our Country and the King] and "to practice the main principles attributed to the early Druids, particularly those of justice, benevolence and friendship."

Due to its long and prestigious history, the Ancient order of Druids has regularly been confronted with attempts to "capture" its image, name or symbols. In the past, several Neo-druidic associations or organizations -having absolutely no connection with the AOD- did not hesitate to copy its name (or partly use it), creating highly regrettable confusions..

== Notable members ==
Among the personalities who have been members of the AOD are:

- Charles Dibdin, composer, musician, dramatist, novelist, singer and actor (1745-1814)
- Charles James Fox, politician and abolitionist (1749–1806)
- William Makepeace Thackeray, novelist, author and illustrator (1811–1863)
- Henry Taunt, photographer (1842–1922)
- George Spencer-Churchill, 8th Duke of Marlborough (1844–1892)
- Sir Edmund Antrobus, 4th Baronet, owner of Stonehenge (1848–1915)
- Francis Greville, 5th Earl of Warwick, British officer and politician (1853–1924)
- George Godolphin Osborne, 10th Duke of Leeds, politician (1862–1927)
- Charles Spencer-Churchill, 9th Duke of Marlborough (1871–1934)
- Sir Winston Churchill, Prime Minister and statesman (1874–1965)
- George Child Villiers, 8th Earl of Jersey (2 June 1873 – 31 December 1923)

== See also ==
- Fraternal society
- United Ancient Order of Druids

== Bibliography ==
- A.O.D., Ancient Order of Druids. Introductory Book, London, T. Brettell, 1840.
- CLARK Peter, British Clubs and Societies 1580–1680, New York, Oxford University Press, 2000.
- COX Henry, The Ancient Druids, Coventry, Whitefriars Press, 1929.
- CROSOER E.T., A brief treatise on the history of international druidism – Origin of the Ancient Order of Druids, London, Imperial Grand Lodge, nd.
- DAUDÉ Romain, Les druides britanniques, ordres fraternels et sociétés mutuelles de 1781 à nos jours, Cercle britannique de Perpignan, 2020. ISBN 978-2-9542050-2-1
- DAUDÉ Romain, "Une sociabilité britannique de l'époque géorgienne à nos jours, expression d'une conscience nationale, les Druides", Mémoires de l'Académie des Hauts Cantons, 2020-2021, pp. 106–130. ISBN 978-2-9544931-7-6
- HARRISON David & LOMAX Fred, Freemasonry & fraternal societies, Addlestone, Lewis Masonic, 2015.
- HUTTON Ronald, Blood and Mistletoe: The History of the Druids in Britain, New Haven, Yale University Press, 2009.
- NORTH Wilhelm, Who Was Henry Hurle, the Founder of the A.O.D.?, London, 1932.
- SOLT DENNIS Victoria, Friendly and Fraternal Societies: their badges and regalia, London, A Shire Book, 2008.
