= Henge of Keltria =

International druid order

- Abbreviation: HoK
- Formation: 1988
- Founder: Tony Taylor
- Dissolved: 2017
- Type: Modern Druidry; Neopaganism
- Headquarters: United States
- Website: keltria.org

The Henge of Keltria (HoK) was an international druid order, founded in 1988 as a religious and educational organization. It was a 501(c)(3) nonprofit corporation. It is commonly regarded as being one of the first explicitly Celtic-focused American Druid Orders. The order drew upon the Mythological Cycle of Irish mythology and some other early Celtic/British texts for inspiration.

== History ==
The Henge of Keltria began organizing in 1988 as a "breakaway" organization from Ár nDraíocht Féin (ADF) with initial groves in Minnesota, Massachusetts, and Texas. The bylaws of the organization divided the Order into two major divisions. First was a secular organization consisting of a president, vice-president, secretary, treasurer, and three ad hoc trustees. This Board of Trustees was responsible for all operational activities of the organization. The second division was a religious order consisting of an Elected Archdruid and elected Elders who comprised the Council of Elders which provided the theological direction for the church and maintained religious standards throughout the Order. The Henge registered with the state of Minnesota as a non-profit corporation in 1995 and received its 501(c)(3) determination letter from the IRS in 2005. By 1989, it began publication of a quarterly newsletter, "Henge Happenings," for its membership. Also in 1989, the HoK began publishing Keltria: Journal of Druidism and Celtic Magick as a publicly available journal. Keltria Journal is more article-driven and less newsy than the newsletter. Keltria Journal ceased publication in 1998 after 39 issues and took a 13-year hiatus. Publication of the Keltria Journal began again in 2012. As of 31 Oct 2017, The Henge corporation was officially dissolved and new membership is no longer being accepted.

== Principal Beliefs ==
The Keltrian Druid practice recognized three levels of experience: Ring of the Birch, Ring of the Yew, and Ring of the Oak. It also promoted three areas of service: Bardic service, Seer's service, and the Druid's service. The three foundations of Keltrian Druidism: Belief was secondary in Keltrian Druidism. Actions and practice determined the path that an individual was on. The goal of Keltrian Druidism was to develop a spiritual relationship with the ancestors, nature spirits, and gods and goddesses in a Celtic context.

== Publications ==
The following is a list of publications that the Henge of Keltria produced. "Henge Happenings" was published quarterly and Keltria: Journal of Druidism and Celtic Magick was published on an occasional basis.

• "Henge Happenings:" The Official Newsletter of the Henge of Keltria

• Keltria: Journal of Druidism and Celtic Magick

• Serpent's Stone: A Journal of Druidic Wisdom

• The Henge of Keltria Book of Ritual

• The Henge of Keltria Grove Leaders Handbook
