= Church of the Universal Bond =

Religious group founded in Britain

The Church of the Universal Bond, a religious group founded in Britain in the early twentieth century by George Watson MacGregor Reid, promoted socialist revolution, anti-imperialism and sun worship.

== History ==
Reid founded the Church of the Universal Bond in 1912. Initially also interested in Zoroastrianism, Reid had become increasingly attracted to Druidry. A popularly accepted theory at that time was that Stonehenge had been built by Druids as a solar temple, so his church began holding rituals there. Their worship was permitted to continue when the site was given to the state in 1918.

Although only commanding around 50 adherents in its early days, the Church was instrumental in forming the link in the popular imagination between Stonehenge and Druids – despite the efforts of archaeologists to discourage the connection.

In 1924, the Office of Works permitted the Church to scatter the ashes of cremated former members at Stonehenge, something which drew significant protests from the Society of Antiquaries, the Wiltshire Archaeological Society, the Royal Archaeological Institute and famous archaeologists such as O. G. S. Crawford. The outcry persuaded the government to withdraw permission and in 1932 the Church officially moved its rites from the monument to Normanton Gorse nearby.

After the Second World War, Reid's son Robert took over leadership of the Church. It was able to regain midsummer access to Stonehenge throughout the 1950s, 60s and 70s, to the dismay of many leading archaeologists.

When the growing Stonehenge free festival caused the monument to be closed at midsummer in 1985, the Church faded into obscurity. It has maintained a presence at the re-opened solstice festivities since 2000.

== Sources ==
- Hutton, R, From Universal Bond to Public Free For All, British Archaeology 83, July–August 2005 p11.
