= Druidry (modern) =

Modern nature-based spiritual movement

Druidry

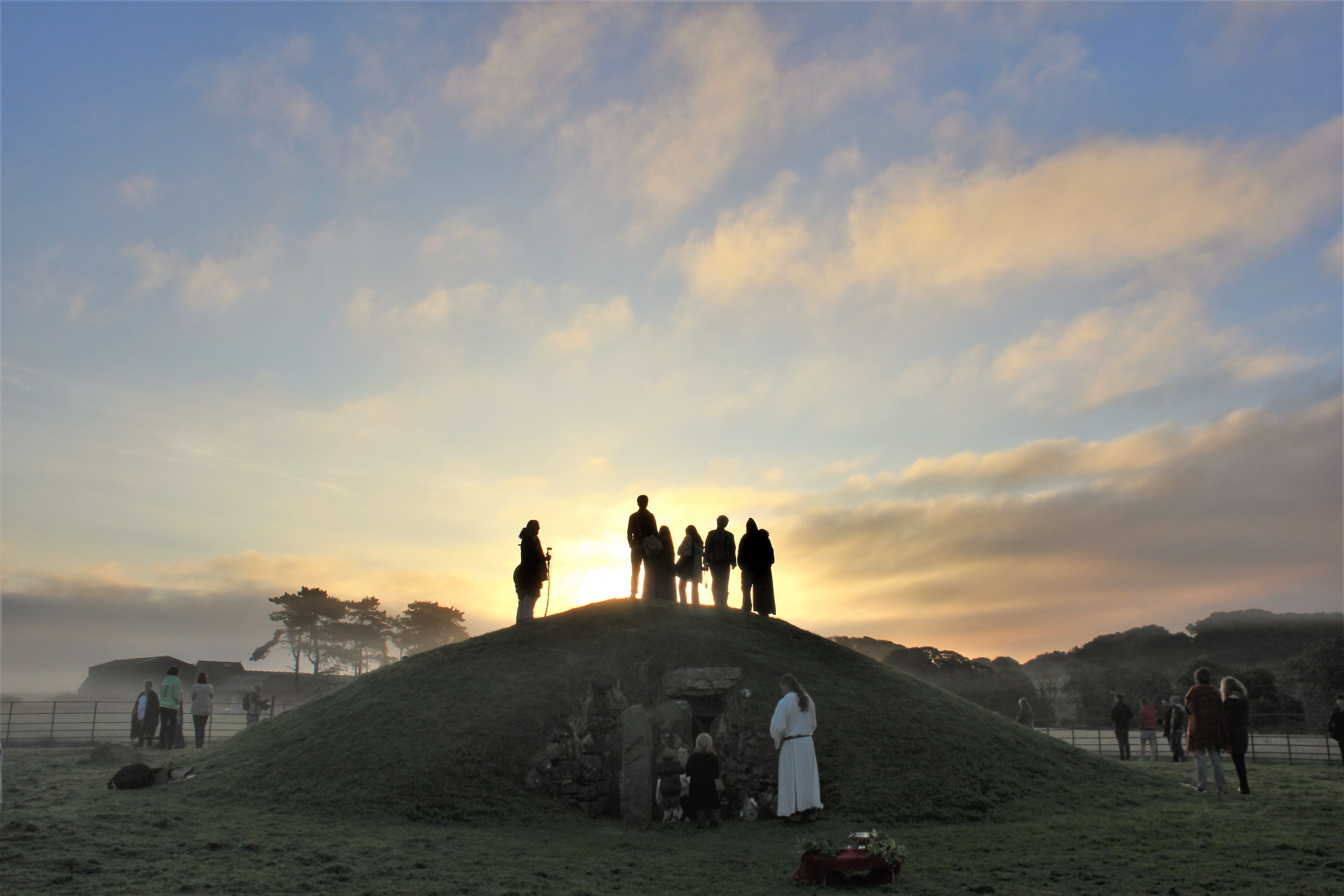
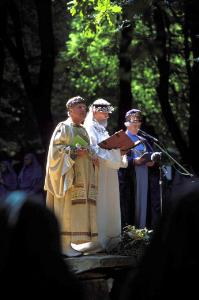
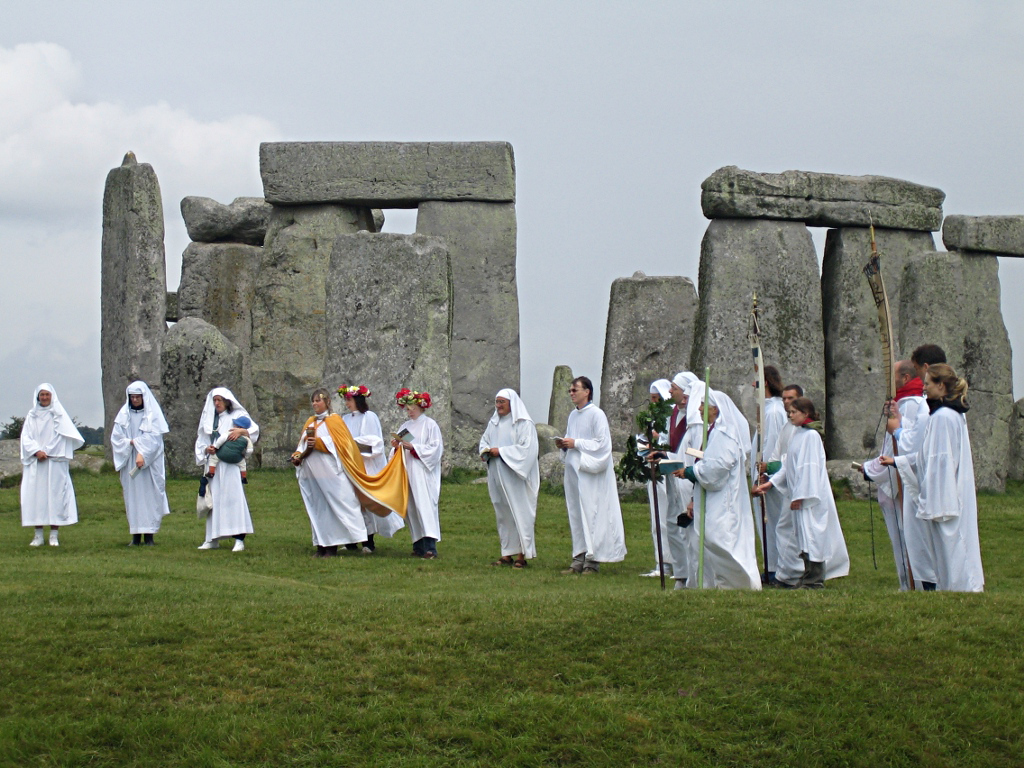
- Region: Worldwide - particularly active in Britain and Ireland
- Number of followers: est. 250,000

Druidry, sometimes termed Druidism, is a modern movement of spirituality or religion that promotes the cultivation of honorable relationships with the physical landscapes, flora, fauna, and diverse peoples of the world, as well as with nature deities, and spirits of nature and place. Theological beliefs among modern Druids are diverse; however, all modern Druids venerate the divine essence of nature. While there are significant variations in the expression and practice of modern Druidry, a core set of spiritual and devotional practices may be observed, including: meditation; prayer/conversation with deities and spirits; the use of extra-sensory methods of seeking wisdom and guidance; the use of nature-based spiritual frameworks to structure devotional practices and rituals; and a regular practice of nature connection and environmental stewardship work.

Neo-Druidry emerged in 18th-century Britain as part of the Romantic movement, which idealized the perceived spiritual wisdom and natural harmony of ancient Celtic societies. Early neo-Druids sought to emulate the Iron Age priestly class known as the druids, despite the limited and often speculative historical knowledge available at the time. As such, modern Druidic traditions are not directly descended from ancient practices, but rather are modern reconstructions or reinterpretations inspired by Romantic ideals and later scholarly and folkloric sources.

In the late 18th century, modern Druids developed fraternal organizations modeled on Freemasonry that employed the romantic figure of the British Druids and Bards as symbols of the indigenous spirituality of Prehistoric Britain. Some of these groups were purely fraternal and cultural, such as the oldest one that remains, the Ancient Order of Druids, founded in 1781, which created traditions from the national imagination of Britain. Others, in the early 20th century, merged with contemporary movements such as the physical culture movement and naturism. Since the 1980s, some modern druid groups have adopted methodologies similar to those of Celtic Reconstructionist Paganism to create a more historically accurate practice. However, there is still controversy over how closely modern Druidism resembles the Iron Age Druids.

By 2020, modern Druidry had spread to 34 nations across six continents and had taken root in 17 diverse biomes. The importance that modern Druids attributed to Celtic language and culture, circa 2020, varied depending on the physical and cultural environments in which individual Druids lived. By 2020, roughly 92% of world Druids were residing outside the British Isles. While modern Druidry has spread rapidly across the globe, Druids do not proselytize, and 74% of world Druids actively work to keep their spiritual practices private.

== Definition ==
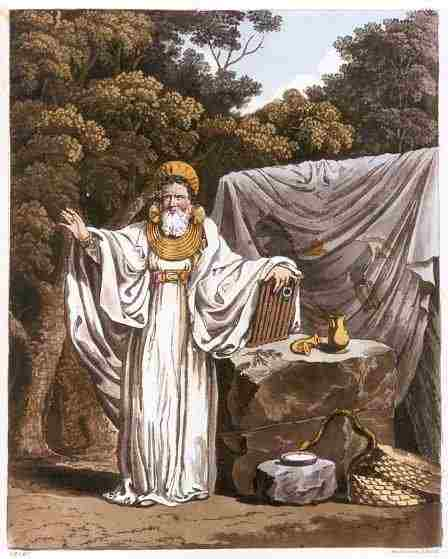
Modern Druidry takes its name from the Iron Age druids referred to in various Greco-Roman sources, as depicted here in a nineteenth-century illustration.

Modern Druidry derives its name from the Celtic magico-religious specialists of Iron Age Western Europe, known as Druids. There is no real historical continuity between the Druids of Iron Age Europe and modern Druids. However, some Druids nevertheless regard modern Druidry as a genuine continuation of the practices of the Iron Age Druids.

The 18th-century figure Iolo Morganwg fabricated what he claimed were early Welsh literary sources and traditions that supposedly dated to the prehistoric Druids. Gorsedd, one of the 18th-century traditions that Morganwg founded, became part of the National Eisteddfod of Wales festival. The concerns of modern Druidry, which include healing the planet and seeking connections with the natural world, are likely very different from those of the Iron Age societies in which the original Druids lived. Another 18th-century fabrication is the Fragments of Ancient Poetry, which was published by James Macpherson between 1760 and 1763. The poems were hugely popular; they were read by many of the notable figures of the period, including Voltaire, Napoleon, and Thomas Jefferson, and the quality of the poetry inspired contemporary comparisons with Homer. Although attributed to the ancient, semi-legendary poet Ossian, the works are believed to have been composed by a wistful Macpherson seeking to recreate Scotland's oral traditions.

Everything presently known about the Iron Age Druids derives from archaeological evidence and Greco-Roman textual sources, rather than material produced by these Druids themselves. Due to the scarcity of knowledge about the Iron Age Druids, their belief system cannot be accurately reconstructed. Some modern Druids incorporate everything that is known about Iron Age Druids into their practices. However, as noted by Irish contemporary paganism scholar Jenny Butler, the historical realities of Iron Age religion are often overlooked by Druids in favour of "a highly romanticised version".

Many modern Druids believe that the practices of the Iron Age Druids should be revived and modified to meet current needs. In Ireland, some Druids have claimed that because the island was never conquered by the Roman Empire, the Iron Age Druids survived there and their teachings were passed down hereditarily until modern times, allowing modern Druids to reclaim them. Some modern Druids claim that they can channel information about the Iron Age Druids.

Druidry has been described as a religion, a new religious movement, a "spiritual movement", and as a nature religion. It has been described as a form of contemporary Paganism, and on the contemporary Pagan spectrum between reconstructionism and eclecticism, Druidry sits on the latter end. Various Druidic groups also display influences from New Age movements and neo-shamanism. The Druidic community has been characterised as a neo-tribe, for it is disembedded and its membership is elective. Druidry has been described as a form of Celtic spirituality, or "Celtic-Based Spirituality". Scholar of religion Marion Bowman described Druidry as the "Celtic spirituality" par excellence. Some practitioners regard Druidry as a form of "native spirituality", and it displays an affinity with folk religions.

In defining Druidry as a "native spirituality", some Druids seek to draw elements from other native religions, such as the belief systems of Australian Aboriginal and Native American communities. Practitioners differ in the levels of formality and seriousness that they bring to their adherence. Some groups use the word Druid for both male and female practitioners, eschewing the term Druidess for female followers.

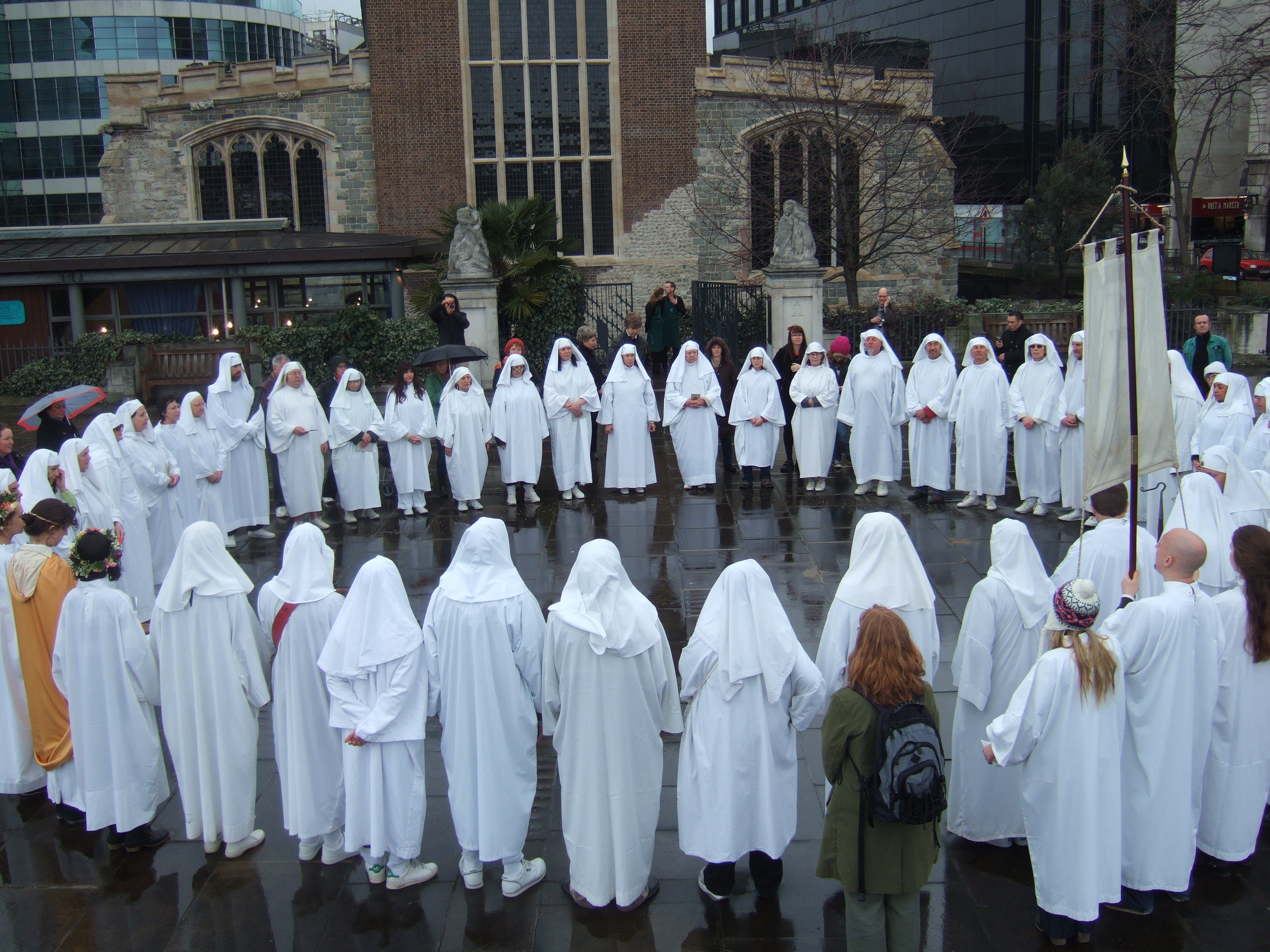
The Druid Order Ceremony at Tower Hill, London on the Spring Equinox of 2010

Following terms devised by the Druid Philip Carr-Gomm, a distinction has been drawn between "cultural" Druids, who adopt the term as part of their Welsh and Cornish cultural activities, and "esoteric" Druids who pursue the movement as a religion. The scholar of religion Marion Bowman suggested "believing" as an alternative term to "esoteric". There are also individuals who cross these two categories, involving themselves in cultural Druidic events while also holding to modern Pagan beliefs. Some cultural Druids nevertheless go to efforts to disassociate themselves from their esoteric and Pagan counterpart; the Cornish Gorsedd, for example, has publicly disassociated any links to Paganism.

Some Druids identify as Pagan, others as Christian. Some practitioners merge Pagan and Christian elements in their own personal practice, in at least one case identifying as a "Christodruid". Other practitioners adopt additional elements; for instance there are self-described "Zen Druids" and "Hasidic Druids". The Berengaria Order of Druids drew upon elements from science fiction television shows like Star Trek and Babylon 5.

The earliest modern Druids aligned themselves with Christianity. The writer William Stukeley regarded the Iron Age druids as monotheist proto-Christians who worshipped the Christian god. In a similar vein, some modern Druids believe that ancient Druidic wisdom was preserved through a distinct Celtic Christianity. Over the course of the twentieth century, and particularly since the early 1960s, Druidry increasingly came to be associated with the modern pagan movement.

== Beliefs ==
The Awen symbol of Iolo Morganwg

Druidic beliefs vary widely, and there is no set dogma or belief system followed by all adherents.

Druid perceptions of the divine tend to be complex and subject to change as the individual Druid learns and grows. Most Druids identify with more than one theological category: 64% of Druids identify as animists; 49% of Druids identify as soft polytheists, 37% of Druids identify as pantheists, 15% of Druids identify as hard polytheists, 7% of Druids identify as monotheists; 7% are agnostic; and 2% identify as atheists.

Druidry is the sole religious or spiritual path for 54% of world Druids; the other 46% practice Druidry concurrently with one or more other religions traditions. The most common, concurrently practiced religious traditions reported among Druids were Buddhism, Christianity, shamanistic traditions, witchcraft/Wicca, northern traditions, Hinduism, Native American religions, and Unitarian Universalism. Roughly 63% of world Druids identify as either Pagan or Heathen in addition to identifying as Druids; 37% of Druids reject both of these labels.

Some Druids draw upon the legends surrounding King Arthur. One of the clearest links between Arthuriana and Druidry is through the Loyal Arthurian Warband, a Druidic group in Britain that employs Arthurian symbolism as part of its environmental campaigns.

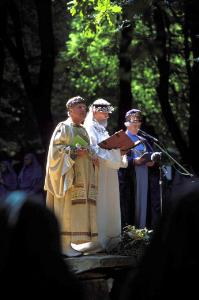
Grand Druid of Brittany Gwenc'hlan Le Scouëzec stands at the centre, surrounded by the Archdruid of Wales and the Grand Bard of Cornwall, at the celebration of the hundredth anniversary of the Goursez Vreizh in Hanvec in 1999.

=== Nature-centered spirituality ===
Neo-Druidry has been described as a nature-venerating movement. Neo-druids conceive of the natural world as being imbued with spirit, and thus regard it as being alive and dynamic. Some 89% of world Druids practice nature-connection, along with some form of environmental stewardship work. Nature-connection involves spending time alone in nature, while maintaining a full sensory and spiritual awareness of whatever or whoever may be nearby. Environmental stewardship work extends this connection through acts of reciprocity.

Druids regularly participate in activities such as restoring native ecosystems, creating wildlife habitats, growing organic food crops, composting, installing solar or wind power systems, and changing personal consumption habits to protect the natural environment from damage. Many Druids are also involved in environmental activism, acting to protect areas of the natural landscape that are under threat from development or pollution.

Druids are generally critical of mainstream society, regarding it as being "governed by consumerism, environmental exploitation, and the supremacy of technology". In contrast to this, Druids seek to establish a way of living that they regard as being more "natural". Through seeking a connection with nature, neo-Druids pursue a sense of "cosmic belonging".

=== Theology ===
"Grant, O God, Thy protection;
And in protection, strength;
And in strength, understanding;
And in understanding, knowledge;
And in knowledge, the knowledge of justice;
And in the knowledge of justice, the love of it;
And in that love, the love of all existences;
And in the love of all existences, the love of God.
God and all goodness."

— Iolo Morganwg, The Gorsedd Prayer.

By the end of the 19th century, Druidry was described as a "monotheistic philosophical tradition". Druidry is now often described as polytheistic, although there is no set pantheon of deities to which all Druids adhere. Emphasis is placed upon the idea that these deities predate Christianity. These deities are usually regarded as being immanent rather than transcendent. Some practitioners say that the real existence of these deities is less important to them than the impact that the belief therein has upon their lives.

A central prayer in modern Druidic traditions is the Druid's Prayer, which was authored in the 18th century by Druid Iolo Morganwg and originally addressed to a monotheistic god. In modern times, with the increase in polytheistic Druidry, and the widespread acceptance of goddess-worship, the word "Goddess" has largely replaced the word "God" in the Druid's Prayer; other variants include "God and Goddess" and "Spirit".

Some Druids regard it as possible to communicate with various spirits during rituals. For example, certain Druids in Ireland have adopted belief in the Sí, which are spirits from Irish folklore, into their Druidic system, and they believe that those spirits are elementals. Those druids have adopted the folkloric belief that such spirits are repelled by iron, and thus they avoid bringing iron to their rituals, so as not to scare those spirits away.

==== Awen ====
Awen is a concept of spirit or divinity in Druidry that inspires poetry and art and is believed to be a "flowing spirit" given by the deity, which can be invoked by the Druid. In many Druidic rituals, Awen is invoked by either chanting the word "Awen" or "A-I-O" three times, in order to shift the consciousness of the participants involved. The word "Awen" derives from the Welsh and Cornish terms for "inspiration".

=== Ancestor veneration ===
A connection with ancestors is important in Druidry. In some recorded examples, Druids regard the "ancestors" as an amorphous group, rather than as a set of named individuals. The Druidic concept of ancestry is that of "ancestors of the land", rather than the "ancestors of the blood" venerated by some Heathen groups; they perceive a spiritual connection, rather than a genetic one, as being important. Emphasising ancestors gives practitioners a sense of an identity which has been passed down from the past over the course of many centuries.

Ancestor-veneration leads many neo-druids to object to the archaeological excavation of human remains and their subsequent display in museums. Many neo-druids have organized campaigns for their reburial. For example, in 2006, a neo-Druid called Paul Davies requested that the Alexander Keiller Museum in Avebury, Wiltshire, rebury their human remains, and he said that storing and displaying those human remains was "immoral and disrespectful". Criticism of such demands has come from the archaeological community, with statements like "no single modern ethnic group or cult should be allowed to appropriate our ancestors for their own agendas. It is for the international scientific community to curate such remains."

== Rites and practices ==
The World Druidry Survey of 2018–2020 identified 147 active Druid groups internationally. The six largest and most influential of which were the Order of Bards, Ovates and Druids (including 57% of world Druids), Ár nDraíocht Féin (12%), the Ancient Order of Druids in America (8%), the British Druid Order (6%), The Druid Network (4%), the New Order of Druids (2%), each of which offers either Druidry curriculum materials or online reference materials about how to practice contemporary Druidry. Survey results indicated that 25% of world Druids belong to multiple Druid groups; 57% belong to just one group, and 18% are unaffiliated, solitary practitioners. Despite these Druid group affiliations, 92% of world Druids report that most of their devotional practices and rituals are celebrated alone, as solitary practitioners.

Druidic groups are usually known as groves. Such a term reflects the movement's association with trees, and references the idea that Iron Age druids performed their rituals within tree groves. Larger Druidic organisations are usually termed orders, and those that lead them are often referred to as Chosen Chief or Archdruid.

Some British Druid orders divide membership into three grades, referred to as "bards", "ovates", and then "Druids". This three-tier system mirrors the three degrees found in British Traditional Wicca. Other groups eschew any division into bard, ovate, and druid. OBOD primarily educates its members in its form of Druidry through a correspondence course.

=== Ceremonies ===
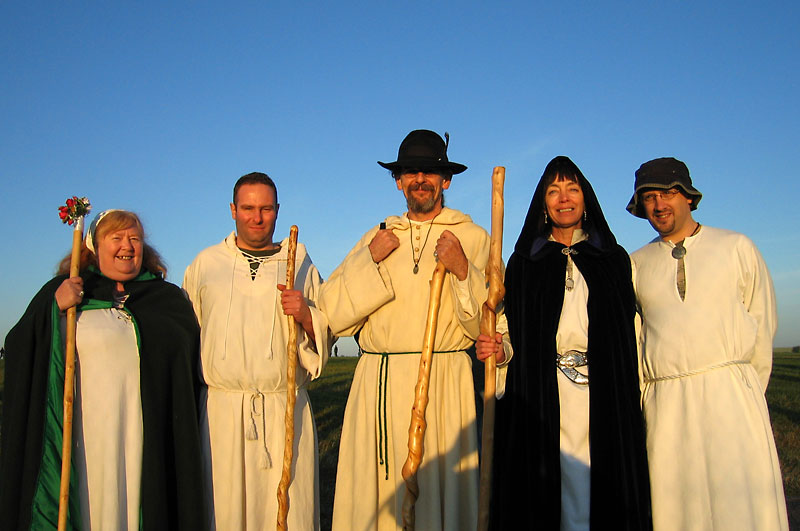
A group of druids of the Order of Bards Ovates and Druids in the early morning glow of the sun, shortly after having welcomed the sunrise at Stonehenge on the morning of the summer solstice

Every solitary Druid and Druidic grove conducts its rituals and ceremonies in a unique way. Druidic rituals are designed to align their participants with the spirit imbuing nature. According to the anthropologist Thorsten Gieser, Druidic rituals are best seen not as a set of formalised actions but as "a stance, an attitude, a particular mode of experience and perception which gives rise to a feeling of being-in-the-world, of being part of Nature." The practices of modern Druids typically take place outside, in the daylight, in what is described as "the eye of the sun", meaning around midday. In some cases, they instead perform their rites indoors, or during the night. Druidic rituals usually reflect on the time of year and the changing of the seasons.

The most common form of ritual used for seasonal celebrations is a solitary nature ramble to observe and connect with nature, combined with a personal meditation on the meaning of the season at hand. When larger, group rituals are organized among Druids, the rituals tend to be more elaborate and formally structured, with a fixed ceremonial framework unique to the Druid group, and a central ritual activity that varies with the season. Druids residing in the traditionally Celtic regions of Europe are significantly more likely than Druids residing in other parts of the world to perform their ceremonies and rituals in groups.

"We swear, by peace and love to stand
Heart to heart and hand in hand
Mark O Spirit, and hear us now;
Confirming this, our sacred vow."

— The Druid's Vow

In the British Isles, Druid group rituals often involve the participants standing in a circle and begin with a "calling of the quarters", in which a participant draws a circle in the air in a deosil direction to hail the north, south, east, and west, marking out the space in which the ceremony will take place. Libations may be poured onto the ground while a chalice of drink is passed around the assembled participants, again in a deosil direction. Food, often in the form of bread or cake, is also passed around the Druids and consumed. This may be followed by a period of meditation among those assembled. A form of earth energy is then visualised, with participants believing that it is sent for a designated healing purpose. This may be designed to help the victims of a particular event, such as a war or an epidemic, or it might be directed to assist individuals known to the group who are ill or requiring emotional support. After the end of the ceremony, the Druids may remain together to take part in a meal, or visit a nearby pub.

Deep within the still centre of my being, may I find peace. Silently within the quiet of the grove, may I share peace. Gently within the greater circle of humankind, may I radiate peace.

— The Druid's Prayer for Peace

There is no specific dress code for ritual within the Druidic movement; some participants wear ordinary clothes, others wear robes. Some groups favour earth-coloured robes, believing that this links them to the natural world and that it aids them in traveling unnoticed when going about at night. Celtic languages are often employed during ceremonies, as are quotations and material from the Carmina Gadelica. Most use some form of Morganwg's Gorsedd Prayer, as well as the Druid's Vow, created by the druid Nuinn.

Some Druids also involve themselves in spell-casting, although this is usually regarded as a secondary feature among their practices.

==== Locations for ritual ====
The two most common locations for Druid rituals are indoors, at home, at a home altar or shrine (92% of Druids), or outdoors in a private garden or wild space (90% of Druids). Only 48% of world Druids regularly participate in rituals held in publicly viewable spaces, and 18% attend rituals at public monuments or popular tourist destinations such as Stonehenge or Avebury, however, Druids in the British Isles are significantly more likely to do so.

Public rituals in the British Isles frequently take place at formations in the natural landscape or at prehistoric sites, among them megalithic constructions from the Neolithic and Bronze Age or earthworks from the Iron Age. Druids often believe that, even if the Iron Age druids did not build these monuments, they did use them for their rites. Performing rituals at said sites allows many Druids to feel that they are getting close to their ancestors. Druids regard them as sacred sites in part as recognition that prehistoric societies would have done the same. Druids in various parts of Ireland and Britain have reported such sites being home to a "Spirit of the Place" residing there. Many Druids also believe that such sites are centres of earth energy and lie along ley lines in the landscape. These are ideas that have been adopted from Earth mysteries writers like John Michell.

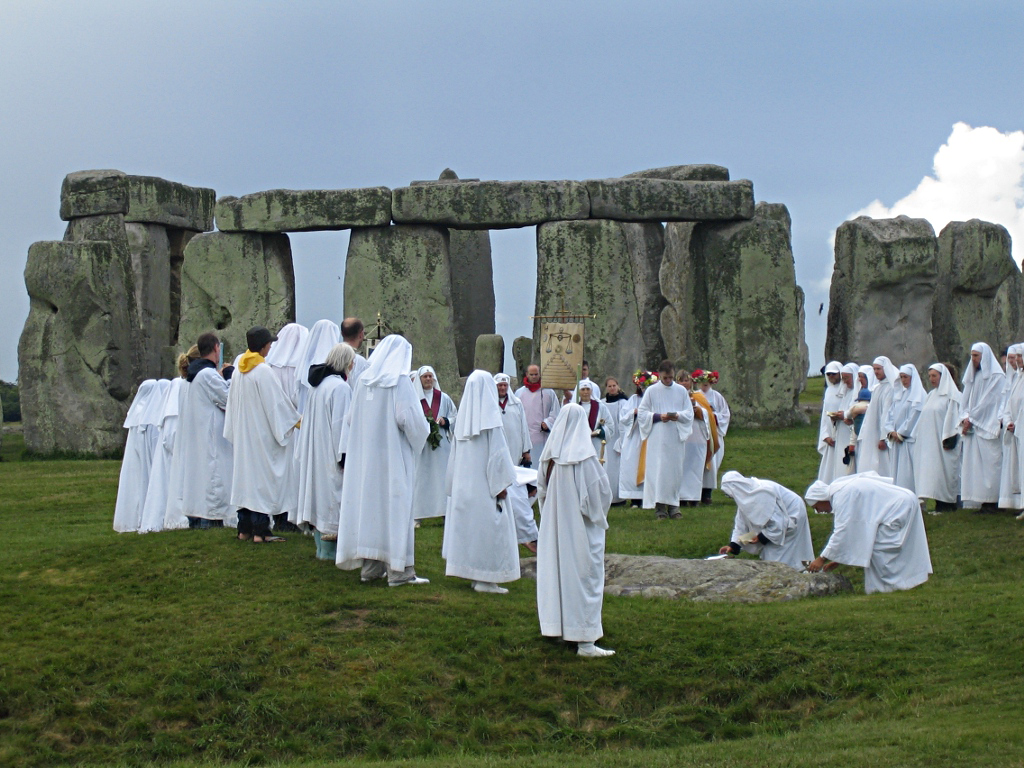
Druidic ritual at Stonehenge in Wiltshire, southern England

In the popular imagination, Druids are closely linked with Stonehenge—a Neolithic and Bronze Age site in Wiltshire, southern England. Although Stonehenge predates the Iron Age and there is no evidence that it was ever used by Iron Age druids, many modern Druids believe that their ancient namesakes did indeed use it for their ceremonies. Druids also use many other prehistoric sites as spaces for their rituals, including stone circles like that at Avebury in Wiltshire. Some Druids have erected their own, modern stone circles in which to perform their ceremonies. Druidic practices have also taken place at Early Neolithic chambered long barrows such as Wayland's Smithy in Oxfordshire, and the Coldrum Long Barrow in Kent. In Ireland, Druids perform ceremonies at one of the island's best known prehistoric sites, the Hill of Tara. In 2000, scholar of religion Amy Hale noted that Druidic rituals at such prehistoric sites were "increasingly more common". She regarded the stone circle as "a symbol of an imagined Celtic past" shared by both Druids and Gorseth Bards. As well as performing group rituals at sites, Druids also visit them alone to meditate, pray, and provide offerings. Aside from seasonal celebrations, rites of passage can also take place at such sites, such as a Druidic baby-naming ceremony which took place at Kent's Chestnuts Long Barrow.

Attitudes to land and environmental conservation are important to the Druidic world-view. In 2003, Druids performed a ritual at the Hill of Tara to heal the location after road construction took place in the adjacent landscape. Others have carried out rituals at Coldrum Long Barrow to oppose fracking in the landscape. Druids have also involved themselves in tree planting projects.

In the 1990s and early 2000s, the use of a ritual based on the sweat lodge became increasingly popular among some Neo-druids in Ireland and the U.K. Some Druids regard these sweat lodges as "initiatory and regenerative opportunities to rededicate oneself to honouring the Earth and the community of life." This practice is regarded differently by different individuals. Some practitioners regard it as a "revival" of genuine pre-Christian druidic practices, others see it a creative and respectful borrowing from one "native spirituality" into another, and a third school of thought regards it as a form of cultural theft. Native Americans who preserve the sweat lodge ceremonies for their communities have protested the appropriation of the ceremony by non-Natives.

=== Arts and poetry ===
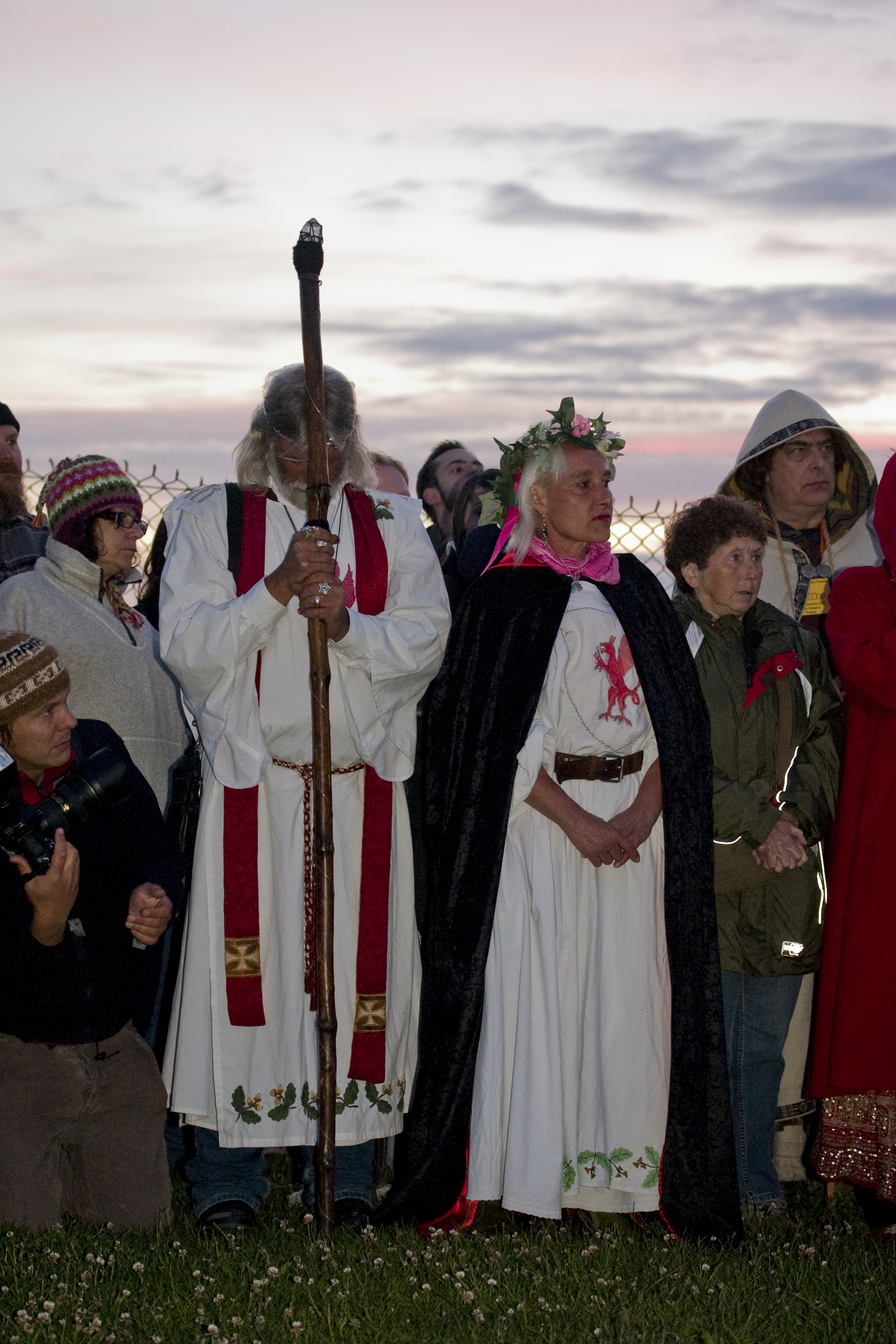
Arthur Uther Pendragon attending 2010 Summer Solstice ceremony at Stonehenge

In Druidry, a specific ceremony takes place known as an Eisteddfod, which is dedicated to the recitation of poetry and musical performances. Within the Druidic community, practitioners who are particularly skilled in their recitation of poetry or their performance of music are referred to as Bards. Although bardism can also be found in other Pagan traditions such as Eco-Paganism, it is of particular importance within Druidry. Bards perform at Eisteddfod at various occasions, from formal rituals to pub get-togethers and summer camps and environmental protests. Among the Druidic community, it is often believed that bards should be divinely inspired in producing their work.

Storytelling is important within Druidry, with stories often following themes from the literary traditions of Celtic nations and Arthurian legend. Musical performances typically draw from the folk traditions of Ireland, Scotland, England, France, and Brittany.

Groups like the British Druid Order have established their own gorseddau. Unlike the Welsh cultural gorseddau, these Druidic events often allow anyone to perform as a bard if they are inspired to do so.

Druids have participated in other musical genres and with more technological instruments, including the blues and rave music, and one British club, Megatripolis, opened with the performance of a Druidic ritual.

=== Other practices ===
Among many Druids, there is a system of tree lore, through which different associations are attributed to different species of tree, including particular moods, actions, phases of life, deities and ancestors. Different species of trees are often linked to the ogham alphabet, which is employed in divination by Druids. Rather than ogham, some practitioners favour coelbren—an alphabet likely devised by Iolo Morganwg—for their divinatory practices.

Many Druids engage in a range of healing therapies, with both herbalism and homeopathy being popular within the Druidic community.

Druids often revive older folk customs for use on their practices. The England-based Secular Order of Druids for instance possess a hobby horse based on that used in the 'Obby 'Oss festival of Padstow, Cornwall.

=== Festivals ===
Traditionally, modern Druids have observed eight spiritual festivals annually, which are collectively known as the Wheel of the Year. These are the same festivals usually celebrated by Wiccans. According to the results of the World Druidry Survey of 2018–2020, 47% of world Druids currently celebrate all eight of these festivals in the traditional manner; 26% celebrate only a locally meaningful subset of them; and 27% do not celebrate any festivals at all, but focus instead on daily or weekly devotional practices and nature connection. 76% of Druids use the Wheel of the Year as a cyclical reminder to go outside to observe and connect with the natural world. As a result, 52% of world Druids report "wildcrafting" their seasonal celebrations to some extent, modifying the timing, sequence, and/or symbolism of their seasonal celebrations as needed to align with local seasonal cycles and ecologies.

In some cases groups attempt to revive folkloric European festivals and their accompanying traditions. In other cases the rites are modern inventions, inspired by "the spirit of what they believe was the religious practice of pre-Roman Britain." For reasons of practicality, such celebrations are not always held on the specific date of the festival itself, but on the nearest weekend, thus maximising the number of participants who can attend.

Four of these are solar festivals, being positioned at the solstices and equinoxes. The other four are the cross-quarter days. The idea of the Wheel of the Year was developed by Ross Nichols, who founded the Order of Bards, Ovates and Druids in 1964, and Gerald Gardner, leader of the Bricket Wood coven.

Festival	Northern hemisphere	Southern hemisphere	Associations
Samhain, Calan Gaeaf	31 October or 1 November	30 April or 1 May	Final harvest, transition to shorter days
Winter Solstice, Alban Arthan	21 or 22 December	21 or 22 June	Longest night and shortest day, rebirth of the sun
Imbolc	1 or 2 February	1 or 2 August	Thaw from cold to spring
Spring equinox, Alban Eilir	20 or 21 March	21 or 22 September	Height of spring season
Beltaine, Calan Mai	30 April or 1 May	31 October or 1 November	Planting crops, warming days
Summer Solstice, Alban Hefin	21 or 22 June	21 or 22 December	Longest day and shortest night
Lughnasadh	1 or 2 August	1 or 2 February	Start of harvest season
Autumn equinox, Alban Elfed	21 or 22 September	20 or 21 March	Height of harvest season

== History ==
=== Origins ===
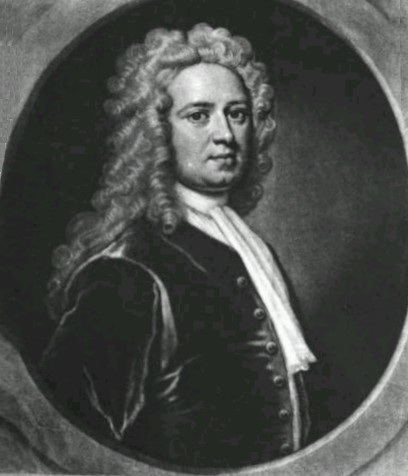
An illustration of William Stukeley. One of the primary figures in the development of Druidry, he was also a significant influence on modern archaeology.

The Druidic movement originated among the Romanticist ideas of the ancient druids that had begun to be developed in the 17th and 18th centuries. While many Early Mediaeval writers, particularly in Ireland, had demonised the ancient druids as barbarians who had practiced human sacrifice and tried to suppress the coming of Christianity, certain Late Mediaeval writers had begun to extol what they believed were the virtues of the druids, and reinvented them as national heroes, particularly in Germany, France and Scotland. It was also during this period that Conrad Celtis had begun to propagate the image of the druids as having been bearded, wise old men wearing white robes, something that would prove highly influential in future centuries.

The image of the Iron Age druids as national heroes would later begin to emerge in England during the Early Modern period, with the antiquarian and Anglican vicar William Stukeley (1687–1765) proclaiming himself to be a "druid" and writing a number of popular books in which he claimed that prehistoric megaliths like Stonehenge and Avebury were temples built by the druids, something now known to be incorrect. Stukeley himself, being a devout but unorthodox Christian, felt that the ancient druids had been followers of a monotheistic faith very similar to Christianity, at one point even stating that ancient druidry was "so extremely like Christianity, that in effect, it differed from it only in this; they believe in a Messiah who was to come into the world, as we believe in him that is come".

Soon after the publication and spread of Stukeley's writings, other people also began to self-describe themselves as "druids" and form societies: the earliest of these was the Druidic Society, founded on the Welsh island of Anglesey in 1772. Largely revolving around ensuring the continued financial success of business on the island, it attracted many of Anglesey's wealthy inhabitants into it, and donated much of its proceeds to charity, but was disbanded in 1844. A similar Welsh group was the Society of the Druids of Cardigan, founded circa 1779, largely by a group of friends who wished to attend "literary picnics" together. The third British group to call itself Druidic was English rather than Welsh, and was known as the Ancient Order of Druids. Founded in 1781 and influenced by Freemasonry, its origins have remained somewhat unknown, but it subsequently spread in popularity from its base in London across much of Britain and even abroad, with new lodges being founded, all of which were under the control of the central Grand Lodge in London. The Order was not religious in structure, and instead acted as somewhat of a social club, particularly for men with a common interest in music. In 1833 it suffered a schism, as a large number of dissenting lodges, unhappy at the management of the Order, formed the United Ancient Order of Druids, and both groups would go on to grow in popularity throughout the rest of the century.

=== Development of religious structure ===
None of the earliest modern Druidic groups had been religious in structure; however, this was to change in the late 18th century, primarily because of the work of a Welshman who took the name of Iolo Morganwg (1747–1826). Born as Edward Williams, he would take up the cause of Welsh nationalism, and was deeply opposed to the British monarchy, supporting many of the ideals of the French Revolution, which had occurred in 1789. Eventually moving to London, he began perpetuating the unproved claim that he was actually one of the last initiates of a surviving group of druids who were descended from those found in the Iron Age, centred on his home county of Glamorgan. He subsequently organised the performing of Neo-druidic rituals on Primrose Hill with some of his followers, whom he categorised as either Bards or Ovates, with he himself being the only one actually categorised as a Druid. He himself practiced a form of religion he believed the ancient druids had, which involved the worship of a singular monotheistic deity as well as the acceptance of reincarnation. In Wales, Druidry had taken on an explicitly religious formation by the 1840s.

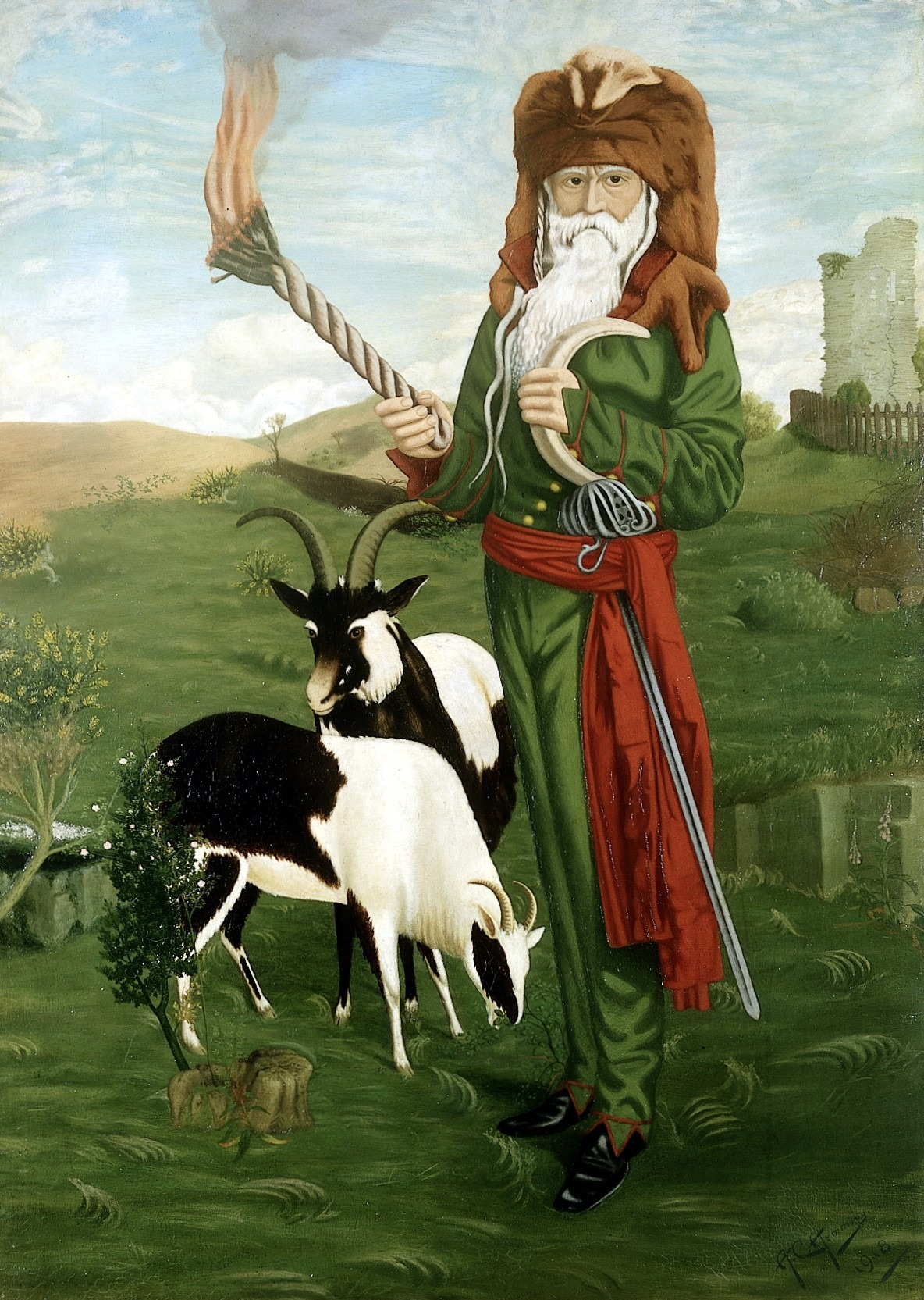
The Welsh socialist and nationalist Dr. William Price, a prominent modern Druid

Morganwg's example was taken up by other Welshmen in the 19th century, who continued to promote religious forms of Druidry. The most prominent figure in this was William Price (1800–1893), a physician who held to ideas such as vegetarianism and the political Chartist movement. His promotion of cremation and open practice of it led to his arrest and trial, but he was acquitted, achieving a level of fame throughout Britain. He would declare himself to be a Druid, and would do much to promote the return of what he believed, without any independently verified evidence, was an ancient religion in his country.

In 1874, Robert Wentworth Little, a Freemason who achieved notoriety as the first Supreme Magus of the occult Societas Rosicruciana, allegedly founded the Ancient and Archaeological Order of Druids, which, like the Societas Rosicruciana, was an esoteric organisation. Meanwhile, at the start of the 20th century, Druidic groups began holding their ceremonies at the great megalithic monument of Stonehenge in Wiltshire, England: the historian Ronald Hutton would later remark that "it was a great, and potentially uncomfortable, irony that modern Druids had arrived at Stonehenge just as archaeologists were evicting the ancient Druids from it" as they realised that the structure dated from the Neolithic and early Bronze Age, millennia before the Iron Age, when the druids first appear in the historical record.

One member of the Ancient Order of Druids was the English Gerald Gardner, who in the 1960s invented Wicca.

=== In Britain ===
The most important figure for the rise of Neopagan Druidry in Britain was Ross Nichols. A member of The Druid Order, in 1964 he split off to found the Order of Bards, Ovates and Druids (OBOD). In 1988 Philip Carr-Gomm was asked to lead the Order.

Nichols drew upon ideas from the Earth mysteries movement, incorporating many of its ideas about Glastonbury into his interpretation of Druidry.

Between 1985 and 1988, the Druid Tim Sebastion campaigned for religious access to Stonehenge, forming the Secular Order of Druids (SOD) around him. In the late 1980s, SOD's campaign was joined by another group focused on Stonehenge access, led by a Druid calling himself King Arthur Pendragon; by 1993, his group had formalised as the Loyal Arthurian Warband. In 1988, a Druid order was also established in Glastonbury, Somerset, under the leadership of Rollo Maughfling.

In the late 1970s, the former Alexandrian Wiccan high priest Philip Shallcrass established the British Druid Order (BDO) to create a more explicitly Pagan form of Druidry. Fellow Druid Emma Restall Orr became co-leader of the group in the mid-1990s. Feeling the system of Orders too limiting, in 2002 Orr created The Druid Network, which was officially launched in 2003.

The early 1990s were—according to the historian Ronald Hutton—"boom years" for British Druidry. In 1989, the Council of British Druid Orders was established to co-ordinate the activities of different Druid groups at the national level. Further reflecting this spirit of unity, in 1992 a rite took place on London's Primrose Hill in which various Druid orders participated. That year, two new Druidic magazines began publication Shallcrass' Druid's Voice and Steve Wilson's Aisling. However, arguments between different groups persisted and in 1996, the AOD, (Note: At that time, the AOD experienced a period of troubles as the Order since 1781 prohibited any discussion on religion or politics. Because of that, and in order to preserve its heritage and traditions, it quickly retired from the council.) OBOD, and BDO withdrew from the Council of British Druid Orders. In the late 1990s, English Heritage relented to pressure and agreed to allow Druidic and greater public access to Stonehenge. During the 1990s, Pagan Druidic groups were also established in Italy, with British Druids like Carr-Gomm visiting the country to give talks to the Pagan community.

The Anglesey Druid Order, founded in Wales 1999, centers Welsh mythology and the Welsh language.

=== In North America ===
The earliest American Druid organizations were fraternal orders such as the United Ancient Order of Druids and the American Order of Druids. The former was a branch of a British organization that had split from the Ancient Order of Druids, while the latter was founded in Massachusetts in 1888. Both were forms of fraternal benefit societies rather than religious or neo-pagan groups.

In 1963, the Reformed Druids of North America (RDNA) was founded by students at Carleton College, Northfield, Minnesota, a liberal arts college that required its members to attend their choice of weekly religious services. As a form of humorous protest against this rule, a group of students, who contained Christians, Jews and agnostics within their ranks, decided to create their own, non-serious religious group. Their protest was successful, and the college's requirement was scrapped in 1964. Nonetheless, the group continued holding services. These were not considered Neopagan by most members, but rather as inter-religious. From its beginning, the RDNA encouraged the veneration of the natural world, personified as Mother Earth, holding that religious truth could be found through nature. They also adopted other elements of Neopaganism, such as celebrating the festivals of the Wheel of the Year, borrowed from the Neopagan religion of Wicca.

While the RDNA founded new branches or "groves" around the United States, the Neopagan elements of the RDNA eventually rose to prominence, leading several groves to describe themselves as Neopagan. This was opposed by several of the group's founders, who wanted it to retain its inter-religious origins, and some groves actually emphasized their connection to other religions: there was a group of Zen Druids in Olympia and Hassidic Druids in St. Louis. Among those responsible for the transition towards Neopaganism were Isaac Bonewits and Robert Larson from a grove located in Berkeley, California. Believing that the Reformed Druidic movement should accept that it was essentially Neopagan in nature, Bonewits founded a split-off group, the New Reformed Druids of North America (NRDNA), which he defined as an "Eclectic Reconstructionist Neo-Pagan Priestcraft, based primarily upon Gaulish and Celtic sources".

Bonewits still felt that many in the RDNA were hostile towards him, believing that he had infiltrated their group, and so in 1985 he founded a new, explicitly Neopagan Druidic group, Ár nDraíocht Féin (Our Own Druidism; a.k.a. ADF) and began publishing a journal, The Druid's Progress. Arguing that it should draw from pan-European sources, rather than just those that were considered "Celtic", he placed an emphasis on academic and scholarly accuracy, taking a stand against what he perceived as the prevalent pseudo-historical ideas of many Neopagans and Druids.

In 1986, several members of Ár nDraíocht Féin openly criticized Bonewits for his pan-European approach, wishing modern Druidism to be inspired purely by Celtic sources, and so they splintered off to form a group called the Henge of Keltria.

The Ancient Order of Druids in America (AODA), currently headed by Pagan author and druid John Michael Greer, was founded as the Ancient Order of Masonic Druids in America in 1912 in Boston, Mass. The founder, James Manchester had obtained a charter from the Ancient Order of Masonic Druids of England (AOMD). AOMD started in 1874 as the Ancient Archaeological Order of Druids (AAOD) by Robert Wentworth Little, the founder of Societas Rosicruciana in Anglia (SRIA). SRIA is the immediate predecessor organization of the Hermetic Order of the Golden Dawn (HOGD). In 1972, the Ancient Order of Masonic Druids in America changed its name to the current name the Ancient Order of Druids in America and started initiating women, which it had not done so previously because of its masonic origin. It was also at this time that AOMD denied ever having recognized AOMDA and wasn't interested in doing so at that time.

== Demographics ==
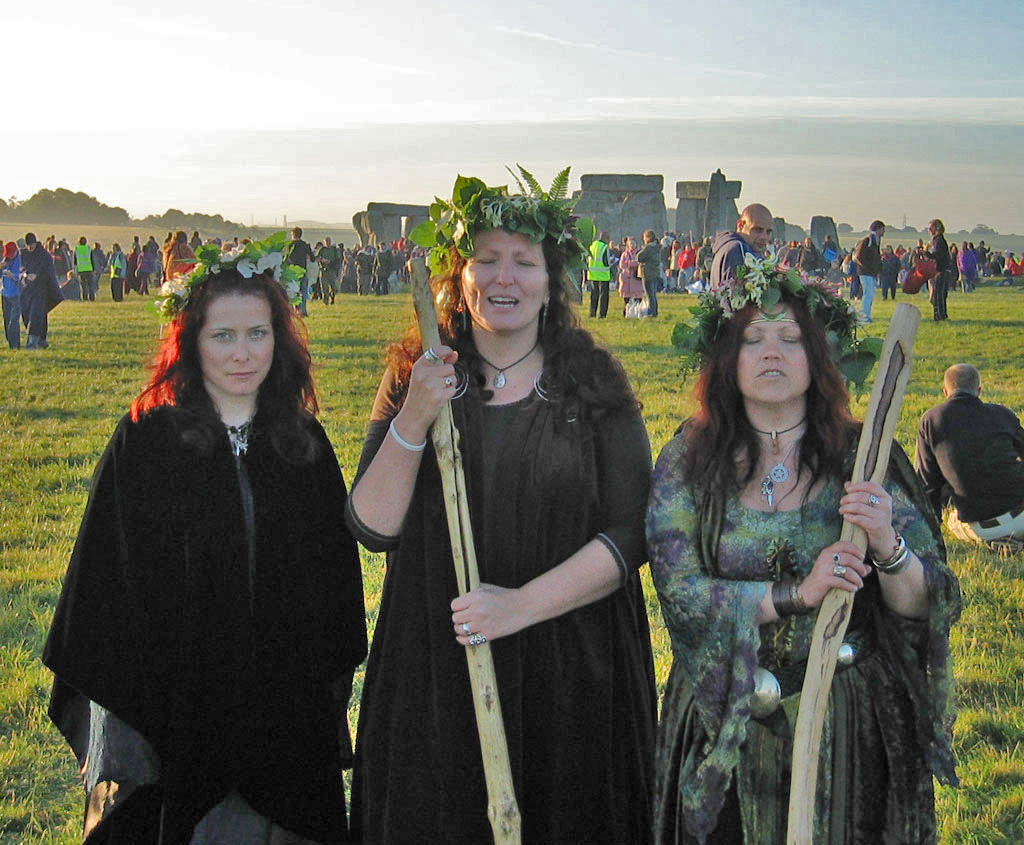
Three druids at Stonehenge on the morning of summer solstice 2005

At the start of the twenty-first century, Druids could be found in most European countries and countries with large European-descended communities. Druids do not seek to convert everyone else to Druidry.

According to the American Religious Identification Survey (ARIS), there are approximately 30,000 Druids in the United States. In August 2007, the ADF claimed 1177 members, spread over 61 groves. Scholar of religion Michael T. Cooper found that, among 57 ADF members, 37% had previously been Christian, and that a common theme among participants in the group was disillusionment with Christianity, a religion that they regard as an oppressive force which has subordinated women and damaged the environment.

The Pagan Census project led by Helen A. Berger, Evan A. Leach, and Leigh S. Shaffer gained responses from Druids in the U.S. Of these respondents, 49.7% were male and 48.2% female (2% did not answer), which reflected a greater proportion of men than the American Pagan community as a whole, which had a female majority. 73.6% of Druid respondents described themselves as heterosexual, with 16.2% as bisexual, 3% as gay men and 1.5% as lesbian. This reflected a greater proportion of heterosexuals than in the broader American Pagan community. The median income of these Druids was between $20,000 and $30,000, which was lower than the average for Pagans. The project revealed that 83.8% of Druid respondents were registered to vote, which was lower than the proportion across the broader Pagan community (87.8%). Among these Druids, 35.5% were registered independents, 31% Democrats, 5.1% Libertarians, 4.6% Republicans, and 3.6% Greens.

The historian Ronald Hutton estimated that, in 1996, there were approximately 6000 members of Druid groups in England, two-thirds of whom were OBOD members. The 2001 UK Census, 30,569 individuals described themselves as "Druids" and 508 as "Celtic Druids". In September 2010, the Charity Commission for England and Wales agreed to register The Druid Network as a charity, effectively giving it official recognition as a religion. A study of 75 members of the UK-based Order of Bards, Ovates and Druids found "a clear preference for introversion (61%) over extraversion (39%), a clear preference for intuition (64%) over sensing (36%), a clear preference for feeling (56%) over thinking (44%), and a clear preference for judging (68%) over perceiving (32%)."

Based on 2011–2013 census data from Britain, Canada, Australia, New Zealand, and Ireland, and 2008 ARIS Report data from the United States, the population of Druids residing in anglophone nations was estimated at 59,299. The current global population of Druids is likely to significantly exceed this number, as many countries with resident Druids do not allow for the existence of Druidry within their census instruments. Pagan faith surveys are also likely to undercount Druids, as only 63% of world Druids identify with either of the categories Pagan or Heathen. In addition, 74% of world Druids report having significant privacy and safety concerns, due to discrimination and persecution within their local communities, and so are likely to be underreported in the census data that does exist.

== See also ==
- Celtic neopaganism
- List of druids and neo-druids
