= The Druid Order =

Religious organisation

The Druid Order An Druidh Uileach Braithreachas
- Abbreviation: ADUB
- Formation: 1909
- Founder: George Watson MacGregor Reid
- Type: Modern Druidry; Esotericism
- Headquarters: United Kingdom
- Leader: David Loxley
- Website: thedruidorder.org

The Druid Order is a contemporary druidry fraternal order, founded in 1909 by George Watson MacGregor Reid in the United Kingdom. At various times it has also been known as The Ancient Druid Order, An Druidh Uileach Braithreachas, and The British Circle of the Universal Bond. Initiated members are called companions.

== Activity ==
Meditation is a key activity. Druidic discussions typically cover personal experience as well as philosophical, biological, mythological, political, poetic, astrological, religious, and similar subjects. Direct experience is more important than learning acquired through books.

== Public Ceremonies ==
For well over a century, The Druid Order has held Public Ceremonies, one at each of the Autumn and Spring Equinoxes, and one at Summer Solstice. Sometimes the location or time varies due to current circumstances.

The first public ceremony of the year, the Autumn Equinox, takes place on Primrose Hill in London.

The second ceremony of the year, the Winter Solstice, passes without a public ceremony.

The third ceremony of the year, the Spring Equinox, is held at Tower Hill in London.

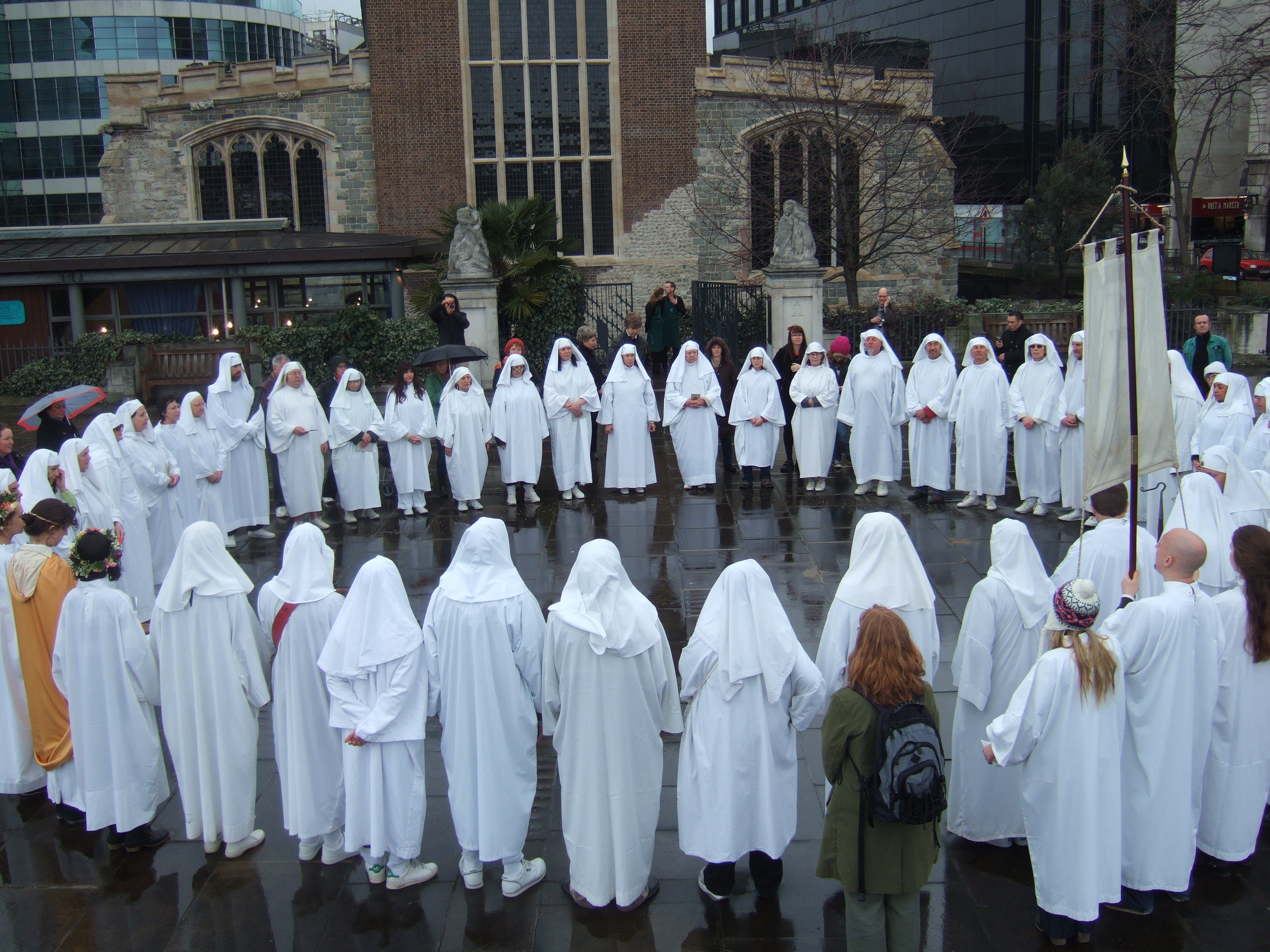
Ceremony at Spring Equinox

The fourth and final public ceremony of the year is the Summer solstice. This event is marked by three ceremonies at Stonehenge in Wiltshire: a simple ceremony at midnight for the darkest hour, a dawn ceremony marking the rising of the Sun behind the Heel Stone, and a ceremony at noon for the fullness of the light. In recent years these ceremonies have taken place on the night and day following the 'open access' to Stonehenge on Summer Solstice itself.

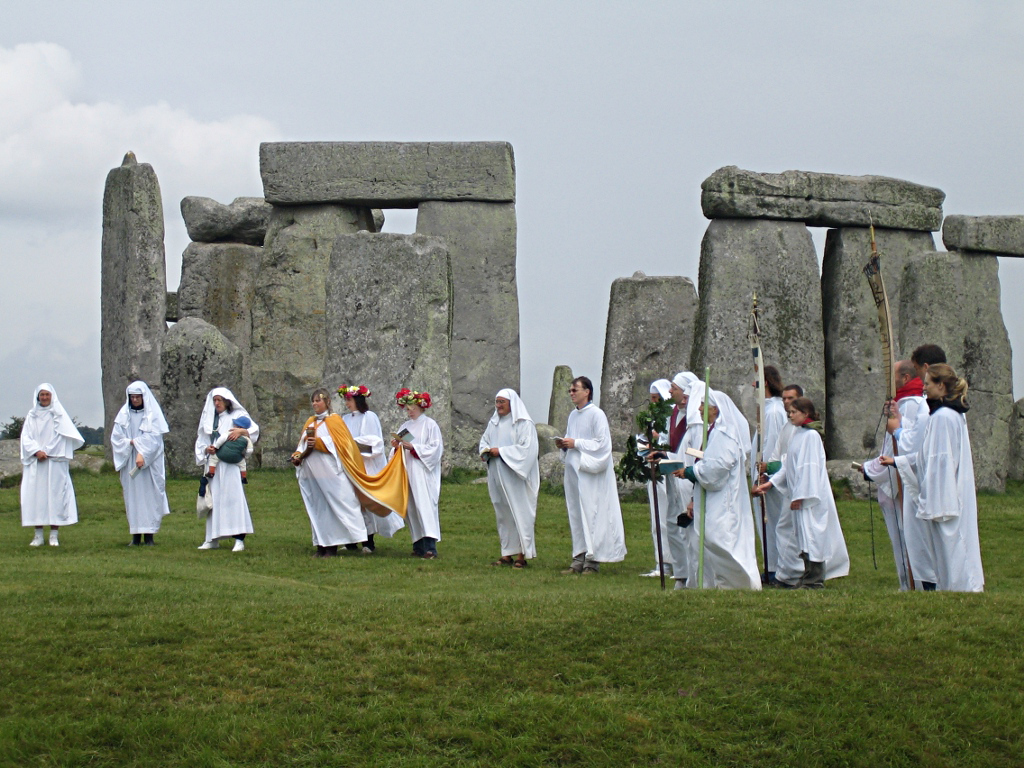
Druids at Stonehenge

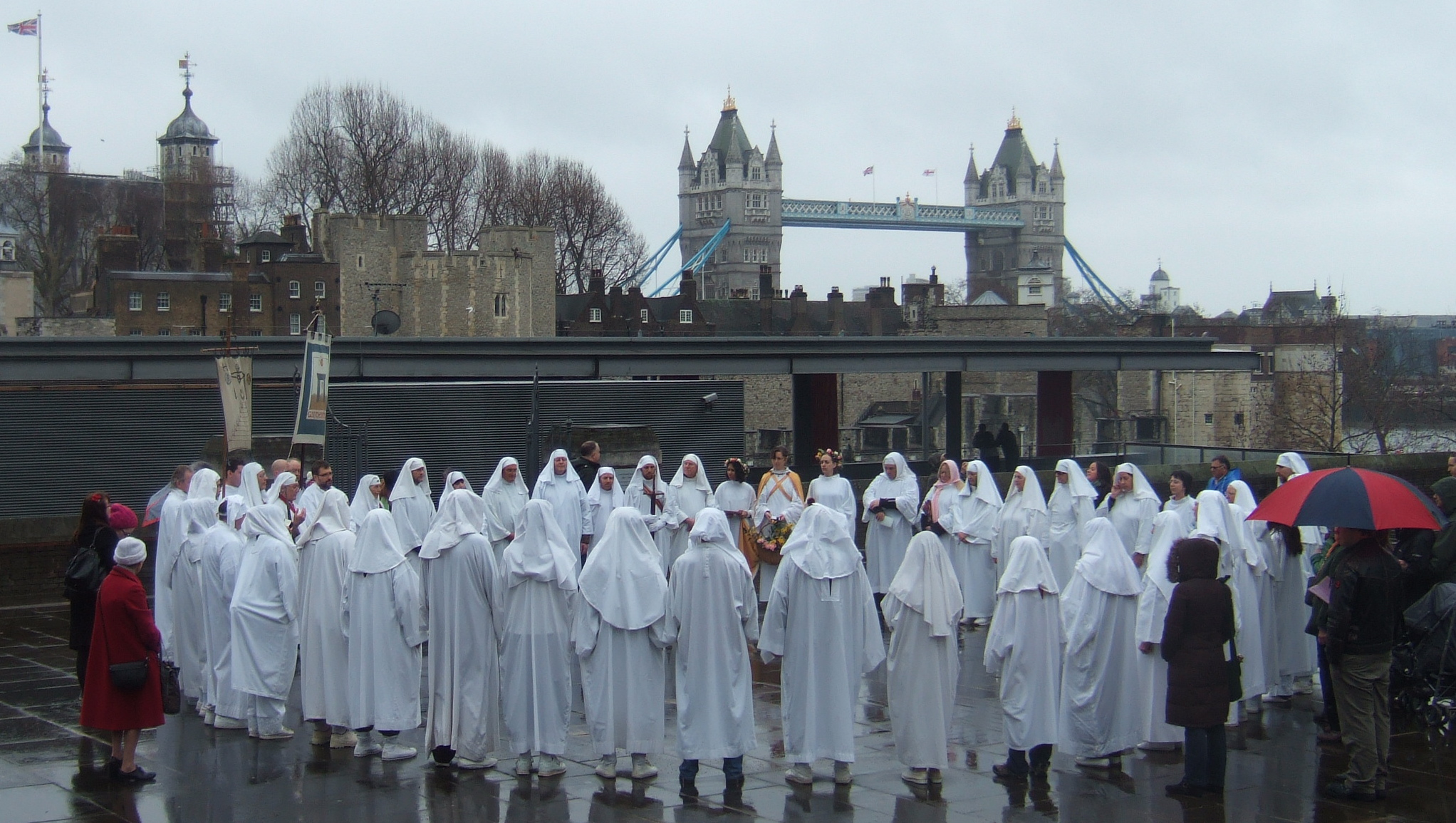
Druids at Tower Hill

The public ceremonies above are, obviously, open to all. Companions of the ordered dress in white robes and wear a cowl. They process to the place of the ceremony and form a circle with key positions oriented to the cardinal points and the Sun. Most of the ceremonies feature banners, a sword bearer leading the procession, three ladies bearing items in some way related to the season, the blowing of a horn, the reading of a scroll, representations of the elements Earth, Air, Water and Fire, wine or cider, an invocation to East, West, North and South, and words.

== History ==
Ronald Hutton writes that the Druid Order in its current form started around 1909 or 1912 when George Watson MacGregor Reid (1862–1946) led the group, influenced by universalists. When Thomas Maughan (1901–1976), who practised homeopathy, was elected chief in 1964, some senior members and the Order's Maenarch (chairman) Ross Nichols (1902–1975) left to form the Order of Bards, Ovates and Druids. Nichols wrote that MacGregor Reid told of a history in which John Toland, on the day of the Autumn Equinox 1716 at Primrose Hill, (where began the Welsh Gorsedd of Bards), called for Druids to meet at the Apple Tree Tavern, Covent Garden, London a year and a day later, and that the meeting which formed An Druidh Uileach Braithreachas i.e. The Druid Circle of the Universal Bond took place on 22 September 1717 with representatives from London, York, Oxford, Wales, Cornwall, The Isle of Man, Scotland, Anglesey, Ireland and Brittany. It was also claimed that John Aubrey, the seventeenth-century antiquarian, revitalised the Mount Haemus Grove, founded in Oxford in 1245. The claim of Toland and Aubrey as members of any druid order is thought now to be unlikely from a historical perspective. Hutton suggests any lineage prior to George Watson MacGregor Reid is a legendary aspect of the order's origins.

== Chief Druids ==
- George Watson MacGregor-Reid, 1909–1946
- Robert MacGregor-Reid, 1946–1964
- Thomas Lackenby Maughan, 1964–1976
- Christopher Sullivan, 1976–1981
- David Loxley, 1981–present
