= Marian Green =

British author (born 1944)

Marian Green (born 1944) is a British author who has published about magic, witchcraft and the "Western Mysteries" since the early 1960s.

She founded and continues to organise the Quest Conference held every year in the UK and has edited the magazine Quest since founding it in 1970. She created the Green Circle, a network of pagans and occultists, in 1982. She was previously a council member of the Pagan Federation and the editor of Pagan Dawn.

Born in London in 1944 but raised in a rural area, Green met other pagans after entering university at 29. As of 2002 she had worked in publishing for most of her career.

Green rejects the idea, dominant in the period after the revival of pagan witchcraft by Gerald Gardner, that witchcraft needs to be coven-based and organised around formal initiations conferred by coven leaders. She teaches that the old divinities can be encountered in the natural world, alone and without prescribed ritual forms. She teaches visualisation as a means to self-transformation which will make effecting change possible: "By changing our point of view, by developing our own inner skills, each of us can learn to shape the world into the perfect planet everyone yearns for."

Green runs residential and non-residential weekends and correspondence courses, under the aegis of The Invisible College, which she founded. These activities are advertised in Quest. She is also a frequent speaker at other venues in the UK and the Netherlands. She is the author of over twenty books. Her manuals are widely used in the witchcraft community, and she has been influential in the development of the solitary movement in English witchcraft.

== Select bibliography ==
- Magic in Principle and Practice. Self-published, 1971. Quest, 2010. ISBN 9780902821033.
- The Gentle Arts of Natural Magic: Magical Techniques to Help You Master the Crafts of the Wise. Thoth, 1987. Rev. ed. 1997. ISBN 9781870450430.
- The Path Through the Labyrinth: The Quest for Initiation into the Western Mystery Tradition. Element, 1988. ISBN 9781852300340. Thoth, 1994. ISBN 9781870450157.
- A Witch Alone: Thirteen Moons to Master Natural Magic. Thorsons/Aquarian, 1991, 2002. ISBN 9781855381124.
- A Calendar of Festivals: Traditional Celebrations, Songs, Seasonal Recipes & Things to Make. Element, 1991. ISBN 9781852302047.
- Everyday Magic: Bring the Power of Positive Magic into Your Life. Thorsons, 1995. ISBN 9781855384385.
- Natural Witchcraft: The Timeless Arts and Crafts of the Country Witch. Thorsons, 2001. ISBN 9780007120215.
- The Modern Magician's Handbook. Thoth, 2001. ISBN 9781870450430.
- Practical Magic: A Book of Transformations, Spells & Mind Magic. Lorenz, 2001. ISBN 9780754807445.
- The Book of Spells II: Over 40 Charms and Magic Spells to Increase Your Physical, Mental, and Spiritual Well-Being. Quarto/Barron's, 2001. ISBN 9780764154041.
- Treasure of the Silver Web: A Tale of Questing for Secrets in a Land of Mists and Mysteries. New Leaf, 2012. ISBN 9781870450775.
