= Religion in Ireland =

This is a list of articles about religion in both the Republic of Ireland and Northern Ireland.

- Religion in the Republic of Ireland
- Religion in Northern Ireland
- Irreligion in the Republic of Ireland
- Christianity in Ireland
  - History of Christianity in Ireland
  - Catholic Church in Ireland
  - Protestantism in Ireland
    - Reformation in Ireland
- Islam in Ireland
- Islam in Northern Ireland
- Hinduism in Ireland
  - Hinduism in the Republic of Ireland
  - Hinduism in Northern Ireland
- History of the Jews in Ireland
- History of the Jews in Northern Ireland
- Neo-paganism in the Republic of Ireland
- See Neopaganism in the United Kingdom for Neopaganism in Northern Ireland.
