= Neo-paganism in Ireland =

Neopaganism in Ireland:

- Neo-paganism in the Republic of Ireland
- See Neopaganism in the United Kingdom for Neopaganism in Northern Ireland .
