= Heathenry in the United Kingdom =

Heathenry in the United Kingdom consists of a variety of modern pagan movements attempting to revive pre-Christian Germanic religiosities, such as that practised in the British Isles by Anglo-Saxon and Nordic peoples prior to Christianisation.

== Religious belief and practice ==
Most modern-day heathens operate in small groups, often termed kindreds or hearths. There is a tendency for such groups to develop their own approaches to Heathenry independently, assisted by networking groups and Internet communication. Thus most kindreds remain unaffiliated with one another while remaining in contact.

Although Heathenry is a highly internally diverse religion, the most evident forms of ritual practice among the British Heathen community are the blot and the sumble. Blot is a ritual involving giving offerings to ancestors or beings such as land wights, elves or gods (the Æsir and Vanir). It is no longer common to sacrifice animals, with most heathens instead choosing to offer something personal to themselves such as handmade items or a drink such as mead. While a blot may be performed alone, a sumble is always a community event that may include rounds of toasting, drinking in turn (sometimes from a drinking horn) and swearing oaths.

== Places of worship ==
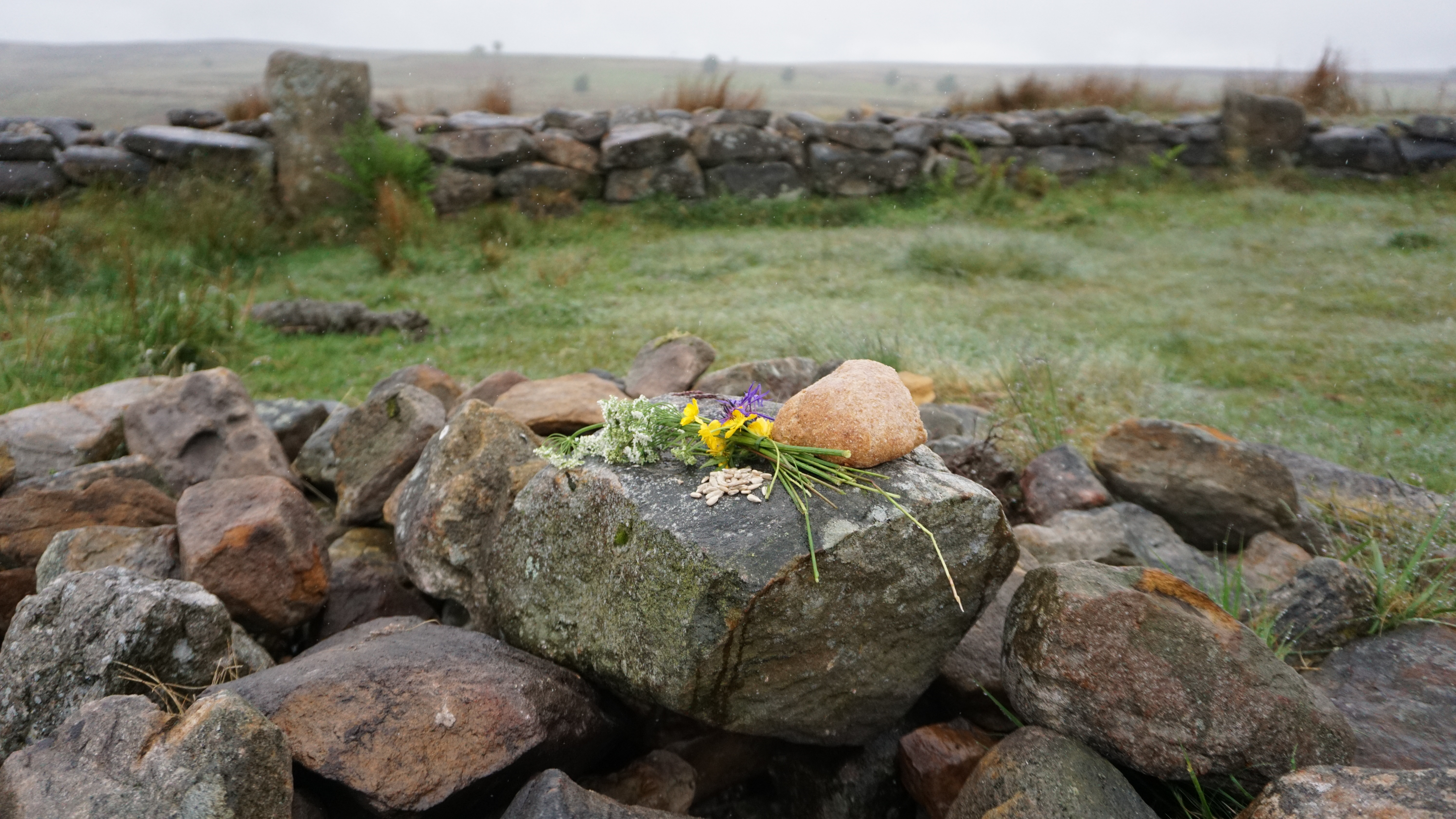
Votive offering of flowers and bread at Barbrook II stone circle, Derbyshire

There are no purpose-built Heathen temples in the UK. Heathen individuals and groups instead commonly choose to worship outdoors, particularly in nature or at ancient sites such as standing stones, stone circles or cairns.

== Demographics ==
In the United Kingdom Census 2001, 300 people registered as Heathen in England and Wales, while in the UK as a whole in 2001 were 278 Heathen and 92 Asatru. Many Heathens, however, followed the advice of the Pagan Federation (PF) and simply described themselves as "Pagan", while other Heathens did not specify their religious beliefs. The 2011 census however made it possible to describe oneself as Pagan-Heathen (or any other chosen subgroup). The figures for England and Wales show 1,958 people self-identifying as Heathen. A further 251 described themselves as Reconstructionist and may include some people reconstructing Germanic paganism.

== Heathen groups ==
=== Asatru UK ===
Asatru UK (AUK) is an inclusive Heathen community. "Inclusive" in this context is defined as having no intended exclusion of individuals based on gender, sexuality or ethnicity, and represents the mainstream of Heathenry. The group organised a first moot in York, in 2013, and became a community interest company for religious activities in 2022. The organisational body behind the group is composed of volunteers within the community and typically organises three moots a year, hosted around the country.

Asatru UK lists that it is open to anyone who follows Heathenry, regardless of nationality or ancestry and has openly condemned groups such as Woden's Folk, stating that "Asatru U.K. is categorically opposed to fascist movements, or any movements, using the symbols of our faith for hate". It is also a member of the Asatru-EU Network, a European network of Heathen organisations, along with groups such as Samfundet Forn Sed Sverige and Eldaring. In 2015, in response to the hate received by the Ásatrúarfélagið, the members of the network, including AUK, released a shared statement that they are "committed to Asatru as a non-exclusive religious approach", and that "heathenry is open for everyone who chooses so". They further vet potential members for association to far-right groups, or unwillingness to engage in religious practice with members who are transgender, homosexual or of a different ethnicity.

The group currently does not own land and thus is in the process of carving portable god posts for use in a vé. The first of these was of the god Odin and was consecrated at a gathering in 2021, with a god post of Freyja consecrated at a public gathering in 2022. Members of Asatru UK have been guests on, and are hosts of, podcasts that aim to promote the availability of accurate information regarding Germanic Paganism and promote the inclusion of people of diverse backgrounds within the international Heathen community. The group has also been involved with the Norse in the North conference, hosted in collaboration between the universities of Durham, Leeds and York, where in 2023 they spoke about the ways in which Heathenry and Old Norse scholarship can benefit one another.

=== Odinist and Wodenist groups ===
Within Heathenry, the term Odinist or Wodenist is typically used by neo-völkisch groups, who are characterised by their pseudoscientific beliefs that legitimate observance of the religion is predicated on belonging to a specific biological race and that the ability to hold a relationship with the gods in encoded in their DNA. Although often professing an apolitical stance, academic Ethan White characterises the ideologies of the three most visible neo-völkisch Heathen organisations in the UK (the Odinic Rite, the Odinist Fellowship and Woden's Folk) as belonging to the extreme right due to their racial nationalist stances, though he notes members of the group may not necessarily use this term to describe themselves.

The Odinic Rite is a neo-völkisch organisation that was founded in 1980 by the former member of the British Union of Fascists and National Socialists John Yeowell, known as "Stubba". On 24 February 1988 the Odinic Rite became the first polytheistic religious organisation to be granted Registered Charity status in England. In 1990, the Odinic Rite split into two separate organisations that initially both retained the original name. One continued to be known as Odinic Rite while the other changed its name in 1998 to the Odinist Fellowship. Both groups only allow white members, with the Odinist Fellowship describing Odinism as "ethnospecific" while the Odinic Rite stresses the need to maintain "racial integrity". While neither group describes itself as racist, the label has been used by scholars based on their racially exclusionary approach, glorification of "white" history and criticism of what they perceive as foreign influences.

The Odinist Fellowship has publications follows a ninefold calendar of festivals which include celebrations on the solstices and equinoxes. The Odinist Fellowship was involved in providing support to an Odinist postal worker dismissed by his employer for leaving printed images of Odin at his place of work. This led to a hearing in the Manchester Industrial Tribunal of Royal Mail PLC v Holden (2006) which found unequivocally in Mr. Holden's favour. In May 2014 the Odinist Fellowship purchased a Tudor-era chapel in Newark-on-Trent, Nottinghamshire, which was consecrated at Midsummer of that year as the first heathen Temple in England in over a thousand years. The Newark Temple is managed by a registered charity, the Newark Odinist Temple Trust.

Woden's Folk is a neo-völkisch group that was founded in 1998 and has received media attention for hate speech and holding private rituals attended by members of the Neo-Nazi group Combat 18. While the group describes itself as promoting a form of Heathenry, it does not attempt to revive Germanic religion, rejecting written and archaeological sources in favour of modern sources such as the founder's own spiritual revelations. Members often espouse beliefs such as that certain historical figures, including Adolf Hitler, were incarnations of Germanic gods, claiming the work of the Miguel Serrano validates this idea. It has been further noted that some components of the group's belief system such as references to the "Prophecies of Gildas" and a "Seventh Sword of Wayland" originated in the television series "Robin of Sherwood" and have no basis in folklore.

In 2019, the head of research at Hope not Hate stated that there are Neo-Nazis involved with groups like Woden's Folk who do not genuinely follow Heathenry but use these groups as a tool for radicalisation and justification of their ideas.

== Organisation and events ==
Anthropologist Jenny Blain noted that by 2005, it was common for Pagan moots (regular social gatherings) to contain a small number of Heathens. However, many Odinists distance themselves from the wider Pagan movement, which they deem to have been too heavily dominated by practitioners of Wicca. Thus, there are few Odinist members of the Pagan Federation, although increasingly mutual links between other Heathens and the Pagan Federation are being established. To this end the Pagan-Heathen symposium was established in order to foster support and dialogue between the rapidly diverging paths of heathenry and other forms of Modern Paganism.

The internet also provided a factor in unifying the British Heathen movement, as websites such as UKHeathenry and Midgard's Web became increasingly popular in the early 21st century. The popularity of Asatru UK also owes much to this, the rise of social media has allowed heathens to connect more effectively. Heathens were also involved in the creation of the Association of Polytheist Traditions, as well as the creation and maintenance of the International Asatru Summer Camp (IASC), a loose coalition of real-world heathen groups across Europe. Asatru UK is a signatory of the IASC, along with its sister group, the Kith of the Tree and the Well.

An annual gathering of Heathens in the UK called Heathenfest was held at Peterborough from 2005, it was organised by Woden's Hearth. Past speakers included Pete Jennings, Jenny Blain, Thorskegga Thorn and Stephen Pollington. However, this event is no longer extant. Between 2015 and 2019 another event, The Asgardian Heathen Festival was held annually with speakers, rituals and activities. This no longer runs, however, Asatru UK now hold at least one large event a year.

== See also ==
- Modern paganism in the United Kingdom
- Modern paganism in Scandinavia
- Religion in the United Kingdom
