= Scottish Pagan Federation =

The Scottish Pagan Federation (SPF) is a Scotland-based organisation which works to support the Neopagan community in Scotland. Originally part of the Pagan Federation, it became an independent organisation in 2006. The group seeks to promote tolerance of Neopaganism, spread information to the public, interface with other religions through interfaith activities, defend Neopagans from religious discrimination, and provide a network for Scottish Neopagans. They have been members of Interfaith Scotland since 2013. They run an annual conference which brings together Neopagans from across the country as well as an annual summer camp. In 2021 they announced the release of an official tartan designed by Tom Lanting intended for the use of Neopagans worldwide.

== History ==
The Pagan Federation was founded in 1971, and Scotland became a district within it in the early 1990s. Jean Fowler and her husband were the first District Managers. At this time, Scotland and Ireland were overseen jointly. John and Kitty Macintyre became the District Managers in 1997 and became active campaigners for improving the understanding and recognition of Neopaganism in Scotland. Under their leadership, the Scottish Pagan Federation was founded as an independent organisation in 2006. After the Macintyres announced their retirement in 2017, Steffy Von Scott and Jennifer Connolly took over as District Managers.

== The Three Principles ==
The SPF is organised around three core principles. These principles are designed to be compatible with the Scottish Government's legal recognition of Paganism as a religion within Scotland and with their strong interfaith engagement.

1. Love for and Kinship with Nature. Reverence for the life force and its ever-renewing cycles of life and death.
2. A positive morality, in which the individual is responsible for the discovery and development of their true nature in harmony with the outer world and community. This is often expressed as 'Do what you will, as long as it harms none'.
3. Recognition of the Divine, which transcends gender, acknowledging both the female and male aspect of Deity.

== Services ==
Public education to NGOs, civic society, the media and the general public is a core function of the SPF. Pagans still face prejudice in Scotland, so the SPF works to counter what they see as misrepresentations of their faith. Engagement with interfaith groups has formed a key role in the SPF's outreach strategy.

The SPF also exists to serve the Neopagan community of Scotland. They serve as a resource for Neopagans looking for celebrants in handfasting ceremonies or other religious rituals. The SPF is the only body that can register a Pagan Celebrant in the UK. They also provide chaplains for people in hospital, university students, and prisoners.

The SPF publishes a quarterly digital magazine called eSPIN for members. Every year they organise a conference which includes talks, workshops, discussion groups, entertainment, healing therapies, and market stalls. Their annual summer camp is targeted towards families and takes place in Clatt Village Hall.

== Activism ==
Leaders in the SPF have long campaigned for improved recognition and treatment of Neopagans in Scotland. One of their most notable campaigns has been to achieve census recognition for Paganism on the Scottish Census. Campaigning began in 2001 to get a Pagan tick-box in the census after numbers for small religious minorities were not released. The SPF believes that having a Pagan tick-box in the census is the only way to accurately report the number of Pagans in the UK, since Pagans use a large variety of write-in labels to identify their religion when there is no Pagan option and are sometimes suspicious of government forms. They hope that getting a more accurate count will enable them to better campaign for including Paganism in Religious Education curricula in the UK. In the 2011 Census, over 5,194 people identified themselves as Pagan in Scotland. The Scottish Census has confirmed that there will be a Pagan tick-box in the 2021 Census.

Leaders within the SPF have also been supportive of efforts to recognise the many people, mostly women, who were killed for witchcraft throughout Scotland's history. Some have, however, called for care to be taken when dealing with portraying the complicated historical relationship between modern Neopagan religions and historical witchcraft accusations, which mainly targeted Christians who were falsely accused for other cultural reasons, such as practising Catholicism within Presbyterian Scotland.

Many within the organisation are activists for environmental and ecological causes as they see protecting the environment as a religious duty. The SPF is also committed to creating a welcoming space within Scottish paganism for LGBTQIA+ people. The SPF was involved in the campaign to legalise same-sex marriage in Scotland as part of the Faith in Marriage coalition. The first pagan same-sex wedding in the UK was conducted in 2015 by Louise Park, the presiding officer of the SPF.

== See also ==
- Pagan Federation
- Religion in Scotland
- Neopaganism in the United Kingdom
