= Religion in Scotland =

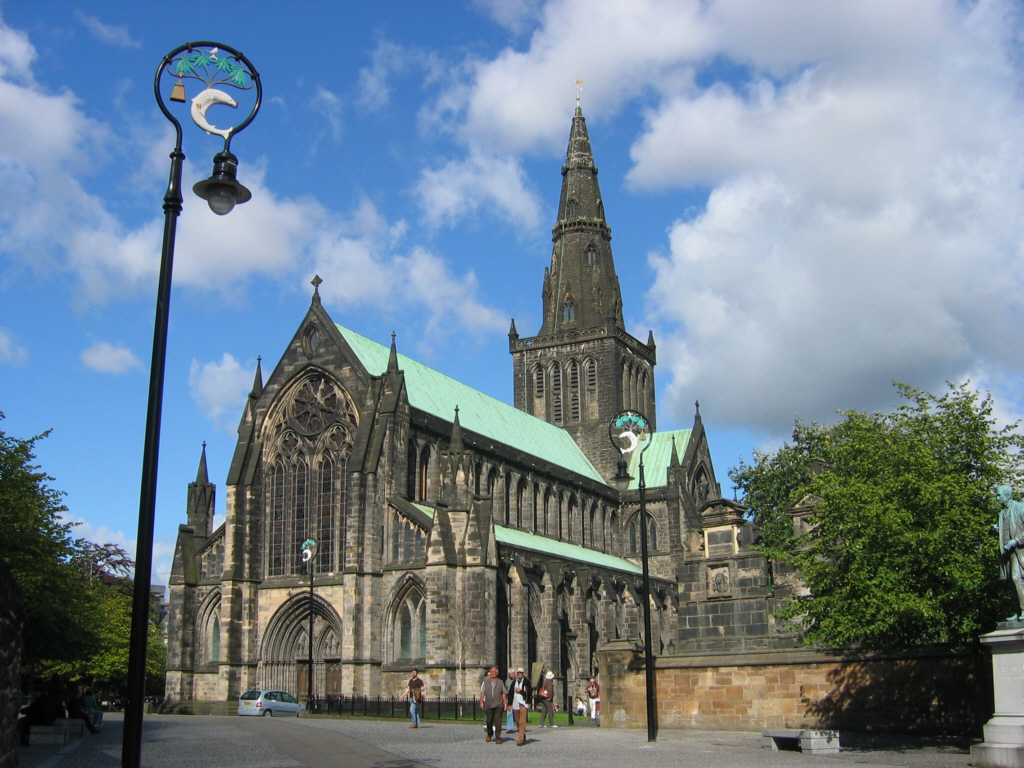
St. Mungo's Cathedral in Glasgow

As of the 2022 census, "No religion" was the largest religion category in Scotland. It was selected by 51.1% of the population, an increase from 36.7% in the 2011 census. The census religion question asks what religion, religious denomination or body a person belongs to, and does not measure whether they are a practising member of that religion.

Christianity accounted for 38.8% of the population in the 2022 census. The largest Christian group was the Church of Scotland, at 20.4% of the population, followed by the Roman Catholic Church at 13.3% and other Christian groups at 5.1%.

The Church of Scotland, a Presbyterian denomination also known as the Kirk, is recognised as Scotland's national church. It is not state-controlled, and its constitution states that it is free from civil interference in matters of doctrine, worship, government and discipline. Roman Catholic affiliation is particularly concentrated in parts of west-central Scotland, including Inverclyde, North Lanarkshire and West Dunbartonshire.

Non-Christian religions have grown alongside Scotland's increasing ethnic diversity and migration. The 2022 census reported that 12.9% of people in Scotland had a minority ethnic background, up from 8.2% in 2011, and that the proportion of people born outside the UK had increased from 7.0% to 10.2%. National Records of Scotland also noted that an increasing share of births in Scotland were to mothers born outside the UK.

The largest non-Christian religion in the 2022 census was Islam, with 119,872 people, or 2.2% of the population, up from 76,737 people, or 1.4%, in 2011. Other non-Christian religions recorded in the census included Hinduism, with 29,929 people, or 0.6%; Buddhism, with 15,501 people, or 0.3%; Sikhism, with 10,988 people, or 0.2%; and Judaism, with 5,847 people, or 0.1%. Paganism, which was added as a response option in the 2022 census, was recorded by 19,113 people, or 0.4% of the population.

The Scottish Household Survey recorded a continuing decline in religious belonging. In 2019, 56% of adults said that they did not belong to any religion, while the proportion belonging to the Church of Scotland had fallen from 34% in 2009 to 20% in 2019.

Humanist marriage ceremonies have become a significant part of religious and belief marriage practice in Scotland. In 2024, National Records of Scotland recorded 8,142 humanist marriage ceremonies, compared with 1,252 Church of Scotland ceremonies and 647 Roman Catholic ceremonies.

== Census statistics ==
The statistics from the 2022, 2011 and 2001 censuses are set out below.

Religion in Scotland (2022)
1. Not religious (51.1%)
2. Church of Scotland (20.4%)
3. Catholic Church (13.3%)
4. Other Christian (5.10%)
5. Islam (2.20%)
6. Other religions (1.70%)
7. Not stated (6.20%)

Current religion	2001		2011		2022	
Current religion	Number	%	Number	%	Number	%
Christianity	3,294,545	65.1	2,850,199	53.8	2,110,405	38.8
–Church of Scotland	2,146,251	42.4	1,717,871	32.4	1,107,796	20.4
–Catholic	803,732	15.9	841,053	15.9	723,322	13.3
–Other Christian	344,562	6.8	291,275	5.5	279,287	5.1
Islam	42,557	0.8	76,737	1.4	119,872	2.2
Hinduism	5,564	0.1	16,379	0.3	29,929	0.6
Buddhism	6,830	0.1	12,795	0.2	15,501	0.3
Sikhism	6,572	0.1	9,055	0.2	10,988	0.2
Judaism	6,448	0.1	5,887	0.1	5,847	0.1
Paganism	–	–	–	–	19,113	0.4
Other religion	26,974	0.5	15,196	0.3	12,425	0.2
No religion	1,394,460	27.6	1,941,116	36.7	2,780,900	51.1
Religion not stated	278,061	5.5	368,039	7.0	334,862	6.2
Total population	5,062,011	100.0	5,295,403	100.0	5,439,842	100.0

== History ==
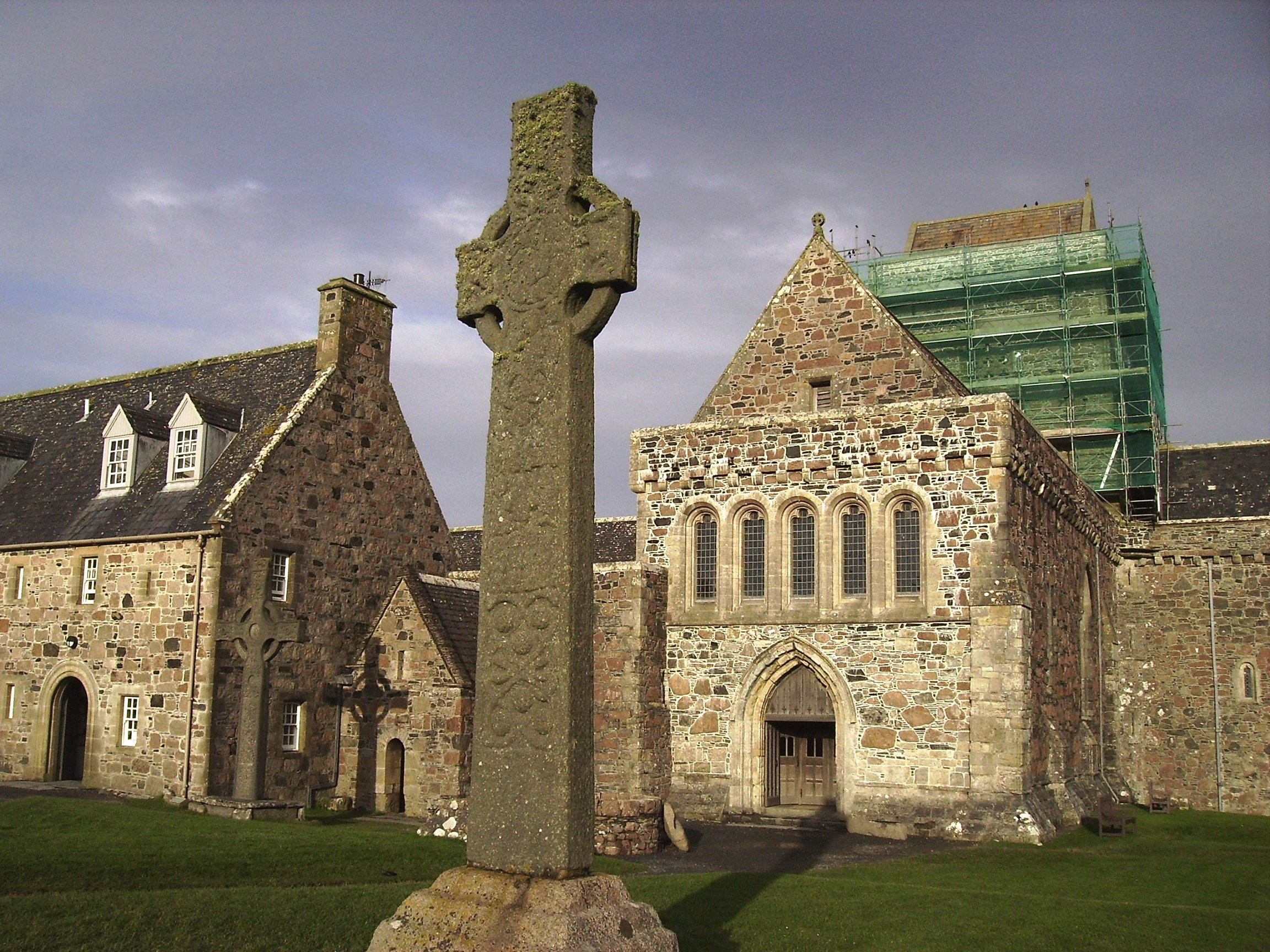
The ninth-century St Martin's Cross, in front of Iona Abbey, the site of one of the most important religious centres in Scotland

Christianity was probably introduced to what is now southern Scotland during the Roman occupation of Britain. It was mainly spread by missionaries from Ireland from the 5th century and is associated with St Ninian, St Kentigern, and St Columba. The Christianity that developed in Ireland and Scotland differed from that led by Rome, particularly over the method of calculating Easter and the form of tonsure, until the Celtic church accepted Roman practices in the mid-7th century. Christianity in Scotland was strongly influenced by monasticism, with abbots being more significant than bishops. In the Norman period, there were a series of reforms resulting in a clearer parochial structure based around local churches; and large numbers of new monastic foundations, which followed continental forms of reformed monasticism, began to predominate. The Scottish church also established its independence from England, developing a clear diocesan structure and becoming a "special daughter of the see of Rome" but continued to lack Scottish leadership in the form of archbishops. In the late Middle Ages the Crown was able to gain greater influence over senior appointments, and two archbishoprics had been established by the end of the 15th century. There was a decline in traditional monastic life but the mendicant orders of friars grew, particularly in the expanding burghs. New saints and cults of devotion also proliferated. Despite problems over the number and quality of clergy after the Black Death in the 14th century, and evidence of heresy in the 15th century, the Church in Scotland remained stable.

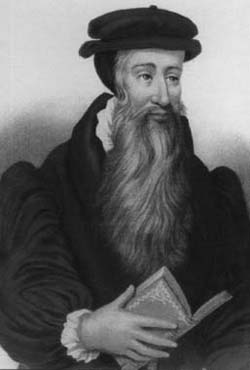
John Knox, a key figure in the Scottish Reformation

During the 16th century, Scotland underwent a Protestant Reformation that created a predominantly Calvinist national kirk, which was strongly Presbyterian in outlook. A confession of faith, rejecting papal jurisdiction and the mass, was adopted by Parliament in 1560. The kirk found it difficult to penetrate the Highlands and Islands, but began a gradual process of conversion and consolidation that, compared with reformations elsewhere, was conducted with relatively little persecution. James VI of Scotland favoured doctrinal Calvinism but supported the bishops. Charles I of England brought in reforms seen by some as a return to papal practice. The result was the Bishop's Wars in 1639–40, ending in virtual independence for Scotland and the establishment of a fully Presbyterian system by the dominant Covenanters. After the Restoration of the Monarchy in 1660, Scotland regained its kirk, but also the bishops. Particularly in the south-west many of the people began to attend illegal field conventicles. Suppression of these assemblies in the 1680s was known as "the Killing Time". After the "Glorious Revolution" in 1688, Presbyterianism was restored.

The Church of Scotland had been created in the Reformation. Then the late 18th century saw the beginnings of its fragmentation around issues of government and patronage, but also reflecting a wider division between the Evangelicals and the Moderate Party. In 1733 the First Secession led to the creation of a series of secessionist churches, and the second in 1761 to the foundation of the independent Relief Church. These churches gained strength in the Evangelical Revival of the later 18th century. Penetration of the Highlands and Islands remained limited. The efforts of the Kirk were supplemented by missionaries of the SSPCK, the Society in Scotland for Propagating Christian Knowledge. Episcopalianism retained supporters, but declined because of its associations with Jacobitism. Beginning in 1834 the "Ten Years' Conflict" ended in a schism from the church, led by Dr Thomas Chalmers, known as the Great Disruption of 1843. Roughly a third of the clergy, mainly from the North and Highlands, formed the separate Free Church of Scotland. The evangelical Free Churches grew rapidly in the Highlands and Islands. In the late 19th century, major debates, between fundamentalist Calvinists and theological liberals, resulted in a further split in the Free Church as the rigid Calvinists broke away to form the Free Presbyterian Church in 1893.

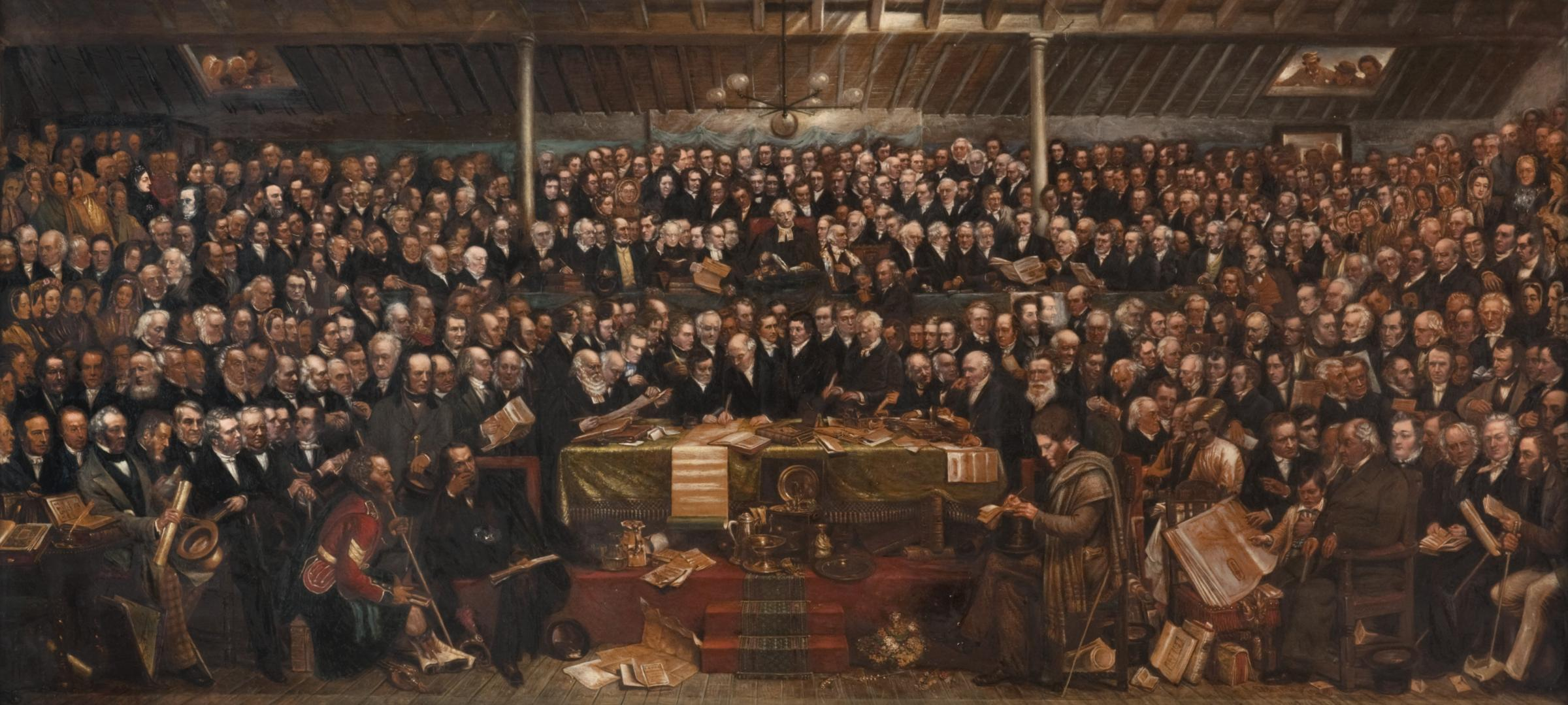
The Disruption Assembly, painted by David Octavius Hill

From this point there were moves towards reunion, and most of the Free Church rejoined the Church of Scotland in 1929. The schisms left small denominations including the Free Presbyterians and a remnant that had not merged in 1900 as the Free Church. Catholic Emancipation in 1829 and the influx of large numbers of Irish immigrants led to an expansion of Catholicism, with the restoration of the Church hierarchy in 1878. Episcopalianism also revived in the 19th century; the Episcopal Church in Scotland was organised as an autonomous body in communion with the Church of England in 1804. Other denominations included Baptists, Congregationalists, and Methodists. In the twentieth century, existing Christian denominations were joined by the Brethren and Pentecostal churches. Although some denominations thrived, after World War II there was a steady overall decline in church attendance and resulting church closures in most denominations.

== Christianity ==
=== Protestantism ===
==== Church of Scotland (Presbyterian) ====
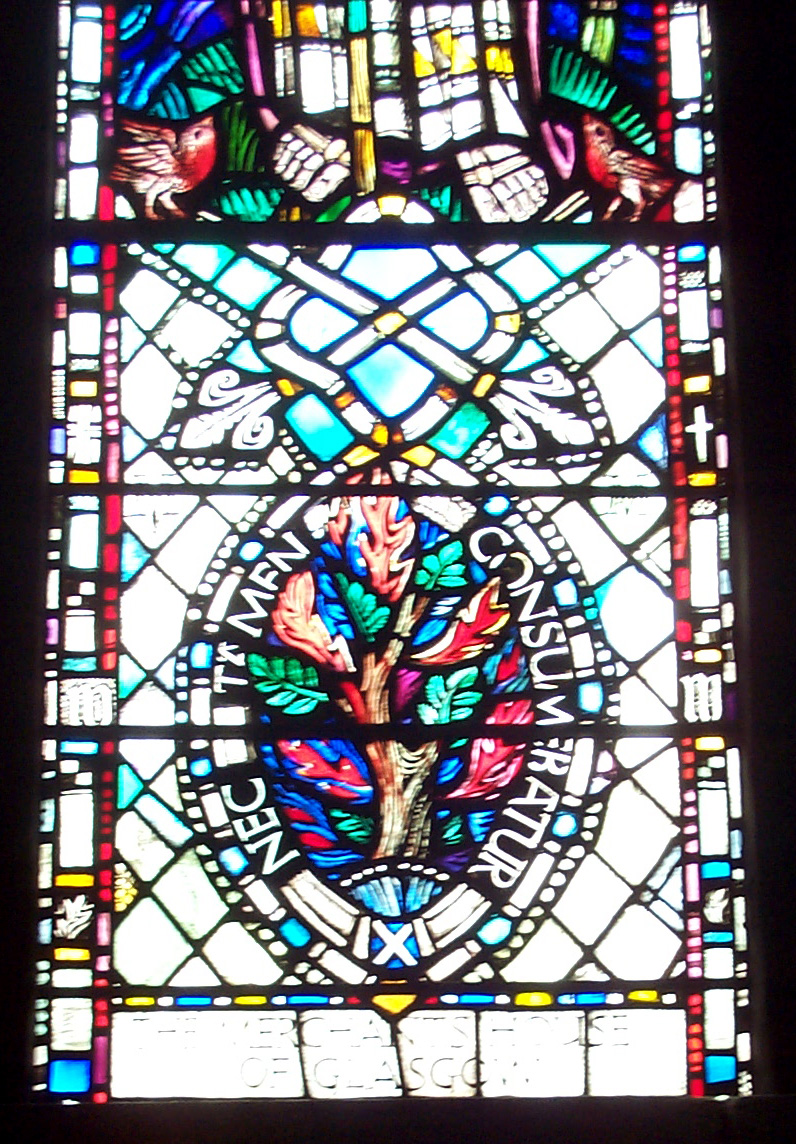
Stained glass showing the burning bush and the motto nec tamen consumebatur, St. Mungo's Cathedral, Glasgow.

The British Parliament passed the Church of Scotland Act 1921, recognising the full independence of the church in matters spiritual, and as a result of this and passage of the Church of Scotland (Property and Endowments) Act, 1925, which settled the issue of patronage in the church, the Church of Scotland was able to unite with the United Free Church of Scotland in 1929. The United Free Church of Scotland was itself the product of the union of the former United Presbyterian Church of Scotland and the majority of the Free Church of Scotland in 1900. The 1921 Act recognised the kirk as the national church and the monarch became an ordinary member of the Church of Scotland, represented at the General Assembly by their Lord High Commissioner.

In the second half of the 20th century and afterwards the Church was particularly affected by the general decline in church attendance. Between 1966 and 2006 numbers of communicants in the Church of Scotland dropped from over 1,230,000 to 504,000. Formal membership reduced from 446,000 in 2010 to 398,389 or 7.5% of the total population by year end 2013, dropping to 325,695 or 6% of the Scottish population by year end 2018. By 2020, membership had fallen further to 297,345 or 5% of the total population. As at December 2021 there were 283,600 members of the Church of Scotland, December 2022, 270,300 members and as of December 2023, 259,200 members. In ten years period (2013–2023) the number of members has fallen by 35%. And most recently, as of 31 December 2025, the congregations of the Church of Scotland recorded 229,000 members or 4 % of the total population.

In 2016, the actual weekly attendance at a Kirk service was estimated to be 136,910. In the twenty-first century the Church has faced financial issues, with a £5.7 million deficit in 2010. In response the church adopted a "prune to grow" policy, cutting 100 posts and introducing job-shares and unpaid ordained staff. In the 2022 national census, 20.4% of Scots identified their religion as "Church of Scotland", which aligns with a 2019 Scottish Household Survey with showed 20% of Scots self-reported themselves as adherents. By 2023, the Church estimated that around 60,000 people worshipped in church on a Sunday, a drop from 88,000 before the COVID-19 pandemic.

==== Other Presbyterian denominations ====
After the reunification of the Church of Scotland and the United Free Church, some independent Scottish Presbyterian denominations still remained. These included the Free Church of Scotland (formed of those congregations which refused to unite with the United Presbyterian Church in 1900), the United Free Church of Scotland (formed of congregations which refused to unite with the Church of Scotland in 1929), the Reformed Presbyterian Church of Scotland, the Free Presbyterian Church of Scotland (which broke from the Free Church of Scotland in 1893), the Associated Presbyterian Churches (which emerged as a result of a split in the Free Presbyterian Church of Scotland in the 1980s), and the Free Church of Scotland (Continuing) (which emerged from a split in the Free Church of Scotland in 2000). In recent years, four congregations of the International Presbyterian Church have also arisen in Scotland, all founded as a result of evangelicals leaving the Church of Scotland over recent issues. In addition, there are two congregations belonging to the Free Presbyterian Church of Ulster located in Scotland. Similarly, five former Church of Scotland congregations have partnered together within the Didasko Presbytery (Cornerstone Community Church, Stirling; Edinburgh North Church; Gilcomston Church, Aberdeen; Grace Church, Dundee; and The Tron Church, Glasgow). Thus, there are 10 Presbyterian denominations represented within Scotland.

At the 2011 census, 3,553 people responded as Other Christian – Presbyterian (i.e. not Church of Scotland), 1,197 as Other Christian – Free Presbyterian, 313 as Other Christian – Evangelical Presbyterian Church, and as few as 12 people as Other Christian – Scottish Presbyterianism. At the 2022 census, 3,567 people responded as Other Christian – Presbyterian, 469 as Other Christian – Free Presbyterian, 847 as Other Christian – Evangelical Presbyterian Church, and 99 people as Other Christian – Reformed Presbyterian.

Those identifying with a particular Presbyterian denomination other than the Church of Scotland were:

Denomination	1994 Sunday church attendance (Scottish Church Census)	2002 Sunday church attendance (Scottish Church Census)	2011 People identifying (National Census)	2016 Sunday church attendance (Scottish Church Census)	2022 People identifying (National Census)
Free Church of Scotland	15,510	12,810	10,896	10,210	10,739
United Free Church of Scotland	5,840	5,370	1,514	3,220	1,289
Free Church of Scotland (Continuing)	Not yet split from FCofS	1,520		830	
Free Presbyterian Church of Scotland			132		848
Reformed Presbyterian Church			57		99
Free Presbyterian Church of Ulster			14		
Presbyterian Church in Ireland			11		10
Presbyterian Church of Wales					16

==== Free Church of Scotland ====
The second largest Presbyterian denomination in Scotland is the Free Church of Scotland with 10,896 people identifying as being of that church at the 2011 census. According to the Free Church, its average weekly attendance at a worship service is around 12,000. According to the 2016 Church Census, Free Church attendance was around 10,000 per week and amounted to 7% of all Presbyterian church attendance in Scotland. As of 2016 there were 102 Free Church congregations, organised into six presbyteries. By 2025, it had grown to 114 congregations. A significant proportion of Free Church activity is to be found in the Highlands and Islands; however, a growing percentage of the Free Church of Scotland's congregations and membership is now within the cities and larger towns of Scotland, largely as a result of recent church plants.

==== Scottish Episcopal Church ====
The Scottish Episcopal Church is the member church of the Anglican Communion in Scotland. It is made up of seven dioceses, each with its own bishop. It dates from the Glorious Revolution in 1689 when the national church was defined as presbyterian instead of episcopal in government. The bishops and those that followed them became the Scottish Episcopal Church.

Scotland's third largest church, the Scottish Episcopal Church has 303 local congregations. In terms of official membership, Episcopalians nowadays constitute well under 1 per cent of the population of Scotland, making them considerably smaller than the Church of Scotland that represents nearly 5 per cent of the Scottish population.

The all-age membership of the church in 2022 was 23,503 of whom 16,605 were communicant members. Weekly attendance was 8,815. The all-age membership of the church in 2018 was 28,647, of whom 19,983 were communicant members. Weekly attendance was 12,430. For 2013, the Scottish Episcopal Church reported its numbers as 34,119 members (all ages). The 2022 census recorded 15,735 people identifying with it (along with many others identifying as other Anglican denominations, including 45,063 as Church of England; 5,600 as Episcopalian; 4,161 as Anglican; 1,374 as Church of Ireland; and 426 as Church in Wales).

==== Other Protestant denominations ====
Other Protestant denominations which entered Scotland, usually from England, before the 20th century included the Quakers, Baptists, Methodists and Brethren. By 1907 the Open Brethren had 196 meetings and by 1960 it was 350, with perhaps 25,000 people. The smaller Exclusive Brethren had perhaps another 3,000. Both were geographically and socially diverse, but particularly recruited in fishing communities in the Islands and East. In the 2011 census 5,583 identified themselves as Brethren, 10,979 as Methodist, 1,339 as Quaker, 26,224 as Baptist, and 13,229 as Evangelical. In the 2022 census 3,376 identified themselves as Brethren, 8,088 as Methodist, 1,409 as Quaker, 22,160 as Baptist, and 14,494 as Evangelical.

Pentecostal churches were present from 1908 and by the 1920s there were three streams: Elim, Assemblies of God and the Apostolic Church. A Holiness movement, inspired by Methodism, emerged in 1909 and by 1915 was part of the American Church of the Nazarene. The 2011 census lists 12,357 Pentecostals and 785 Church of the Nazarene. In the 2022 census, there were recorded a growth in those identifying within the Pentecostal movement, with 18,954 Pentecostals, 2,048 Charismatics, 857 from the Apostolic Church, 850 Church of the Nazarene, and 35 from the Full Gospel Assembly.

=== Catholicism ===
Percentage claiming to be Catholic in the 2011 census in Scotland

During much of the 20th century and beyond, significant numbers of Catholics emigrated to Scotland from Italy, Lithuania, and Poland. According to the catholic Bishops' Conference of Scotland, there were 674,800 Catholics representing 12 % of the Scottish population in the year 2025.

According to the 2011 census, Catholics comprise 15.9% of the overall population. In 2011, Catholics outnumbered adherents of the Church of Scotland in just four of the council areas, including North Lanarkshire, Inverclyde, West Dunbartonshire, and the most populous council, Glasgow City. According to the 2019 Scottish Household Survey, 13% of the adult Scottish population identified with Catholicism.

Between 1994 and 2002 Catholic attendance in Scotland declined 19%, to just over 200,000. By 2008, the Bishops' Conference of Scotland estimated that 184,283 attended mass regularly in that year: 3.6% of Scotland's population. The statistical returns in the Catholic Directory for Scotland 2025 stated that the average weekly Mass attendance in November 2023 was 95,029.

In February 2013, Cardinal Keith O'Brien resigned as Archbishop of St Andrews and Edinburgh after allegations of sexual misconduct against him. Subsequently, there were several other cases of alleged sexual misconduct involving other priests. O'Brien was replaced as Archbishop of St Andrews and Edinburgh by Leo Cushley.

=== Orthodoxy ===
The various branches of Orthodox Christianity (including Russian, Greek, and Coptic) had around 8,900 respondents at the 2011 census. This has grown in the 2022 census. In that census, 13,645 identified simply as Orthodox Church, with approximately 9,000 detailing a particular branch (4,884 as Greek Orthodox; 1,916 as Eastern; 1,694 as Russian; 475 as Coptic; 94 as Romanian; 56 as Serbian; 42 as Ukrainian and 35 as Bulgarian).

=== Non-Trinitarian denominations ===
Non-Trinitarian denominations such as the Jehovah's Witnesses with 8,543 respondents in the 2011 census and The Church of Jesus Christ of Latter-day Saints with 4,651 are also present in Scotland. However, the LDS Church claims a higher number of followers with their own 2009 numbers listing 26,536 followers (in 27 wards and 14 branches).

== Islam ==
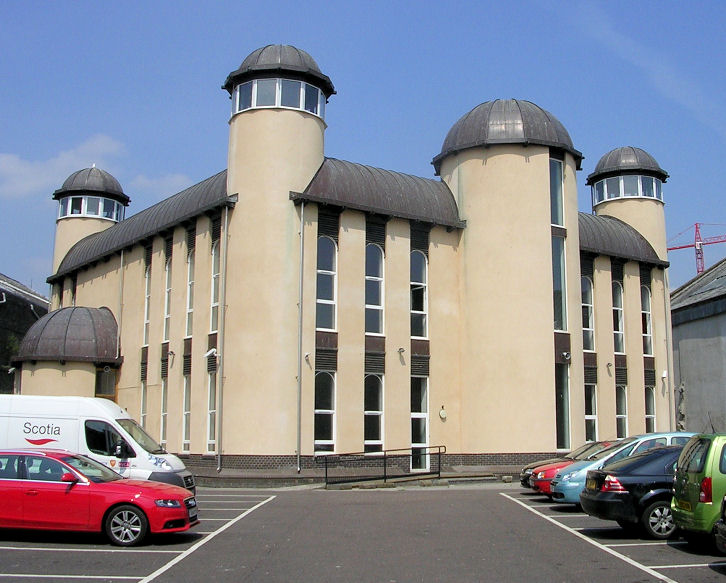
Dundee Central Mosque, the first in Scotland built for that purpose

Islam is the second most followed religion after Christianity in Scotland. The first Muslim student in Scotland was Wazir Beg from Bombay (now Mumbai). He is recorded as being a medical student who studied at the University of Edinburgh between 1858 and 1859. The production of goods and Glasgow's busy port meant that many lascars were employed there. Dundee was at the peak of importing jute; hence, sailors from Bengal were a feature at the port. The 1903 records from the Glasgow Sailors' Home show that nearly a third (5,500) of all boarders were Muslim lascars. Most immigration of Muslims to Scotland is relatively recent. The bulk of Muslims in Scotland come from families who immigrated during the late 20th century, with small numbers of converts. In 2022 Muslims represented 2.2 per cent of the Scottish population (119,872, up from 76,737 in 2011). Two important mosques in Scotland are Glasgow Central Mosque and Edinburgh Central Mosque, which took more than six years to complete at a cost of £3.5m and can accommodate over one thousand worshippers in its main hall.

== Judaism ==
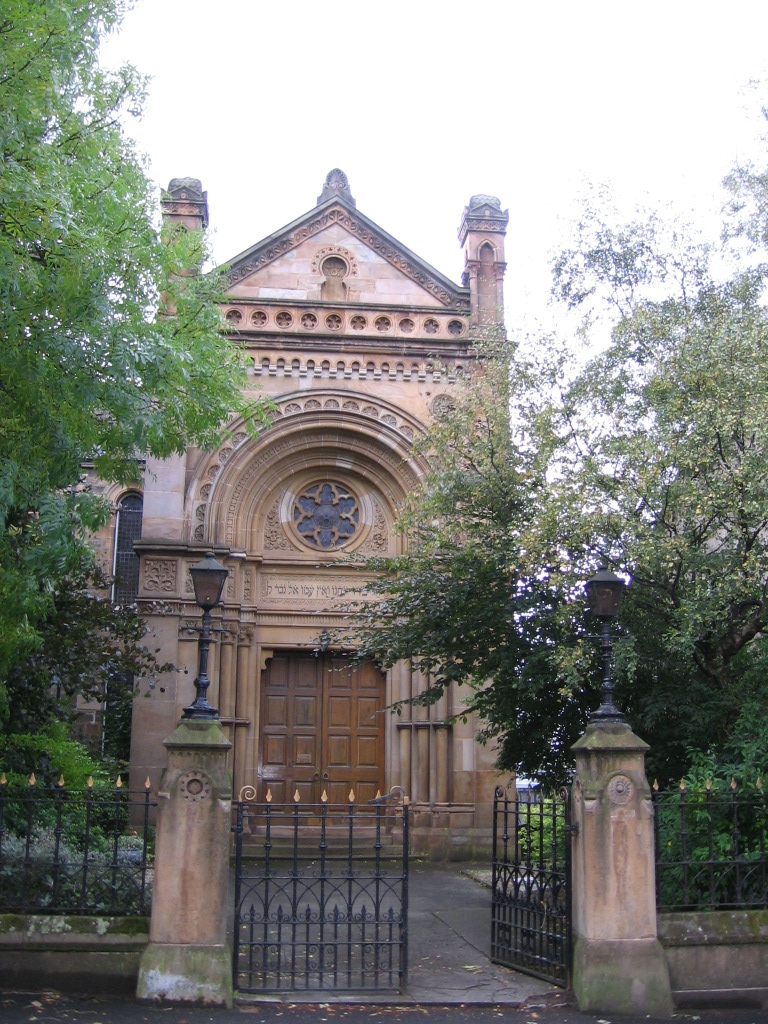
Garnethill Synagogue (built 1879) in Glasgow is the oldest synagogue in Scotland

Towards the end of the nineteenth century there was an influx of Jews, most from eastern Europe, escaping poverty and persecution. Many were skilled in the tailoring, furniture, and fur trades and congregated in the working class districts of Lowland urban centres, like the Gorbals in Glasgow. The largest community in Glasgow had perhaps reached 5,000 by the end of the century. A synagogue was built at Garnethill in 1879. Over 8,000 Jews were resident in Scotland in 1903. Refugees from Nazism and the Second World War further augmented the Scottish Jewish community, which has been estimated to have reached 80,000 in the middle of the century.

According to the 2001 census, approximately 6,400 Jews lived in Scotland; however, by the 2011 census this had fallen to 5,887. Scotland's Jewish population continues to be predominantly urban, with 80 per cent resident in the areas surrounding Glasgow, primarily East Renfrewshire, that area in particular containing 41% of Scotland's Jewish population, despite only containing 1.7% of the overall population. As with Christianity, the practising Jewish population continues to fall, as many younger Jews either become secular or intermarry with other faiths. Scottish Jews have also emigrated in large numbers to the US, England, and the Commonwealth for economic reasons, as with other Scots.

The formally organised Jewish communities in Scotland now include Glasgow Jewish Representative Council, Edinburgh Hebrew congregation and Sukkat Shalom Liberal Community, Aberdeen Synagogue and Jewish Community Centre, and Tayside and Fife Jewish Community. These are all represented by the Scottish Council of Jewish Communities, alongside groups like the Jewish Network of Argyll and the Highlands, Jewish students studying in Scottish universities and colleges, and Jewish people of Israeli origin living in Scotland.

== Sikhism ==
According to the 2022 census, Sikhism represented 0.2% of the Scotland's population (10,988). Maharajah Duleep Singh moved to Scotland in 1854, taking up residence at the Grandtully estate in Perthshire. According to the Scottish Sikh Association, the first Sikhs settled in Glasgow in the early 1920s with the first Gurdwara established on South Portland Street. However, the bulk of Sikhs in Scotland come from families who immigrated during the late 20th century.

== Hinduism ==
According to the 2022 census, 29,929 people identified as Hindu, representing 0.6% of the population of Scotland. The bulk of Scottish Hindus settled there in the second half of the 20th century. At the 2001 Census, 5,600 people identified as Hindu, which then equated to 0.1% of the Scottish population. Most Scottish Hindus are of Indian origin, or at least from neighbouring countries such as Sri Lanka, Pakistan, Nepal, and Bangladesh. Many of these came after Idi Amin's expulsion from Uganda in the 1970s, and some also came from South Africa. There are also a few of Indonesian and Afghan origin. In 2006 a temple opened in the West End of Glasgow. However, it was severely damaged by a fire in May 2010. There are also temples in Edinburgh and Dundee with plans announced in 2008 for a temple in Aberdeen.

== Modern Paganism ==
Modern Pagan religions such as Wicca, Druidry, and Celtic Reconstructionist Paganism have their origins in academic interest and romantic revivalism, which emerged in new religious movements in the twentieth century. Gerald Gardner, a retired British civil servant, founded modern Wicca. He cultivated his Scottish connections and initiated his first Scottish followers in the 1950s. The Findhorn community, founded in 1962 by Peter and Eileen Caddy, became a centre of a variety of new age beliefs that mixed beliefs including occultism, animism, and eastern religious beliefs. The ancient architectural landscape of pre-Christian Britain, such as stone circles and dolmens, gives pagan beliefs an attraction, identity, and nationalist legitimacy. The rise of pan-Celticism may also have increased the attractiveness of Celtic neopaganism. In the 2011 census 5,282 identified as Pagan or a related belief, and this number rose to 19,113 in the 2022 census. The Scottish Pagan Federation has represented Modern Pagans in Scotland since 2006.

== Buddhism ==
According to the 2022 census, 15,501 people in Scotland—0.3 per cent—are Buddhist.

== Bahá'í Faith ==
Scotland's Baháʼí history began around 1905 when European visitors, Scots among them, met `Abdu'l-Bahá, then head of the religion, in Ottoman Palestine. One of the first and most prominent Scots who became a Baháʼí was John Esslemont (1874–1925). Starting in the 1940s a process of promulgating the religion called pioneering by Baháʼís began for the purpose of teaching the religion. This led to new converts and establishment of local Spiritual Assemblies, and eventually a Baháʼí Council for all Scotland was elected under the National Assembly of the Baháʼís of the United Kingdom. According to the 2011 Census in Scotland, 459 people living there declared themselves to be Bahá'ís, compared to a 2004 figure of approximately 5,000 Baháʼís in the United Kingdom.

== Irreligion ==
Historical Population
Year	Pop.	±%
2001	1,394,460	—
2011	1,941,116	+39.2%
2022	2,780,900	+43.3%
Religious Affiliation was not recorded prior to 2001.

=== Ethnicity ===
The table shows the irreligious populations among ethnic groups and nationalities in Scotland.

Irreligious by Ethnic group
Ethnic group	2022	
Ethnic group	Number	% of Ethnic group reported no religion
– Scottish	2,267,031	53.63
– British	289,876	56.80
– Irish	18,764	32.99
– Polish	24,312	26.79
– Gypsy and Irish Traveller	1,496	44.75
– Roma	919	24.00
– Other White	76,584	46.81
– Mixed	33,090	54.34
– Indian	4,823	9.11
– Pakistani	3,389	4.65
– Bangladeshi	515	7.43
– Chinese	34,762	73.84
– Other Asian	7,302	22.69
– African	5,366	9.15
– Caribbean or Black	2,611	38.52
– Arab	2,057	9.22
– Other Ethnic group	7,254	26.54
TOTAL	2,780,900	51.1

== Religious leaders ==
- Church of Scotland: The Moderator of the General Assembly of the Church of Scotland convenes the annual assembly, but does not "lead", the church. Moderators are limited to serving one year in office. The moderator-designate is nominated in October and takes office in the following May. The current Moderator for 2025-2026 is Rosemary Frew of Bowden and Melrose Parish Church, Melrose.
- Catholic Church in Scotland: Leo Cushley, Archbishop of St Andrews and Edinburgh (see Bishops' Conference of Scotland, installed 8 September 2013).
- Scottish Episcopal Church: The Presiding Bishop of the Scottish Episcopal Church is called the Primus. The current Primus is Mark Strange, Diocese of Moray, Ross and Caithness, who has held the role since 27 June 2017.

== Religious issues ==
=== Sectarianism ===
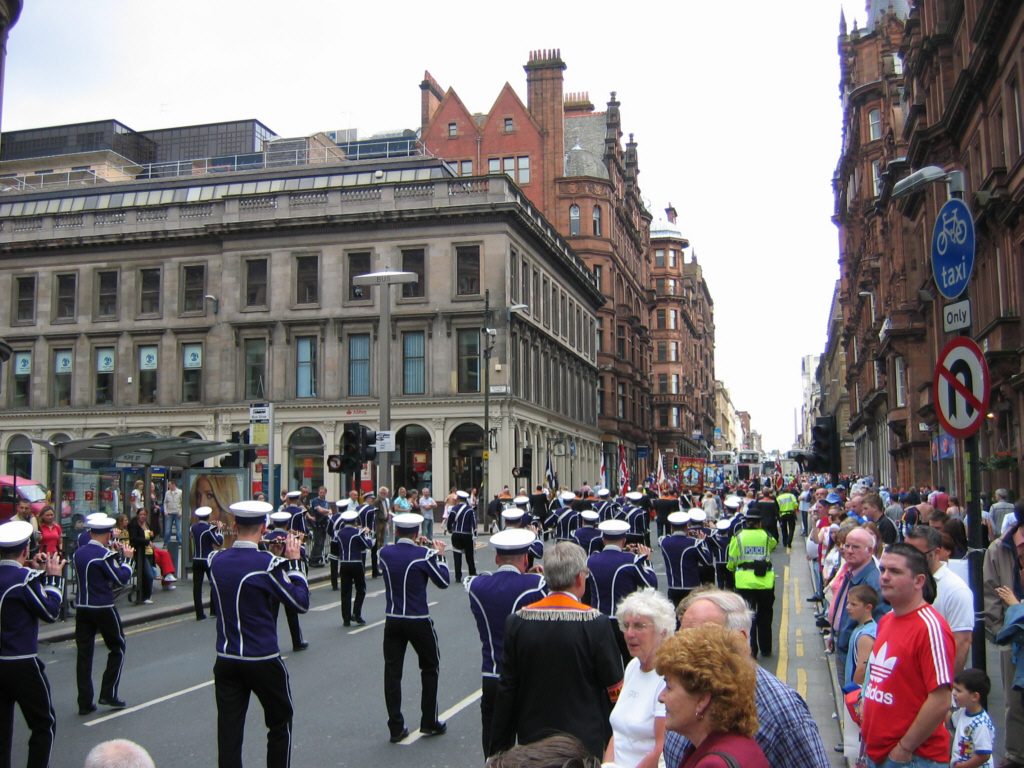
An Orange Order march in Glasgow

Sectarianism became a serious problem in the twentieth century. In the interwar period religious and ethnic tensions between Protestants and Catholics were exacerbated by the Great Depression. Tensions were heightened by the leaders of the Church of Scotland who orchestrated a racist campaign against the Catholic Irish in Scotland. Key figures leading the campaign were George Malcolm Thomson and Andrew Dewar Gibb. This focused on the threat to the "Scottish race" based on spurious statistics that continued to have influence despite being discredited by official figures in the early 1930s. This created a climate of intolerance that led to calls for jobs to be preserved for Protestants. After the Second World War the Church became increasingly liberal in attitude and moved away from hostile attitudes. Sectarian attitudes continued to manifest themselves in football rivalries between predominantly Protestant and Catholic teams. This was most marked in Glasgow with the traditionally Catholic team, Celtic, and the traditionally Protestant team, Rangers. Celtic employed Protestant players and managers, but Rangers have had a tradition of not recruiting Catholics. This is not a hard and fast rule, however, as evidenced by Rangers signing of the Catholic player Mo Johnston (born 1963) in 1989 and in 1999 their first Catholic captain, Lorenzo Amoruso.

From the 1980s the UK government passed several acts that had a provision concerning sectarian violence. These included the Public Order Act 1986, which introduced offences relating to the incitement of racial hatred, and the Crime and Disorder Act 1998, which introduced offences of pursuing a racially aggravated course of conduct that amounts to harassment of a person. The 1998 Act also required courts to take into account where offences are racially motivated, when determining sentence. In the twenty-first century the Scottish Parliament legislated against sectarianism. This included provision for religiously aggravated offences in the Criminal Justice (Scotland) Act 2003. The Criminal Justice and Licensing (Scotland) Act 2010 strengthened statutory aggravations for racial and religiously motivated crimes. The Offensive Behaviour at Football and Threatening Communications (Scotland) Act 2012 criminalised behaviour which is threatening, hateful, or otherwise offensive at a regulated football match including offensive singing or chanting. It also criminalised the communication of threats of serious violence and threats intended to incite religious hatred.

=== Ecumenism ===
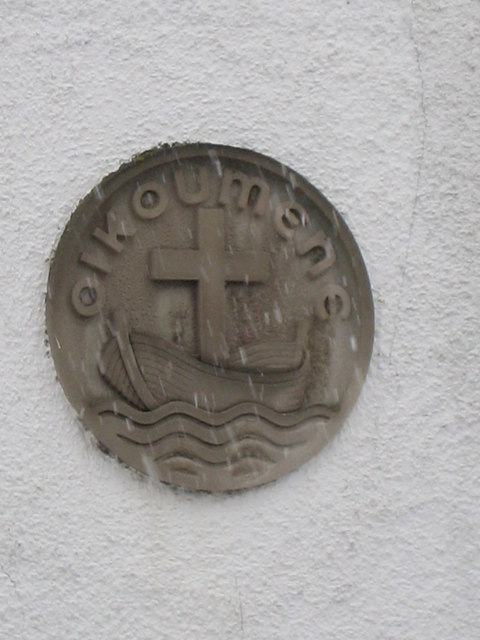
Plaque on Scottish Churches House, Dunblane, one of the major centres of the ecumenical movement in Scotland in the twentieth century

Relations between Scotland's churches steadily improved during the second half of the twentieth century and there were several initiatives for co-operation, recognition, and union. The Scottish Council of Churches was formed as an ecumenical body in 1924. The foundation of the ecumenical Iona Community in 1938, on the island of Iona off the coast of Scotland, led to a highly influential form of music, which was used across Britain and the US. Leading musical figure John Bell (born 1949) adapted folk tunes or created tunes in a folk style to fit lyrics that often emerged from the spiritual experience of the community. Proposals in 1957 for union with the Church of England were rejected over the issue of bishops and were severely attacked in the Scottish press. The Scottish Episcopal church opened the communion table up to all baptised and communicant members of all the trinitarian churches and church canons were altered to allow the interchangeability of ministers within specific local ecumenical partnerships.

The Dunblane consultations, informal meetings at the ecumenical Scottish Church House in Dunblane in 1961–69, attempted to produce modern hymns that retained theological integrity. They resulted in the British "Hymn Explosion" of the 1960s, which produced multiple collections of new hymns. In 1990, the Scottish Churches' Council was dissolved and replaced by Action of Churches Together in Scotland (ACTS), which attempted to bring churches together to set up ecumenical teams in the areas of prisons, hospitals, higher education, and social ministries and inner city projects. At the end of the twentieth century the Scottish Churches Initiative for Union (SCIFU), between the Episcopal Church, the Church of Scotland, the Methodist Church, and the United Reformed Church, put forward an initiative whereby there would have been mutual recognition of all ordinations and that subsequent ordinations would have satisfied episcopal requirements, but this was rejected by the General Assembly in 2003.

=== Irreligion ===
Church attendance in all denominations declined after the First World War. By the 1920s roughly half the population had a relationship with one of the Christian denominations. This level was maintained until the 1940s when it dipped to 40% during the Second World War, but it increased in the 1950s as a result of revivalist preaching campaigns, particularly the 1955 tour by Billy Graham, and returned to almost pre-war levels. However, from that point there was a steady decline and by the 1980s it was just over 30%. The decline most affected urban areas and was most noticeable among the traditional skilled working classes and educated working classes, although participation stayed higher in the Catholic Church than the Protestant denominations.

In the 2022 Census, 51.1% of the population identified as 'None' with respect to religious affiliation (in the 2011 census 36.7% had stated they had no religion, while 5.5 per cent did not state a religion. In 2001, 27.5% had stated that they had no religion; compared with 15.5% in the UK overall). A study carried out on behalf of the British Humanist Association at the same time as the 2011 census suggested that those not identifying with a denomination, or who saw themselves as non-religious, may have been much higher at between 42 and 56 per cent, depending on the form of the question asked.

In 2016 the Scottish Social Attitudes Survey found that 52% of people said they are not religious. The decline was most rapid in the Church of Scotland, from 35% in 1999 to 20%, while the Catholic (15%) and other Christian (11%) affiliations remained steady, In 2017, the Humanist Society Scotland commissioned a survey of Scottish residents 16 years and older, asking the question "Are you religious?" Of the 1,016 respondents, 72.4% responded no, 23.6% said yes, and 4% did not answer.

Church attendance has also declined, with two-thirds of people living in Scotland saying they "never or practically never" attend services, compared with 49% when the survey began. Since 2016, humanists in Scotland have conducted more marriages each year than the Church of Scotland (or any other religious denomination).

== See also ==
- List of churches in Scotland
- Freedom of religion in Scotland
- Religion in the United Kingdom
