= The Cauldron =

The Cauldron was a non-profit, independent, esoteric magazine featuring in-depth articles on traditional witchcraft, Wicca, ancient and modern Paganism, magic, and folklore. It was published quarterly in the UK in February, May, August, and November between 1976 and 2015. It was founded to cater for pagan witches, giving space in particular to non-Gardnerian traditions of witchcraft and so provided some balance to The Wiccan (now Pagan Dawn), the mouthpiece of the Pagan Front (later the Pagan Federation). During its lifetime The Cauldron was edited by Michael Howard who "has been active among pagans and ritual magicians since the early 1960s".

Contributions have included: "The Leaves of Hekate – the Plant Lore of the Thessaly Witches" by Daniel A. Schulke, "Land Guardianship" by Sarah Lawless, "Traditional Fairy Lore" by Ronald Hutton.

== See also ==
- Pagan Dawn, journal of the Pagan Federation
- The Pomegranate, international journal of Pagan Studies
- Quest, quarterly esoteric magazine
