= Quest (esoteric magazine) =

British esoteric magazine

Quest is an esoteric quarterly magazine containing material on magic, witchcraft, and practical occultism, along with personal experiences and reviews. It has been edited since its inception in 1970 by the author Marian Green, who also organises an associated annual Quest Conference.

Its 169th issue was published in March 2012 and included articles by herbalist author Val Thomas, editor of The Cauldron Mike Howard, and Diana Demdike, an early collaborator of Green.

== Quest Conference ==
As of 2022, the Quest Conference is held every year since 1968. It's an annual gathering of pagan practitioners, authors and interested newcomers in the Bristol area of the UK. It is organised by Marian Green, editor of Quest and the author of over twenty books on witchcraft, magic and the Western Mysteries.

The meetings were initially held in London, and in 1983 attracted about 100 people to a venue in Russell Square. The 2012 meeting was held at the Southville Centre in Bristol, and included talks by medieval historian Karen Ralls on Roslyn Chapel, and herbalist Val Thomas on creating a magical garden. The 2013 meeting was also held at the Southville Centre and included talks by Rae Beth on witchcraft and the otherworld and Philip West on the pagan roots of the Old Testament.
