= Modern paganism in the United Kingdom =

Movement of modern paganism in the UK

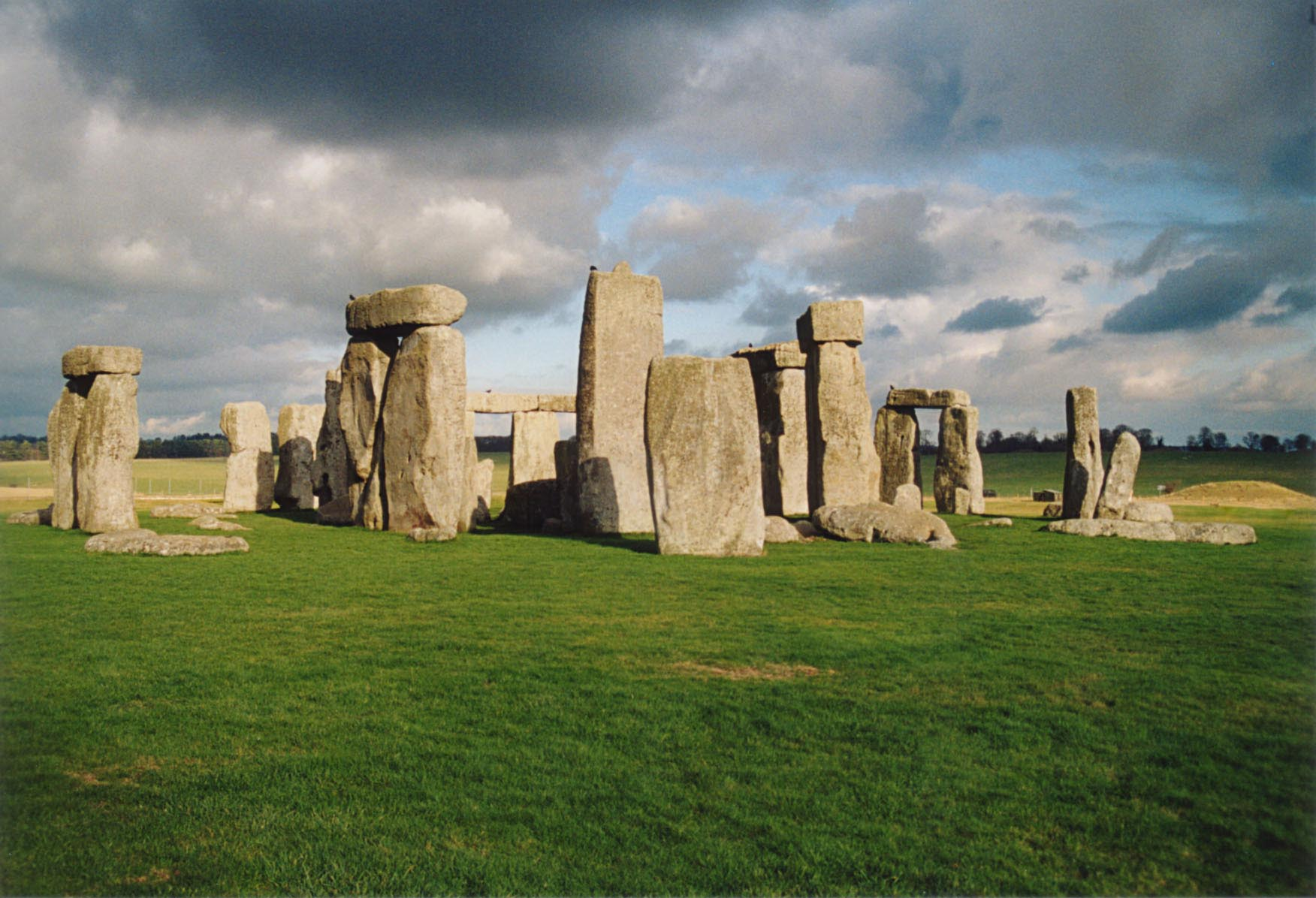
- Stonehenge is an important part of certain modern neo-druidic practices.

Total population
- United Kingdom: 126,980 – 0.2% (2021/22 Census) (Note: Includes all followers who are followers of the broad Modern Paganism movement, i.e. not just Modern paganism.)): Paganism – 93,686; Wicca – 13,056; Shamanism – 7,904

Regions with significant populations
- England: 99,500 – 0.2% (2021)
- Scotland: 19,113 – 0.4% (2022) (Note: Only includes those identified as followers of Paganism, does not include other faiths in the broader Modern Paganism movement)
- Wales: 7,033 – 0.2% (2021)
- Northern Ireland: 1,334 – 0.1% (2021)

Religions
- Also includes Heathenry, Druidy, Pantheism, Witchcraft, Animism and Reconstructionist

Related ethnic groups
- Modern paganism in Ireland

The Modern Pagan movement in the United Kingdom is primarily represented by Wicca and Neopagan witchcraft, Druidry, and Heathenry: 74,631 people in England, Scotland, and Wales identified as either as Pagan or a member of a specific Modern Pagan group in the 2011 UK Census.

== Demographics ==
A study conducted by Ronald Hutton compared a number of different sources (including membership lists of major organisations within the United Kingdom, major events attendance, subscriptions to magazines, etc.), and used standard models for calculating likely numbers of Pagans within the United Kingdom. This estimate accounted for multiple membership overlaps as well as the number of adherents represented by each attendee of a Pagan gathering. Hutton estimated that there are 250,000 Pagan adherents in the United Kingdom, roughly equivalent to the national Hindu community back in 2001 when it was much smaller than it is today (there are presently over a million Hindus in the United Kingdom).

A smaller number is suggested by the results of the 2001 Census, in which a question about religious affiliation was asked for the first time. Respondents were able to write in an affiliation not covered by the check-list of common religions, and a total of 42,262 people from England, Scotland, and Wales declared themselves to be Pagans by this method (or 23% of the 179,000 adherents of "other religions" in the results). These figures were not released as a matter of course by the Office for National Statistics, but were released after an application filed by the Pagan Federation (Scottish branch). With a population of around 59 million, this gives a rough proportion of 7 Pagans per 10,000 inhabitants of the United Kingdom.

The 2001 UK Census figures did not allow an accurate breakdown of traditions within the Pagan heading, as a campaign by the Pagan Federation before the census encouraged Wiccans, Heathens, Druids and others all to use the same write-in term 'Pagan' in order to maximise the numbers reported. The 2011 census however made it possible to describe oneself as Pagan-Wiccan, Pagan-Druid and so on. The figures for England, Wales and Scotland are as follows:

Description	England	Wales	Scotland
Pagan	53,172	3,448	3,467
Wicca	11,026	740	949
Druid	3,946	243	245
Pantheism	2,105	111	135
Heathen	1,867	91	150
Witchcraft	1,193	83	81
Shamanism	612	38	92
Animism	487	54	44
Reconstructionist	223	28	31
Total	74,631	4,836	5,194

The overall numbers of people reporting Pagan or one of the other categories in the table above rose between 2001 and 2011. In 2001 about seven people per 10,000 UK respondents identified as pagan; in 2011 the number (based on the England and Wales population) was 14.3 people per 10,000 respondents.

Research conducted by Dr Leo Ruickbie suggested that the south-east of England had the highest concentration of Pagans in the country.

=== 2021 census ===
Pagan movement	England (2021)	Scotland (2022)	Wales (2021)	Northern Ireland (2021)	United Kingdom (2021/22) (Note: Excluding Scotland, with the exception of the Pagan religious group where 2022 census data is available.)
Pagan	68,629	19,113	5,104	840	93,686
Wicca	11,946	To be published, only 2011 figures available	867	243	13,056
Shamanism	7,624	To be published, only 2011 figures available	265	15	7,904
Heathenry	4,478	To be published, only 2011 figures available	243	70	4,791
Druidry	2,268	To be published, only 2011 figures available	222	37	2,527
Pantheism	2,158	To be published, only 2011 figures available	141	81	2,380
Witchcraft	967	To be published, only 2011 figures available	77	0	1,044
Animism	733	To be published, only 2011 figures available	69	48	850
Reconstructionist	697	To be published, only 2011 figures available	45	0	742
Total	99,500	TBC	7,033	1,334	126,980

== Religions ==
Modern Paganism in the UK is dominated by Wicca, the modern movement of Druidry, and forms of Heathenry.

=== Wicca ===
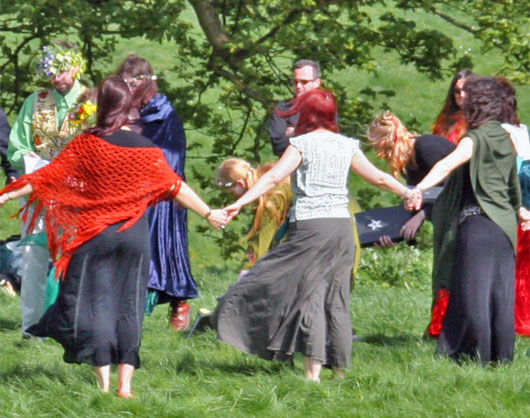
Wiccans gather for a handfasting ceremony at Avebury in England.

Wicca was developed in England in the first half of the 20th century. It is generally a duotheistic religion which worships the Horned God and Moon Goddess. Although it had various terms in the past, from the 1960s onward the name of the religion was normalised to Wicca.

=== Heathenry ===
Heathenry consists of a variety of modern movements attempting to revive Germanic paganism, such as that practiced in the British Isles by the Anglo-Saxon and Scandinavian peoples prior to Christianisation. Asatru UK was founded in 2013 and operates as a country-wide group for all inclusive Heathens.

=== Druidism ===
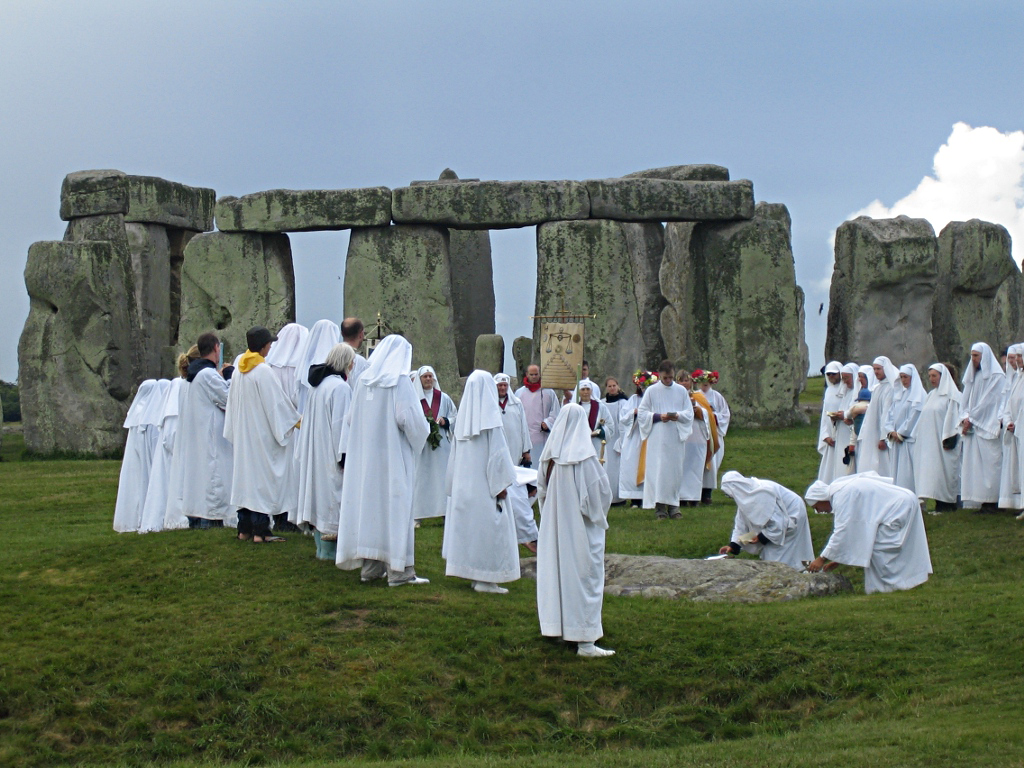
Druids' ritual at Stonehenge.

During the Iron Age, Celtic polytheism was the predominant religion in the area now known as England. Neo-Druidism grew out of the Celtic revival in 18th century Romanticism. Its first organised group was the Ancient Order of Druids, founded in London in 1781 along Masonic lines as a mutual benefit society and still extant today. It is not a neo-Pagan group. It was followed in 1792 by the Gorsedd of Bards of the Isle of Britain, also founded in London. This was the brainchild of Welsh stonemason, student of Welsh language, culture and heritage, and literary forger, Edward Williams, better known by his assumed name, Iolo Morganwg. It also survives to this day, its rituals forming an important part of the annual Welsh National Eisteddfod. Its members included Queen Elizabeth II and former archbishop of Canterbury, Rowan Williams. It is a cultural institution, not a neo-Pagan one. Inasmuch as it has a religious element, that element is Christian. The Ancient Druid Order, founded circa 1909, was the first that could be characterised as neo-Pagan, its founder being influenced by the occult movement of the late 19th century. The Order of Bards, Ovates and Druids, which split from the Ancient Druid Order in 1964, began to develop a more neo-Pagan style of Druidry, partly through the friendship between its founder, Ross Nichols, and the founder of modern Wicca, Gerald Gardner. More overtly Pagan Druid groups began to develop in the UK from the late 1970s onwards. These include the British Druid Order, The Druid Network and numerous other smaller groups.

=== Reconstructionist Roman religion ===
The revival of the Reconstructionist Roman religion (Latin: Religio Romana), also known as Roman Neopaganism, in the United Kingdom focuses on the modern restoration of ancient Roman spiritual practices, virtues, and rituals. Unlike broader Wicca or eclectic Neopaganism, this movement is strictly reconstructionist, prioritising the study of historical Latin texts and archaeological evidence to recreate the Cultus Deorum (worship of the gods) as accurately as possible.

The history of organised Roman reconstructionism in Britain gained momentum in the late 20th century alongside the wider growth of contemporary Pagan movements and reconstructionist traditions in Europe and North America. International organisations such as Nova Roma have contributed to the development and visibility of Roman reconstructionist practice in Europe since this period.

The movement in the UK is characterised by a dual focus on sacra privata—the domestic worship of the Lares (household spirits) and Manes (ancestors)—and the public observance of the ancient Roman calendar, such as Saturnalia, Lupercalia, and the Liberalia.

== Organisations ==
Modern Pagan organisations in Great Britain:

- Heathenry
  - Asatru UK (since 2013)
  - Odinist Fellowship (since 1988)
  - Odinic Rite (since 1973)
- Neo-druidism in Britain
  - British Druid Order
  - The Druid Network
  - The Druid Order
  - Order of Bards, Ovates and Druids
  - Secular Order of Druids
- Reconstructionist Roman religion
  - Nova Roma
- Other
  - Children of Artemis
  - Pagan Dawn (magazine, since 1968)
  - Pagan Federation (since 1971)
  - Quest Conference
  - Unitarian Earth Spirit Network (since 1990)
  - Scottish Pagan Federation

== See also ==
- British Traditional Wicca
- New Age travellers
- The Pagan Review
- Religion in the United Kingdom
