= Neo-paganism in the Republic of Ireland =

Many neo-pagan religions such as Wicca, Druidry and Celtic polytheism have active followings in Ireland, although the number of declared adherents is likely quite small. It has been claimed to be the fastest growing religion in Ireland.

== Early history ==
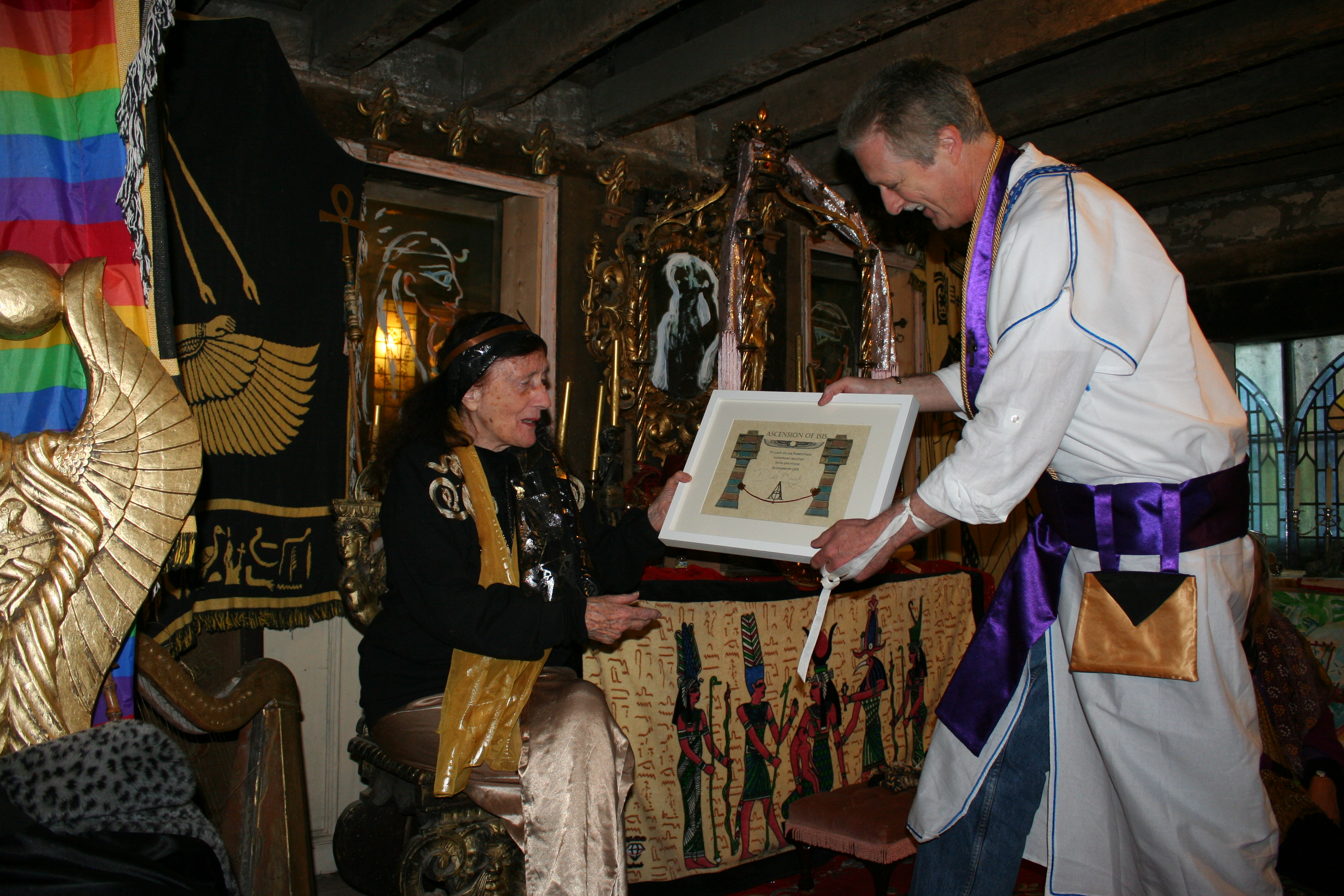
Lady Olivia Robertson, at the Temple of Isis, 2011

One of the first openly pagan organisations in Ireland was the Fellowship of Isis. Founded in Clonegal, Wexford, in 1976 by Olivia Robertson, her brother Lawrence and his wife, it has been continuously running since and claims 20–30,000 followers worldwide.

Stewart Farrar was one of the earliest initiates into Alexandrian Wicca, being initiated in 1970. He and his wife Janet moved to Ireland in 1976 to escape the bustle of London, finally settling in Kells, County Meath and establishing their own coven – likely one of the first in Ireland.

Prior to 1990, Neo-pagan groups in Ireland tended to be regarded as eccentrics; however since then their profile has risen considerably. This is due to several reasons. The decline in influence of the Catholic church has prompted many to explore other belief systems. Discoveries of previously unknown astronomical alignments at stone circles, mountains and burial sites have indicated that the ancient Irish were more technologically advanced than previously thought.

In 1995, the first Irish pagan website, Pagan Ireland, was created by Bev and Del Richardson, who also went on to set up a school of Paganism in Doneraile, Co. Cork. With permission to use the name given by Bev and Del Richardson, Pagan Ireland magazine was begun by Luke Eastwood in 2021, also resurrecting the website name.

Extensive road and motorway development since the mid-1990s has endangered several Celtic heritage sites, and Neo-pagan groups have frequently been involved in protests against these works. The highest-profile protests were against the proposed M3 motorway, which cuts through the Tara-Skryne or Gabhra valley in County Meath and close to the Hill of Tara, the traditional seat of the High Kings of Ireland. Druidic groups in particular have been heavily involved in protesting the motorway's development.

== Rights and national recognition ==
In 2010, after a 5-year campaign and having previously been rejected by the Department of Social Protection, Pagan Federation Ireland achieved a notable victory when their campaigning resulted in Pagan celebrants winning the right to conduct legally-binding Pagan weddings. Pagan celebrants can gain their licence to conduct such weddings in a variety of ways, the two most common being through membership and certification through Pagan Federation Ireland, or membership and certification through an organisation known as Pagan Life Rites. As of 2023, there are at least twenty registered Pagan or Druid solemnisers registered with the General Register Office.

== Wicca in Ireland ==
A number of Wiccan temples and covens exist in Ireland. In 2002, the Irish Examiner claimed that there are an estimated 3,500 practicing witches in Ireland, up from 3,000 two years previously, and 300 in 1992.

Teampall Na Calliaghe based in Kells, County Meath is run by Janet Farrar and Gavin Bone; who have also published a number of books on Wicca.

Author Lora O'Brien, who has published works specifically dealing with witchcraft in Ireland is not involved in Wicca anymore, but now runs a monthly moot (a social and networking meeting) in County Waterford. Lora also runs the Irish Pagan school, which is platform that represents a wide range of native Irish Pagan teachers. Much of the content is provided free.

== Druidry in Ireland ==
There are a number of well-established Druidic groups in Ireland:

- The Irish College of Druids
- Celtic Druid Temple, formerly known as 'Ireland's Druid School' based in Castlerea, County Roscommon represents "a spiritual path connecting the three realms and the three cauldrons with natural time and may not be seen as a religion"

Eimear Burke, who in 2020 took up the role of Chosen chief of OBOD (The Order of Bards, Ovates and Druids) resides in Kilkenny, and runs The Kilkenny Druid Grove.

The Irish Druid Network website is a useful source for news and maintains a comprehensive list of Druidic schools, groves and other resources, founded by Luke Eastwood, initially assisted by Wil Kinghan.

== Neo-Pagan events in Ireland ==
The Eigse Spiorad Cheilteach (Celtic Spirit Festival) has been held every year since 2007 (except for a break due to Covid-19), and features speakers, rituals and a night Court (an open space for sharing poetry, song and other creative works). Founded by Luke Eastwood, who ran it for 6 years, it is now under the stewardship of Anna Ní Cút, Paul O'Corcoran and Eimear Burke.

There is an annual Samhain celebration performed at the Hill of Tlachtga, near Athboy in Co. Meath, commenced by Janet Farrar and Gavin Bone, on 31 October, where hundreds of Irish pagans gather to celebrate the turn of the year, which eventually became more formalized. Founded in 2019 by Fáilte Ireland, the Púca Festival is now an annual event celebrating Samhain from 31 October to 2 November each year. It has drawn some complaints from some Catholic organisations.

== See also ==
- Neopaganism in the United Kingdom
