= Pagan Dawn =

British magazine

Pagan Dawn is a quarterly magazine featuring articles, reviews and research on polytheism, pantheism, cultural history, and nature-based spirituality published by the Pagan Federation in the United Kingdom. Founded in 1968—three years prior to the forming of the Pagan Federation—as The Wiccan, the name was changed in 1994 "to reflect the growing number of non-Wiccan members of the Pagan Federation".

Pagan Dawn is based in London. Articles cover all aspects of modern and historic paganism, from Germanic neopaganism to wicca, shamanism, druidry, and esoterica. The magazine also includes news and announcements of workshops, conferences, moots, festivals, training, groups, publications, and related information.
