= Pagan Federation =

Religious advocacy group in England

- Pagan Federation logo
- Abbreviation: CAW
- Formation: c. 1971
- Type: Religious organization
- Headquarters: London, England
- Location: United Kingdom
- Members: 2,500+

The Pagan Federation is a UK-based religious advocacy group. Formed in 1971 as the Pagan Front, the organisation campaigns for the religious rights of Neo-Pagans and aims to educate both civic bodies and the general public. It is a constituted voluntary organisation registered with Companies House as a private company limited by guarantee. On 22 August 2000, it was granted an exemption from using the word 'Limited' in its name, with its nature of business listed as a religious organisation. The organisation announced in April 2024 that it had been given charity status.

== Publication ==
The Pagan Federation publishes the quarterly magazine Pagan Dawn, featuring articles, reviews, and research on both modern and historic Paganism.

== Beliefs ==
The Pagan Federation believes that Paganism is the ancestral religion of the whole of humanity. According to the organisation, for a person to be pagan, they only need to believe the following:

- Each person has a right to follow his or her own path, as long as it harms no one.
- There is a higher power (or powers).
- Nature is to be venerated.

== See also ==
- Modern paganism in the United Kingdom
