= Ellinais =

Hellenic neopagan religious organization based in Greece

Ellinais (Greek: Ελληναίς or ΕΛΛΗΝ.Α.Ι.Σ.), also known as The Holy Association of Greek Ancient Religion Believers (Ελλήνων Αρχαιοθρήσκων Ιερόν Σωματείον), is an Athens-based religious organization intended to promote the spread of Hellenismos, the modern worship of the ancient Greek gods. Ellinais was founded in 2005 and has over 30 official members; including academics, lawyers and other professionals. The group has received state recognition of the religion. It is demanding that its offices be registered as places of worship, which could allow the group to perform weddings and other rites. The group believes in world peace, ecological awareness, and the right to education. The group has three high priests, one of whom is Kostas Stathopoulos.

== 2007 Temple of Olympian Zeus rite ==
On 22 January 2007 Ellinais held the first known ceremony of its kind at the 1,800-year-old Temple of Olympian Zeus since the ancient Greek religion was outlawed by the Christian Roman Empire in the late 4th century. In defiance of a government ban, the 90-minute event included hymns, dancers and torchbearers. Worshipers, dressed in ancient costume, recited ancient hymns calling on Zeus, "King of the Gods and the mover of things", to bring peace to the world. The priests celebrated the nuptials of Zeus with Hera, the goddess of love and marriage, below the imposing Corinthian-style columns in the city centre.

A herald holding a metal staff, topped with two snake heads, proclaimed the beginning of the ceremony before priests in blue and red chitons, or robes, released two white doves, symbols of peace. A priest then poured libations of wine and incense burned on a tiny copper tripod while a choir of men and women chanted ancient hymns under the watchful eye of "guards", dressed as ancient Greek hoplites, or soldiers.

== See also ==
- Hellenistic religion
- Persecution of ancient Greek religion
- Religion in ancient Greece
- Supreme Council of Ethnikoi Hellenes
