= Hellenism (modern religion) =

Modern religion derived from ancient Greek pre-christian beliefs

The laurel wreath, the symbol used to identify Hellenism

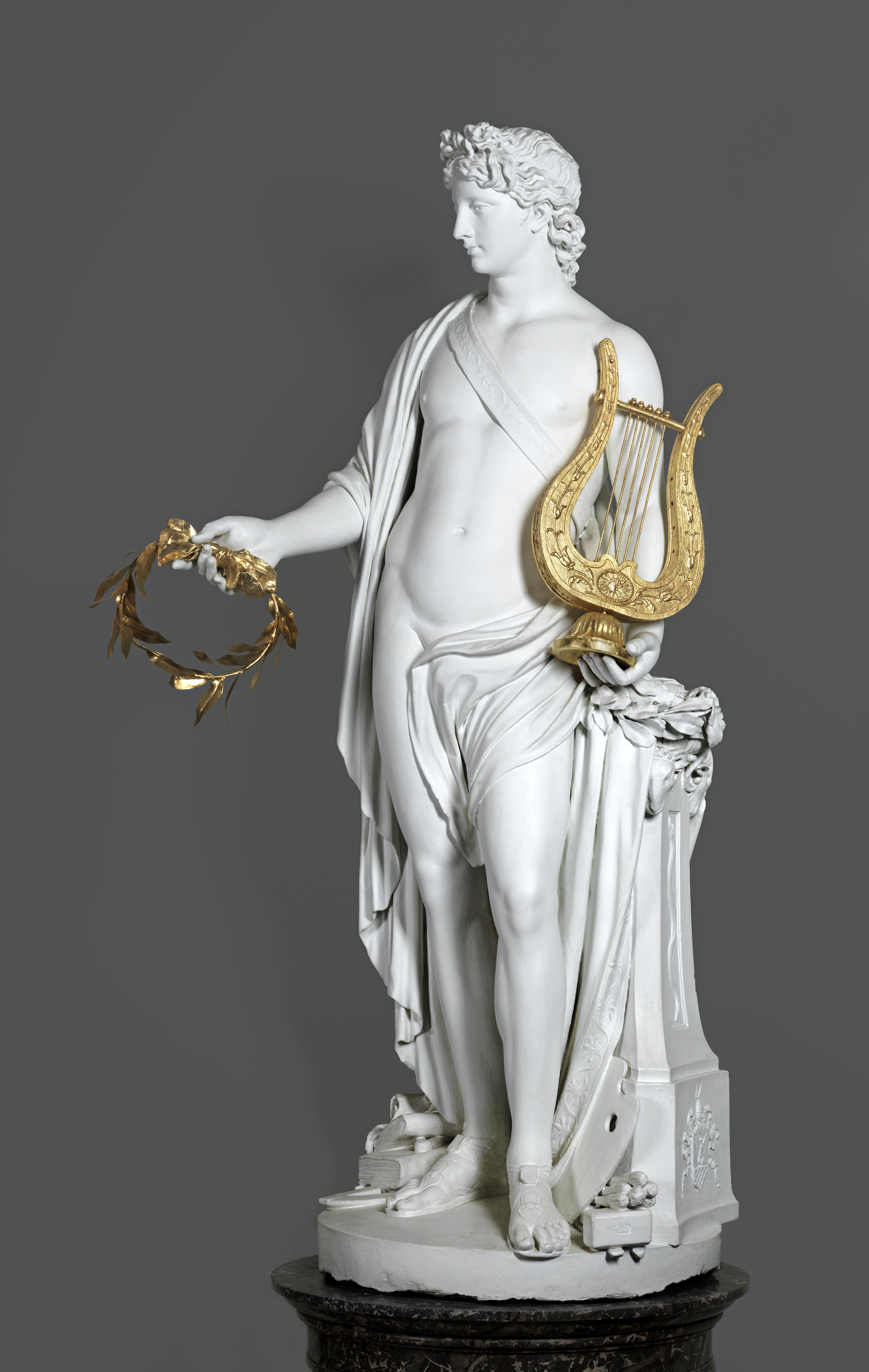
Greek god Apollo holding the laurel wreath

Hellenism (Greek: Ἑλληνισμός, romanized: Hellenismos), also known as Hellenic Polytheism, is a modern polytheistic neopagan religion based on ancient Greek religion. Its practitioners worship the Greek gods through prayer, offerings, household and public rituals, and annual festivals.

Hellenism encompasses a diverse range of theological and philosophical views, whilst emphasizing values such as Eusebeia (piety), Arete (virtue), and Xenia (hospitality).

The modern revival of Hellenism began in the 20th century, with organized movements emerging in Greece during the 1990s. Whereas many practitioners describe Hellenism as the continuation or revival of an enduring religious tradition, most historians regard it as a modern reconstruction of ancient Greek religion. The religion is currently practised internationally by a variety of organizations and independent communities. In 2017, Hellenism was legally recognized as a "known religion" in Greece, permitting it to establish places of worship and its clergy to officiate at marriages.

== Naming and terminology ==
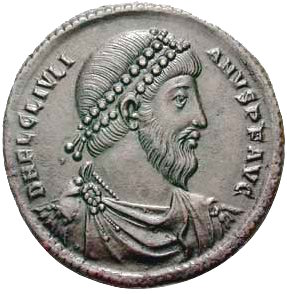
Emperor Julian the Philosopher

Hellenism (Ἑλληνισμός) has been historically used to refer to paganism since the time of Emperor Julian the Philosopher in the 4th Century CE, who may have been the first to use the term in a letter to Arsacius, High-priest of Galatia:

"The Hellenic religion does not yet prosper as I desire, and it is the fault of those who profess it; for the worship of the gods is on a splendid and magnificent scale, surpassing every prayer and every hope."

— Emperor Julian, translated by Wilmer C. Wright

In the original Greek:

Ὁ Ἑλληνισμὸς οὔπω πράττει κατὰ λόγον ἡμῶν ἕνεκα τῶν μετιόντων αὐτόν· τὰ γὰρ τῶν θεῶν λαμπρὰ καὶ μεγάλα, κρείττονα πάσης μὲν εὐχῆς, πάσης δὲ ἐλπίδος.

From this, some followers use the term Hellenism or Hellenismos as a religious label in homage to Emperor Julian. In a 2018 lecture, Vlassis G. Rassias defined Hellenism as being beyond religious simplification, explaining it to be the Hellenic "way of life", or "worldview".

The phrase "Hellenic polytheistic reconstructionism" is used to refer to a methodology used by some practitioners in which Hellenism should be created/recreated based on academic sources, rather than the religion itself. Other organizations, such as Dodekatheon (Δωδεκάθεον), the Helliniki Hetaireia Archaiophilon (Societas Hellenica Antiquariorum), and the Thyrsos (Θύρσος) use a combination of terms interchangeably, including "elliniki thriskia" ("ἑλληνικὴ θρησκεία", "Hellenic religion"), "Hellenic polytheistic religion", and "Hellenism".

Other terms in common usage by Hellenists include "Greek reconstructionism" and "Hellenic Traditionalism", but the two are not synonymous. The American group Elaion uses the term "Dodekatheism" (Greek: δώδεκα, dodeka, "twelve" + θεϊσμός, theïsmós, "belief in the gods") to describe its approach to the Hellenic religion, stating that the term: "has been used for some time within and outside Greece to refer to ancient Greek religion and we feel that it is important for those of us outside Greece share a common name and identity with our co-religionists in the homeland of our spirituality", and believes that the term 'Hellenism' is too closely linked to the usage by the modern Greek nation.

== Theology and values ==
There is debate between followers of Hellenism over the inclusion of theology. Some argue that theology must be included due to it being important to both ancient tradition and ancient philosophy. YSEE have published materials about the ancient Greek religion that have included sections on theology and praxis, but without specific references to philosophers or philosophical movements.

Others disagree on the centrality of theology. They argue that Hellenism's lack of dogmas or holy books means that theology only relates to philosophical movements. This means that at the community level, they reject any association with specific philosophical paths. Individuals may associate but it should not be endorsed by a group or the community, similar to monotheistic religions. Therefore, those against theology's inclusion consider the rituals to be based on mythology, with myths forming the basis of their festivals.

This perspective does not mean that members of a community or the broader Hellenic following can do whatever they please. There are certain principles, rooted in tradition, that members must follow. As one follower stated, "you can't be dogmatic in our circles, because we don't have a dogma [laughing], ... there are of course some guiding principles that one needs to follow because they are based on tradition, these are things that you need to follow." In some cases, values are openly stated in the group's texts:

The values that govern and guide Labrys religious community are: Eusebia (Piety), in our relationship with the Gods; Organikotis (Kinship), in our relationships within the Community; Dikaiosyne (Justice), in terms of members' relations within the Community and also as a guiding principle in the conduct of the community as a whole towards third parties. The members of Labrys religious community also aim at achieving Eudaimonia [happiness] through attaining freedom, autonomy and self-sufficiency.

While there are certain values that are held in common within the community and are expected to be accepted by followers, this does not apply to theological or philosophical beliefs. As one member stated, "it doesn't matter if you have read Homer or Hesiod. The most important is piety. To be possessed by Gods and be pious is the A and Z." Most members consider piety one of the most important values in life to follow.

Prominent concepts in Hellenism include, but are not limited to: Eusebeia (piety), Arete (virtue), and Xenia (hospitality). These are rooted in various concepts taken from ancient Greek values that are looked to for guidance and inspiration and taken from various texts including the Tenets of Solon, the Delphic maxims, the Golden verses of Pythagoras, Epicurean philosophy, the ethics of Aristotle, Stoic philosophy among others.

=== Eusebeia ===
Eusebeia (Εὐσέβεια) is often translated as "piety" or "reverent conduct" (towards gods or parents), "reverence", "respect". Eusebeia is the basic practice of Hellenic Religion, and is fundamental in every way. Eusebeia is the attitude and practice of showing respect and reverence to the Gods and parents. The Delphic Maxims say "Follow God" (Έπου θεώ), "Worship the Gods" (Θεούς σέβου), and "Respect Your Parents" (Γονείς αίδου).

=== Arete ===
Arete (Ἀρετή) is often translated as "excellence" or "moral virtue". Arete is intrinsic to the concept of living up to one's potential. For modern Hellenists, arete is one of the most important virtues, and it is believed that cultivating it will lead to a good life of happiness and prosperity. Cultivating arete is not limited to just one domain, but also refers to the improvement of all aspects of one's existence.

In Homer's Iliad and Odyssey, "arete" is used mainly to describe heroes and nobles in reference to their mobile dexterity, strength, or courage, but it is not limited to this. Penelope's arete, for example, relates to co-operation, for which she is praised by Agamemnon. The excellence of the gods generally included their power, but, in the Odyssey (13.42), the gods can grant excellence to a life, which is contextually understood to mean prosperity.

=== Xenia ===
Xenia (Ξενία) is the concept of hospitality and is sometimes translated as "guest-friendship" or "ritualized friendship". It is an institutionalized relationship, rooted in generosity, gift exchange, and reciprocity; fundamental aspects of xenia. Historically, hospitality towards foreigners (Hellenes not of one's polis) and guests was a moral obligation. Hospitality towards foreign Hellenes honored Zeus Xenios (and Athene Xenia), patrons of foreigners. In aristocratic circles, as early as the Homeric epics, it was treated as a sort of fictitious kinship, cemented not only by ties of hospitality and gift exchange but by an obligation to promote the interests of the xenos. Theoxenia is a theme in Greek mythology in which human beings demonstrate their virtue or piety by extending hospitality to a humble stranger (xenos), who turns out to be a disguised deity (theos) with the capacity to bestow rewards.

=== Offerings and rituals ===
Offerings and libations are considered sacred integral acts within worship. There are several types of offerings that are performed, sacrifices, votive offerings, and libations.

Without sacrifices, prayers are words only; but accompanied with sacrifices they become animated words; and words indeed corroborating life.

— Sallustius

Devotees are divided upon the question of animal sacrifice. Some are fine with the practice, while others do not engage in the practice at all. Some instead offer symbolic food of the animal that is sacrificed instead of the animal, often though not exclusively fruit, bread, or cakes. Worship generally takes the form of prayer, offerings, and setting up altars. Altars serve as the sacred place and focal point of worship to one or more given deities, where offerings and prayers are made to the gods.

== Beliefs ==
Hellenism is a pluralistic religion similar to its historical counterpart. The religion holds beliefs ranging between polytheism, animism and monism, but they are not mutually exclusive and one may hold beliefs that fall into some or all of these categories. Additionally, there are other interpretations of divinity in line with Hellenistic philosophies, like Epicureanism.

Devotees worship the Greek gods, which includes the Twelve Olympians, divinities and spirits of nature (e.g. nymphs), underworld deities (the chthonic gods) and heroes. Both physical and spiritual ancestors are greatly honored. The gods exhibit both universal and local qualities. For the Greeks, "their gods were at the same time universal, found everywhere and powerful over the whole world, and intensely local, manifesting themselves in particular places."

Some Hellenists may also enrich their beliefs through metaphysical schools or frameworks of Ancient Greece and the Hellenistic world with developed cosmological systems. Amongst the most prominent of these schools are neoplatonism and stoicism.

Although Hellenism is heavily based on the myths, most practitioners do not believe the myths as being literal (or that they are a watered-down or heavily changed version of true events). Instead, they see the myths as sacred stories with meaning and high learning value.

== Festivals ==
There are many festivals throughout the year that many seek to celebrate, where the dates are often set by the lunisolar Attic calendar. The festivals typically commemorate events in Greek history, honoring deities that the festivals celebrate, and connote spiritual themes. The celebrations incorporate religious themes, arts, sacrifices and offerings, family get togethers and feasts. Popular sacred days are Deipnon, Noumenia and Agathos Daimon.

Hellenic festivals include:

- Anthesteria
- Lenaia
- Dionysia
- Thargelia
- Arrephoria
- Kronia
- Aphrodisia
- Panathanaia
- Herakleia
- Genesia
- Pyanepsia
- Thesmophoria
- Khalkeia
- Rural Dionysia
- Haloa
- Elaphebolia
- City Dionysia

== Relationship to ancient Greek religion ==
The majority of modern historians agree that the religion practiced by the ancient Greeks had been extinguished by the 9th century AD at the latest and that there is no evidence that it survived past the Middle Ages. (In certain isolated areas it survived until the 12th century; see Tsakonia and Maniots.) Greek Dodecatheon member Panagiotis Marinis has claimed that the religion of ancient Greece survived throughout the intervening centuries, and some claim they were raised in families that practiced this religion.

The revival of Hellenic religious identity is typically only part of a larger social movement of re-Hellenizing Greek identity in a comprehensive way, not only religious. This re-Hellenization movement is the current iteration of previous attempts to revive Hellenism. The first to promote such efforts was the late Byzantine philosopher Georgios Gemistus Plethon in the 15th century. It was in Mystras, in the Despotate of the Morea, that Plethon formed a 'circle' of students. It is through Plethon and his students that many ethnic Greeks today trace their teachings and practices and give credit for tradition's survival to the present day.

Two notable students of Plethon include the historian Laonikos Chalkokondyles and Bessarion. Bessarion, educated in Neoplatonism, was considered for the Catholic papacy twice. In a letter recounting the news of his teacher's death, Bessarion says that Plethon has left to "dance with the Olympian Gods" (να χορέψει μαζί με τους Ολυμπίους Θεούς) and honors Plethon by claiming him to be the reincarnation of Plato based on the "teachings of the Pythagoreans and Plato about the endless ascent and descent of souls" (διδαχές των Πυθαγορείων και του Πλάτωνα περί ατέλειωτης ανόδου και καθόδου των ψυχών).

In 1458, just a few years after the death of Plethon, Michael Tarchaniota Marullus was born near the site of ancient Sparta in the Despotate of the Morea or in Constantinople. Both of Marullus's parents were Greek exiles who had fled from Constantinople when it fell to the Turks in 1453, and he always proudly called himself a Greek. Marullus was a poet and stratioti-soldier. Among his works, Marullus composed a collection of hymns, the Hymni naturales, in which he celebrates the Olympian pantheon. Bartolomeo Scala, his father-in-law, was a member of the Platonic Academy in Florence, Italy.

So, my good king of the gods,
the gloomy fate, unfortunately, I could not escape,
to practice as a Hellene
the cult of my fathers
in a non-Hellenic language,
(Hymn to Hermes)

Validating the relationship between Hellenic ethnic religion and the ancient Greek religion for 'continuity' is difficult as an outsider to the tradition, argued Vlassis G. Rassias:

In the 19th century, many, especially German scholars, who were otherwise remarkable scholars, made the huge mistake of reconstructing a theology from the works of Homeros, who is only a poet. Hesiodos, on the other hand, who also engages in theogony, can also be seen as theology. But his works are not set in stone either. We see that when we look at Georgios Gemistos-Plethon, at the beginning of the 15th century who is the link between the ancients and us, and who demonstrates an underground continuation that has never been broken. In one of his invocations to Zeus, Plethon presents him – to the surprise of all who see things statically – as the father of Poseidon and Kronos. The German scholar of the 19th century or modern man, who doesn't even know what tradition means, begins at this point to muse and wonder over Plethon's words. In the end, many of them come to the crazy conclusion that Plethon must be assessed as a heretic.

Though when Plethon's presentation of Zeus as the 'father' of Poseidon and Kronos is compared to the Derveni papyrus (discovered in 1962), Plethon appears less the heretic. The Derveni Papyrus recounts an Orphic cosmology, one in which the world of today is Zeus' creation. The new order of the world arises from Zeus after he swallows the severed phallus, the last act in a series of overthrowings of the ruling figure. In doing this, Zeus contained all things within himself and remade the world and regenerated all the Gods and Goddess once more, being King and 'father' to all things. This aligns with the writings of Plethon. In the Book of Laws, Zeus "existed from all eternity", "not born of any other ... he is self-father [αὐτοπάτορα] ... has no other father than himself ... he is the father and the eldest creator [δημιουργὸν] of all things." The other gods in the Greek pantheon are divided according "to divine nature [θεότητι] into the second and third orders, the first of which are the children of Zeus, his creations, and the second are the children of his children, the creations of his creations."

Emically, the term “revival” is often used by practitioners to describe certain contemporary religious activities in Greece and internationally, particularly those involving organized group gatherings and public festival celebrations. Some figures associated with the modern Hellenic religious movement, including Vlassis Rassias, argued that such practices reflect a continuity of tradition, based on claims of transmitted knowledge and engagement with esoteric or initiatory sources. Etic perspectives, particularly from classical scholars and historians of religion, remain divided: some regard these contemporary practices as reconstructions or modern innovations and therefore question their historical authenticity, while others remain open to the possibility of partial continuity or the persistence of underlying cultural frameworks. British classicist Mary Beard criticized Greek Hellenist worshippers, saying, "until these eager neo-pagans get real and slaughter a bull or two in central Athens, I shan't worry that they have much to do with ancient religion at all", later commented that, "I think I was really responding to the claims made by this group that they were reviving ancient paganism. I am absolutely ok with the idea that religions change. I was reacting to their claims to be a modern version of ancient 'paganism'." American classicist, Sarah Iles Johnston affirmed contemporary practice. "The bricolage and re-imaginings of contemporary Pagans is not entirely different from that of ancient Greek religious culture and that even classical scholars inevitably re-imagine the gods." Revivalists view the tradition as a living, changing religion. Hellenic Revivalism allows room for practitioners to decide what feels right to them, and to adapt historical religious practices to modern life.

Hellenists and other self described pagans/polytheists typically engage in reconstructionism, a methodology that attempts to accurately base modern religious practice on the imitation of culturally and historically genuine examples of ancient religious practices. The term is frequently used in the United States to differentiate between syncretic and eclectic Neopagan movements, and those based on the traditions, writings, history, and mythology of a specific ancient polytheistic culture. The Supreme Council of Ethnic Hellenes have made a clear distinction between themselves and the Neopagan movements, and identify some 'Hellenic' groups as "simply disguised as 'Hellenes' for reasons that exist hidden within the depths of their own minds."

== History ==
=== 18th century ===
During the 18th century, several people adopted Ancient Greek religion to some extent, studying and translating ancient works of theology and philosophy, and in some cases composing original hymns and devotionals to the Ancient Greek pantheon. The English author John Fransham (1730–1810) was one example, considered an eccentric by his peers, who was also referred to as a pagan and a polytheist. In Fransham's 1769 book The Oestrum of Orpheus, he advanced a theology similar to that of the Neoplatonists: that the first cause of existence is uncreated and indestructible, but not intelligent, and that the universe is shaped by "innumerable intelligent powers or forces, 'plastic and designing', who ruled all sublunary affairs, and may most fitly be designated by the nomenclature of the Hellenic theology." Despite his apparent belief in the Hellenic gods, Fransham does not seem to have been particularly devoted to their worship. According to an 1875 profile in Fraser's Magazine, Fransham's "libations to the Penates found their way down his own throat, and when he sacrificed a fowl to 'Esculapius it was usually in the form of chicken-broth for his supper."

Another example of an 18th-century figure who may have considered himself a Hellenist was Thomas Taylor (1758–1835), who produced the first English translations of many neoplatonic philosophical and religious texts. Taylor was widely known as the "English Platonist", and rumors existed that he had produced anonymous pamphlets advocating a return to a sort of pagan religion (these rumors have been debunked by modern scholars). Though the extent of his actual devotion to Ancient Greek spirituality remains unknown, brief descriptions written by others about him tend to portray him as a sincerely devout polytheist. One such sketch, written by Isaac D'Israeli, describes Taylor delaying answering his door until he has finished his mid-day hymn to Apollo, and reports that his study contained a hanging globe of clear glass, representing Zeus, that scattered sunbeams he would use to read and write, shifting his position in the room to follow them throughout the day.

His work inspired a limited number of devotees. The most notable was Godefroi Izarn, the Marquis de Valadi, a young member of a wealthy French family who adopted a "Pythagorean mode of life". In 1788, Valadi traveled to England in order to convince an unnamed "gentleman of eminence in the literary world" to become the head of a new Pythagorean sect, assuring him that Valadi would help him find numerous followers. He refused and suggested Valadi learn Greek and become the head of the sect himself. Valadi began his studies at Glasgow, where he learned of Taylor, to whom he wrote in a letter:

My determination was to go and live in North America, and there to keep a school of temperance and love, in order to preserve so many men from the prevailing vices of brutal intemperance and selfish cupidity ... There I would devoutly erect altars to my favourite Gods: Dioscuri, Hector, Aristomenes, Pan, Orpheus, Epaminondas, Pythagoras, Pluto, Timoleon, Marcus Brutus and his Portia, and above all, Phoebus, the God of my hero Julian ...

Valadi paid Taylor to live in his house and study under him, but his tenure as Taylor's disciple was short lived. He returned to France to fight in the French Revolution in 1789 and he reportedly said, "I came over Diogenes. I am going back Alexander". He was executed by guillotine in December 1793 during the Reign of Terror.

=== 19th century ===
The literary and artistic movement known as Romanticism promoted notions of the masterless personal soul, a heightened regard for nature and an interest in supernatural themes, including both magic and Pagan, especially Classical Greek, religion. Many proponents of Romanticism wrote poems inspired by figures of Greek mythology. One example of this is found in the poem "The World Is Too Much with Us" written c. 1802 by William Wordsworth and first published in 1807 in his poetry collection Poems, in Two Volumes. In it, Wordsworth criticises the world of the early 19th century as materialistic and as removing itself from nature. Towards the end of the poem, Wordsworth wishes he was a pagan who believes in the Greek gods instead of a Christian even though he considers paganism outdated because he thinks that life would have more meaning that way. As Wordsworth himself put it:

Great God! I'd rather be
A Pagan suckled in a creed outworn;
So might I, standing on this pleasant lea,
Have glimpses that would make me less forlorn;
Have sight of Proteus rising from the sea;
Or hear old Triton blow his wreathèd horn.

— William Wordsworth, "The World Is Too Much with Us", lines 9–14

Another example is seen in the private letters that the poet Percy Bysshe Shelley and his friend Thomas Jefferson Hogg wrote to each other. In one letter written in 1821, Shelley wrote to Hogg:

I am glad that you do not neglect the rites of the true religion. Your letter awoke my sleeping devotions, and the same evening I ascended alone the high mountain behind my house, and suspended a garland, and raised a small turf altar to the mountain-walking Pan.

=== 20th century ===
In the early 20th century, several neopagan groups were formed, often incorporating elements of ancient Greek religion and honoring Greek gods, but with heavily syncretic elements drawn from Hermeticism and 19th century folklore studies. Most prominent of these modern traditions are Thelema and Wicca, though Feraferia (an American tradition founded in the 1970s by Fred Adams) places heavier emphasis on a more Hellenistic style of worship and on the Greco-Roman pantheon of gods. One Wiccan organization in the United States, the Aquarian Tabernacle Church, began to host a spring festival based on the Eleusinian Mysteries in 1985, which has continued to be held every year through the present day.

While not exactly a Hellenist, the sociologist and practicing Wiccan Margot Adler stated in her book on Wicca titled Drawing Down the Moon that when she was a child, she had a great interest in the Greek gods and goddesses and that she also devised her own rituals to perform in dedication to them. Many years later when Adler found out about Wicca, she converted to that religion because she felt that it confirmed her earlier childhood experiences, though Adler also notes that with regards to her conversion "I never converted in the accepted sense. I simply accepted, reaffirmed, and extended a very old experience."

During the 1970s, some began to reject the influence of Hermeticism and other heavily syncretic forms of Greek religion in preference of practices reconstructing earlier or more original forms of Hellenic worship. Early revivalists of Hellenic religion tended to be individuals working alone, and early attempts to organize adherents into larger groups failed. The first successful revival attempt was made by the Supreme Council of Ethnikoi Hellenes (or YSEE). In 1993, a variety of adherents to the Hellenic religion in Greece and elsewhere came together and began the process of organization. This resulted in a "Hellenic National Assembly", initiated at a gathering in southern Olympus on 9 September 1995. The process culminated with the formal establishment of the YSEE as a non-profit in Greece, in June 1997.

=== 21st century and official recognition ===
==== 2004 Olympics controversy ====
The 2004 Summer Olympics stirred up several disputes concerning Hellenic polytheistic religion.

- Professor Giorgos Dontas, president of the Archaeological Society of Athens expressed public outrage at the destruction of ancient archaeological sites around the Parthenon and Acropolis in preparation for the games.
- Prior to the Olympic Games, MSNBC correspondent Rehema Ellis, in a story called "It's Greek to Me: Group Tries to Restore Pagan Worship", documented the vandalism and arson of a bookstore in Athens which sold books promoting ancient Greek religion. She also interviewed several adherents who were upset about the current state of affairs in Greece. Ellis said: "A contrast in this place where the Olympic Games were created to honour Zeus – now those praying to the ancient gods are criticized for putting too much faith in the past."
- The Greek Society of the Friends of the Ancients objected to the commercial use of Athena and Phevos as the official mascots of the 2004 Summer Olympics held in Athens. They felt that the caricatured representations of the Greek gods Athena and Phoebus were disrespectful and culturally insensitive. In a BBC Radio interview on 26 June 2004, Dr. Pan. Marinis President of the Societas Hellenica Antiquariorum said that the mascots "mock the spiritual values of the Hellenic civilization by degrading these same holy personalities that were revered during the ancient Olympic Games. For these reasons we have proceeded to legal action demanding the punishment of those responsible."

==== Recognition and places of worship ====
In May 2006 an Athens court granted official recognition to the veneration of the Ancient Greek pantheon. Soon afterwards, on 22 January 2007, the Hellenist group Ellinais held a ceremony at the Temple of Olympian Zeus in Athens. It was the first such rite performed at the temple since the ancient Greek religion was outlawed by the Roman government in the late 4th century. The ceremony involved participants dressed as ancient warriors who left their swords and spears outside the sacred site, to represent the laying down of arms before the Olympic games. The BBC referred to the event as a show of "intentional publicity". The event caught the attention of the Greek Orthodox Church. Reporters at the event suggested the church might step up their opposition to the legitimizing of Hellenism. Father Eustathios Kollas, who presided over a community of Greek Orthodox priests, said: "They are a handful of miserable resuscitators of a degenerate dead religion who wish to return to the monstrous dark delusions of the past." Despite the 2006 court ruling, the Greek Ministry of Culture and Sports continued to disallow ceremonies of any kind at archaeological sites, and some early 21st century Hellenic rituals therefore took the form of protests. In August 2008, a group of adherents, again organized by Ellinais, gathered at the Acropolis both to give libations and other offerings to the goddess Athena, and to protest the removal of architectural pieces from the temples to a new museum at the site.

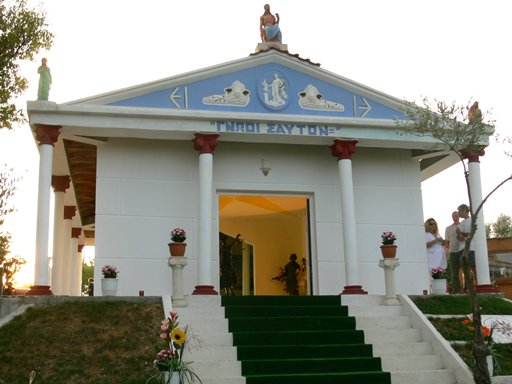
The Temple of the Hellenic Gods in Oraiokastro, Thessaloniki

The first modern Hellenic temple dedicated to the Hellenic gods was started in 1994 just outside Thessaloniki in the village of Oraiokastro and completed in 2009.

Another temple, dedicated to Alexander and Dionysus opened in the nearby village of Mesaio in 2019.

A third temple, and the first in the Peloponnese, dedicated to Zeus, Dionysus and Pan, opened in the village of Kalliani, Arcadia in 2025.

A modern Hellenic temple in Athens is still in the planning stages, and worshippers meet at a temporary temple at the headquarters of the Supreme Council of Ethnikoi Hellenes (YSEE) at an apartment building on Aristotelous street in central Athens.

== Organizations in Greece and demographics ==
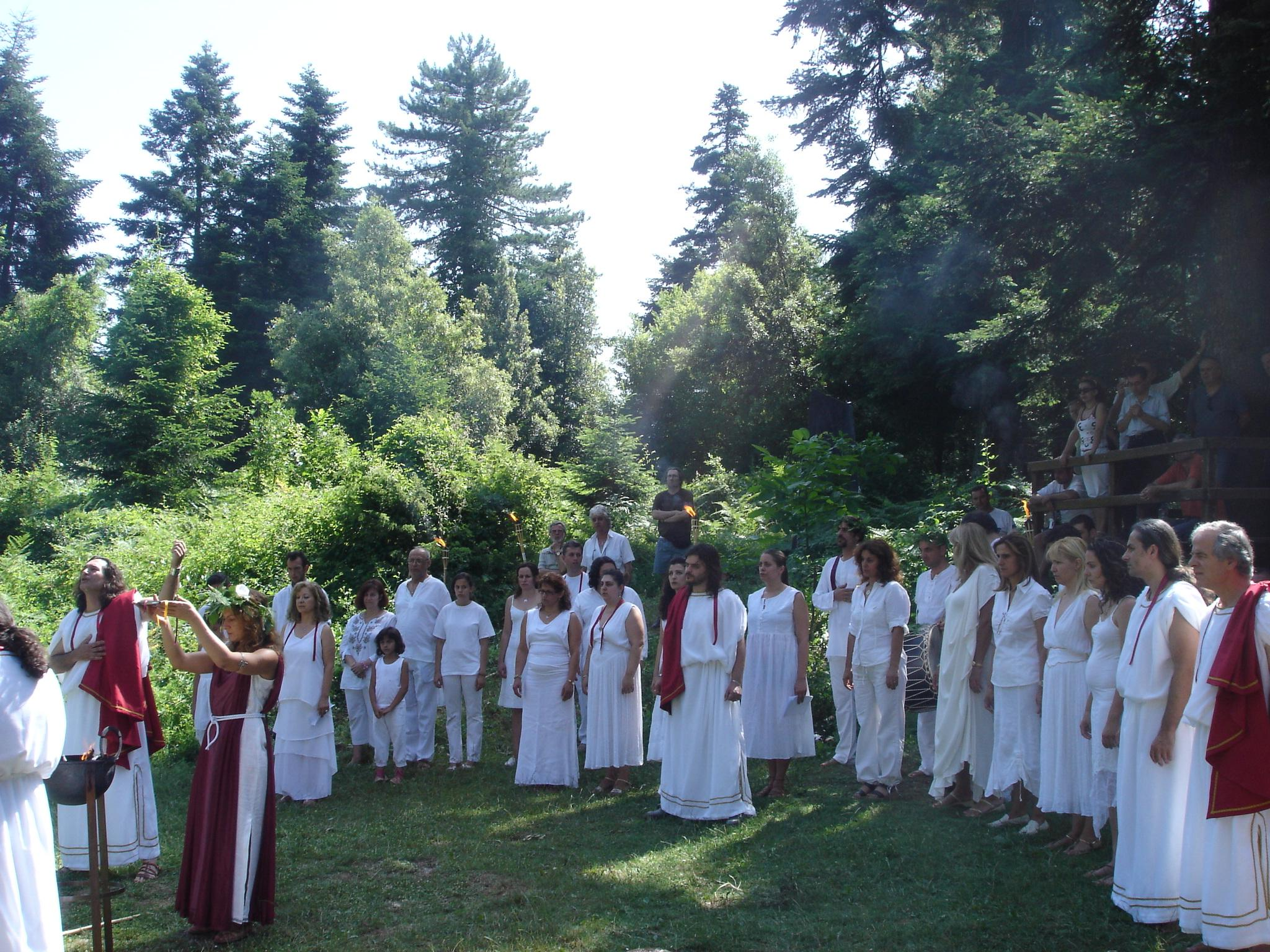
Ritual performed by members of the Supreme Council of Ethnikoi Hellenes

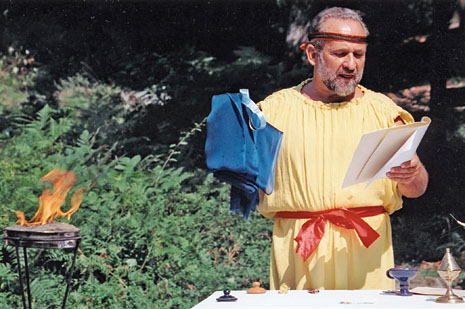
Hellenic priest performing ritual

The first Greek organization to openly support the religious revival of Hellenic religion was Ύπατο Συμβούλιο των Ελλήνων Εθνικών (Supreme Council of Ethnikoi Hellenes or YSEE), established in 1997, and is publicly active. YSEE is a founding member of the World Congress of Ethnic Religions (now European Congress of Ethnic Religions) and hosted the seventh annual WCER Congress in June 2004. With branches also in the United States, Canada, Australia, and Germany, their level of real world public activity, and actual membership levels, the Supreme Council of Ethnikoi Hellenes can be argued to be the defining lead organization for the public revival movement. YSEE is also a member of the European Union's action program to combat discrimination. The organization primarily refers to the religion as the "Ethnic Polytheistic" or "genuine Hellenism" and its practitioners as Ethnikoi Hellenes, "Ethnic [National] Hellenes". YSEE uses the terms "traditional", "ethnic", and "genuine" to refer to their religious practices. Hellenic polytheist author Vlassis G. Rassias has written a popular series of books, while the Athens-based group Ellinais emphasizes "world peace and the brotherhood of man".

Another active organization based in Greece, the Labrys (Λαβρύς, [lavˈris]) religious community was founded in 2008. Labrys has focused primarily on the religious aspects of Hellenism or Hellenic polytheism, establishing weekly public rituals and engaging in other aspects of practical promotion of polytheism like theater and music. Labrys has also promoted among Hellenes worldwide the need to actively practice household worship and the idea that family and community should be the starting points of religious practice. The community has been organizing since 2008 the largest festival in Athens and also actively participates and supports the religious aspects of the oldest Hellenic festival in Greece, Prometheia which is held every year on Mount Olympus. The Labrys religious community has published a book.

It is estimated that there are 2,000 to 5,000 devotees of the religion in Greece; however, an additional 100,000 to 200,000 people are said to have "some sort of interest".

== Other organizations ==
Founded in the United States in 2001, Hellenion identifies its practices as "Hellenic Pagan Reconstructionism" and emphasizes historical accuracy in its mission statement. Hellenion does not provide official membership numbers to the public, but an unofficial estimate of 43 members was made for 2007 and approximately 100 members for 2017. This number however can only give the roughest approximation, as Hellenion offers hardship waivers to those who cannot afford the typical membership fees. In early 2010, the organization reported 1 demos (fully chartered local congregation) and 6 proto-demoi (start-up congregations not fully chartered with less than 3 members) established, which offer rituals and other events for members and frequently for the public as well. Two of the six proto-demoi cannot be independently verified to exist. Hellenion offers legal clergy training, basic adult religious education classes, and other educational/training courses for its members.

Another American group, Elaion, was founded in 2005 after members of other groups grew dissatisfied with what was, in their view, a de-emphasis on Hellenic ethics, philosophy, poetry, and art, and a re-emergence of "occult" doctrines among some practitioners. Elaion aimed to create an organization that emphasized ethics, piety, and "right-living", which they initially termed "Traditionalist Hellenismos". No reported numbers for current membership levels are known to exist. Among the various modern Stoic philosophical groups, many equate Zeus with Divine Providence, or Divine Logos. Among the modern Epicurean philosophical groups, Society of Epicurus accepts the ancient, naturalistic, polytheistic view of the Epicurean gods as one of three legitimate modern interpretations of Epicurean theology.

In Brazil, there are some religious groups, in different states. In addition, in Portuguese language, there is the website of RHB – Reconstrucionismo Helênico no Brasil, built since 2003 by Brazilian members of Hellenion and other international groups, such as the American Neokoroi and the Greek Thyrsos.

== See also ==
Hellenism

- Athenian calendar
- Dionysian Mysteries
- Ellinais
- Epicureanism
- Family tree of the Greek gods
- Gemistus Pletho
- Greco-Roman mysteries
- Greek deities
- Greek hero cult
- Greek mythology in popular culture
- Hellenistic philosophy
- Hellenistic religion
- Homeric Hymns
- Interpretatio graeca
- I Still Worship Zeus
- List of Ancient Greek temples
- Orphism (religion)
- Persecution of pagans in the late Roman Empire
- Platonism
- Pyrrhonism
- Pythagoreanism
- Religion in Modern Greece
- Stoicism
- Supreme Council of Ethnic Hellenes
- Twelve Olympians

Related systems and religions

- European Congress of Ethnic Religions
- Feraferia
- Gaianism
- Discordianism
- Greco-Buddhism
- Hermeticism
- Indo-Greek religions
- Kemetism
- List of modern pagan temples
- Milinda Pañha
- Modern paganism
- Mos maiorum
- Old Norse religion
- Polytheistic reconstructionism
- Reconstructionist Roman religion
- Religion in ancient Rome
- Roman imperial cult
- Wicca
