= I Still Worship Zeus =

2004 documentary film by Jamil Said

- Directed by: Jamil Said
- Written by: Jamil Said
- Produced by: Elaine Goffas; Jamil Said
- Cinematography: Jamil Said
- Edited by: Jamil Said
- Production company: Jamil Said Productions
- Release date: 2004
- Running time: 70 minutes
- Country: Greece
- Language: Greek

I Still Worship Zeus is a Greek documentary film about modern worship of the gods of ancient Greek religion and mythology. It was directed by Jamil Said and premiered in 2004.

== Synopsis ==
I Still Worship Zeus is about pagan revivalism in Greece. Practitioners here refer to their movement as the religion of the Dodekatheon—the twelve Olympians of ancient Greek religion and mythology. People involved in this current are interviewed and talk about their engagement. Most people appear with their name on screen, but some only with their profession and one woman's face is blurred. Their theological views vary but they agree that the gods are connected to important values. Several people bring up epiphanies where they say a god revealed itself to them. A few people give more extensive interviews. Panagiotis Marinis, a religious leader, says there is an unbroken continuity in Hellenic traditions. Socrates, a chiropractor, is building structures in classical Greek style at a country estate and complains about treaties that forbid rituals from taking place at important heritage sites. James O'Dell, a British expatriate in Greece since twelve years, is dedicated to the god Apollo and performs divination at the site of the Temple of Apollo at Delphi. Interlaced with the interviews is footage of rituals and public events, as well as brief views of ancient ruins and the landscape of the Greek countryside. Sceptical views are provided through interviews with officials from the Greek Orthodox Church and academics, who dismiss modern attempts to practice Hellenic religion. The members of revivalist groups in turn complain about the Orthodox Church's influence in Greek society and the unwillingness of the Greek state to fully grant them religious liberties.

== Production ==
Jamil Said had previously made the 2002 short film Byromania. He wrote, produced, directed, photographed and edited I Still Worship Zeus through his company Jamil Said Productions.

== Reception ==
I Still Worship Zeus premiered in 2004. Phil Hall of Film Threat called it "a fascinating and cogent exploration of the persistence of faith over the centuries", but said it suffers from slow pace and would have gained from talking more about the gods, whose appeal to the practitioners is not thoroughly explained. The religious studies scholar Michael Strmiska reviewed the film in The Pomegranate and said the interviews show a range and flexibility typical for modern paganism. He called the film informative and wrote that Said's neutrality, where he does not challenge claims by the practitioners, is central to the filmmaking method, although it leaves out more in-depths explorations. Strmiska said the film is aesthetically successful with a few problems such as misspelled subtitles and sometimes unwarranted background music.
