= Vlassis Rassias =

Greek writer, publisher, leader, and activist (1959–2019)

Vlassis G. Rassias
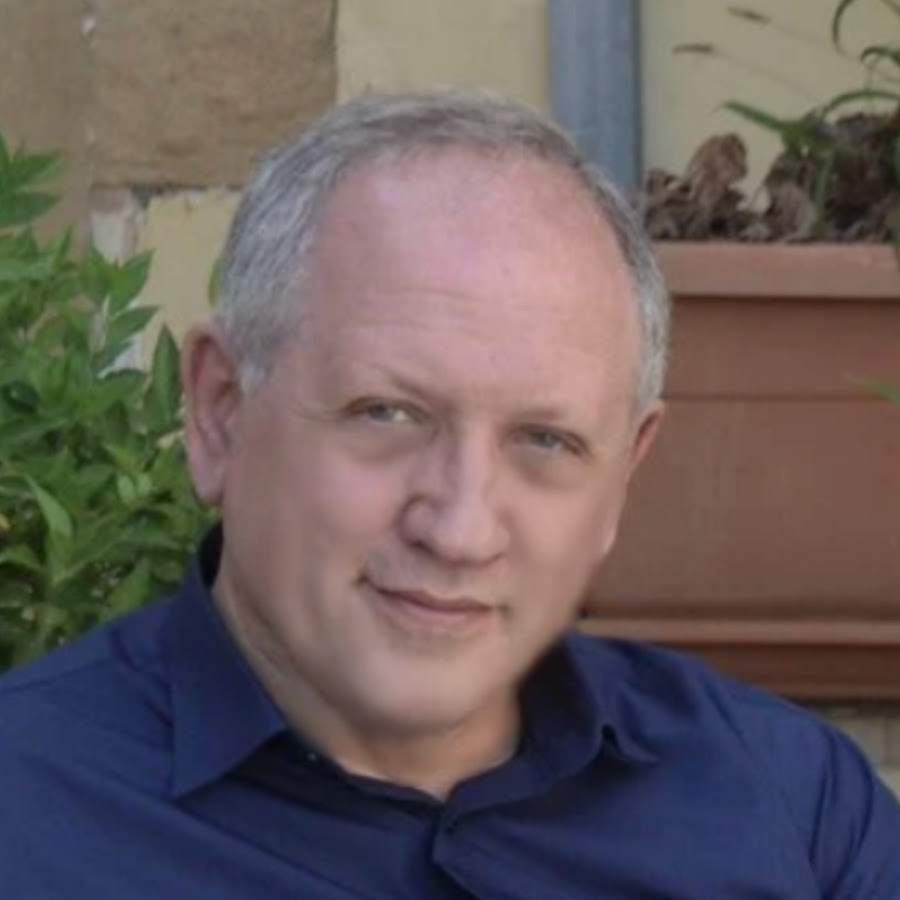
- Vlassis G. Rassias
- Born: 22 April 1959; Athens, Kingdom of Greece
- Died: 7 July 2019 (aged 60)
- Education: Supreme School of Economics and Business
- Occupations: Writer, religious leader of Hellenism

Vlassis G. Rassias (Greek: Βλάσης Γ. Ρασσιάς; 22 April 1959 – 7 July 2019) was a Greek writer, publisher, leader, and activist.

== Biography ==
Rassias was born in Athens in 1959 and received a degree from the Athens University of Economics and Business. He became involved in alternative culture and founded the magazines Speak Out (1979), Anoichtí Póli (Open City; 1980–1993) and Diipetés (Sent by Zeus; 1991–2012), and published the mail art magazine Eínai Ávrio (It's Tomorrow) from 1983 to 1986.

From the late 1970s and onwards he was engaged in advocacy for indigenous peoples and their ambition to retain their traditions and national dignity. He initially focused on indigenous peoples of the Americas, but eventually on the heritage from ancient Greece. According to Rassias, he had become critical of Orthodoxy as a teenager in 1976, during an incident where a Greek Orthodox monk used a sledgehammer to destroy the genitals of a replica of an ancient statue of Poseidon at the entrance of the Ministry of Education. In 1997 he co-founded the Supreme Council of Ethnic Hellenes (YSEE), a non-profit organisation whose primary goal is the protection and restoration of the Hellenic ethnic religion in contemporary Greek society. He led the organisation as its secretary general for the remainder of his life. In 2017 it was officially recognised by the Greek government, which granted Hellenic believers the right to openly worship, build temples, perform marriages and funerals, and write their religious beliefs on birth certificates. In 1998 he also participated in the founding of the World Congress of Ethnic Religions.

He wrote 21 books of history and essays of which 17 are about ancient Greece. He also wrote a philosophical dictionary and two poetry collections. A central theme in his books is that modern societies need to go through a new enlightenment, similar to the Enlightenment in Europe in the 18th century, which should allow every nation to express itself through its own traditions. He considered the ancient Greek outlook to be timeless, and thought that rediscovering it was the best way to uphold self-determination in a society. He placed the ancient Greek outlook in complete opposition to Greek Orthodoxy and the Byzantine Empire. He also showed a particular affinity for the philosophical school of the Stoics.
