= Kalliani =

Village in Arcadia, Greece

Kalliani Καλλιάνι
- Community
- Location within Greece
- Coordinates: 37°41′16″N 21°55′25″E
- Country: Greece
- Administrative region: Peloponnese
- Regional unit: Arcadia
- Municipality: Gortynia
- Municipal unit: Tropaia

Population (2021)
  - Community: 234
- Time zone: UTC+2 (EET)
  - Summer (DST): UTC+3 (EEST)

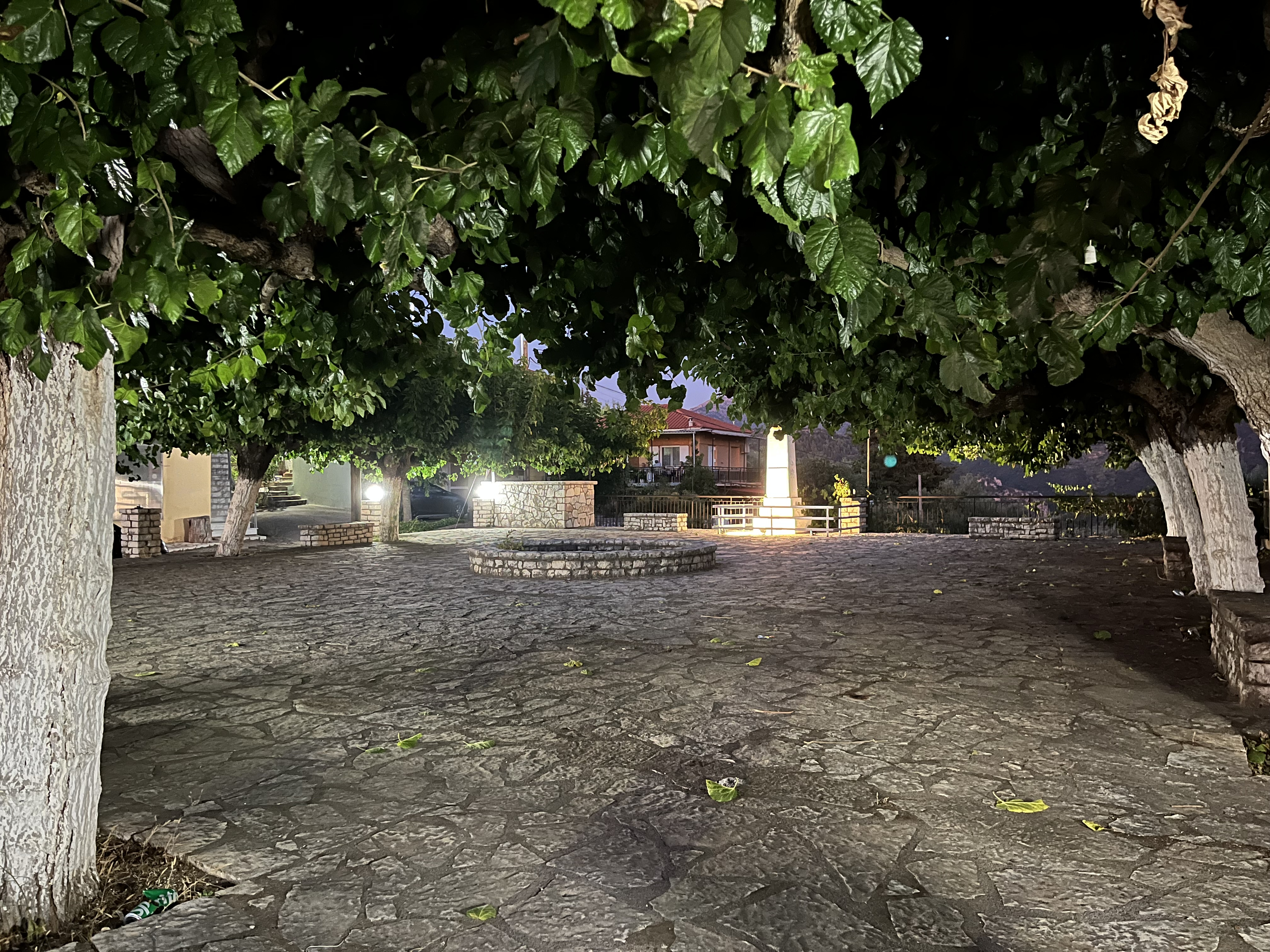
The village square of Kalliáni (2024)

Kalliani (Greek: Καλλιάνι) is a village in northwestern Arcadia, Peloponnese, Greece. It is part of the municipal unit of Tropaia in the municipality of Gortynia. The village is notable for having the third Modern Hellenic temple, dedicated to Zeus, Dionysus, and Pan, which opened in 2025.

== Population ==
Historical population
Year	Pop.	±%
1961	717	—
1971	613	−14.5%
1981	532	−13.2%
1991	543	+2.1%
2001	316	−41.8%
2011	291	−7.9%
2021	234	−19.6%
