= Religion in Greece =

Religion in Greece (2022)
1. Eastern Orthodoxy (85%)
2. Other Christians (3%)
3. Islam (2%)
4. Other religions (1%)
5. Unaffiliated (9%)

Religion in Greece is dominated by Christianity, in particular the Greek Orthodox Church, which is within the larger communion of the Eastern Orthodox Church; moreover, the Greek Constitution recognises Eastern Orthodoxy as the "prevailing" faith of the country (though in practice Greek lawmaking isn't influenced by religious dogma and most Greeks aren't very religious), while also guaranteeing freedom of religious belief for all. Eastern Orthodoxy represented 81 to 90% of the total population of Greece in 2022. Religions with smaller numbers of followers include Islam followed by different communities of Greek Muslims (now comprising only 2% of the population), Western Catholicism (comprising 1% of the population), Greek Catholicism, Judaism, Evangelicalism, Hellenic paganism, and Jehovah's Witnesses. A number of Greek atheists exist, not self-identifying as religious.

Religion is key part of identity for most Greeks, with 76% of Greeks in a 2015–2017 survey saying that their nationality is defined by Christianity. According to other sources, 81.4% of Greeks identify as Orthodox Christians and 14.7% are atheists.

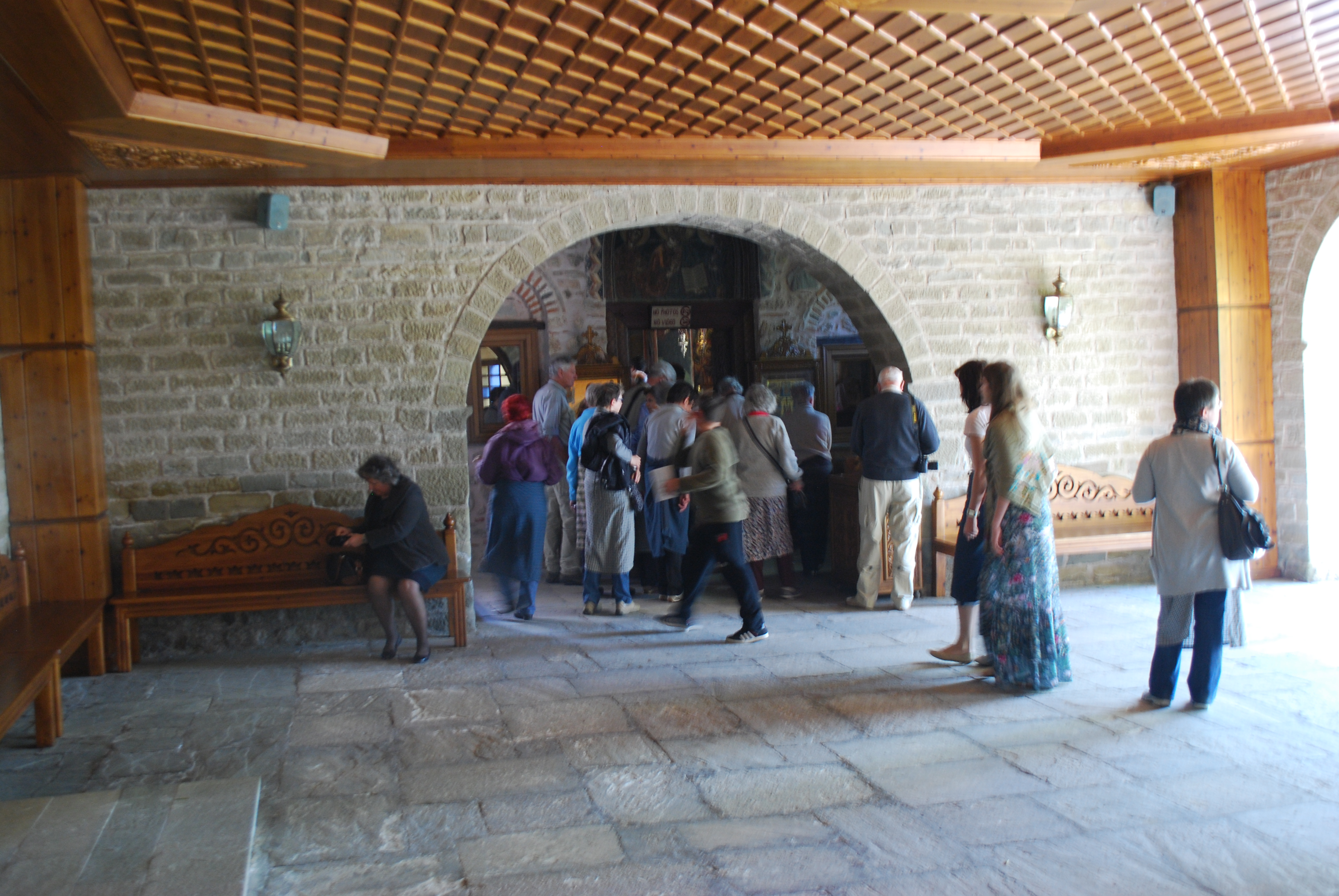
Monastery of Varlaam

== Demographics ==
In a report of the United States Department of State in 2022, an estimated 81% to 90% of respondents identified as Greek Orthodox, less than 1% as Catholic and 3% as part of other Christian denominations. Muslims comprised 2% and other religions less than 1%. Atheists made up 4 to 15% percent of the population.

According to a 2024 survey by Metron Analysis for To Vima, 66% of Greeks reported having a religion, while only 15% reported attending church regularly.

== Christianity ==
=== Eastern Orthodoxy ===
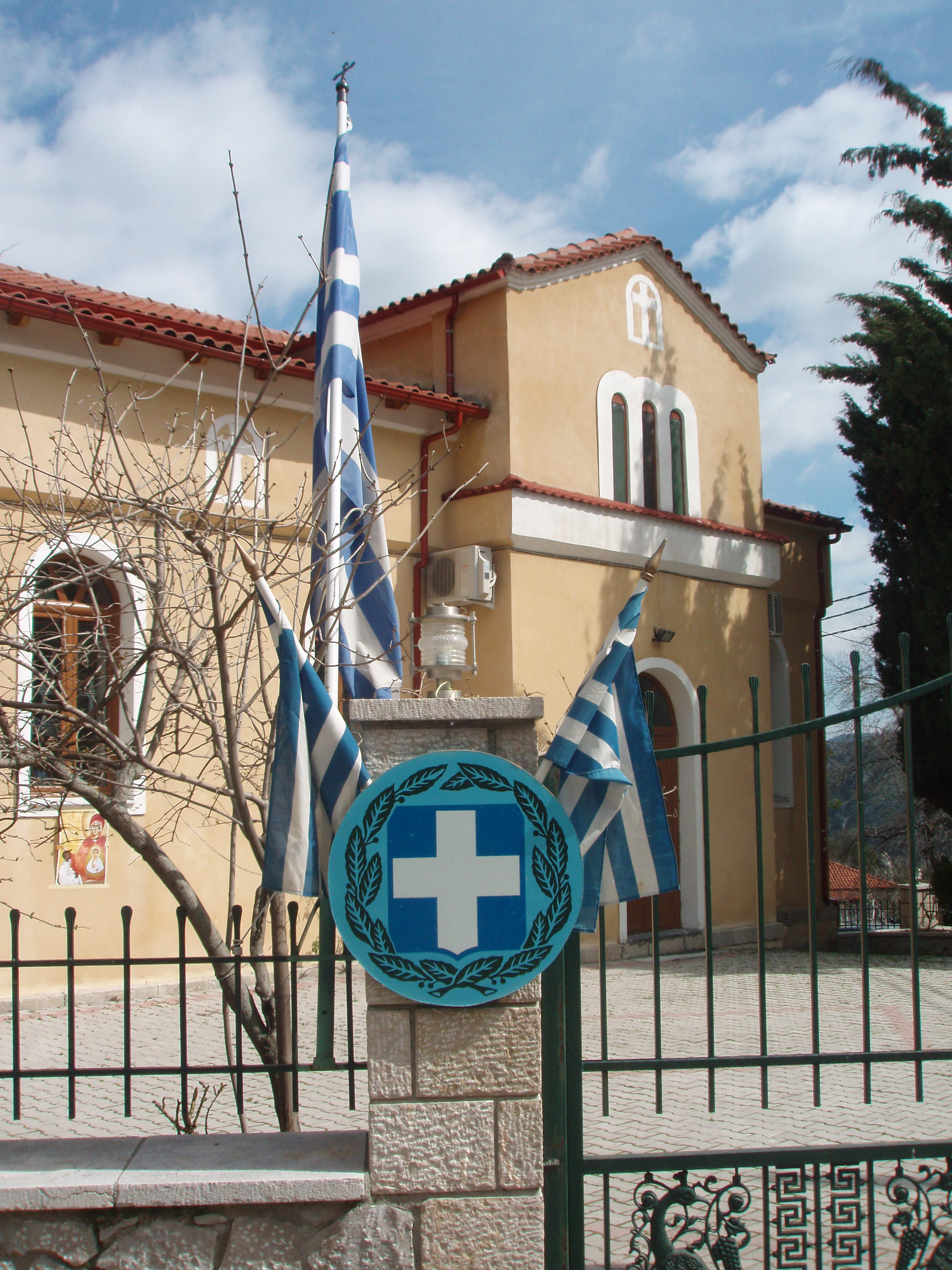
The Greek Orthodox Church retains close ties with the Greek state, emphasized by the presence of Greek flags in all Orthodox churches, but also by the religious depiction of the flag and the coat of arms of Greece itself.

The Church of Greece, a member of the Eastern Orthodox Communion, is accorded the status of "prevailing religion" in Greece's constitution. Since 1850, Greek Orthodoxy within Greece is handled by the Church. Its members are 79% of the population according to the most recent research in 2022 mentioned above.

The status of the Orthodox church as the "prevailing religion" is largely based on the role the church played for the preservation of the Greek nation through the years of the Ottoman Empire but also for the role the church played in the Greek War of Independence. As a result, some attribute to the modern Greek nation an ethnoreligious identity.

Furthermore, the mainstream Orthodox clergy's salaries and pensions are paid for by the State at rates comparable to those of teachers. All Greek students in primary and secondary schools in Greece attend Christian Orthodox instruction, although there is an exemption system for students who do not want to attend, as long as the exemption is requested by both parents.

=== Catholicism ===
Catholics made up less than 1% of the total population in 2015. The Catholic community has increased in size in recent years due to immigration and today number over 200,000.

==== Roman Catholics ====
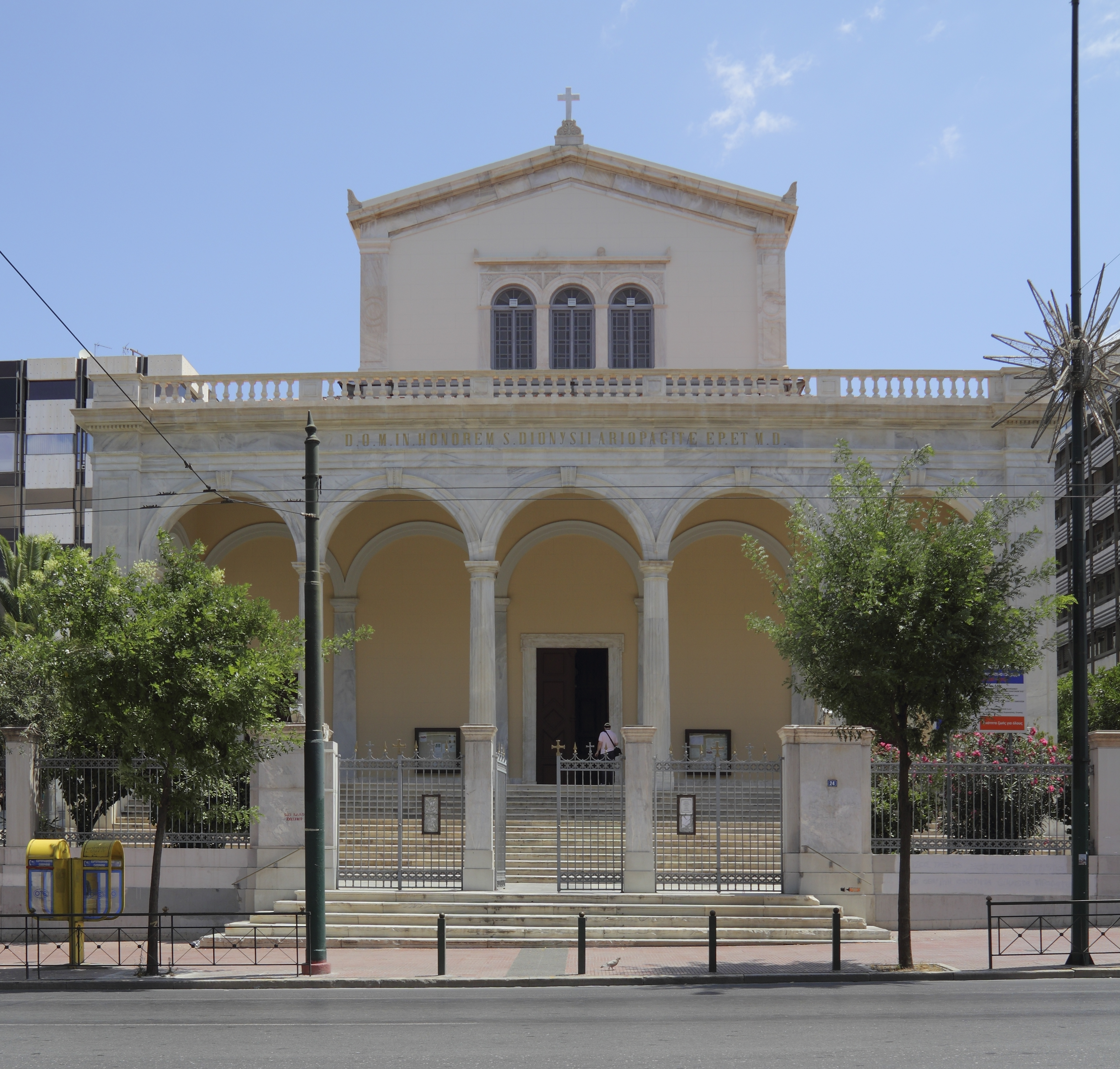
Cathedral Basilica of St. Dionysius the Areopagite in Athens

Roman Catholic Greeks number approximately 50,000 and are found all over Greece; the majority, however, live in the Cyclades and the Ionian Islands. The presence of Catholics in the Greek islands is mostly a heritage from the time of the Venetian domination in the Middle Ages. The Catholic community has increased in size in recent years due to immigration and today number over 200,000.

==== Greek Catholics ====
Catholic Greeks of the Byzantine Rite (Uniates or Unites) number approximately 6,000 nationwide and mostly live in Athens.

=== Protestantism ===
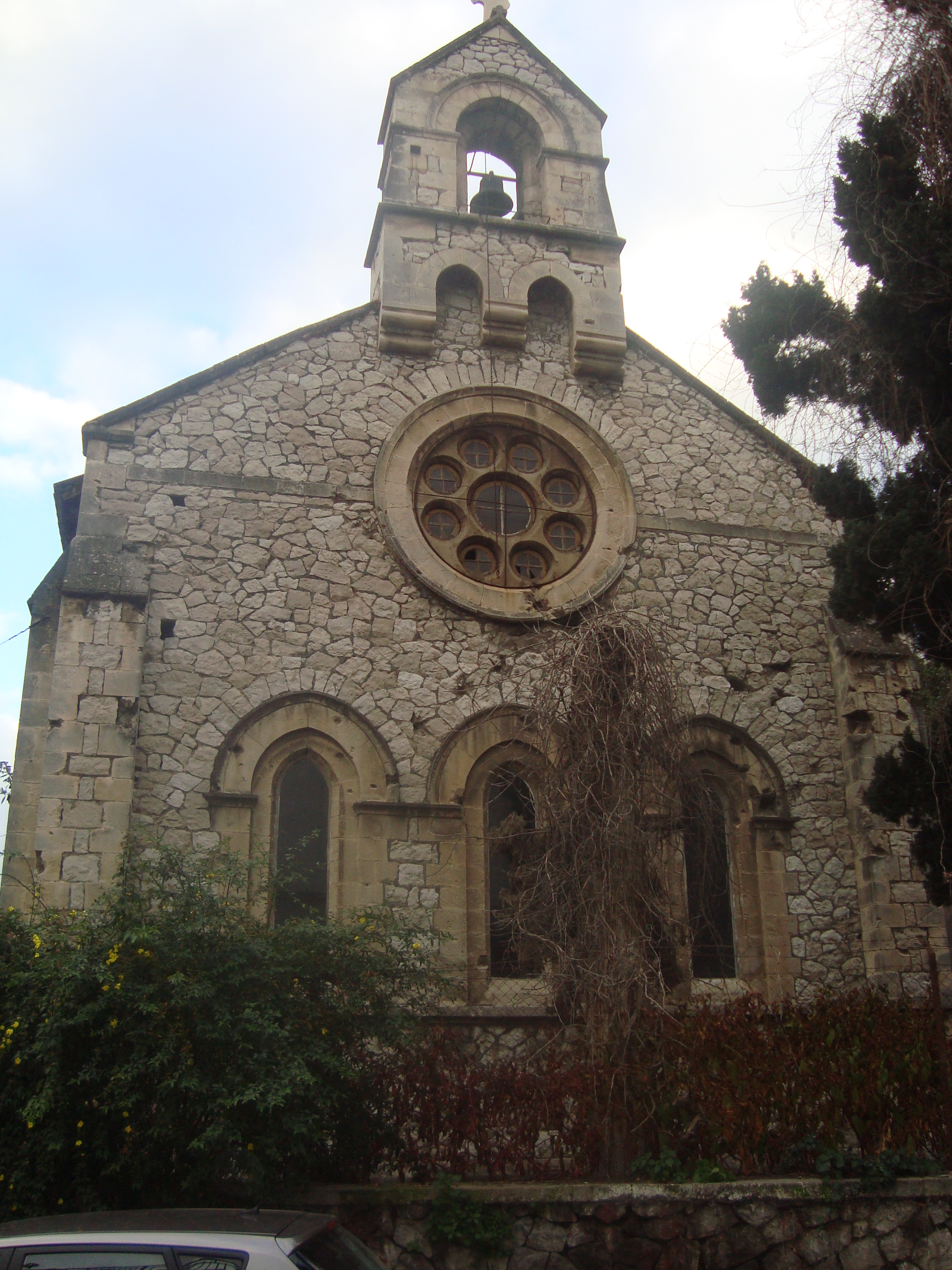
The Anglican Church of Saint Andrew, Patras

The Protestant population, including Greek Evangelical Church and Free Evangelical Churches, stood at about 23,000 people in 2020 (0.23% of the country). The Free Apostolic Church of the Pentecost was founded by Leonidas Feggos in 1965. The official church, Eastern Orthodox, and the State reluctantly gave permission for Pentecostal churches to operate legally. The process of receiving permission from the Ministry of Education and Religion to operate as a church is becoming easier. Assemblies of God, the International Church of the Foursquare Gospel and other Pentecostal churches of the Greek Synod of Apostolic Church have 12,000 members. The Independent Free Apostolic Church of Pentecost is the biggest Protestant denomination in Greece with 120 churches. There are no official statistics about Free Apostolic Church of Pentecost, but the Orthodox Church estimates the followers at 20,000.

=== Armenian Church ===
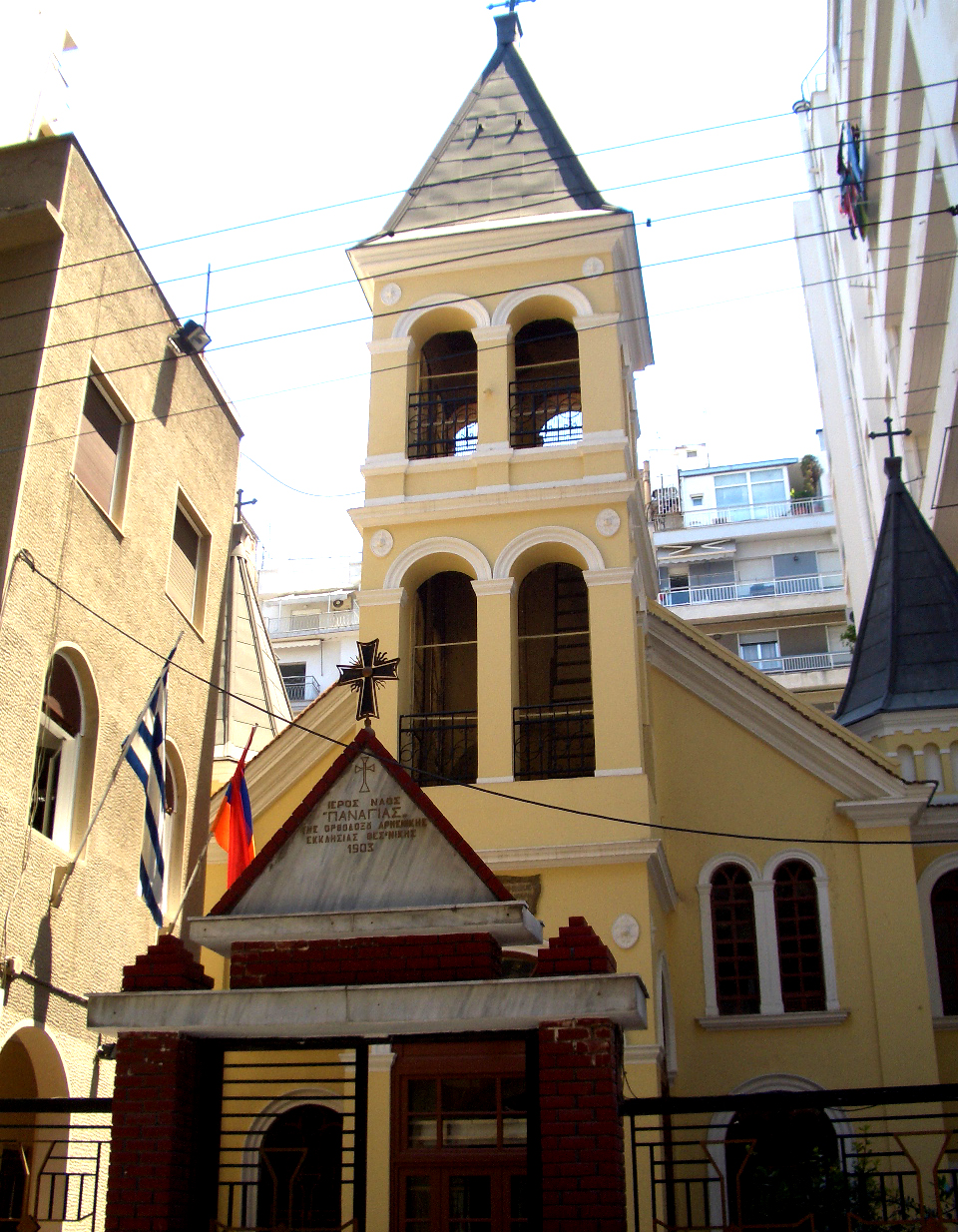
Armenian Church of Virgin Mary in Thessaloniki.

The presence of Armenians in Greece dates back centuries (from the Byzantine period), when Armenians settled in Thessalia, Macedonia, Thrace and the islands of Crete and Corfu for various reasons such as war or business.

The Armenians in Greece acquired the character of a community after the 1920s, when 70,000 to 80,000 survivors of the Armenian genocide fled to Greece. Today, emigration to North America has diminished the Armenian population of Greece. The number now counts for roughly 20,000–35,000 Greco-Armenians.

== Religious minorities ==
=== Islam ===
The number of citizens of Greece who are Muslims is estimated to be at 140,000 people or, approximately, 1.5% of the total population, according to the 2022 report. They live mostly in Western Thrace and are primarily of Turkish (Turks of Western Thrace), Slavonic (Pomak) and Romani descent. In 2022, an additional 520,000 Muslims, mostly asylum seekers, refugees, and other migrants live in the country; with approximately half of them living in Athens.

Ottoman era Greek Muslims from parts of Northern Greece like western Macedonia, such as the Vallahades and other communities, and the Greek Muslim Turco-Cretans from Crete, were forcibly resettled in Turkey with the 1923 Population exchange between Greece and Turkey. However, several thousand of the latter Cretan Greek Muslims were resettled in Syria and Libya after being ethnically cleansed from Crete following the Greco-Turkish War of 1897.

Although the vast majority of Greek converts to Islam in Anatolia assimilated with the Turkish Muslim population in the Seljuk and Ottoman period, there are still tens of thousands of Muslim Pontic Greeks in highland villages in the Black Sea region of Northeast Turkey.

=== Judaism ===
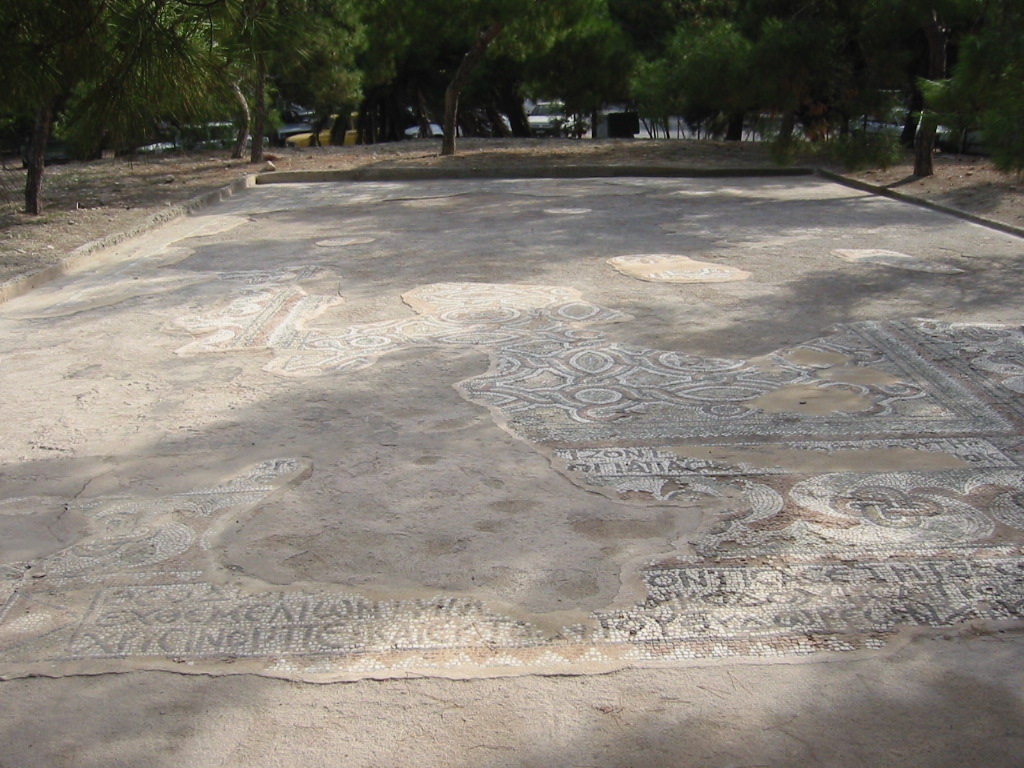
Mosaic floor of an ancient Romaniote Jewish synagogue, 300 CE, Aegina.

The Jewish community in Greece currently amounts to roughly 5,500 people, concentrated mainly in Athens, Thessaloniki, Larissa, Volos, Chalkis, Ioannina, Trikala and Corfu, while few remain in Kavala and Rhodes. It is composed largely of two groups, the Romaniotes, Jewish communities dating back to Antiquity, and the Ladino-speaking Sephardim, who arrived from Spain and settled chiefly in Thessaloniki during Ottoman times. For several centuries from the 1500s until the early 1900s, Thessaloniki was the largest Jewish-majority city on Earth. However, during the Nazi occupation of Greece in the 1940s, between 82 to 92 percent of Greece's 75,000 Jews were killed.

=== Buddhism ===
The number of the followers is not so high amongst the Greeks but it has increased during the last decades because of the immigration of people from East Asia, Sri Lanka and Southeast Asia in Greece. Sri Lankan and Southeast Asian migrant workers working in Greece were usually sent back to their home country to be cremated, due to cremation being banned in Greece until 2006. Today there are three religious centers, in Athens, Thessaloniki and Corinth.

=== Hinduism ===
Hinduism in Greece has a small following, primarily being followed by Hindu expatriates from India. A small active Hindu community in present in the capital, Athens. On March 1, 2006, the Greek government passed a law allowing cremation. The law was welcomed by the Indian community in Athens. Many Hindu organizations belonging to ISKCON, Brahma Kumaris, Sahaja Yoga and others have opened in Greece.

=== Sikhism ===
Sikhs have been in Greece since the World Wars, as part of the British Indian Army. Guru Nanak is also known to have passed through Greece during one of his journeys. However, actual immigration to Greece began in the 1970s. It reached its peak during the 1990s–2000s. As of 2017, Sikhs are estimated to number 20,000–25,000. There are eight Gurudwaras in Greece, most of them located in Central Greece and only one being in Crete. Gurudwaras are often officially documented as personal properties, community centres or libraries, due to the paperwork needed and also due to the lack of recognition of Sikhs by the Greek Government. Sikhs often face racism and discrimination by the Greek public, who confuse them with Muslims, as well as legal challenges, mostly due to the distinct appearance (The Five Ks). Sikhs are not allowed to wear their turbans and ride motorcycles without helmets, as in the United Kingdom, where their contributions in the war efforts were recognized and they were allowed to not wear helmets. Young Sikhs often face difficulties when recruited for the mandatory conscription in Greece, due to their long hair, beard and turbans. Sikhism is still not an officially recognized religion in Greece and Sikhs are often not included in censuses. Media coverage of Sikhs is minimal and their religion is often reported as "a mix of Hinduism and Islam", despite having a distinct belief and cultural system. On 1 March 2006, the Greek government passed a law allowing cremation, a move welcomed by both Sikhs and Hindus. Since the 2008 financial crisis, many Sikhs have migrated to other countries, such as the United Kingdom, Canada and Germany.

== Atheism and Non-Religious Population ==
Greece, traditionally known for the strong presence of the Greek Orthodox Church, has seen a gradual increase in the proportion of people identifying as atheist, agnostic, or non-religious. While findings since 1981 indicated strong religious sentiment, with around 80% of Greeks believing in God, a closer look reveals a partial retreat as Irreligion in Greece grows: in 2024, 27% of Greeks reported being indifferent to religion, up from 18% in 2018. According to a nationwide survey by Metron Analysis for To Vima in December 2024, 66% of Greeks declared that they have a religion, but only 15% reported attending church regularly. Estimates from other sources suggest that roughly 4–15% of the population explicitly identify as atheist.

=== Atheist Union of Greece ===
The Atheist Union of Greece is a non-profit organization dedicated to defending the rights of Greek atheists, promoting secularism, and advocating for the separation of church and state. Founded in 2010 and legally recognized in 2012, the union operates independently of political parties and religious ideologies and is governed by an elected five-member secretariat. Funding comes primarily from member contributions and donations.

The Atheist Union of Greece is an affiliate of Atheist Alliance International, a global federation of atheist and freethought organisations.

==== Legal Advocacy ====
The union has challenged the recording of religion on school diplomas and advocated for exemptions from religious education. In 2019, the Council of State ruled that including students' religious affiliation on graduation certificates and other school documents was unconstitutional. In 2023, the union appealed a ministerial decision requiring students to disclose their religious beliefs to be exempted from religious classes; the Council of State ruled that the exemption process did not violate the Greek Constitution or the European Convention on Human Rights.

== Hellenic ethnic religion ==
Over 2000 people are members of the Supreme Council of Ethnic Hellenes, the foremost organisation of Hellenic ethnic religion. Over 100,000 people are "sympathisers". On 9 April 2017 the Hellenic ethnic religion was officially recognized by the Greek state.

== Other faiths ==
Other minor faiths in Greece include Jehovah's Witnesses (who number about 28,000), Seventh-day Adventists and Mormons. Groups that constitute less than 1 percent of the population includes those of the Baháʼí Faith.

== Gallery ==
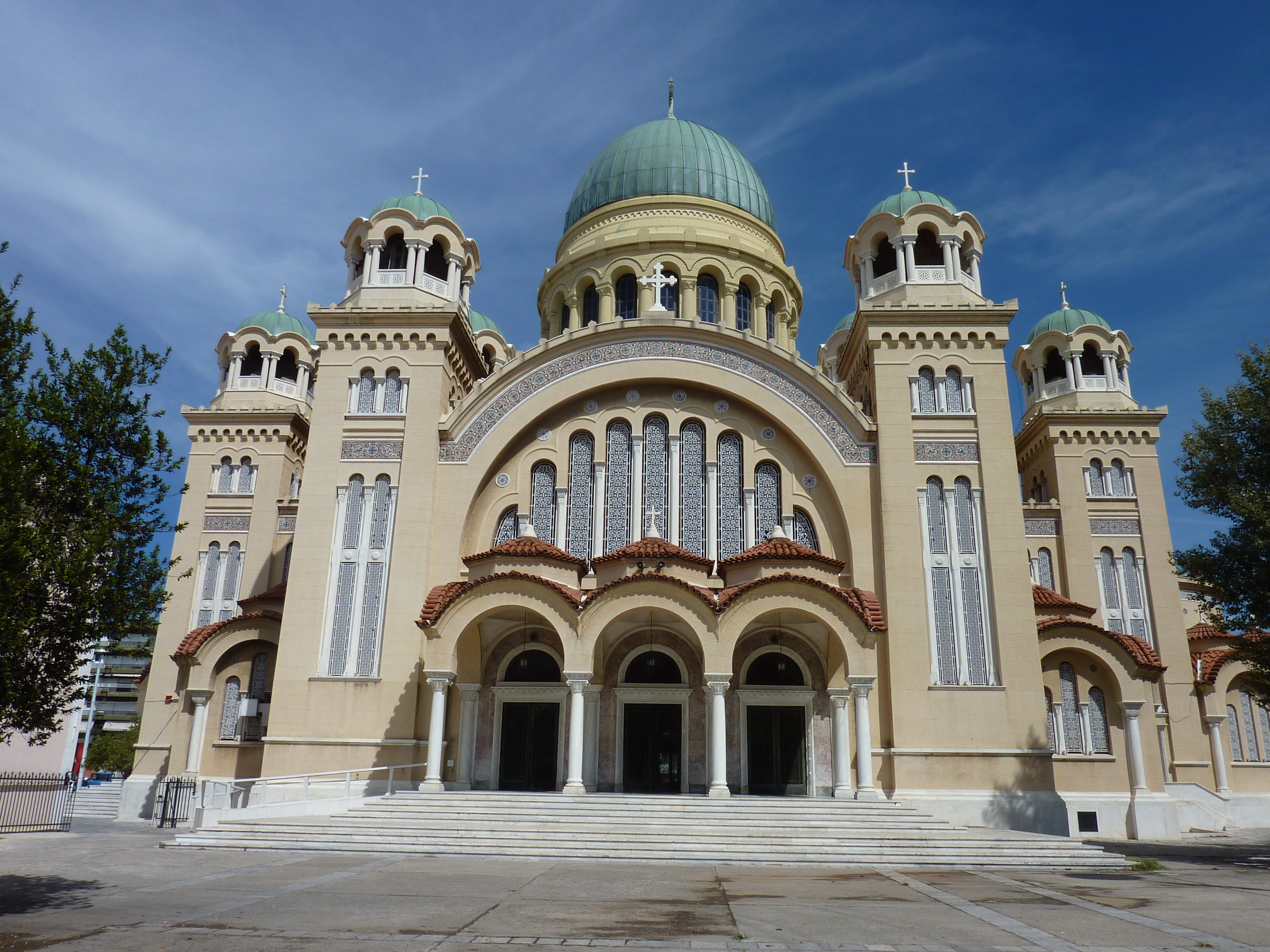
Saint Andrew Church of Patras

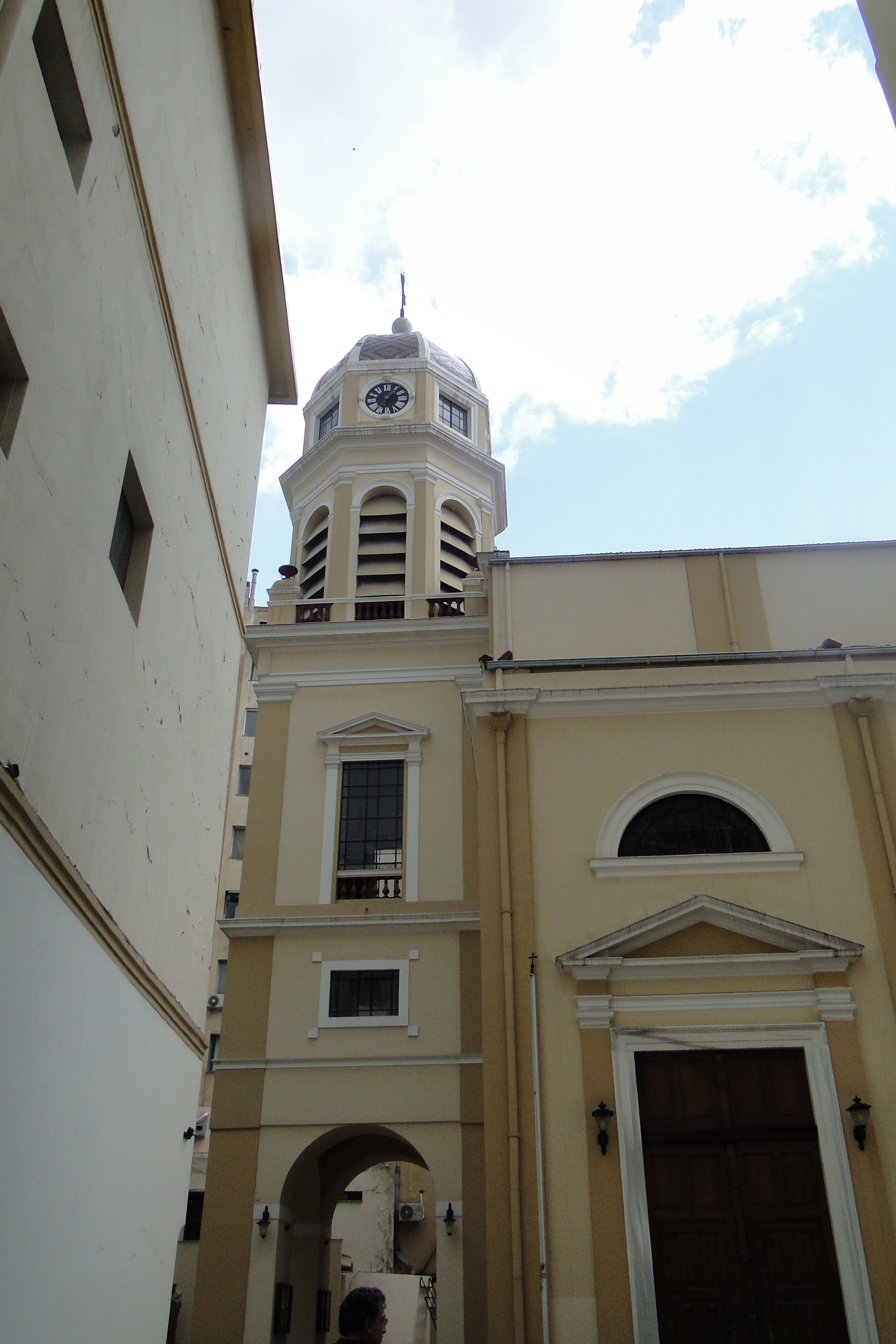
Catholic church of Thessaloniki

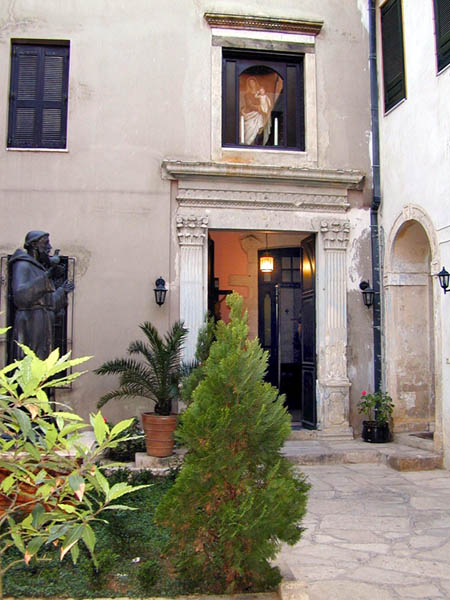
Catholic (Capuchin) church of Chania

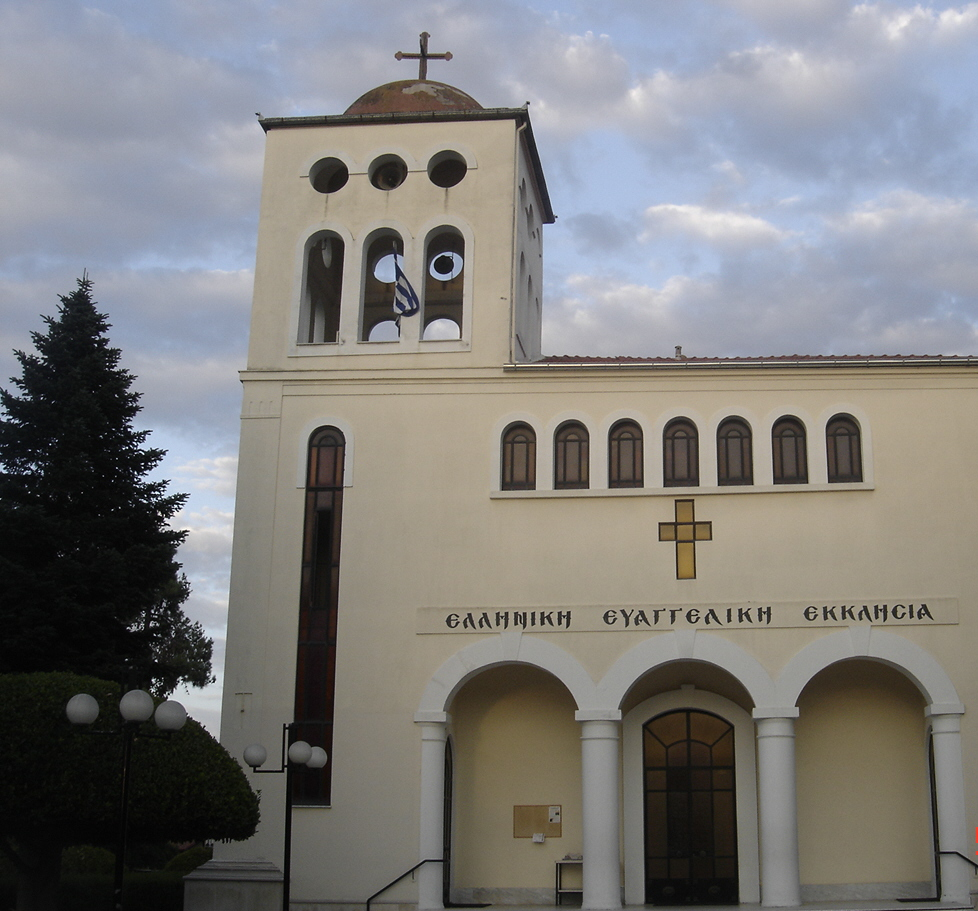
Evangelical church in Katerini

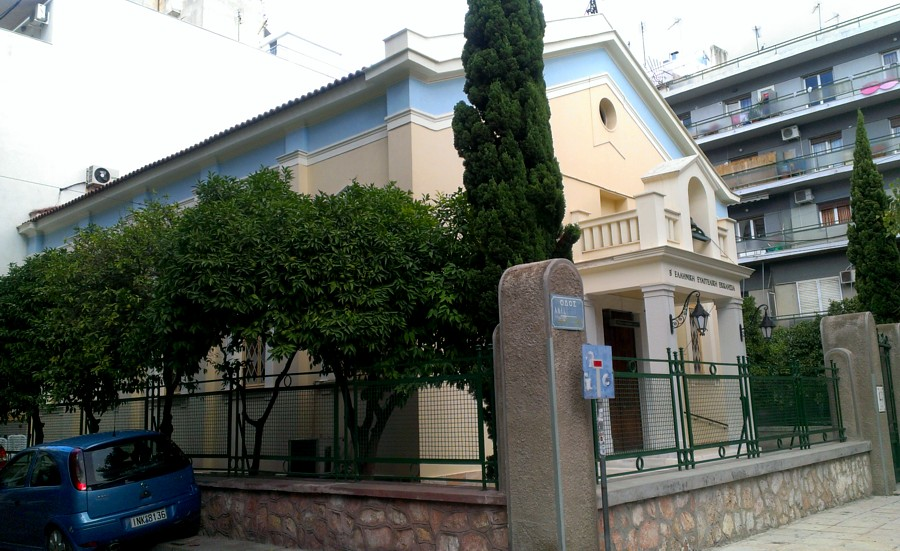
Evangelical church in Athens

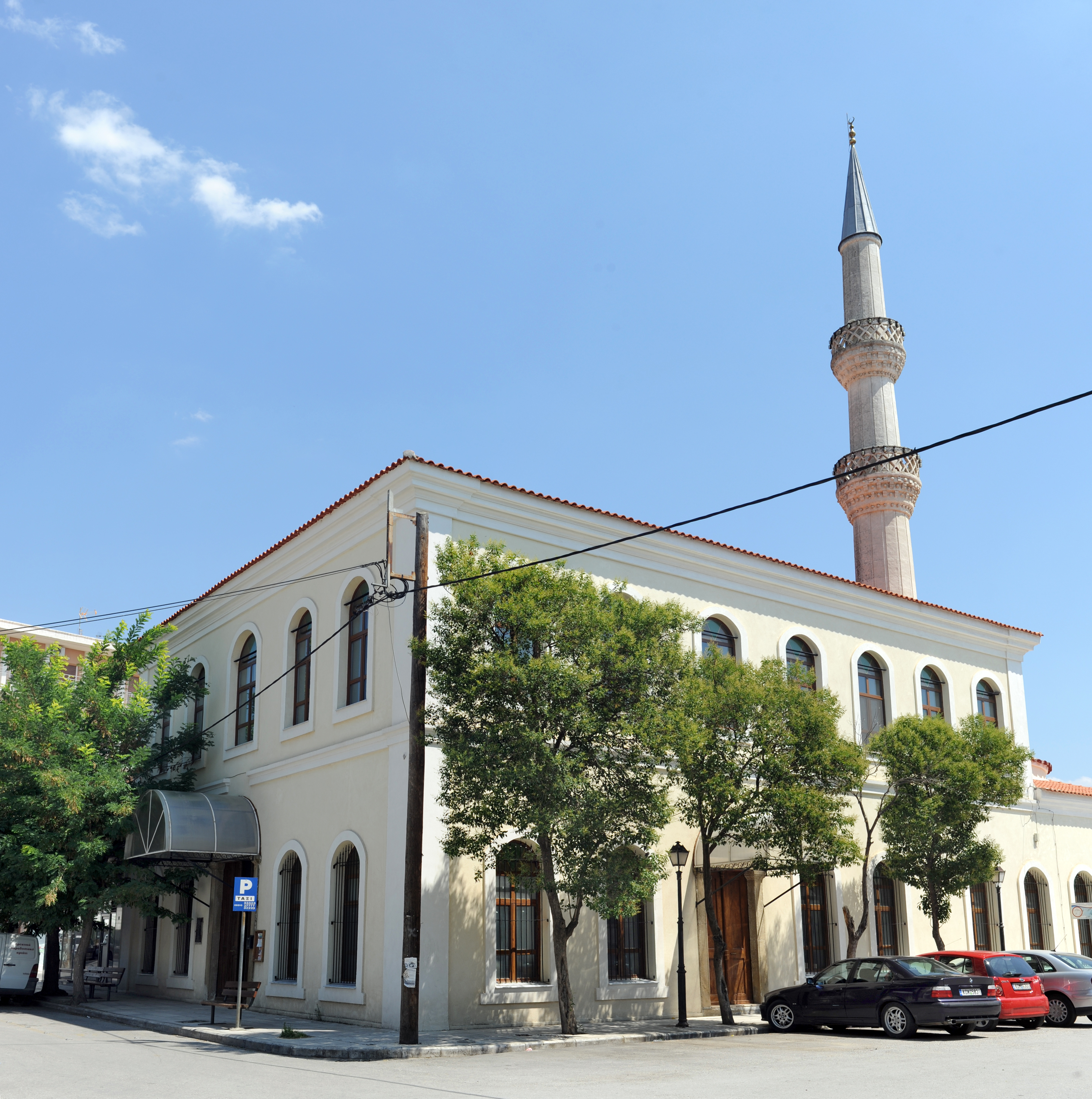
Eski Mosque, Komotini

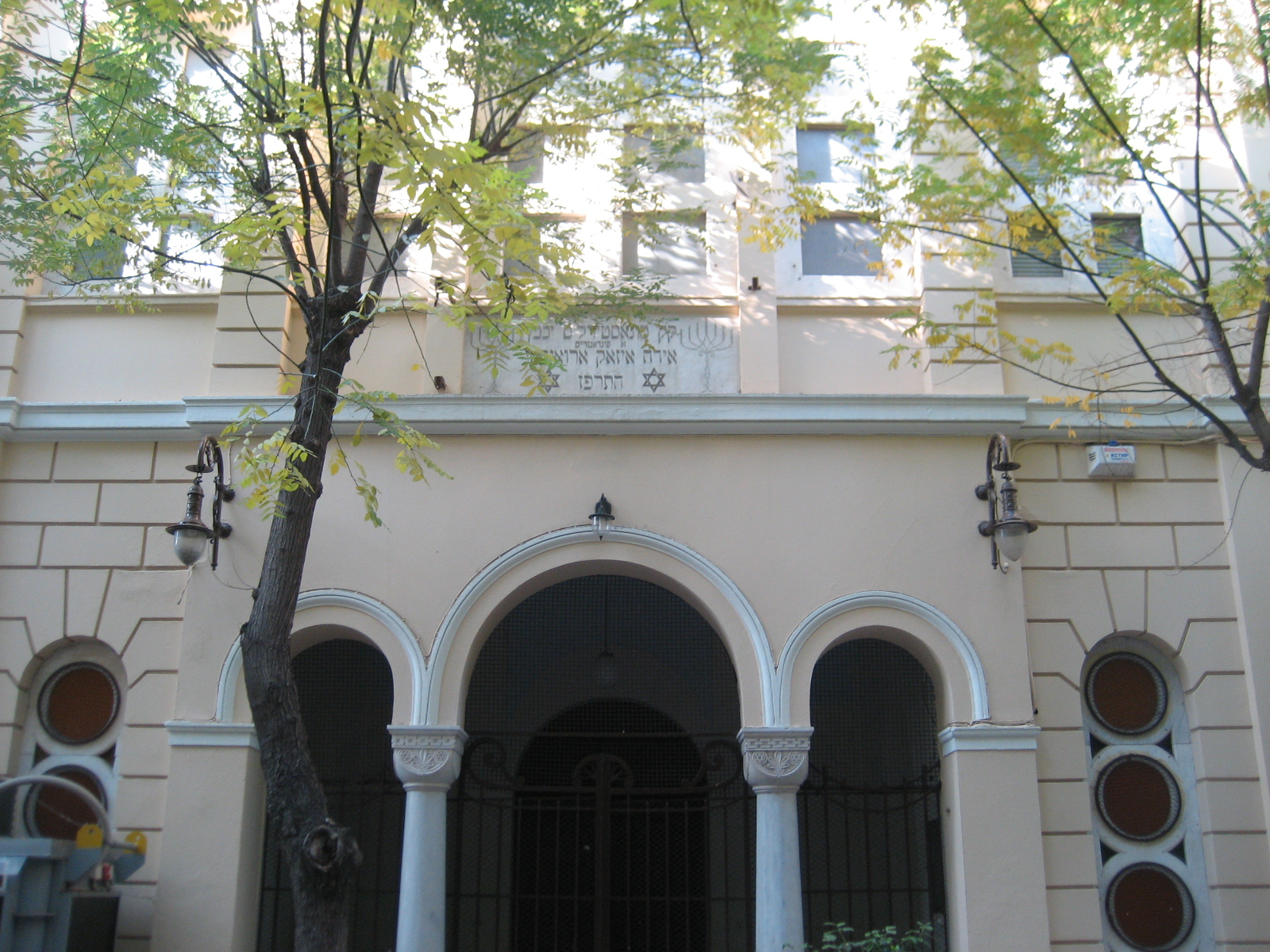
Monastir Synagogue (Thessaloniki)

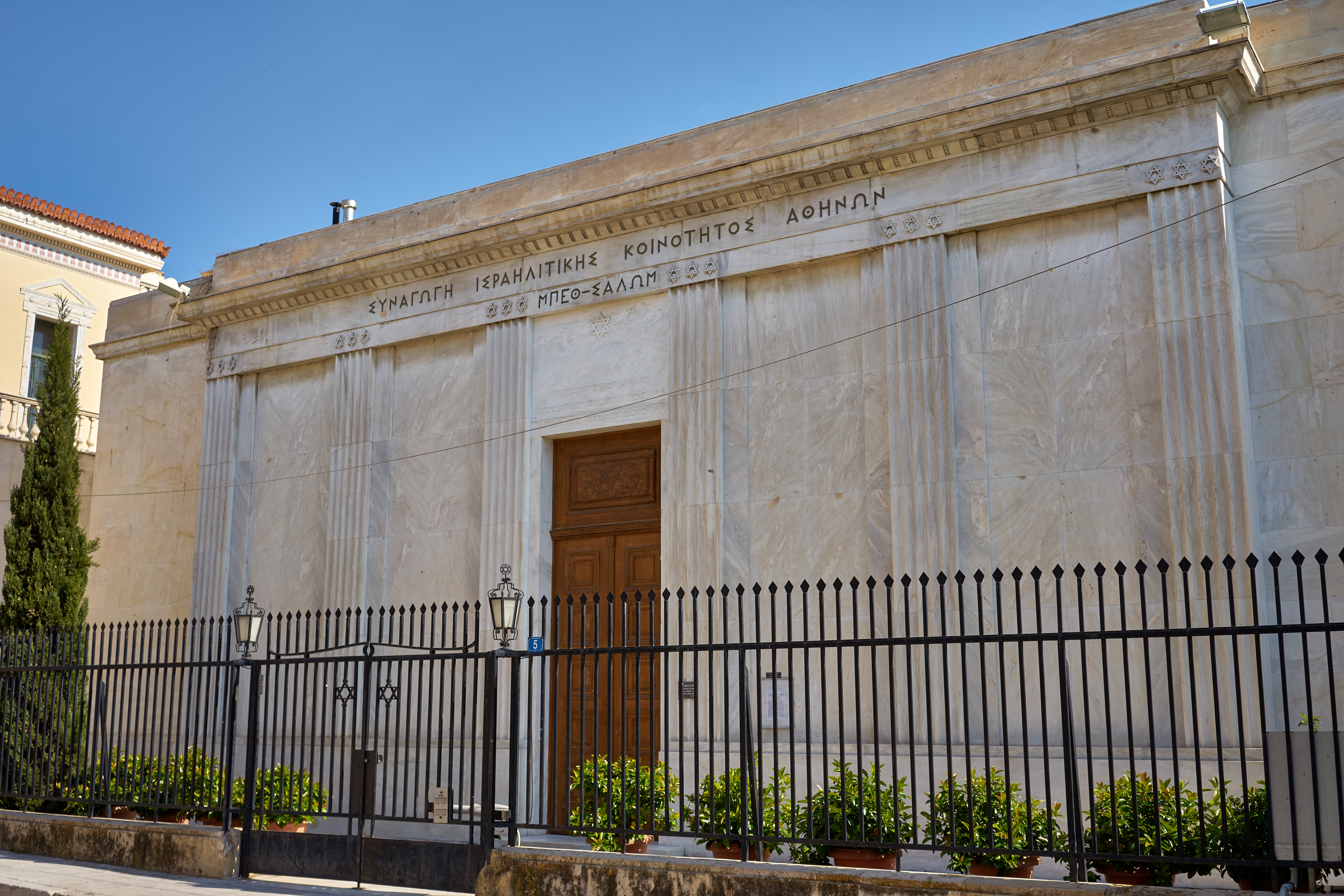
Beth Shalom Synagogue

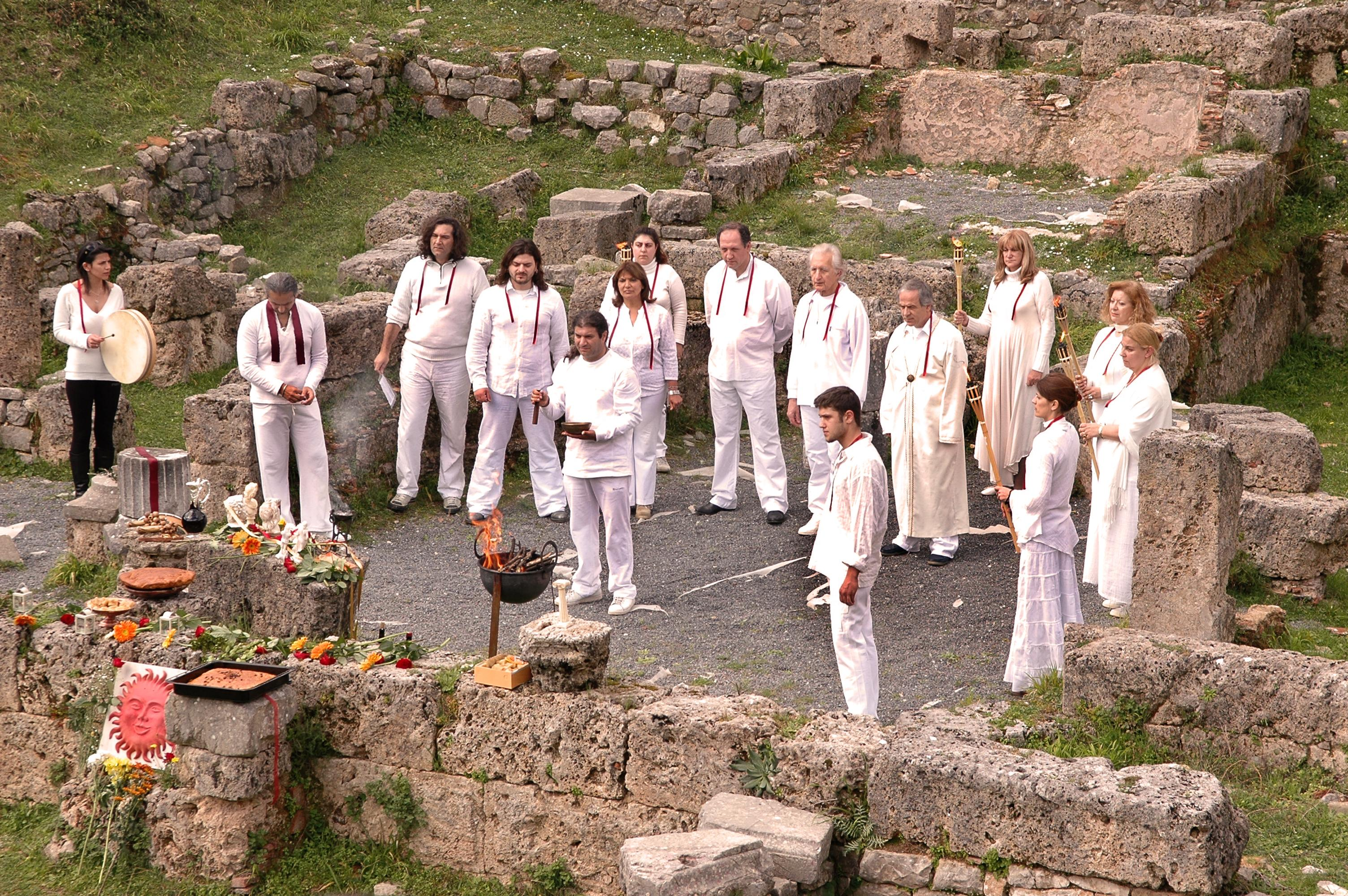
Ritual performed by Supreme Council of Ethnikoi Hellenes

== See also ==
- Religion in Cyprus
- Freedom of religion in Greece
- Human rights in Greece
