= Twelve Olympians =

Major deities of the Greek pantheon

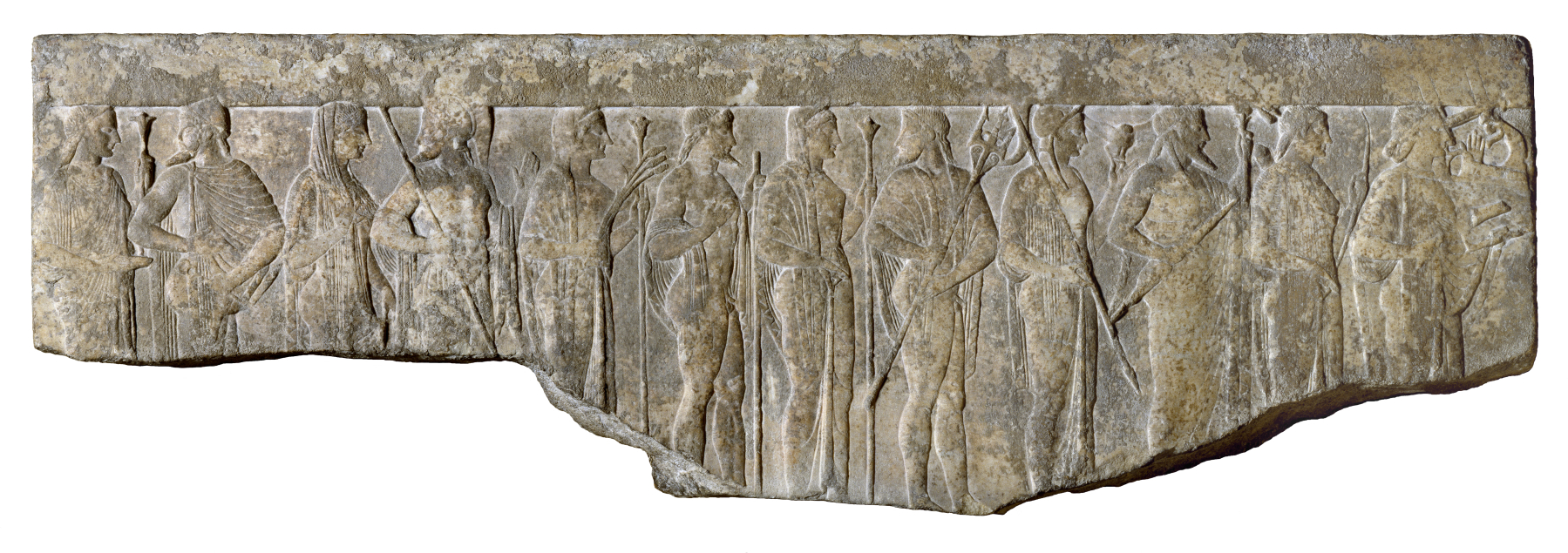
Fragment of a Hellenistic relief (1st century BC–1st century AD) depicting the twelve Olympians carrying their attributes in procession; from left to right: Hestia (scepter), Hermes (winged cap and staff), Aphrodite (veiled), Ares (helmet and spear), Demeter (scepter and wheat sheaf), Hephaestus (staff), Hera (scepter), Poseidon (trident), Athena (owl and helmet), Zeus (thunderbolt and staff), Artemis (bow and quiver) and Apollo (lyre) from the Walters Art Museum.

In ancient Greek religion and mythology, the twelve Olympians are the major deities of the Greek pantheon, commonly considered to be Zeus, Poseidon, Hera, Demeter, Aphrodite, Athena, Artemis, Apollo, Ares, Hephaestus, Hermes, and either Hestia or Dionysus. They were called Olympians because, according to tradition, they resided on Mount Olympus.

Besides the twelve Olympians, there were many other cultic groupings of twelve gods.

== Olympians ==
The Olympians are a race of deities, primarily consisting of a third and fourth generation of immortal beings, worshipped as the principal gods of the Greek pantheon and so named because of their residency atop Mount Olympus. They gained their supremacy in a ten-year-long war of gods, known as the Titanomachy, in which Zeus led his siblings to victory over the previous generation of ruling immortal beings, the Titans, children of the primordial deities Gaia (Earth) and Uranus (Sky). They were a family of gods, the most important consisting of the first generation of Olympians, offspring of the Titans Cronus and Rhea: Zeus, Poseidon, Hera, Demeter and Hestia, along with the principal offspring of Zeus: Aphrodite, Athena, Artemis, Apollo, Ares, Hephaestus, Hermes and Dionysus. Although Hades was a major deity in the Greek pantheon and was the brother of Zeus and the other first generation of Olympians, his realm was far away from Olympus in the underworld, and thus he was not usually considered to be one of the Olympians. Olympic gods can be contrasted to chthonic gods including Hades and his wife Persephone, by mode of sacrifice, the latter receiving sacrifices in a bothros (βόθρος, "pit") or megaron (μέγαρον, "sunken chamber") rather than at an altar.

The canonical number of Olympian gods was twelve, but besides the (thirteen) principal Olympians listed above, there were many other residents of Olympus, who thus might be considered to be Olympians. Heracles became a resident of Olympus after his apotheosis and married another Olympian resident Hebe. According to Diodorus Siculus, some said that Heracles was offered a place among the twelve, but refused as it would mean one of the original twelve being "cast out". In the Iliad, the goddess Themis, who is listed among the twelve Titans, dwells on Olympus alongside the other gods, making her a Titan and an Olympian at the same time. According to Hesiod, the children of Styx—Zelus (Envy), Nike (Victory), Kratos (Strength), and Bia (Force)—"have no house apart from Zeus, nor any dwelling nor path except that wherein God leads them, but they dwell always with Zeus". Some others who might be considered Olympians include the Horae, the Charites (Graces), the Muses, Eileithyia, Iris, Dione, and Ganymede.

== Twelve gods ==
Throughout ancient Greece, there were many cultic groupings of twelve gods, with varying members. The earliest evidence of Greek religious practice involving twelve gods (Greek: δωδεκάθεον, dōdekátheon, from δώδεκα dōdeka, "twelve", and θεοί theoi, "gods") comes no earlier than the late sixth century BC. According to Thucydides, an altar of the twelve gods was established in the agora of Athens by the archon Pisistratus (son of Hippias and the grandson of the tyrant Pisistratus), around 522 BC. The altar became the central point from which distances from Athens were measured and a place of supplication and refuge.

Olympia apparently also had an early tradition of twelve gods. The Homeric Hymn to Hermes (c. 500 BC) has the god Hermes divide a sacrifice of two cows he has stolen from Apollo into twelve parts, on the banks of the river Alpheus (presumably at Olympia):

Next glad-hearted Hermes dragged the rich meats he had prepared and put them on a smooth, flat stone, and divided them into twelve portions distributed by lot, making each portion wholly honorable.

Pindar, in an ode written to be sung at Olympia c. 480 BC, has Heracles sacrificing, alongside the Alpheus, to the "twelve ruling gods":

[Heracles] enclosed the Altis all around and marked it off in the open, and he made the encircling area a resting-place for feasting, honoring the stream of the Alpheus along with the twelve ruling gods.

Another of Pindar's Olympian odes mentions "six double altars". Herodorus of Heraclea (c. 400 BC) also has Heracles founding a shrine at Olympia, with six pairs of gods, each pair sharing a single altar.

Many other places had cults of the twelve gods, including Delos, Chalcedon, Magnesia on the Maeander, and Leontinoi in Sicily. As with the twelve Olympians, although the number of gods was fixed at twelve, the membership varied. While the majority of the gods included as members of these other cults of twelve gods were Olympians, non-Olympians were also sometimes included. For example, Herodorus of Heraclea identified the six pairs of gods at Olympia as: Zeus and Poseidon, Hera and Athena, Hermes and Apollo, the Charites and Dionysus, Artemis and Alpheus, and Cronus and Rhea. Thus, while this list includes the eight Olympians: Zeus, Poseidon, Hera, Athena, Hermes, Apollo, Artemis, and Dionysus, it also contains three clear non-Olympians: the Titan parents of the first generation of Olympians, Cronus and Rhea, and the river god Alpheus, with the status of the Charites (here apparently counted as one god) being unclear.

Plato connected "twelve gods" with the twelve months and implies that he considered Pluto (or Hades) one of the twelve in proposing that the final month be devoted to him and the spirits of the dead.

The Roman poet Ennius gives the Roman equivalents (the Dii Consentes) as six male-female complements, preserving the place of Vesta (Greek Hestia), who played a crucial role in Roman religion as a state goddess maintained by the Vestals.

== List ==
There is no single canonical list of the twelve Olympian gods. The thirteen Greek gods and goddesses, along with their Roman counterparts, most commonly considered to be one of the twelve Olympians are listed below.

Greek	Roman	Image	Functions and attributes
Zeus	Jupiter		King of the gods and ruler of Mount Olympus; god of the sky, lightning, thunder, law, order and justice. The youngest child of the Titans Cronus and Rhea. Brother and husband of Hera and brother of Poseidon, Hades, Demeter, and Hestia. He had many affairs with goddesses and mortals, such as his sister Demeter and Leto, mortals Leda and Alcmene, and more. His symbols include the thunderbolt, eagle, oak tree, bull, scepter, and scales.
Hera	Juno		Queen of the gods and the goddess of marriage, women, childbirth and family. The youngest daughter of Cronus and Rhea. Sister and wife of Zeus. Being the goddess of marriage, she frequently tried to get revenge on Zeus' lovers and their children. Her symbols include the peacock, cuckoo, and cow.
Poseidon	Neptune		God of the seas, water, storms, hurricanes, earthquakes and horses. The middle son of Cronus and Rhea. Brother of Zeus and Hades. Married to the Nereid Amphitrite; although, as with many of the male Greek gods, he had many lovers. His symbols include the trident, horse, bull, and dolphin.
Demeter	Ceres		Goddess of the harvest, fertility, agriculture, nature and the seasons. She presided over grains and the fertility of the earth. The middle daughter of Cronus and Rhea. Also the lover of Zeus and Poseidon, and the mother of Persephone, Despoine, Arion. Her symbols include the poppy, wheat, torch, cornucopia, and pig.
Apollo	Apollo		God of Sun, light, prophecy, philosophy, archery, truth, inspiration, poetry, music, arts, manly beauty, medicine, healing, and plague. The son of Zeus and Leto, and the twin brother of Artemis. His symbols include bow and arrow, lyre, raven, swan and wolf.
Artemis	Diana		Goddess of the hunt, the wilderness, virginity, the Moon, archery, childbirth, protection and plague. The daughter of Zeus and Leto, and the twin sister of Apollo. Her symbols include the Moon, horse, deer, hound, she-bear, snake, cypress tree, and bow and arrow.
Ares	Mars		God of war, violence, bloodshed and manly virtues. The son of Zeus and Hera, all the other gods despised him except Aphrodite. His Latin name, Mars, gave us the word "martial". His symbols include the boar, serpent, dog, vulture, spear, and shield.
Athena	Minerva		Goddess of wisdom, handicraft, and warfare. The daughter of Zeus and the Oceanid Metis, she rose from her father's head fully grown and in full battle armor. Her symbols include the owl and the olive tree.
Hephaestus	Vulcan		Master blacksmith and craftsman of the gods; god of the forge, craftsmanship, invention, fire and volcanoes. The son of Hera, either by Zeus or through parthenogenesis. Married to Aphrodite. His Latin name, Vulcan, gave us the word "volcano". His symbols include fire, anvil, axe, donkey, hammer, tongs, and quail.
Aphrodite	Venus		Goddess of love, pleasure, passion, procreation, fertility, beauty and desire. The daughter of Zeus and the Oceanid or Titaness Dione, or perhaps born from the sea foam after Uranus' blood dripped into the sea after being castrated by his youngest son, Cronus, who then threw his father's genitals into the sea. Married to Hephaestus, although she had many adulterous affairs, most notably with Ares. Her name gave us the word "aphrodisiac", while her Latin name, Venus, gave us the word "venereal". Her symbols include the dove, bird, apple, bee, swan, myrtle, and rose.
Hermes	Mercury		Messenger of the gods; god of travel, commerce, communication, borders, eloquence, diplomacy, thieves, and games. He was also the guide of dead souls. The son of Zeus and the nymph Maia. The second-youngest Olympian, just older than Dionysus. His symbols include the caduceus (staff entwined with two snakes), winged sandals and cap, and tortoise (whose shell he used to invent the lyre).
Most lists of the "twelve Olympians" consist of the above eleven plus either Hestia or Dionysus
Hestia	Vesta		Goddess of the hearth, fire and of the right ordering of domesticity and the family; she was born into the first Olympian generation and was one of the original twelve Olympians. She is the first child of Cronus and Rhea, the elder sister of Hades, Demeter, Poseidon, Hera, and Zeus. Some lists of the Twelve Olympians omit her in favor of Dionysus, but the speculation that she gave her throne to him in order to keep the peace seems to be a modern invention.
Dionysus	Liber		God of wine, the grapevine, fertility, festivity, ecstasy, madness and resurrection. Patron god of the art of theatre. The son of Zeus and the mortal Theban princess Semele, and the youngest Olympian god. Married to the Cretan princess Ariadne. His symbols include the grapevine, ivy, cup, tiger, panther, leopard, dolphin, goat, and pinecone.

== Genealogy ==
Family tree of the major Olympians

Gaia
Uranus
Uranus's genitals	Coeus	Phoebe	Cronus	Rhea
Leto	ZEUS	HERA	POSEIDON	Hades	DEMETER	HESTIA
APOLLO	ARTEMIS	a
b
ARES	HEPHAESTUS
Metis
ATHENA
Maia
HERMES
Semele
DIONYSUS
Dione
a	b
APHRODITE

== See also ==
- Dii Consentes, the Roman equivalent of the twelve Olympians
- Family tree of the Greek gods
- Interpretatio graeca, including a table of mythological equivalents
- List of Greek mythological characters
- Supreme Council of Ethnikoi Hellenes
- Hellenismos
- Olympia
- Greek mythology in popular culture
- Olympian spirits
- Æsir
- Tuatha Dé Danann
- Anunnaki
- Elohim
- Adityas
