= Evangelical Church of Greece =

Christian denomination

- Classification: Protestant
- Orientation: Evangelical/Presbyterian
- Polity: Presbyterian with Congregational elements
- Associations: World Communion of Reformed Churches; Pan-Hellenic Evangelical Alliance; World Evangelical Alliance; World Council of Churches
- Region: Greece
- Origin: 1858; Athens, Greece
- Congregations: 30
- Members: 5,000–6,000
- Official website: GEC.gr

The Evangelical Church of Greece (Note: Greek: Ευαγγελική Εκκλησία της Ελλάδος, Evangeliki Ekklisia tis Ellados, ΕΕΕ) (ECG; until 2014: Greek Evangelical Church, GEC (Note: Ελληνική Ευαγγελική Εκκλησία, Elliniki Evangeliki Ekklisia, ΕΕΕ)) is a Presbyterian denomination in Greece. It was the first Protestant church established in the country.

== History ==
The Greek Evangelical Church dates back to 1858 when the first Greek Evangelical, Michail Kalapothakis started publishing the magazine Astir tis Anatolis (Star of the East) which is still published today. He gathered a group of followers thus forming the first Greek Evangelical community and organized Sunday School for children as well as issuing the Efimeris ton Paidon (Newspaper of the Children) in 1868. The first Greek Evangelical Church was built in 1871 in the center of Athens, which was demolished and rebuilt in 1956 due to the increasing number of followers. Greek Evangelicalism spread also through the Greeks in the Ottoman Empire, the first Greek Evangelical community in Asia Minor was founded in 1867. Today there are 30 Greek Evangelical Churches in Greece, 3 in Cyprus and 5 in the Greek diaspora.

== Theology ==
The Evangelical Church of Greece is theologically Calvinist. Core beliefs are typical of most traditional Protestant denominations: they consider the Bible the highest and only binding authority on matters of doctrine and practice (sola scriptura) and recognize two sacraments (baptism and holy communion). Their Confession of Faith closely follows the Puritan Westminster Confession and consists of 28 articles.

== Affiliations ==
The Evangelical Church of Greece is affiliated with the World Communion of Reformed Churches and the World Council of Churches.

GEC is part of the Pan-Hellenic Evangelical Alliance which is part of the World Evangelical Alliance.

== See also ==
- Protestantism in Greece
- Religion in Greece
