= Protestantism in Greece =

Protestants in Greece, including the Greek Evangelical Church and Free Evangelical Churches, stand at about 30,000. Assemblies of God, International Church of the Foursquare Gospel and other Pentecostal churches of the Greek Synod of Apostolic Church has 12,000 members.

The independent Free Apostolic Church of Pentecost is the biggest Protestant denomination in Greece with 120 churches.

Protestant/Evangelical missionaries were active in Greece since 1819, one of the first being Jonas King. Today there is a sizeable Evangelical community in the city of Katerini.

== Notable Greek Protestants ==
- Iacob Heraclid, soldier
- Michail Kalapothakis, theologian
- Martha Hooper Blackler Kalopothakes, missionary
