= Feraferia =

Neopagan religion

- Feraferia religious symbol
- Formation: 1967
- Type: New religious movement
- Headquarters: Cotati, California
- Official language: English
- Founder: Frederick Adams
- Affiliations: Goddess movement
- Website: feraferia.org

Feraferia is a Neopagan religion with a community that began in Southern California and now spans the United States and parts of Europe. Members of this community practice Hellenic-inspired Goddess worship.

The founder of the group, Fredrick McLaren Charles Adams II, experienced an ecstatic religious conversion in 1956 when he became viscerally certain of the primacy of the Goddess. Among many other intellectuals with whom he corresponded and exchanged ideas, Adams met and was deeply influenced by Robert Graves and his book The White Goddess. In 1957, Adams founded the classically inspired Fellowship of Hesperides and in 1959, he started a multi-family intentional community in Sierra Madre, California.

Following on the Fellowship of Hesperides, Feraferia was established in 1967 as a nonprofit corporation in the State of California, and as such, is one of the oldest organizations of Neopaganism in the United States. The name Feraferia is a combination of the Latin root words fera, denoting “wild” or “feral,” and feria, or “festival.” The religion is based on the celebration of wild nature with a focus on the maiden Goddess Kore. For six years, Adams published the newsletter Korythalia once a month with inspiration and updates for Feraferians.

During the 1970s, Adams, with Carroll "Poke" Runyon of the Ordo Templi Astartes, and Oberon Zell of the Church of All Worlds formed The Council of Themis, the first attempt to unite various hermetic, Neopagan, and ceremonial magic groups in the United States. Adams, and Feraferia, were represented in Runyon's early Neopagan magazine, The 7th Ray, with Adams illustrating as well as writing expositions on the Feraferia approach to what later became known as the Goddess movement.

In 1989, Feraferia member and award-winning filmmaker Jo Carson began shooting and directing the documentary film Dancing With Gaia to explore the meaning of Feraferia through words and images. The film features interviews with Adams and other prominent Neopagans and visits to sacred sites around the world.

Adams died in August 2008, followed by his wife and co-founder of Feraferia, Lady Svetlana of Feraferia (Svetlana Butyrin) in 2010. Adams named Jo Carson as literary executor of his estate and charged her with the mission of disseminating the messages of Feraferia to other Neopagan communities and the world.

Carson has since published Celebrate Wildness: Magic, Mirth and Love on the Feraferia Path, a handbook of Feraferia and a showcase for Adams’ prolific artwork. Carson has presented on aspects of Feraferia numerous times at the Neopagan conference PantheaCon, and maintains a physical library for and about Feraferia as well as an extensive website with more than 150 articles. Currently, Carson is working on a new publication, The Green Pulse Oracle: A Tool for Eco-Psychic Insight, based on a system of oracular glyphs first developed by Adams.
