= European Congress of Ethnic Religions =

Interfaith organization (1998-)

- Formation: 1998
- Founder: Jonas Trinkūnas
- Type: Modern paganism
- Location: Vivulskio 27-4, LT-03114 Vilnius, Lithuania
- Members: 11 organisations (2023)
- President: Uģis Nastevičs
- Website: ecer-org.eu

European Congress of Ethnic Religions (ECER) is an organisation for cooperation among associations that promote the ethnic religions of Europe. The primary goal of the ECER is the strengthening of pre-Christian religious traditions of Europe, emphasizing and fostering their ties with modern pagan movements.

== History ==
A "World Pagan Congress" was hosted in June 1998 in Vilnius, Lithuania, organized by Jonas Trinkūnas of Romuva, a Lithuanian neopagan organization. It was attended by members from a number of neopagan organizations from Europe and North America, as well as observers from the academic field. At the meeting it was decided to make the congress an annual event and to form an organization around it.

The organization's name was the result of a day-long passionate debate. The words "pagan" and "heathen" were rejected because of their perceived cultural associations with immorality, violence and backwardness. "Indigenous" was seen as satisfactory on a linguistic level, but was voted down with regard to its established use by groups distinguished from European colonizers. Other suggestions were terms along the lines of "old religion" and "ancestral religion". "Ethnic", the Greek equivalent to the Latin paganus in early Christian sources, was eventually agreed on. The word's history and the connection to ethnology appealed to most participants.

To avoid misunderstandings, the founding declaration of the organization makes clear that ethnic here does not refer to ethnic politics. The founding member Denis Dornoy also clarified this in the organization's newsletter The Oaks in 1999:

Is ethnic connected with ethnic cleansing? Is it another pure race ideology? Do you have to belong to a long-lost people to be ethnic? Isn't ethnic a subject for white-haired academics? Ethnic is none of the above, and its meaning is far simpler. Ethnos is Greek, meaning people, and ethnic means related to a particular people, i.e., anything that defines a people: its language, customs, daily behaviour, food ... or spiritual outlook. We call this last point ethnic religion. It is a set of traditions, worship, way of life, related to a people. It often, but not always, involves ancestor worship. Sometimes it is so integrated into everyday life that it cannot even be called "religion" (i.e., belief) according to Western standards.

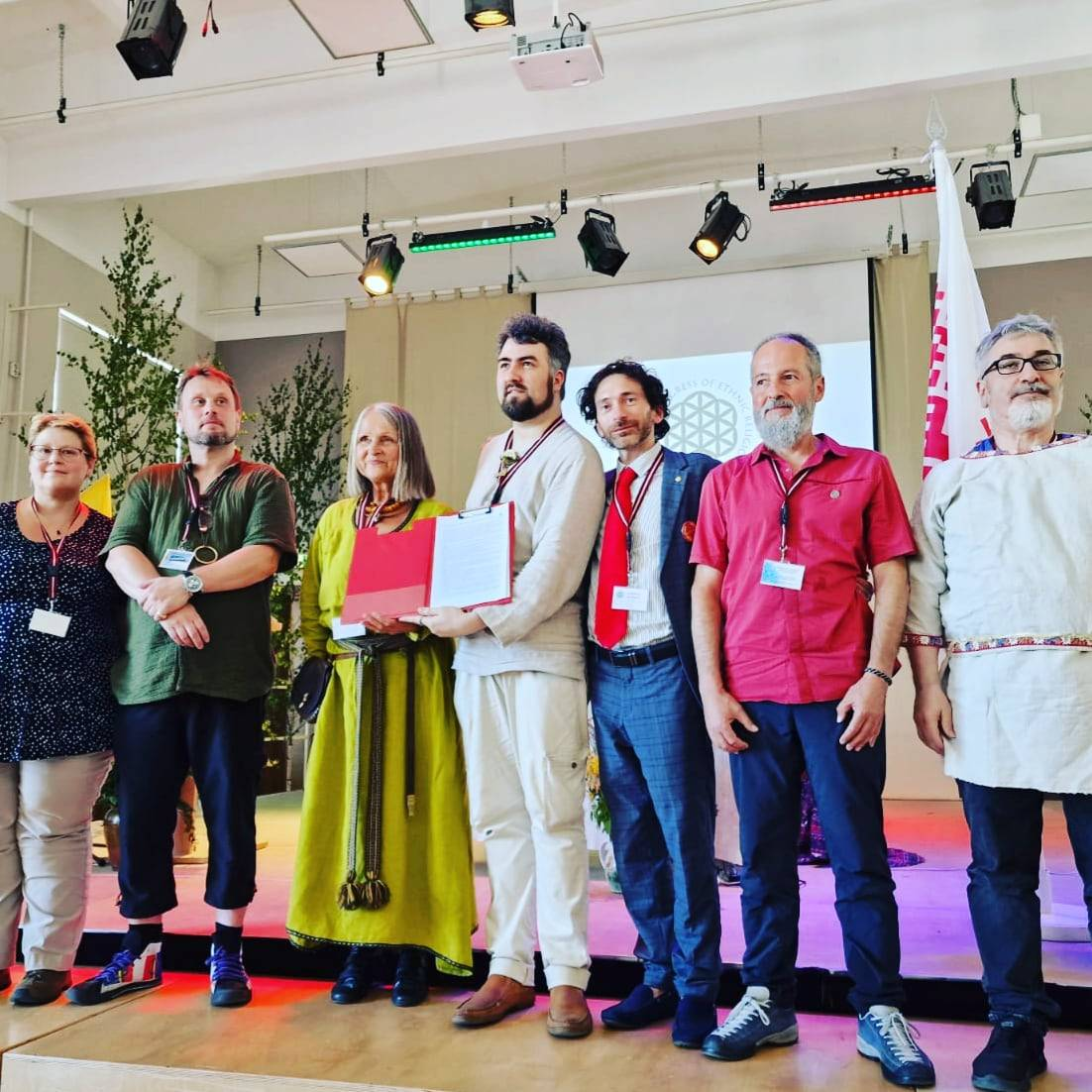
Signing of the Riga Declaration (ECER) 2023

The congress was held under the name "World Congress of Ethnic Religions" from 1999 to 2010. The 2006 and 2009 conferences were held in India, in the spirit of collaboration between Western Neopaganism and Hinduism. The intention of a worldwide scope was "more of a dream than reality", as the congress mostly consisted of representatives of neopagan movements in Europe. To reflect this, the organization was renamed "European Congress of Ethnic Religions" in 2010. The congress was an annual event until 2010, and has since then been held once every two years.

== Members and leadership ==
ECER's website defines the scope of the organization: "By Ethnic Religion, we mean religion, spirituality, and cosmology that is firmly grounded in a particular people's traditions. In our view, this does not include modern occult or ariosophic theories/ideologies, nor syncretic neo-religions."

Since 2023, the president of the ECER is Uģis Nastevičs.

Member organizations represent Baltic, Slavic, Germanic, Greek, and Roman traditions. As of 2023, the member organizations of the ECER were:

- Latvijas Dievturu sadraudze, Latvia
- Associazione Tradizionale Pietas — Pietas, Italy
- Groupe Druidique des Gaules, France
- Objednannia ridnoviriv Ukrajiny, Ukraine
- Związek Wyznaniowy Rodzima Wiara, Poland
- Senovės baltų religinė bendrija Romuva, Lithuania
- Sjamanistisk Forbund, Norway
- Slovanský kruh, Czech Republic
- Societas Hesperiana Pro Cultu Deorum, Italy
- Werkgroep Traditie Vzw, Flanders (Belgium) and the Netherlands
- Ýpato Symvoúlio ton Ellínon Ethnikón, Greece

== Chronology of the congresses ==
Year	Location	Theme/Notes
1998	Vilnius, Lithuania	Foundation of the ECER
1999	Telšiai, Lithuania	laying down a structure and aims for the organisation
2000	Bradesiai, Lithuania	solving administrational issues
2001	Vilnius, Lithuania	with delegates from the Vishva Hindu Parishad
2002	Vilnius, Lithuania	"the continuity of ethnic religions in the modern world"
2003	Vilnius, Lithuania	"Global Initiatives for Ethnic Cultures and Religions"
2004	Athens, Greece	"The High Values Of The Pre-Christian Ethnic Traditions and Religions"
2005	Antwerp, Flanders	"Spirituality and Tradition in an Anti-Traditional World"
2006	Jaipur, India	"Spirituality Beyond Religions" in cooperation with the International Centre of Cultural Studies and the World Congress of Elders of Ancient Cultures and Traditions
2007	Riga-Jūrmala-Sigulda, Latvia	"The Spirit Will See New Light in the Turn of Ages"
2008	Poznań-Głogów, Poland	"Ethnic Religions in Modern Europe"
2009	Nagpur, India	"Renaissance of the Ancient Traditions: Challenges and Solutions"
2010	Bologna, Italy	"Ethics in Contemporary World"
2012	Odense, Denmark	"What can Ethnic religions do for Europe – and what can Europe do for the Ethnic religions"
2014	Vilnius, Lithuania	"Mother Earth, Unite us"
2016	Prague, Czech Republic	With the participation of Czech deputy Minister of Culture
2018	Rome, Italy	With the Joint celebration of the Natale di Roma, a festival linked to the foundation of Rome
2023	Riga-Lokstene, Latvia	"Rights in One's Native Land" with the adoption of the Rīga Declaration
2025	Athens, Greece	"The Contribution of Ethnic Religions to the formation of European Identity" with the adoption of the Athens Declaration
