= Supreme Council of Ethnic Hellenes =

Non-profit Hellenic neopagan organisation established in Greece in 1997

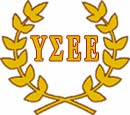
- Formation: 1997
- Type: Non-profit, Hellenic Ethnic Religion
- Location: Athens, Greece
- Members: 2,000
- Key people: Vlassis G. Rassias
- Website: http://www.ysee.gr/

The Supreme Council of Ethnic Hellenes (Greek: Ύπατο Συμβούλιο των Ελλήνων Εθνικών, Ýpato Symvoúlio to̱n Ellí̱no̱n Ethnikó̱n), commonly referred to by its acronym YSEE, is a non-profit Hellenic organisation established in Greece in 1997. Its primary goal is the protection and restoration of the Hellenic ethnic religion in contemporary Greek society.

The group itself estimates that some 2,000 Greeks practice the Hellenic ethnic religion and another 50,000 have "some sort of interest". The followers of the Hellenic ethnic religion face varying degrees of discrimination in Greece, which has an overwhelmingly Orthodox Christian population. One of YSEE's main goals is to obtain legal recognition for the Hellenic ethnic religion.

YSEE is a founding member of the European Congress of Ethnic Religions (ECER) and hosted its seventh Congress in June 2004. YSEE has also been member of the European Union's action program to combat discrimination.

In 2017, the YSEE accomplished one of their goals and the Hellenic religion received legal status and was instated the "known religion" status from Greece.

== Principles ==
The gods have emerged from the “True Being” as a simple multiplication of itself into separate entities, and for this reason, they retain all its qualities, which are immortality, infinity, and knowledge. The mission of the gods is the establishment and maintenance of the unity and the order of the Cosmos. Thus the true gods are perfect beings that impose order and possess immortality and knowledge. They infuse the world without any obstructions by acting on it. They are subject to the natural laws that they serve, and they partake in the eternal rebirth and continuous synthesis and decomposition of the forms. As to their nature, the true and natural gods are perfect, virtuous, immortal, unchangeable, infinite, just, all-wise, eternal, non-personal, unifying, ethereal and permeate all matter.

== Practices ==
=== Altars ===
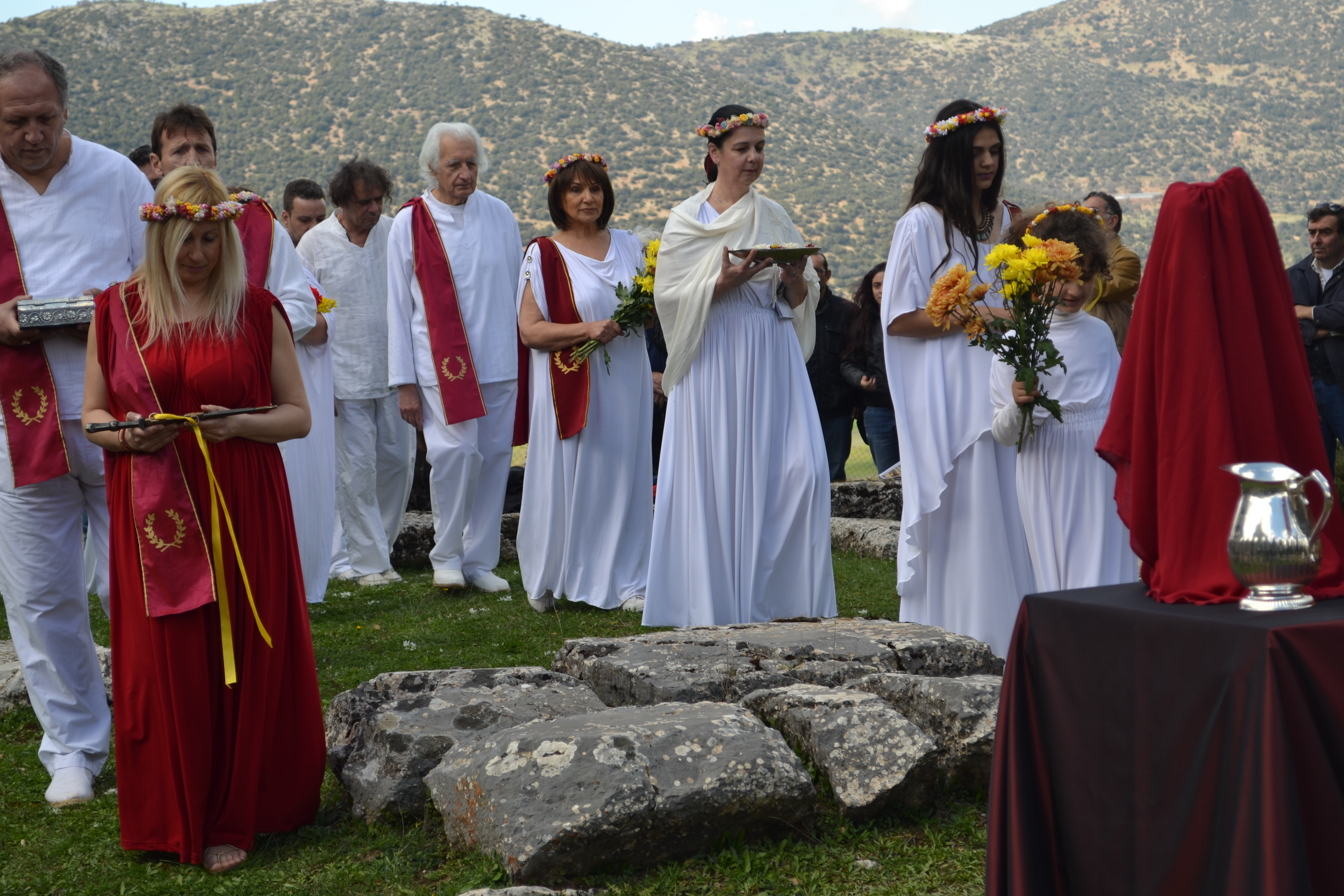
YSEE's Spring Equinox 2016 ritual at an ancient temple of Goddess Artemis in Peloponnese.

The Hellenic Ethnic Religion performs its ritual on altars and hearths, depending on the nature of the deities worshipped at the time. For the Olympian gods, altars are used, which are sanctified surfaces raised above the ground. For chthonic deities and ancestral spirits, they use hearths, which are sanctified surfaces on the ground or in pits. In Hellenic Ethnic Religion, the altar is the most sacred point, the abode of a deity, “where the altars are, that is where the gods are." Because of their nature the altars are points of refuge (asylum), and whoever touches them is considered invulnerable, as if they were “holding the hand of the gods”.

=== Statues ===
The only thing that can be equated in holiness with the altar for Hellenes is the sacred statue (Greek: Άγαλμα). A statue is every sculpted or other (even natural) pleasing form which is defined as the icon or symbol of the deity. Either natural, (for example, unworked stones, meteorite etc.) or worked by human hand (sculpted or cast) and of any material (marble, wood, common or precious metal, clay, etc.) for a statue to be “raised” to devotional it must first be sanctified in a special ritual. After the sanctification which is also called “opening of the eyes”, the statue is now the abode of divinity, like the altar, and thus it requires respectful handling.

== Outside of Greece ==
In 2007, members of YSEE in the United States founded the Hellenic Council YSEE of America which is now a recognized non-for profit organization based in Astoria, a New York City neighborhood with a large Greek-American community.

== See also ==
- European Congress of Ethnic Religions
- Persecution of ancient Greek religion
- Gemistus Pletho
- Religion in Greece
- Separation of church and state in Greece
