= European Conference of Reformed Churches =

Calvinist conference in Europe

The European Conference of Reformed Churches (EUCRC) is a federation of churches Reformed Calvinists in Europe, formed in 2007. It is the European regional branch of the International Conference of Reformed Churches.

The organization's main objective is cooperation between Reformed churches for evangelism and theological education.

== Member list ==
As of December 24, 2021, the European Conference of Reformed Churches is made up of the following 8 members:

- Christian Reformed Churches in the Netherlands
- Evangelical Presbyterian Church in England and Wales
- Evangelical Presbyterian Church in Ireland
- Free Church of Scotland
- Free Church of Scotland (Continuing)
- Reformed Churches in the Netherlands (Liberated) (suspended since 2017)
- Reformed Presbyterian Church of Ireland
- Reformed Churches in Spain

Although not officially a member, the Evangelical Presbyterian Church of Ukraine and Ukrainian Evangelical Reformed Church are represented at CEIR meetings.
