= Union of Evangelical Reformed Churches of Ukraine =

Ecumenical organization

The Union of Evangelical Reformed Churches of Ukraine is a national ecumenical organization, bringing together Presbyterian and Continental Reformed denominations in Ukraine.

It was formed in 2001 by Evangelical Presbyterian Church of Ukraine and Ukrainian Evangelical Reformed Church.

== History ==
The Reformed Faith arrived in Ukraine since the 16th century, having spread throughout the territory that would form the Polish–Lithuanian Commonwealth. The region with the highest concentration of pensioners until the First World War was Transcarpathia, which formerly belonged to Austria-Hungary. However, after the formation of the Soviet Union, religious freedom was severely restricted in the Ukrainian territory.

Beginning in 1989, missionary Fylymon Semenyuk began missionary works in Rivne and Stepan, with support from Reformed Churches in the Netherlands (Liberated). His mission led to the formation of the Ukrainian Evangelical Reformed Church (IERU). Later, the denomination spread throughout the country, reaching Kyiv, Khmelnytskyi, Svaliava and Tavrian.

Beginning in 1993, missionaries from Mission to the World, the missionary agency of Presbyterian Church in America began church planting work. Odesa was the first city in which the missionaries settled and the first in which a Presbyterian church was established after 1994. Subsequently, other churches were planted in Kyiv, Lviv and Kherson. This mission led to the formation of the Evangelical Presbyterian Church of Ukraine (IEPU).

In 2001 IERU and IEPU, another reformed denomination in the country, formed the Union of Evangelical Reformed Churches of Ukraine (UERCU), recognized by the government in October 2001. although the previous denominations continue to exist independently, this union holds joint meetings annually. In the same year of its foundation, the UERCU started the Reformed Evangelical Seminary. Since then, the seminary has served to train pastors of both denominations.
