= Religion in Europe =

Religion in Europe (Pew Research Center 2020)
1. Christianity (67.1%)
2. Unaffiliated (25.3%)
3. Islam (6.00%)
4. Other religions (1.60%)

Importance of Religion in Europe (results of a 2008/2009 Gallup poll)

Predominance of Christianity in countries across Europe (2010)

Religion has been a major influence on the societies, cultures, traditions, philosophies, artistic expressions and laws within present-day Europe. The largest religion in Europe is Christianity. However, irreligion and practical secularisation are also prominent in some countries. According to 2020 data from Pew Research Centre, 67.1% of Europe's population follows Christianity, and 25.3% are religiously unaffiliated. Other religions include Islam (6%), Buddhism (0.3%), Hinduism (0.3%) and Jews (0.2%). In most European countries, Christianity is the majority faith. In Estonia, Netherlands and Czech Republic, the majority are religiously unaffiliated. Christianity forms plurality ie as Christianity ceased to be the majority faith in the United Kingdom, France, where it had previously been the dominant religion. Islam forms a majority in Bosnia and Herzegovina and Kosovo. In Albania, Islam forms plurality where it had earlier been majority.

Little is known about the prehistoric religion of Neolithic Europe. Bronze and Iron Age religion in Europe as elsewhere was predominantly polytheistic and included Ancient Greek religion, Ancient Roman religion, Slavic paganism, Finnish paganism, Celtic polytheism and Germanic paganism. Modern revival movements of these religions, and religions influenced by them, include Heathenism, Rodnovery, Romuva, Druidry, Wicca, and Hetanism.

The Roman Empire officially adopted Christianity in AD 380. Most of Europe underwent Christianisation during the Early Middle Ages, with the process being essentially complete with the Christianisation of Lithuania in the High Middle Ages, with the exception of Al-Andalus. The notion of "Europe" and the "Western World" has been intimately connected with the concept of "Christendom", and many even consider Christianity as the unifying belief that created a European identity, especially since Christianity in the Middle East was marginalized by the rise of Islam from the 8th century. This confrontation led to the Crusades, which ultimately failed militarily, but were an important step in the emergence of a European identity based on religion. Despite this, traditions of folk religion continued at all times, largely independent from institutional religion or dogmatic theology.

The Great Schism of the 11th century and Reformation of the 16th century tore apart Christendom into hostile factions, and following the Age of Enlightenment of the 18th century, atheism and agnosticism have spread across Europe. Nineteenth-century Orientalism contributed to a certain popularity of Hinduism and Buddhism, and the 20th century brought increasing syncretism, New Age, and various new religious movements divorcing spirituality from inherited traditions for many Europeans. Recent times have seen increased secularisation and religious pluralism. Smaller religions include Dharmic religions, Judaism, and some East Asian religions, which are found in their largest groups in Britain, France, and Kalmykia.

== Religiosity ==
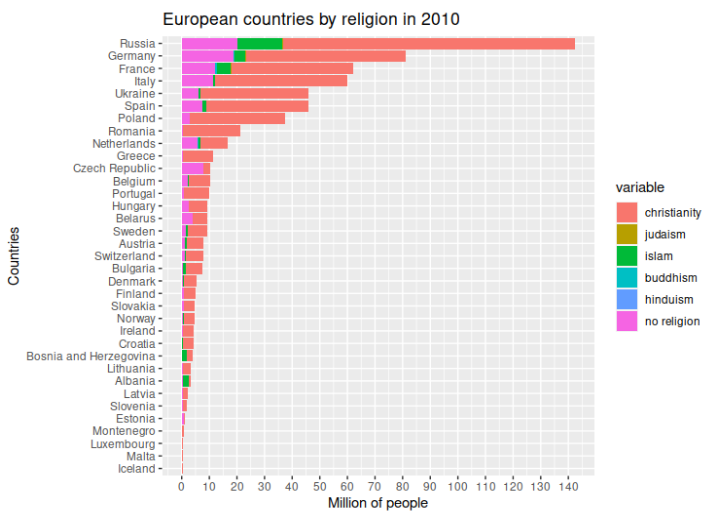
Data: https://www.kaggle.com/umichigan/world-religions

Some European countries have experienced a decline in church membership and church attendance. A relevant example of this trend is Sweden where the Church of Sweden, previously the state-church until 2000, claimed to have 82.9% of the Swedish population as its flock in 2000. Surveys showed this had dropped to 72.9% by 2008 and to 56.4% by 2019. Moreover, in the 2005 Eurobarometer survey 23% of the Swedish population said that they do not believe there is any sort of spirit, God or life force and in the 2010 Eurobarometer survey 34% said the same.

=== Gallup survey 2008–2009 ===
During 2008–2009, a Gallup survey asked in several countries the question "Is religion important in your daily life?" The table and map below shows percentage of people who answered "Yes" to the question.

Results of a 2008/2009 Gallup survey on whether respondents said that religion was "important in [their] daily life": 0%–9%; 10%–19% (Estonia, Sweden, Denmark); 20%–29% (Norway, Czech Republic, United Kingdom, Finland); 30%–39% (France, Netherlands, Belgium, Bulgaria, Russia, Belarus, Luxembourg, Hungary, Albania, Latvia); 40%–49% (Germany, Switzerland, Lithuania, Kazakhstan, Ukraine, Slovenia, Slovakia, Spain); 50%–59% (Azerbaijan, Serbia, Ireland, Austria); 60%–69%; 70%–79% (Croatia, Montenegro, Greece, Portugal, Italy, Moldova, Armenia, Poland, Cyprus, North Macedonia, Bosnia and Herzegovina); 80%–89% (Georgia, Turkey, Romania, Malta); 90%–100% (Kosovo); No data

Importance of Religion in Europe by Gallup Poll (2008–2009)
Country	Percentage
Estonia	16%
Sweden	17%
Denmark	19%
Norway	21%
Czech Republic	21%
United Kingdom	27%
Finland	28%
France	30%
Netherlands	33%
Belgium	33%
Bulgaria	34%
Russia	34%
Belarus	34%
Luxembourg	39%
Hungary	39%
Albania	39%
Latvia	39%
Germany	40%
Switzerland	41%
Lithuania	42%
Kazakhstan	43%
Ukraine	46%
Slovenia	47%
Slovakia	47%
Spain	49%
Azerbaijan	50%
Serbia	54%
Ireland	54%
Austria	55%
Croatia	70%
Montenegro	71%
Greece	71%
Portugal	72%
Italy	72%
Moldova	72%
Armenia	73%
Poland	75%
Cyprus	75%
North Macedonia	76%
Bosnia and Herzegovina	77%
Georgia	81%
Turkey	82%
Romania	84%
Malta	86%
Kosovo	90%

During 2007–2008, a Gallup poll asked in several countries the question "Does religion occupy an important place in your life?" The table on right shows percentage of people who answered "No".

Lack of Importance of Religion in Europe by Gallup poll (2007–2008)
Country	Percentage
Estonia	84%
Sweden	83%
Denmark	80%
Norway	78%
Azerbaijan	74%
Czech Republic	74%
France	73%
United Kingdom	71%
Finland	69%
Netherlands	66%
Belarus	65%
Russia	63%
Albania	63%
Bulgaria	62%
Latvia	62%
Belgium	61%
Hungary	59%
Slovenia	59%
Spain	59%
Germany	57%
Switzerland	56%
Ukraine	54%
Lithuania	52%
Slovakia	51%
Austria	42%
Ireland	42%
Romania	31%
Serbia	31%
Croatia	30%
Greece	30%
Portugal	27%
Montenegro	27%
Italy	26%
Cyprus	24%
Poland	23%
Bosnia and Herzegovina	19%
North Macedonia	19%
Malta	18%
Moldova	11%
Armenia	10%
Turkey	9%
Georgia	9%

=== Eurobarometer survey 2010 ===
Largest (non-)religious group by EU member state according to Eurobarometer survey 2010. More than 75% Catholic 50–75% Catholic Relative Catholic majority 50–75% Protestant More than 75% Orthodox 50–75% non-religious Relative non-religious majority More than 75% Muslim

The 2010 Eurobarometer survey found that, on average, 51% of the citizens of the EU member states state that they "believe there is a God", 26% "believe there is some sort of spirit or life force" while 20% "don't believe there is any sort of spirit, God or life force". 3% declined to answer. According to a recent study (Dogan, Mattei, Religious Beliefs in Europe: Factors of Accelerated Decline), 47% of French people declared themselves as agnostics in 2003. This situation is often called "Post-Christian Europe". A decrease in religiousness and church attendance in Denmark, Belgium, France, Germany, Netherlands, and Sweden has been noted, despite a concurrent increase in some countries like Greece (2% in 1 year). The Eurobarometer survey must be taken with caution, however, as there are discrepancies between it and national census results. For example, in the United Kingdom, the 2001 census revealed over 70% of the population regarded themselves as "Christian" with only 15% professing to have "no religion", though the wording of the question has been criticized as "leading" by the British Humanist Association. Romania, one of the most religious countries in Europe, witnessed a threefold increase in the number of atheists between 2002 and 2011, as revealed by the most recent national census.

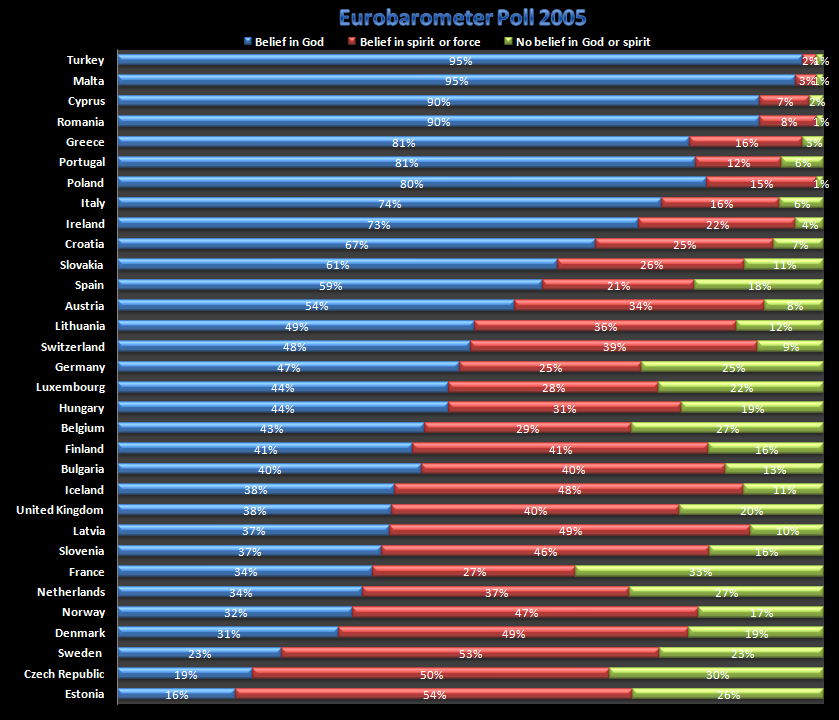
Eurobarometer survey 2005 chart results

The following is a list of European countries ranked by religiosity, based on the rate of belief, according to the Eurobarometer survey 2010. The 2010 Eurobarometer survey asked whether the person "believes there is a God", "believes there is some sort of spirit or life force", or "doesn't believe there is any sort of spirit, God or life force".

Eurobarometer survey 2010
Country	"I believe there is a God"	"I believe there is some sort of spirit or life force"	"I don't believe there is any sort of spirit, God or life force"
Malta	94%	4%	2%
Romania	93%	6%	1%
Cyprus	88%	8%	3%
Poland	79%	14%	5%
Greece	79%	16%	4%
Italy	74%	20%	6%
(Republic of Ireland) Ireland	70%	20%	7%
Portugal	70%	15%	12%
Slovakia	63%	23%	13%
Spain	59%	20%	19%
Lithuania	47%	37%	12%
Luxembourg	46%	22%	24%
Hungary	45%	34%	20%
Austria	44%	38%	12%
Germany	44%	25%	27%
Latvia	38%	48%	11%
United Kingdom	37%	33%	25%
Belgium	37%	31%	27%
Bulgaria	36%	43%	15%
Finland	33%	42%	22%
Slovenia	32%	36%	26%
Denmark	28%	47%	24%
Netherlands	28%	39%	30%
France	27%	27%	40%
Estonia	18%	50%	29%
Sweden	18%	45%	34%
Czech Republic	16%	44%	37%
(European Union) EU27	51%	26%	20%
Turkey (EUCU, not EU)	94%	1%	1%
Croatia (joined EU in 2013)	69%	22%	7%
Switzerland (EFTA, not EU)	44%	39%	11%
Iceland (EFTA, not EU)	31%	49%	18%
Norway (EFTA, not EU)	22%	44%	29%

The decrease in theism is illustrated in the 1981 and 1999 according to the World Values Survey, both for traditionally strongly theist countries (Spain: 86.8%:81.1%; Ireland 94.8%:93.7%) and for traditionally secular countries (Sweden: 51.9%:46.6%; France 61.8%:56.1%; Netherlands 65.3%:58.0%). Some countries nevertheless show increase of theism over the period, Italy 84.1%:87.8%, Denmark 57.8%:62.1%. For a comprehensive study on Europe, see Mattei Dogan's "Religious Beliefs in Europe: Factors of Accelerated Decline" in Research in the Social Scientific Study of Religion.

=== Eurobarometer survey 2019 ===
Self described religion in the European Union (2019)
1. Roman Catholicism (41.0%)
2. Eastern Orthodoxy (10.0%)
3. Protestantism (9.00%)
4. Other Christians (4.00%)
5. Islam (2.00%)
6. Other religion (4.00%)
7. Non believer/Agnosticism (17.0%)
8. Atheism (10.0%)
9. Refusal/Don't know (3.00%)

Largest (non-)religious group by EU member state according to Eurobarometer survey 2019. More than 75% Catholic 50–75% Catholic Relative Catholic majority 50–75% Protestant More than 75% Orthodox 50–75% non-religious Relative non-religious majority 30% Catholic, 30% non-religious (Germany)

According to the 2019 Eurobarometer survey about Religiosity in the European Union, Christianity is the largest religion in the European Union accounting 64% of the EU population, down from 72% in 2012. Catholics are the largest Christian group in EU, accounting for 41% of EU population, while Eastern Orthodox make up 10%, and Protestants make up 9%, and other Christians account for 4% of the EU population. Non believer/Agnostic account 17%, Atheist 10%, and Muslim 2% of the EU population. 3% refuse to answer or didn't know.

Eurobarometer survey 2019
Country	"Atheist"	"Non believer/Agnostic"	"Atheist + Non believer/Agnostic"
Romania	2%	2%	4%
Malta	2%	2%	4%
Cyprus	3%	4%	7%
Poland	5%	4%	9%
Lithuania	3%	6%	9%
Greece	7%	4%	11%
Slovakia	6%	5%	11%
Croatia	6%	5%	11%
Portugal	4%	8%	12%
(Republic of Ireland) Ireland	7%	7%	14%
Italy	5%	9%	14%
Bulgaria	8%	7%	15%
Austria	4%	12%	16%
Slovenia	14%	4%	18%
Latvia	6%	13%	19%
Hungary	3%	17%	20%
Denmark	9%	13%	22%
Finland	10%	14%	24%
Luxembourg	10%	16%	26%
Germany	9%	21%	30%
Belgium	10%	21%	31%
Spain	12%	20%	32%
United Kingdom	19%	20%	39%
France	21%	19%	40%
Estonia	21%	27%	48%
Sweden	16%	34%	50%
Netherlands	11%	41%	52%
Czech Republic	22%	34%	56%
(European Union) EU28	10%	17%	27%

==== Maps ====
Belief "There is a God" per country based on Eurobarometer 2005 survey

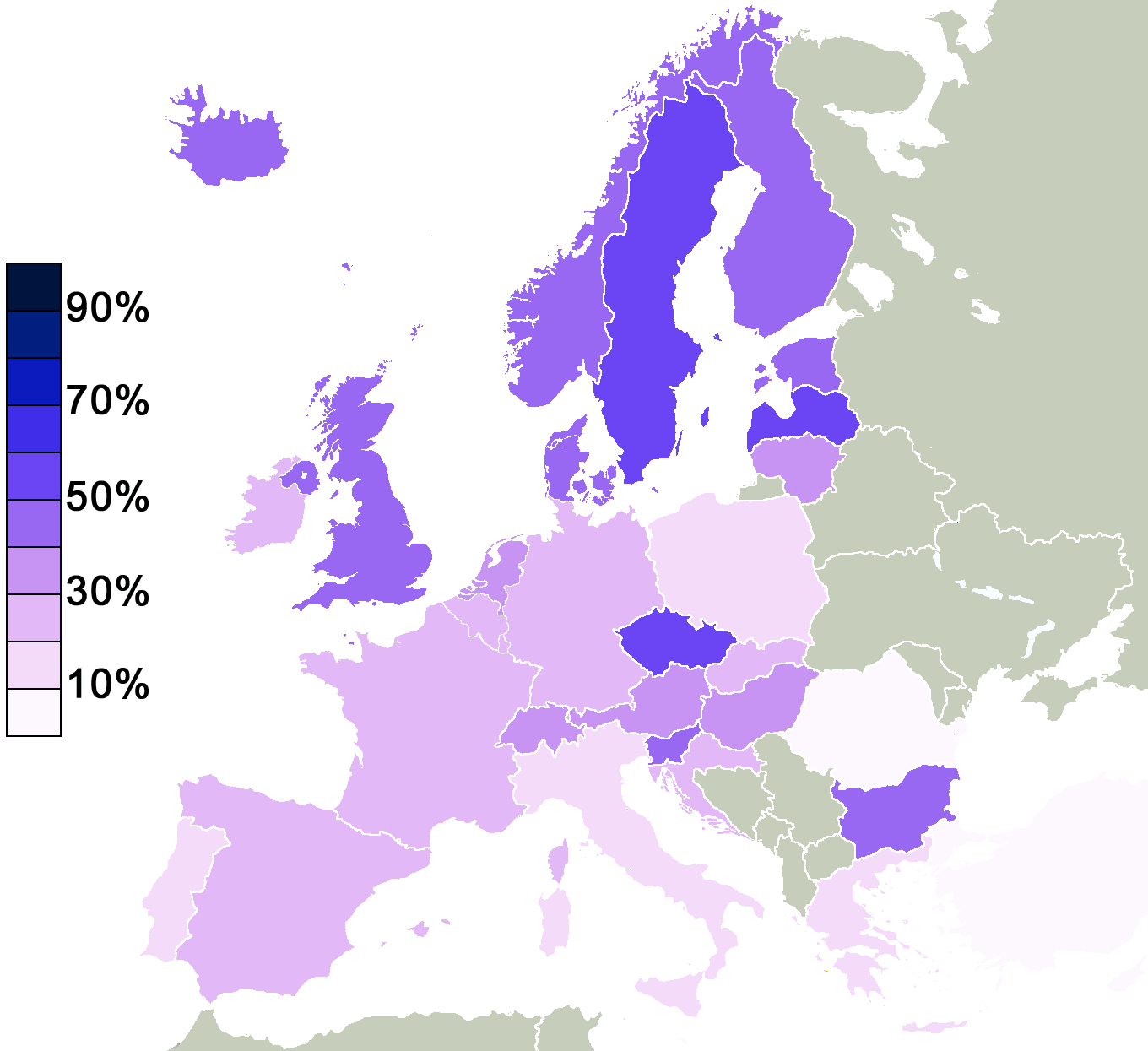
Belief "there is some sort of spirit or life force" per country based on Eurobarometer 2005 survey

No belief in "any sort of spirit, God or life force" per country based on Eurobarometer 2005 survey
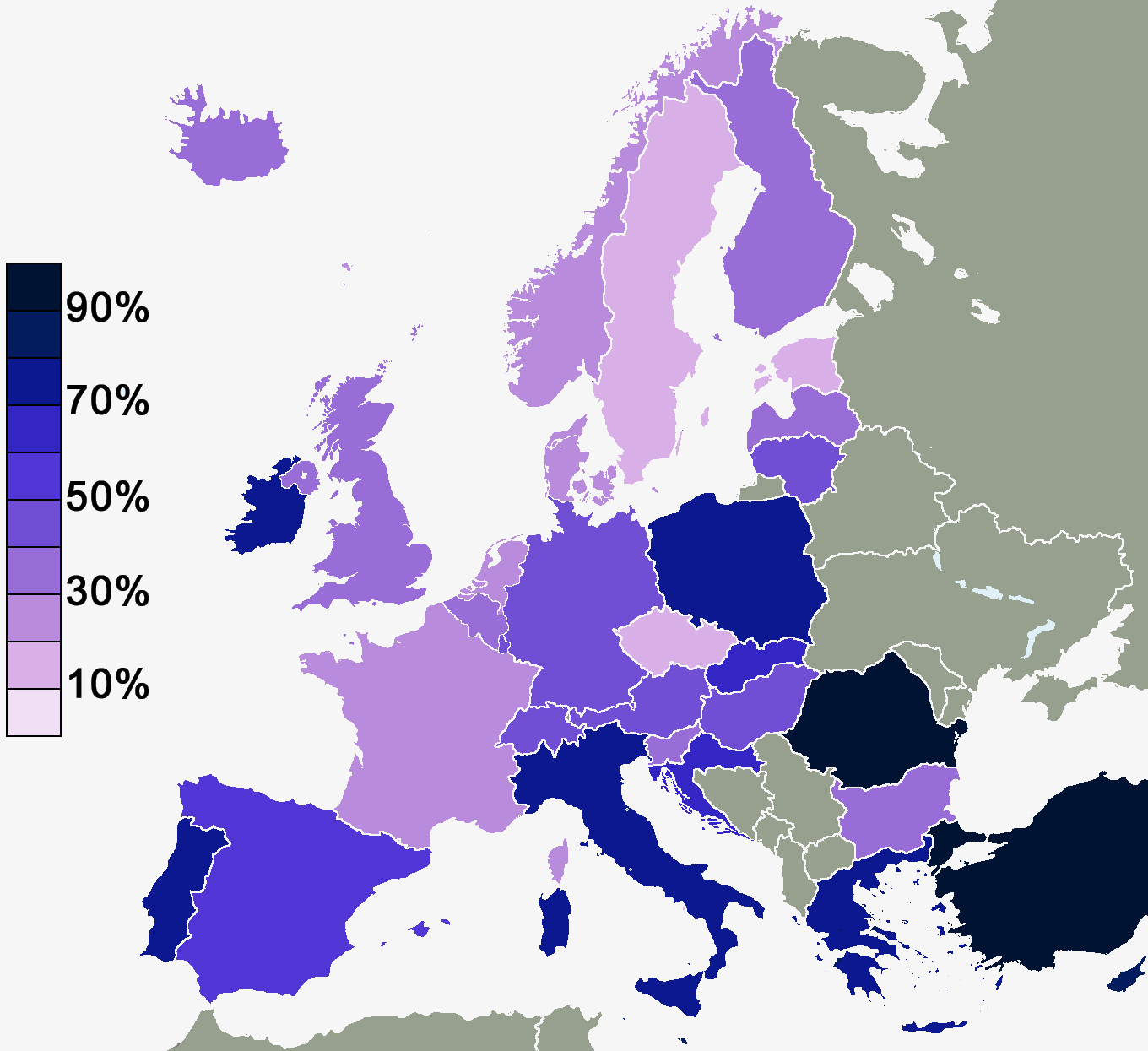
Belief "there is a God" per country based on Eurobarometer 2010 survey

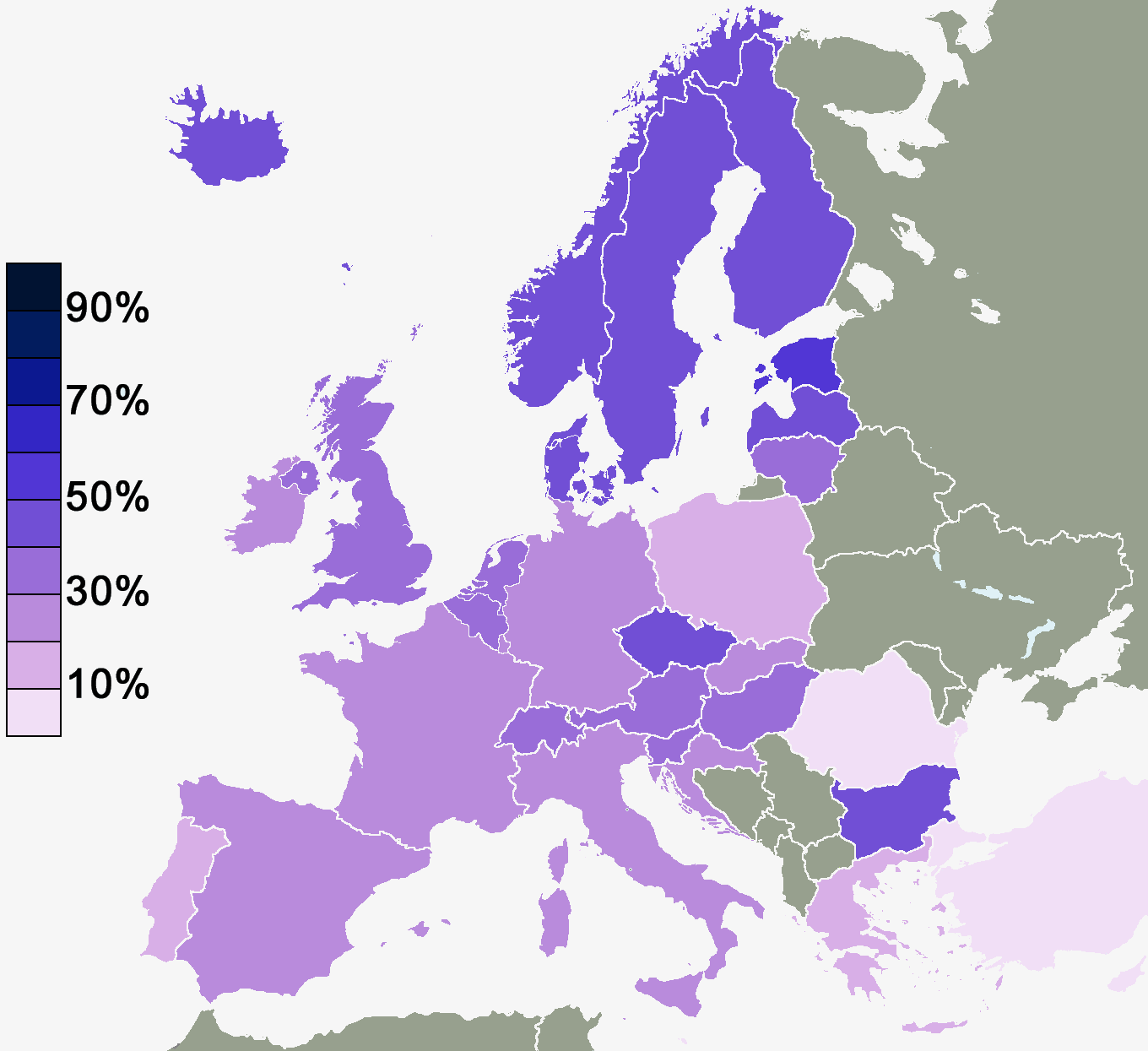
Belief "there is some sort of spirit or life force" per country based on Eurobarometer 2010 survey

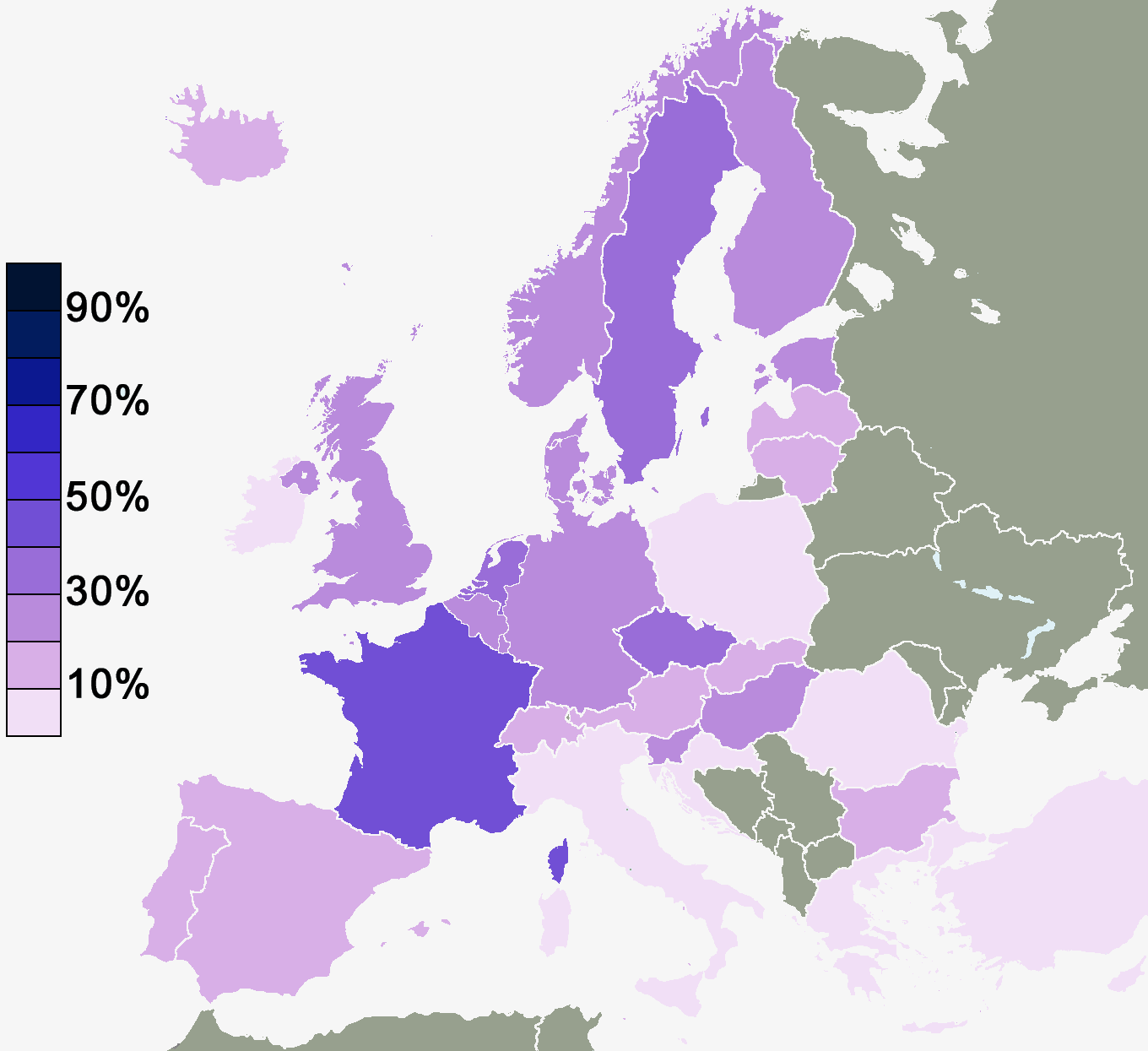
No belief in "any sort of spirit, God or life force" per country based on Eurobarometer 2010 survey

=== Pew Research Poll ===
According to the 2012 Global Religious Landscape survey by the Pew Research Center, 75.2% of the Europe residents are Christians, 18.2% are irreligious, atheist or agnostic, 5.9% are Muslims and 0.2% are Jews, 0.2% are Hindus, 0.2% are Buddhist, and 0.1% adhere to other religions. According to the 2015 Religious Belief and National Belonging in Central and Eastern Europe survey by the Pew Research Center, 57.9% of the Central and Eastern Europeans identified as Orthodox Christians, and according to a 2018 study by the Pew Research Center, 71.0% of Western Europeans identified as Christians, 24.0% identified as religiously unaffiliated and 5% identified as adhere to other religions. According to the same study a large majority (83%) of those who were raised as Christians in Western Europe still identify as such, and the remainder mostly self-identify as religiously unaffiliated.

==== Pew Research Poll ====
Pew Research Poll 2015
Country	Poll 1: Affiliation*			Poll 2: Belief in God**				Poll 3: Non-belief***		
Country	Affiliated Orthodox, Catholic or Muslim	Unaffiliated	Other/DK/ refused	"Absolutely certain"	"Fairly certain"	"Not too/ at all certain"	"Do not believe in God"	Atheist	Agnostic	Nothing in particular
Armenia	97	2	1	94	2	1	2	1		1
Georgia	99	<1	1	93	2	2	1			<1
Bosnia and Herzegovina	96	3	1	90	3	2	3	2	1	
Moldova	95	2	3	89	4	3	3	1		1
Romania	91	1	8	64	28	2	4			1
Serbia	94	4	1	73	16	3	5	2	1	1
Croatia	90	7	3	72	14	5	5	4	2	1
Greece	92	4	4	69	16	7	6	3		1
Poland	88	7	5	45	35	5	8	2	1	4
Lithuania	78	6	17	34	34	7	11	2		4
Ukraine	88	7	5	32	45	6	9	3		4
Bulgaria	91	5	4	30	40	7	17	2	1	2
Latvia	54	21	25	28	34	7	15	3		18
Belarus	86	3	11	26	47	11	9	2		1
Hungary	57	21	22	26	26	7	30	5		16
Russia	81	15	4	25	38	10	15	4	1	10
Czech Republic	22	72	6	13	13	3	66	25	1	46
Estonia	26	45	29	13	24	7	45	9	1	35

* 13% of respondents in Hungary identify as Presbyterian. In Estonia and Latvia, 20% and 19%, respectively, identify as Lutherans. And in Lithuania, 14% say they are "just a Christian" and do not specify a particular denomination. They are included in the "other" category.
** Identified as "don't know/refused" from the "other/idk/ref" column are excluded from this statistic.
*** Figures may not add to subtotals due to rounding.

Pew research poll in 2017 ‡
Country	A holy book (e.g. Bible) is written by men, not the word of God	A holy book is the word of God
Georgia	9%	88%
Armenia	9%	87%
Moldova	10%	87%
Bosnia and Herzegovina	14%	81%
Romania	18%	76%
Ukraine	21%	63%
Poland	24%	61%
Serbia	28%	59%
Greece	28%	58%
Croatia	29%	58%
Russia	30%	58%
Belarus	27%	57%
Bulgaria	41%	43%
Lithuania	43%	42%
Hungary	41%	41%
Latvia	38%	40%
Estonia	58%	26%
Czech Republic	65%	21%

‡ Identified with answers "don't know/refused" are not shown.

== Official religions ==
A number of countries in Europe have official religions, including Greece (Orthodox), Liechtenstein, Malta, Monaco, the Vatican City (Catholic); Armenia (Apostolic Orthodoxy); Denmark, Iceland (Lutheran); and the United Kingdom (England alone) (Anglican). In Switzerland, each of the cantons define their relationship with churches and other religious groups.

Georgia, while technically has no official church per se, has special constitutional agreement with Georgian Orthodox Church, which enjoys de facto privileged status. Much the same applies in Germany with the Evangelical Church and the Roman Catholic Church, and the Jewish community. In Finland, both the Finnish Orthodox Church and the Lutheran Church are official. England, a country of the United Kingdom (UK), has Anglicanism as its official religion. Scotland, another country of the UK, has Presbyterianism as its national church. In Sweden, the national church used to be Lutheranism, but it is no longer "official" since 2000. Azerbaijan, France, Russia, Serbia, and Turkey are officially secular.

== Abrahamic religions ==
=== Christianity ===
Christianity in Europe by percentage (2010)

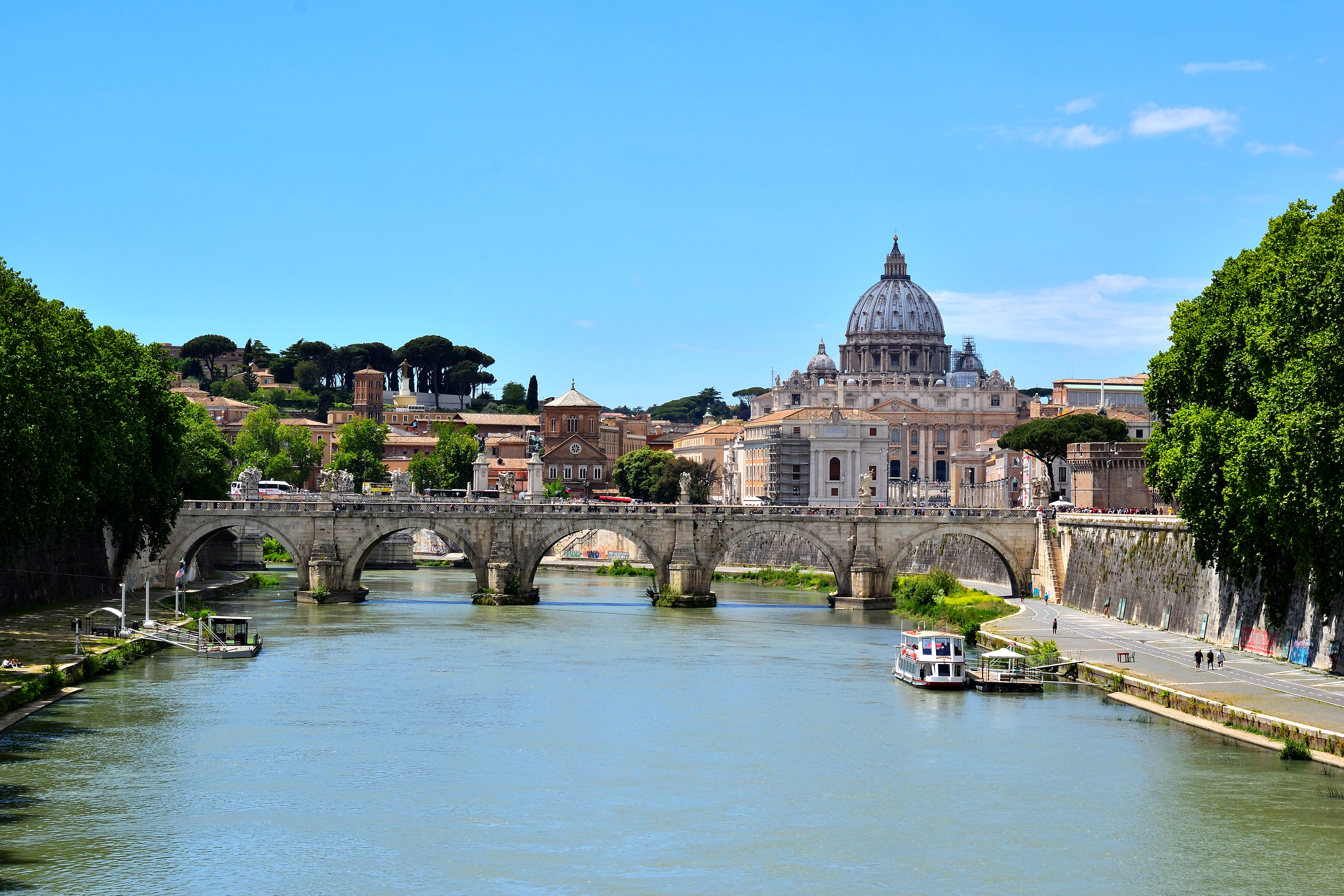
St. Peter's Basilica viewed from the Tiber; the Vatican Hill in the back and Castel Sant'Angelo in Rome to the right. Both the basilica and the hill are part of the sovereign state of Vatican City, the Holy See of the Catholic Church.

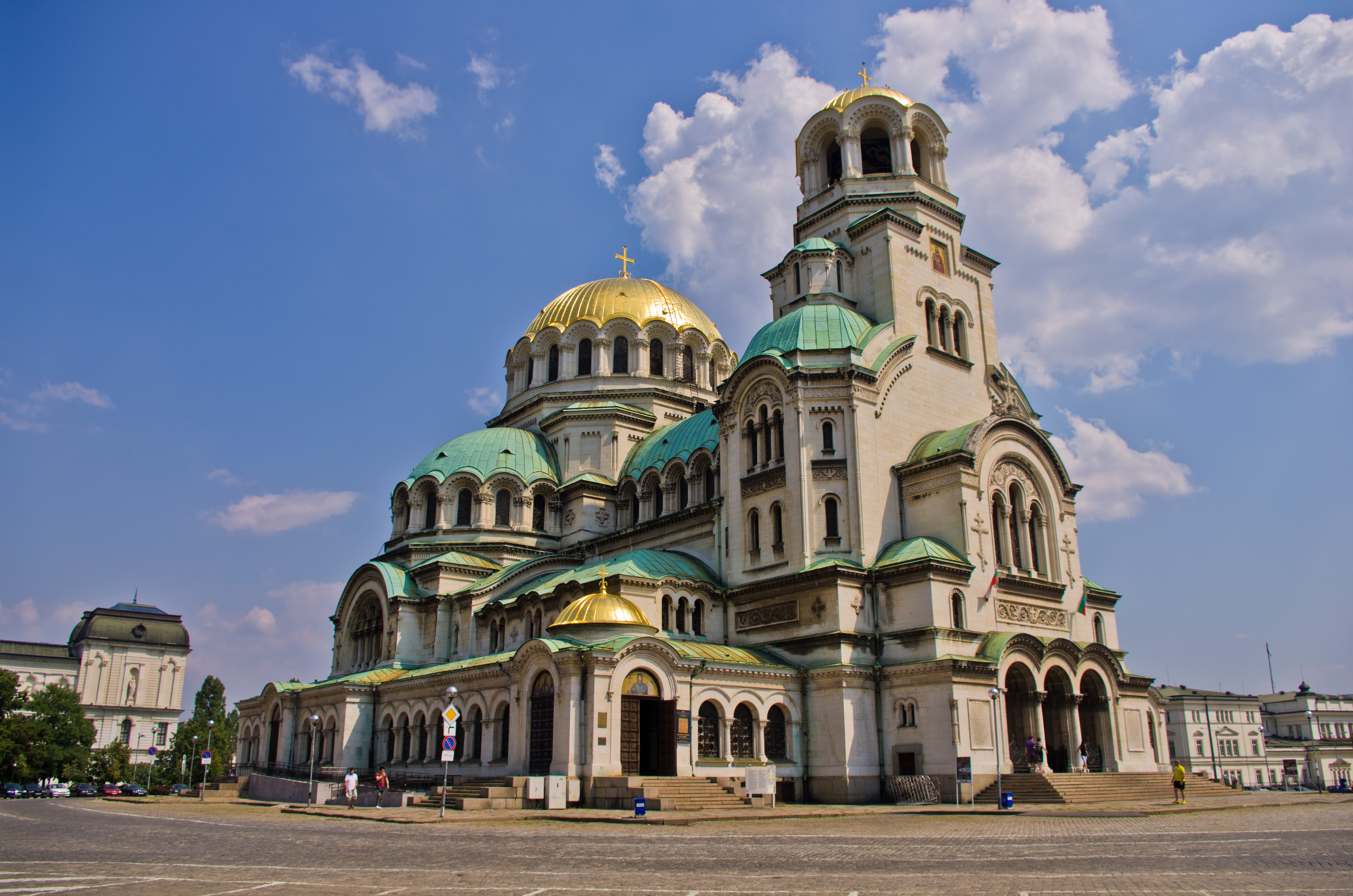
The Alexander Nevsky Cathedral in Sofia is one of the largest Orthodox cathedrals.

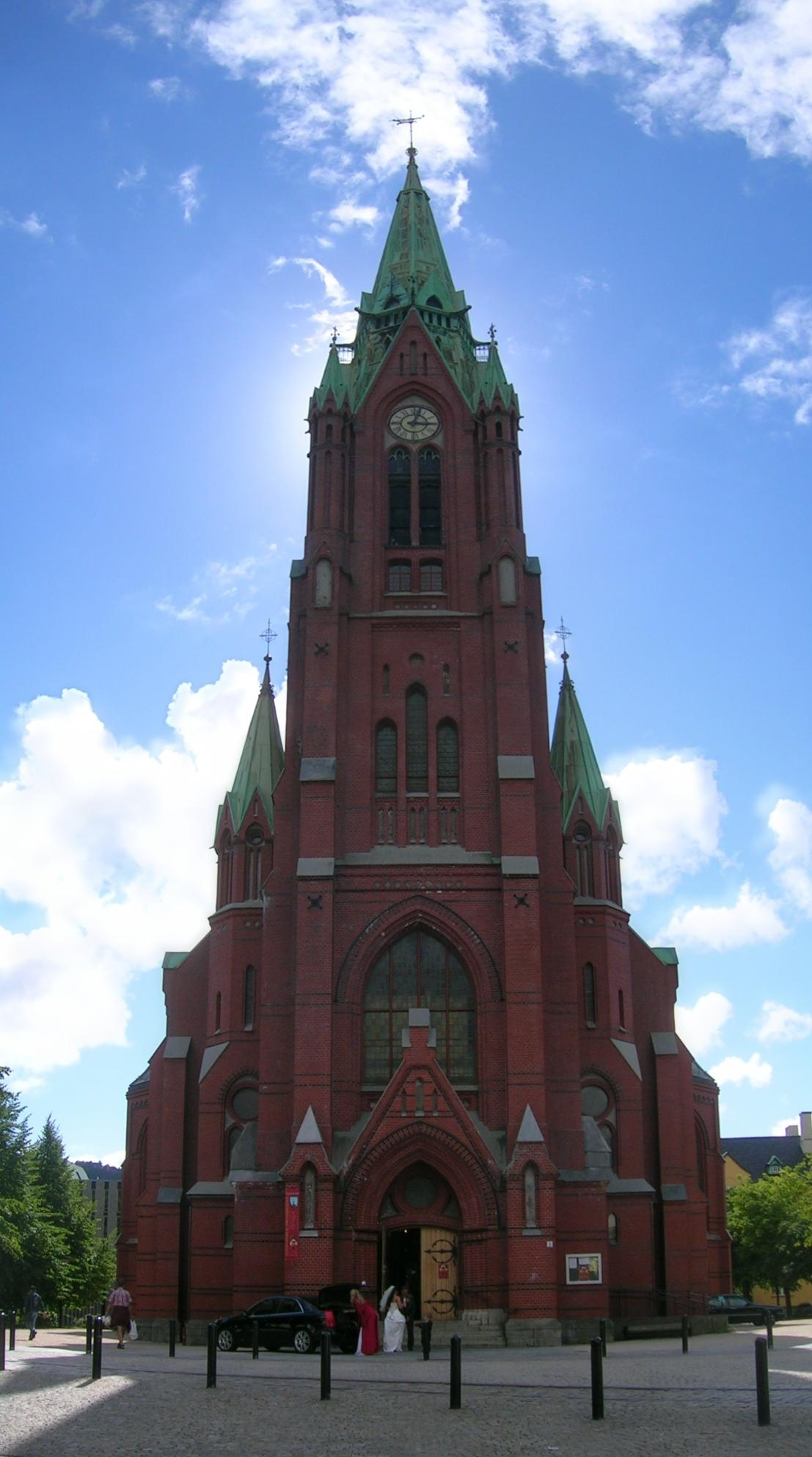
The St John's Church, Bergen is a Lutheran church in Norway.

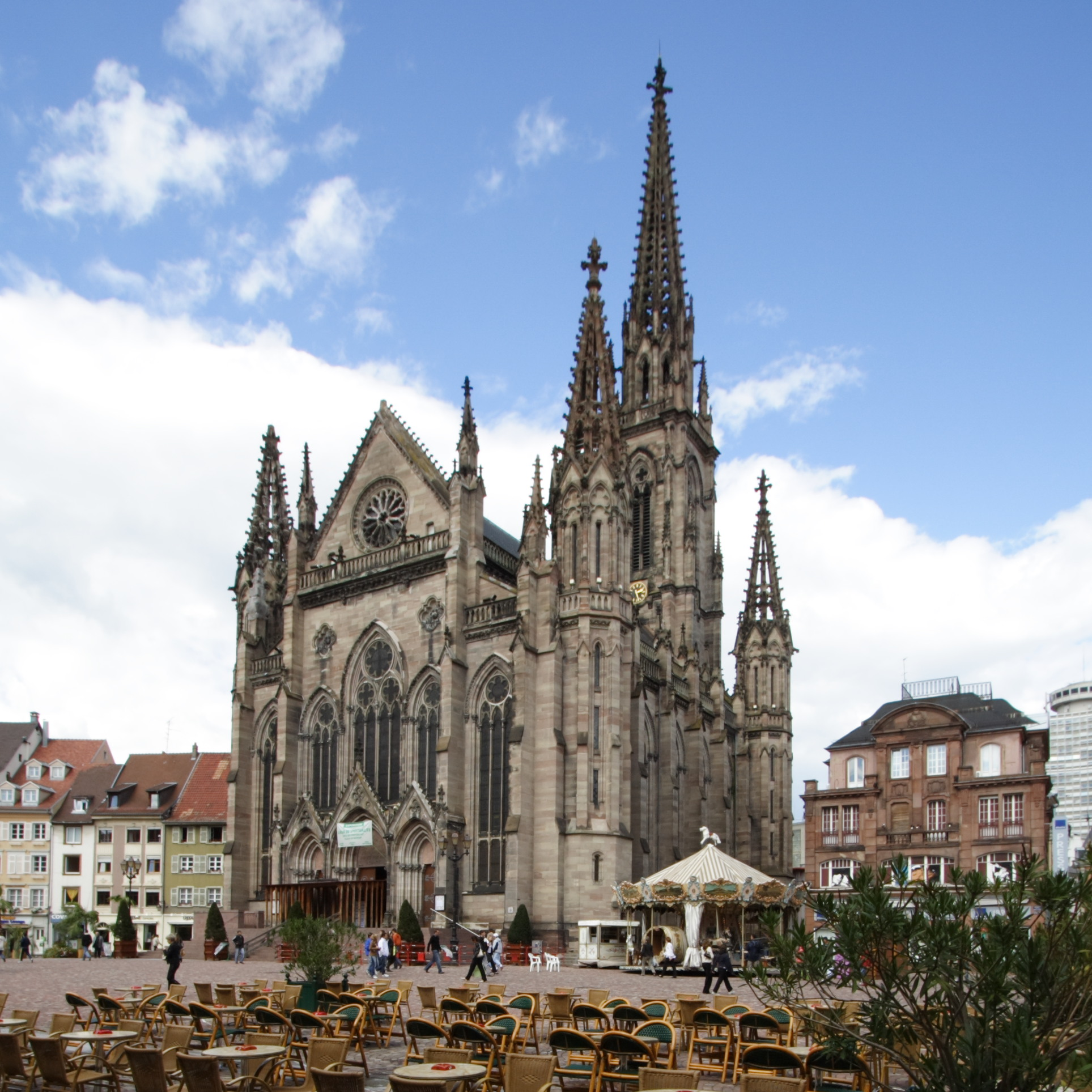
Calvinist Temple Saint-Étienne (Protestant St. Stephen's Church) in France

The majority of Europeans describe themselves as Christians, divided into a large number of denominations. Christian denominations are usually classed in three categories: Catholicism (consider only two groups, the Roman-Latin Catholic and the Eastern Greek and Armenian Catholics), Orthodoxy (consider only two groups, the Eastern Byzantine Orthodox and the Armenian Apostolic which is within the Oriental Orthodox Churches) and Protestantism (a diverse group including Lutheranism, Calvinism and Anglicanism as well as numerous minor denominations, including Baptists, Methodism, Evangelicalism, Pentecostalism, etc.).

Christianity, more specifically the Catholic Church, which played an important part in the shaping of Western civilization since at least the 4th century. Historically, Europe has been the center and "cradle of Christian civilization".

European culture, throughout most of its recent history, has been heavily influenced by Christian belief and has been nearly equivalent to Christian culture. The Christian culture was one of the more dominant forces to influence Western civilization, concerning the course of philosophy, art, music, science, social structure and architecture. The civilizing influence of Christianity includes social welfare, founding hospitals, economics (as the Protestant work ethic), politics, architecture, literature and family life.

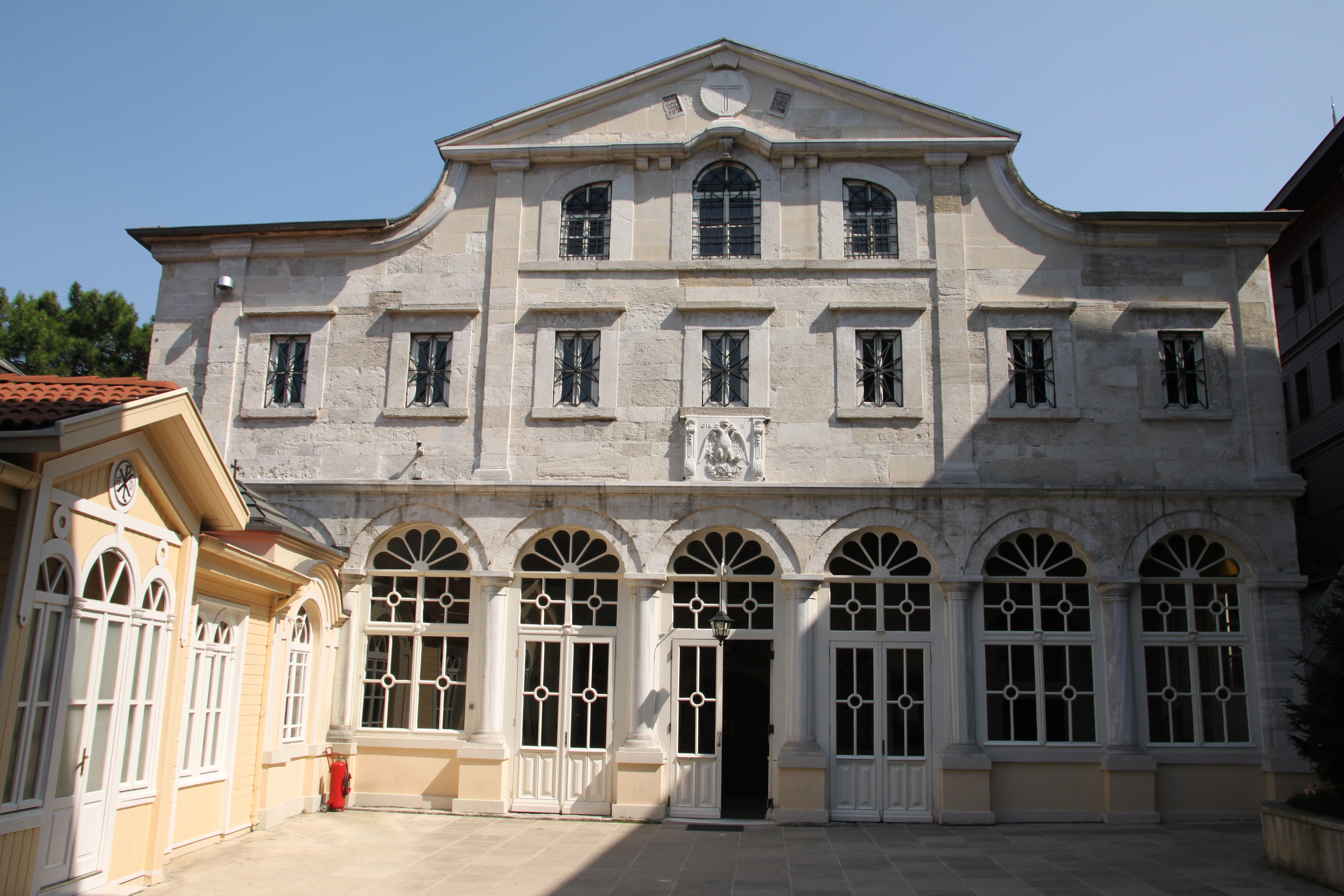
The Cathedral of St George, Constantinople (Modern-day Istanbul). It has been the Patriarchal seat since 1601, originally a late Byzantine chapel. It remains the central symbol of Eastern Orthodoxy and the authority of the Ecumenical Patriarch.

Christianity is still the largest religion in Europe. According to a survey about Religiosity in the European Union in 2019 by Eurobarometer, Christianity was the largest religion in the European Union accounting 64% of EU population, down from 72% in 2012. Catholics were the largest Christian group in EU, and accounted for 41% of the EU population, while Eastern Orthodox made up 10%, Protestants made up 9%, and other Christians 4%. According to a 2010 study by the Pew Research Center, 76.2% of the European population identified themselves as Christians, constitute in absolute terms the world's largest Christian population.

According to Scholars, in 2017, Europe's population was 77.8% Christian (up from 74.9% 1970), these changes were largely result of the collapse of Communism and switching to Christianity in the former Soviet Union and Eastern Bloc countries.

==== Christian denominations ====
- Catholicism (predominantly in the form of the Latin Church, with various minorities of the Byzantine Rite Eastern Catholic Churches in the Eastern European regions, and the Armenian Catholic Church in Armenia and its diaspora) is the largest denomination with adherents mostly existing in Latin Europe (which includes France, Italy, Spain, Portugal, Malta, San Marino, Monaco, Vatican City,); southern [Wallon] Belgium, Czech Republic, Ireland, Lithuania, Poland, Hungary, Slovakia, Slovenia, Croatia, western Ukraine, parts of Bosnia and Herzegovina (Mostly in predominantly Croat areas), but also the southern parts of Germanic Europe (which includes Austria, Luxembourg, northern Flemish Belgium, southern and western Germany, parts of the Netherlands, parts of Switzerland, and Liechtenstein).
- Eastern Orthodoxy (the churches are in full communion, i.e. the national churches are united in theological concept and part of the One, Holy, Catholic and Apostolic Eastern Orthodox Church) is strongest in eastern and south eastern Europe, reflecting the geography and cultural divisions of the Great Schism, and the Orthodox christianisation of Russia, which following suppression within the officially atheist context of the Soviet Union, reasserted itself post-communism.
  - Ecumenical Patriarchate of Constantinople
  - Russian Orthodox Church
  - Serbian Orthodox Church
  - Romanian Orthodox Church
  - Church of Greece
  - Bulgarian Orthodox Church
  - Georgian Orthodox Church
  - Finnish Orthodox Church
  - Cypriot Orthodox Church
  - Albanian Orthodox Church
  - Polish Orthodox Church
  - Church of the Czech Lands and Slovakia
  - Ukrainian Orthodox Church
  - Macedonian Orthodox Church – Ohrid Archbishopric
  - Montenegrin Orthodox Church
- Oriental Orthodoxy is strongest in eastern Europe and has communities in western Europe. There are an estimated 1.5 to 2.5 million Oriental Orthodox Christians (also known as Old Oriental or Non-Chalcedonian Christians) living in Europe today. This family of faith includes the Coptic, Armenian Apostolic, Syriac, Ethiopian, and Eritrean Tewahedo churches, which separated from the main body of Christianity following the Council of Chalcedon in 451 AD.
  - Armenian Apostolic Church & Armenian Patriarchate of Constantinople
  - Syriac Orthodox Church of Antioch
  - Coptic Orthodox Church
  - Ethiopian Orthodox Tewahedo Church
  - Eritrean Orthodox Tewahedo Church
  - Jacobite Syrian Christian Church
  - Malankara Orthodox Syrian Church
- Protestantism was most influential in central, north western and Northern Europe, with various branches becoming dominant in Great Britain (Anglicanism and Calvinism), northern Germany, the Netherlands and Scandinavia (Lutheranism). African and New World denominations also rose in those countries that had an effective empire in those areas.
  - Lutheranism
    - Independent Evangelical-Lutheran Church
    - Danish National Church
    - Estonian Evangelical Lutheran Church
    - Evangelical Lutheran Church of Finland
    - United Protestant Church of France
    - Protestant Church in Germany
    - Evangelical-Lutheran Church in Hungary
    - Evangelical Lutheran Church of Latvia
    - Church of Norway
    - Church of Sweden
  - Anglicanism
    - Church of England
    - Church of Ireland
    - Scottish Episcopal Church
    - Church in Wales
    - Lusitanian Catholic Apostolic Evangelical Church
    - Spanish Reformed Episcopal Church
  - Calvinism
    - United Reformed Church
    - Evangelical Presbyterian Church in England and Wales
    - Reformed Church in Hungary
    - Church of Scotland
    - Presbyterian Church in Ireland
    - Methodist Church of Great Britain
    - Protestant Church in the Netherlands (Neo-Calvinism)
    - United Protestant Church of France
    - Swiss Reformed Church
- Restorationism
  - The Church of Jesus Christ of Latter-day Saints
  - Jehovah's Witnesses
- Other
  - Baptist Union of Great Britain
  - Baptist Union of Sweden
  - Bruderhof Communities
  - Seventh-day Adventist Church

There are numerous minor Protestant movements, including various Evangelical congregations.

=== Islam ===
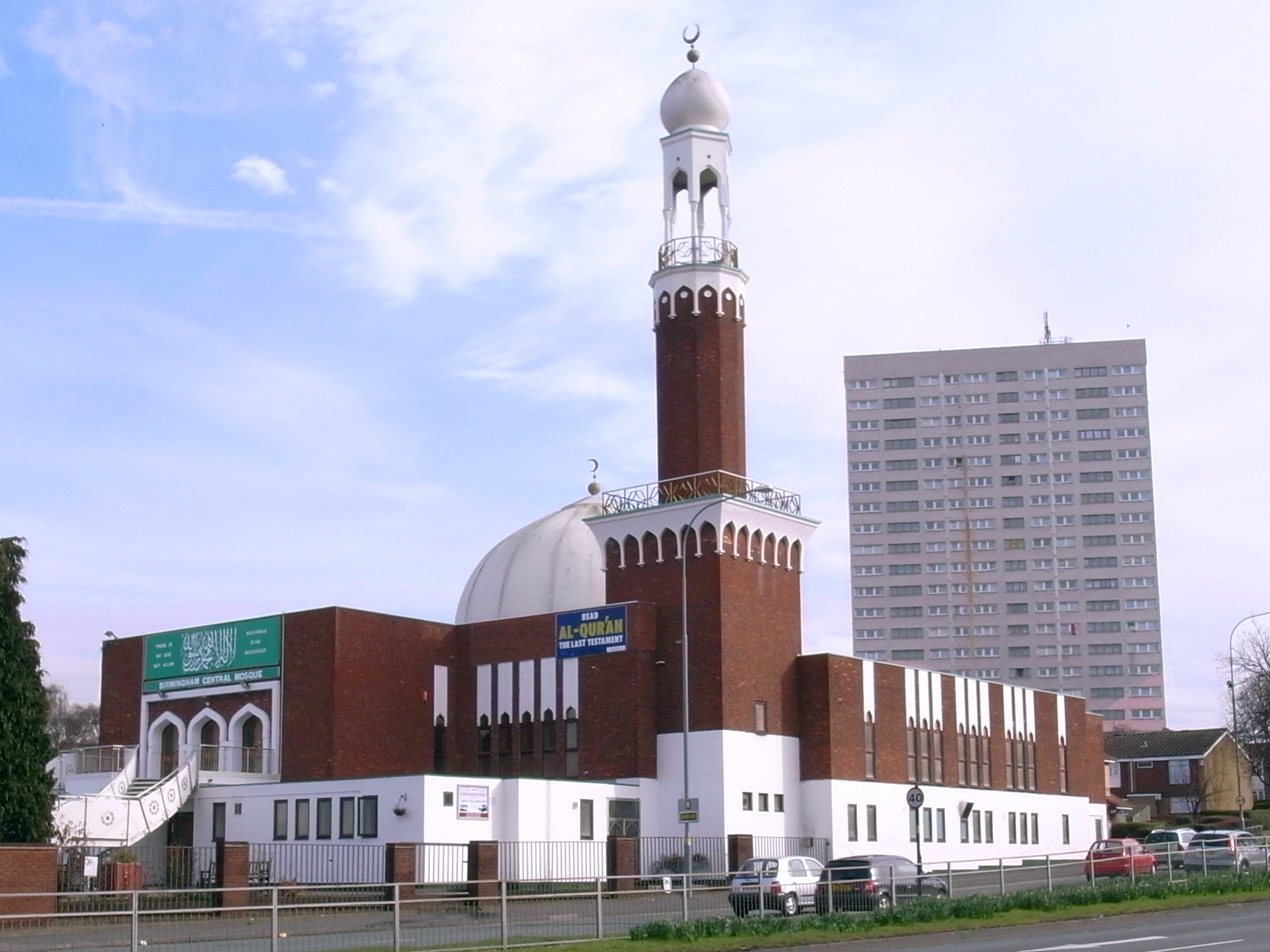
Birmingham Central Mosque, the first mosque in the United Kingdom to use loudspeakers to broadcast the adhan

Islam came to parts of European islands and coasts on the Mediterranean Sea during the 8th-century Muslim conquests. In the Iberian Peninsula and parts of southern France, various Muslim states existed before the Reconquista; Islam spread in southern Italy briefly through the Emirate of Sicily and Emirate of Bari. During the Ottoman expansion, Islam has spread into the Balkans and even parts of Central Europe. Muslims have also been historically present in Ukraine (Crimea and vicinity, with the Crimean Tatars), as well as modern-day Russia, beginning with Volga Bulgaria in the 10th century and the conversion of the Golden Horde to Islam. In recent years, Muslims have migrated to Europe as residents and temporary workers.

According to the Pew Forum, the total number of Muslims in Europe in 2010 was about 44 million (6%). While the total number of Muslims in the European Union in 2007 was about 16 million (3.2%). Data from the 2000s for the rates of growth of Islam in Europe showed that the growing number of Muslims was due primarily to immigration and higher birth rates.

Muslims make up 99% of the population in Turkey, Northern Cyprus, 96% in Kosovo, 51% in Bosnia and Herzegovina, 50.67% in Albania (including Bektashism), 32.17% in North Macedonia, 20% in Montenegro, between 10 and 15% in Russia, 7–9% in France, 8% in Bulgaria, 6% in the Netherlands, 5% in Denmark, United Kingdom and Germany, just over 4% in Switzerland and Austria, and between 3 and 4% in Greece.

A survey conducted by the Pew Research Center in 2016 found that Muslims make up 4.9% of all of Europe's population. According to a same study conversion does not add significantly to the growth of the Muslim population in Europe, with roughly 160,000 more people leaving Islam than converting into Islam between 2010 and 2016.

=== Judaism ===
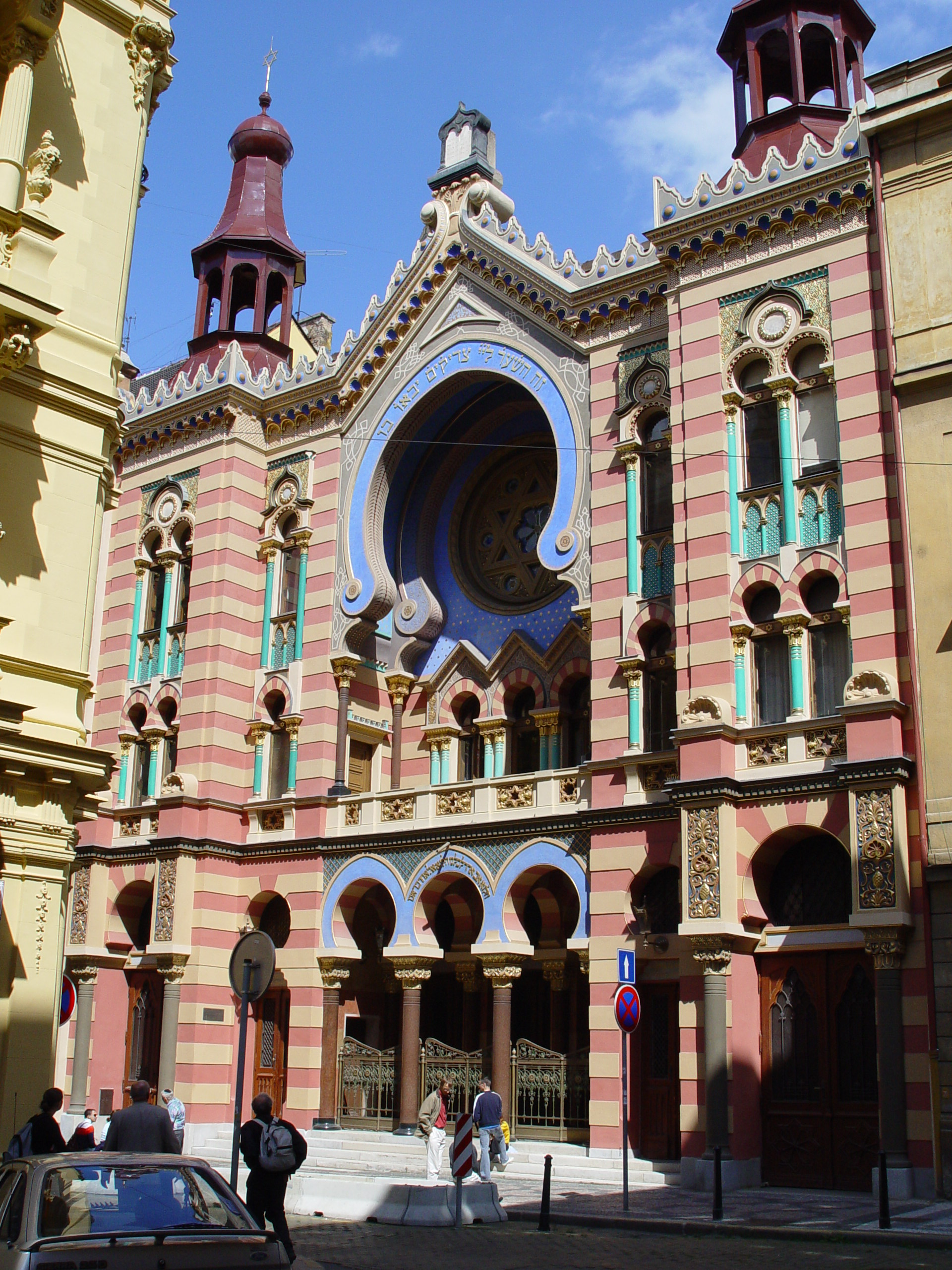
The Jubilee Synagogue in Prague, Czech Republic

The Jews were dispersed within the Roman Empire from the 2nd century. At one time Judaism was practiced widely throughout the European continent; throughout the Middle Ages, Jews were accused of ritual murder and faced pogroms and legal discrimination. The Holocaust perpetrated by Nazi Germany decimated the Jewish population, and today, France is home to the largest Jewish community in Europe with 1% of the total population (between 483,000 and 500,000 Jews). Other European countries with notable Jewish populations include the United Kingdom (291,000 Jews), Germany (119,000), and Russia (194,000) which is home to Eastern Europe's largest Jewish community. The Jewish population of Europe in 2010 was estimated to be approximately 1.4 million (0.2% of European population) or 10% of the world's Jewish population.

=== Bahá'í Faith ===
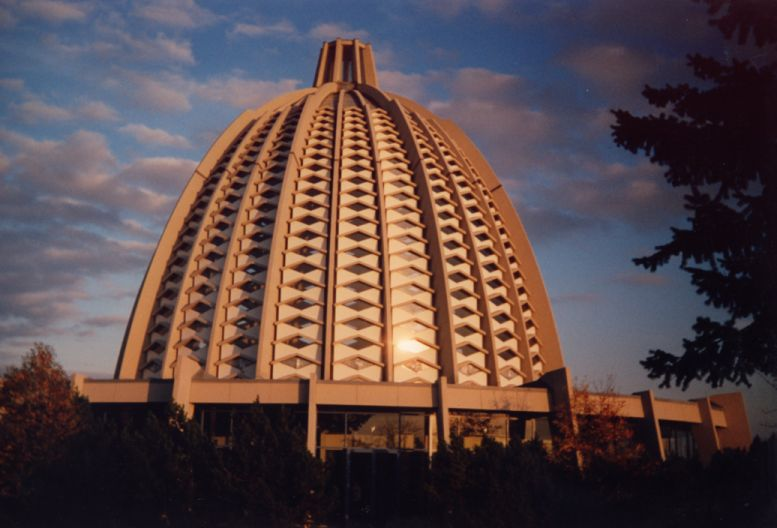
Bahá'í House of Worship, Langenhain, Germany

The first reference to the religious movement in a European newspaper began with coverage of the Báb, whom Bahá'ís consider the forerunner of the Bahá'í Faith, which occurred in The Times on 1 November 1845, only a little over a year after the Báb first started his mission. British, Russian, and other diplomats, businessmen, scholars, and world travelers also took note of the precursor Bábí religion most notably in 1865 by Frenchman Arthur de Gobineau who wrote the first and most influential account. In April 1890 Edward G. Browne of Cambridge University met Bahá'u'lláh, the prophet-founder of the Bahá'í Faith, and left the only detailed description by a Westerner.

Starting in the 1890s Europeans began to convert to the religion. In 1910 Bahá'u'lláh's son and appointed successor, 'Abdu'l-Bahá embarked on a three-year journey to including Europe and North America and then wrote a series of letters that were compiled together in the book titled Tablets of the Divine Plan which included mention of the need to spread the religion in Europe following the war.

A 1925 list of "leading local Bahá'í Centres" of Europe listed organized communities of many countries – the largest being in Germany. However the religion was soon banned in a couple of countries: in 1937 Heinrich Himmler disbanded the Bahá'í Faith's institutions in Germany because of its 'international and pacifist tendencies' and in Russia in 1938 "monstrous accusations" against Bahá'ís and a Soviet government policy of oppression of religion resulted in Bahá'í communities in 38 cities across Soviet territories ceasing to exist. However the religion recovered in both countries. The religion has generally spread such that in recent years the Association of Religion Data Archives estimated the Bahá'ís in European countries to number in hundreds to tens of thousands.

== Deism ==
During the Enlightenment, Deism became influential especially in France, Germany, the Netherlands, and the United Kingdom. Interpretations of the Bible then common were challenged by concepts such as a heliocentric universe and other scientific concepts posited to be challenges to the Bible. Notable early deists include Voltaire, Kant, and Mendeleev.

== Irreligion ==
The trend towards secularism during the 20th and 21st centuries has a number of reasons, depending on the individual country:

- France has been traditionally laicist since the French Revolution. Today the country is 25% to 32% irreligious. The remaining population is made up evenly of both Christians and people who believe in a god or some form of spiritual life force, but are not involved in organized religion. French society is still secular overall.
- Some parts of Eastern Europe were secularized as a matter of state doctrine under communist rule in the countries of the former Eastern Bloc. Albania was an officially (and constitutionally binding) atheist state from 1967 to 1991. The countries where the most people reported no religious belief were France (33%), the Czech Republic (30%), Belgium (27%), Netherlands (27%), Estonia (26%), Germany (25%), Sweden (23%) and Luxembourg (22%). The region of Eastern Germany, which was also under communist rule, is by far the least religious region in Europe. Other post-communist countries, however, have seen the opposite effect, with religion being very important in countries such as Romania, Lithuania and Poland.

The trend towards secularism has been less pronounced in the traditionally Catholic countries of Mediterranean Europe. Greece, traditionally known for the strong presence of the Greek Orthodox Church, has seen a gradual increase in the proportion of people identifying as atheist, agnostic, or non-religious. While findings since 1981 indicated strong religious sentiment, with around 80% of Greeks believing in God, a closer look reveals a partial retreat as Irreligion in Greece grows: in 2024, 27% of Greeks reported being indifferent to religion, up from 18% in 2018. According to a nationwide survey by Metron Analysis for To Vima in December 2024, 66% of Greeks declared that they have a religion, but only 15% reported attending church regularly. Estimates from other sources suggest that roughly 4–15% of the population explicitly identify as atheist.

According to a Pew Research Center Survey in 2012 the religiously unaffiliated (atheists and agnostics) make up about 18.2% of the European population in 2010. According to the same survey the religiously unaffiliated make up the majority of the population in only two European countries: Czech Republic (76%) and Estonia (60%). A newer study (released in 2015) found that in the Netherlands there is also an irreligious majority of 68%.

=== Atheism and agnosticism ===
During the late 20th and early 21st centuries, atheism and agnosticism have increased, with falling church attendance and membership in various European countries. The 2010 Eurobarometer survey found that on total average, of the EU28 population, 51% "believe there is a God", 26% "believe there is some sort of spirit or life force", and 20% "don't believe there is any sort of spirit, God or life force". Across the EU, belief was higher among women, increased with age, those with a strict upbringing, those with the lowest level of formal education and those leaning towards right-wing politics. Results were varied widely between different countries.

According to a survey measuring religious identification in the European Union in 2019 by Eurobarometer, 10% of EU citizens identify themselves as atheists. As of May 2019, the top seven European countries with the most people who viewed themselves as atheists were Czech Republic (22%), France (21%), Sweden (16%), Estonia (15%), Slovenia (14%), Spain (12%) and Netherlands (11%). 17% of EU citizens called themselves non-believers or agnostics and this percentage was the highest in Netherlands (41%), Czech Republic (34%), Sweden (34%), United Kingdom (28%), Estonia (23%), Germany (21%) and Spain (20%).

== Dharmic religions ==
=== Buddhism ===
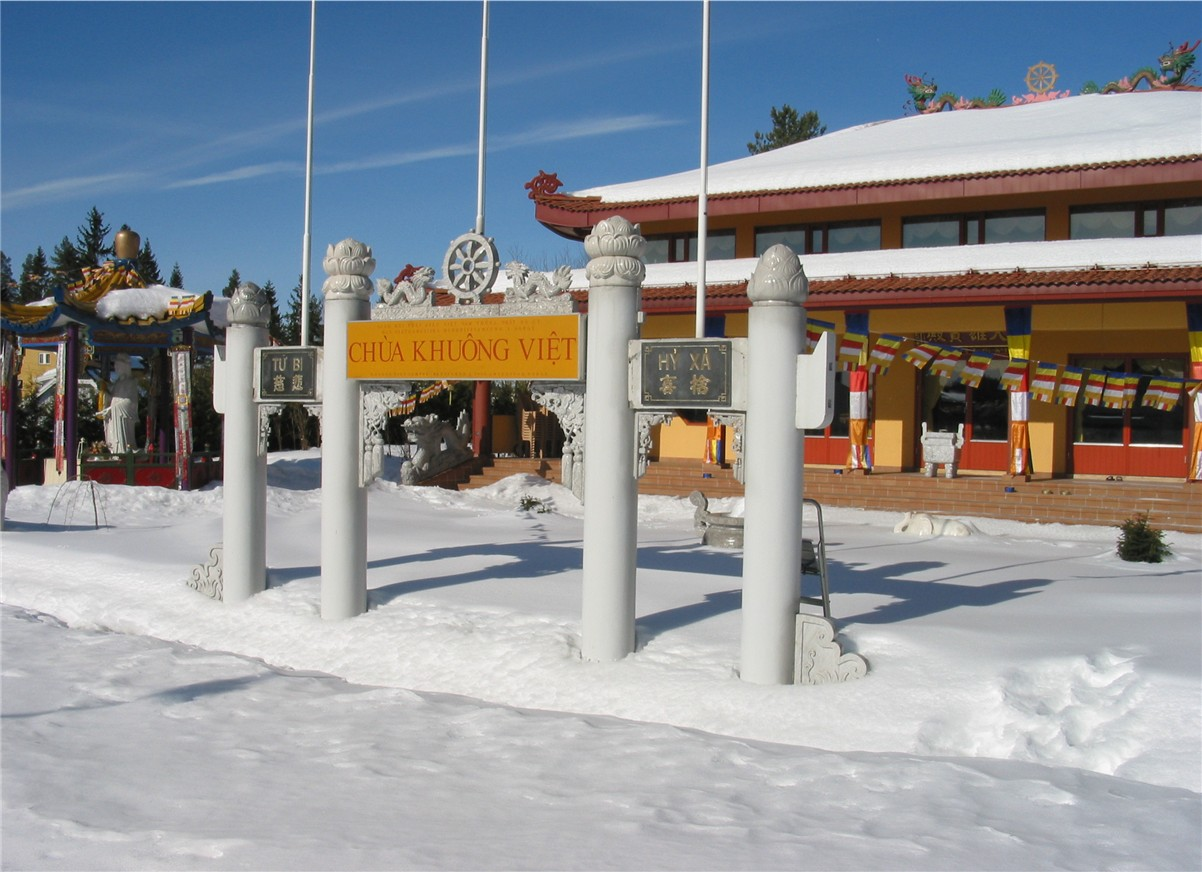
Vietnamese Buddhist temple in Norway

Buddhism is thinly spread throughout Europe, and the fastest growing religion in recent years with about 3 million adherents. Kalmykia is the only region in Europe where Buddhism is the predominant faith. Tibetan Buddhism is prevalent there.

=== Hinduism ===
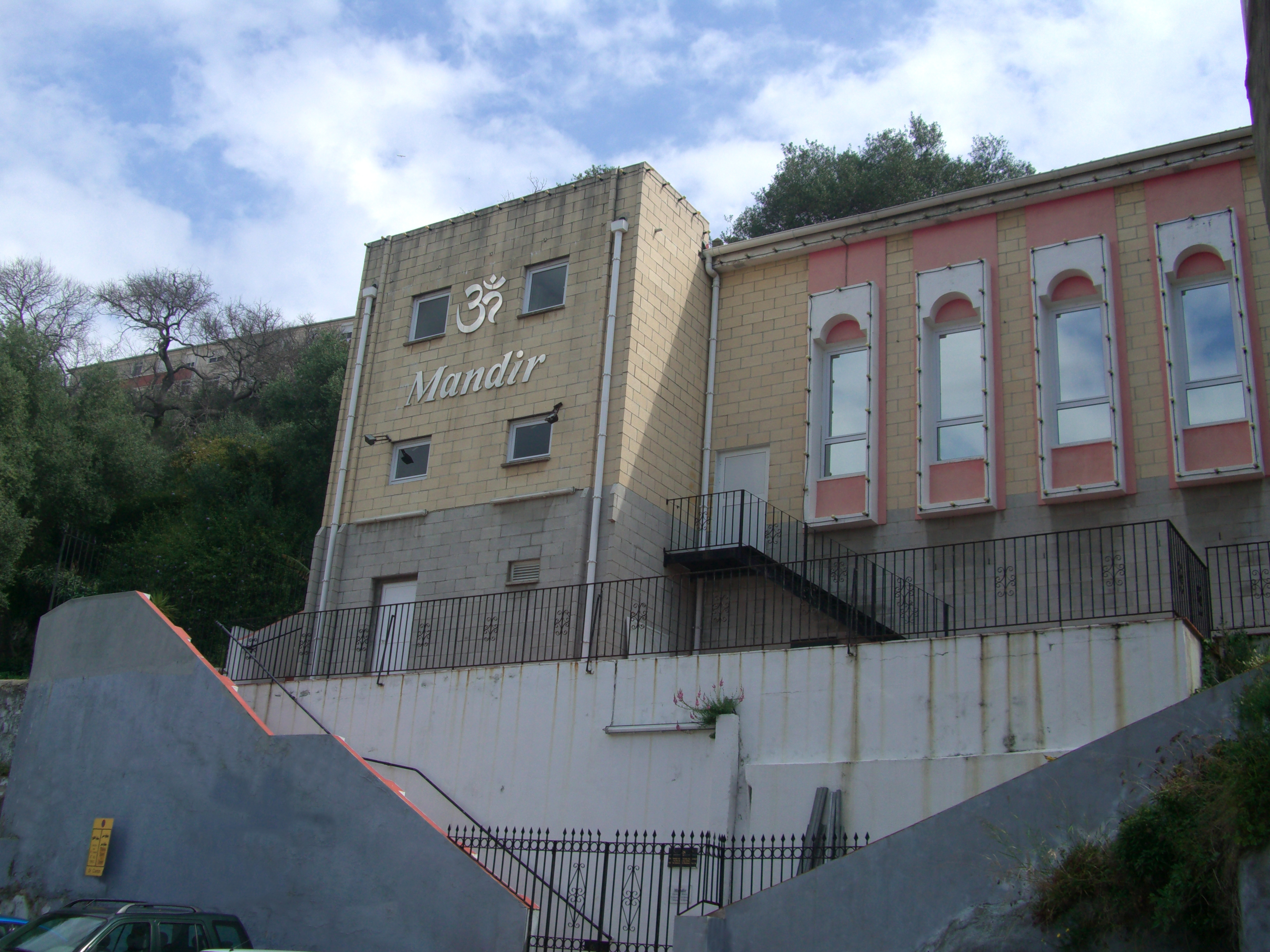
Mandir in Gibraltar

The Hindu communities in continental Europe are ethnically diverse and unevenly distributed across countries. In Portugal, particularly around Lisbon, many Hindus are Gujarati migrants from Mozambique who arrived after decolonization. In Spain, Sindhi Hindus are concentrated in the Canary Islands, while Punjabi migrants from India are more common around Barcelona, alongside smaller groups from Nepal and Bangladesh and some European converts. Italy hosts large Punjabi communities in its northern regions, as well as Bangladeshi Hindus. In France and Germany, a significant proportion of Hindus are Sri Lankan Tamils, many of whom arrived as refugees. Meanwhile, Netherlands is home to a major population of Surinamese Hindus, descendants of Indian indentured laborers, and Czech Republic stands out for having a notable number of native European Hindu converts. Balinese Hindus are present generally in Germany.

It has been growing rapidly in recent years, notably in the United Kingdom, France, the Netherlands and Italy. In 2020, there were an estimated 2.15 million Hindu adherents in Europe.

=== Jainism ===
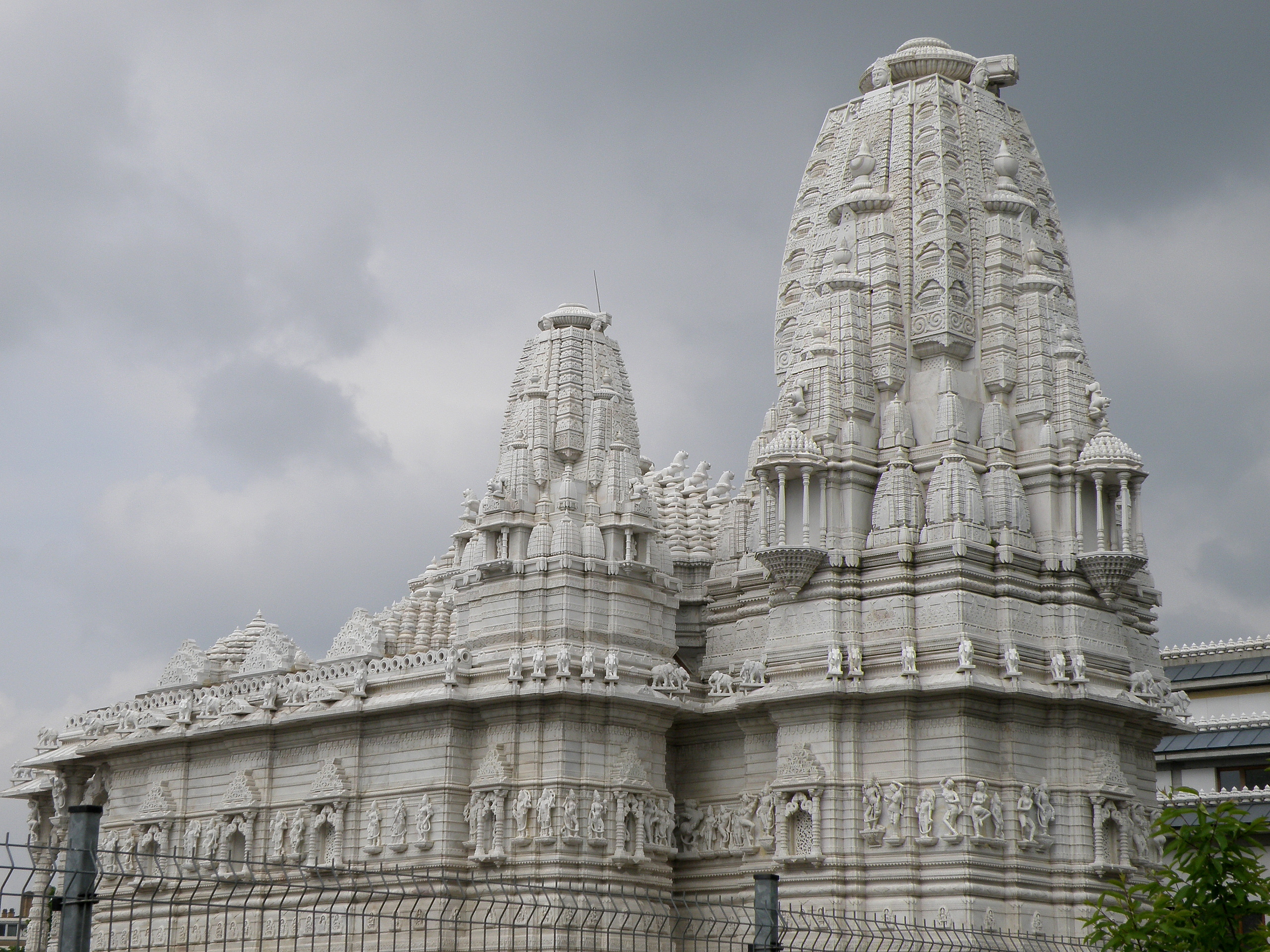
Jain temple in Antwerp, Belgium

Jainism, small membership rolls, mainly among Indian immigrants in Belgium and the United Kingdom, as well as several converts from western and northern Europe.

=== Sikhism ===
Sikhism has nearly 700,000 adherents in Europe. Most of the community live in United Kingdom (450,000) and Italy (100,000). Around 10,000 Sikhs live in Belgium and France. Netherlands and Germany have a Sikh population of 22,000. All other countries, such as Greece, have 5,000 or fewer Sikhs.

== Modern paganism ==
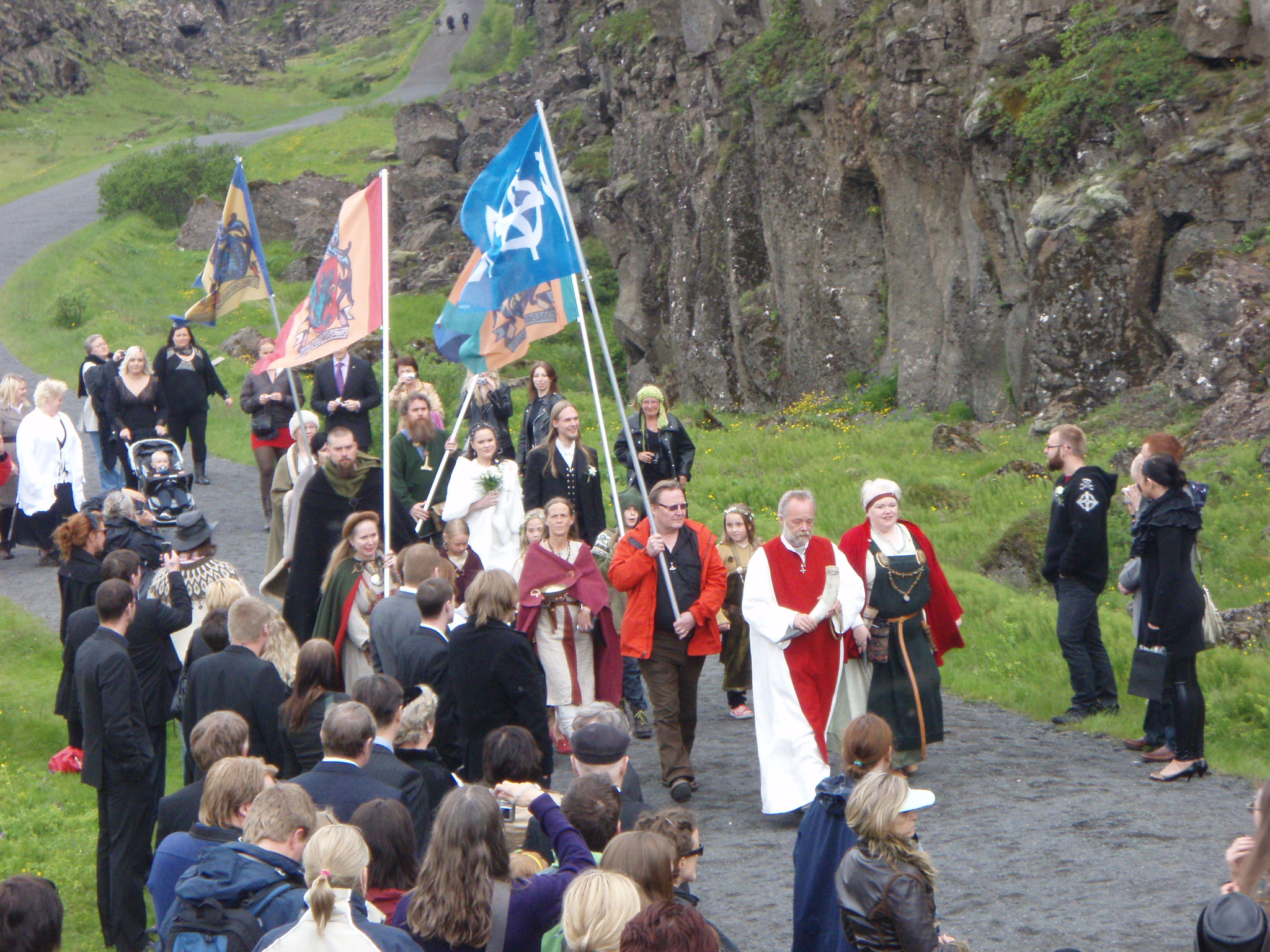
Esetrother community of the Íslenska Ásatrúarfélagið (Icelandic Esetroth Fellowship) preparing for a Þingblót at Þingvellir

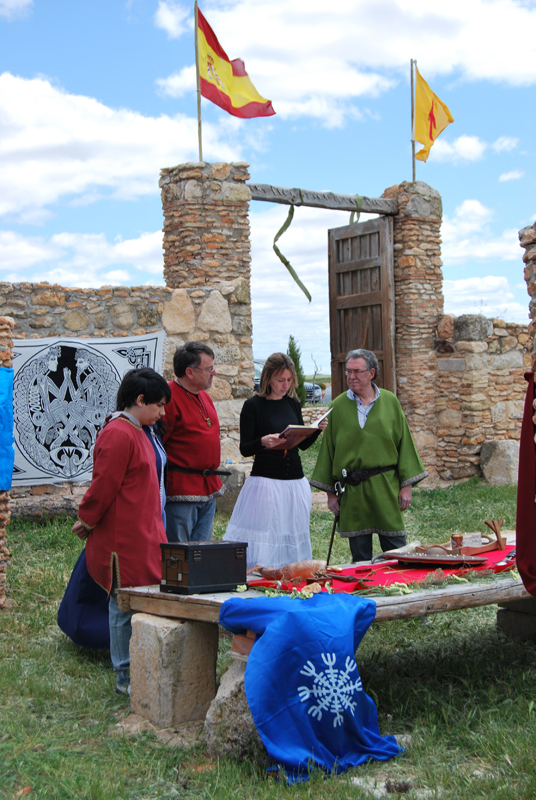
An Odinist-rite wedding in Spain, in 2010, at the Temple of Gaut in Albacete

=== Germanic ===
Heathenism or Esetroth (Icelandic: Ásatrú), and the organised form Odinism, are names for the modern folk religion of the Germanic nations.

In the United Kingdom Census 2001, 300 people registered as Heathen in England and Wales. However, many Heathens followed the advice of the Pagan Federation (PF) and simply described themselves as "Pagan", while other Heathens did not specify their religious beliefs. In the 2011 census, 1,958 people self-identified as Heathen in England and Wales. A further 251 described themselves as Reconstructionist and may include some people reconstructing Germanic paganism.

Ásatrúarfélagið (Esetroth Fellowship) was recognized as an official religion by the Icelandic government in 1973. For its first 20 years it was led by farmer and poet Sveinbjörn Beinteinsson. By 2003, it had 777 members, and by 2014, it had 2,382 members, corresponding to 0.8% of Iceland's population. In Iceland, Germanic religion has an impact larger than the number of its adherents.

In Sweden, the Swedish Forn Sed Assembly (Forn Sed, or the archaic Forn Siðr, means "Old Custom") was formed in 1994 and is since 2007 recognized as a religious organization by the Swedish government. In Denmark Forn Siðr was formed in 1999, and was officially recognized in 2003 The Norwegian Åsatrufellesskapet Bifrost (Esetroth Fellowship Bifrost) was formed in 1996; as of 2011, the fellowship has some 300 members. Foreningen Forn Sed was formed in 1999, and has been recognized by the Norwegian government as a religious organization. In Spain there is the Odinist Community of Spain – Ásatrú.

=== Roman ===
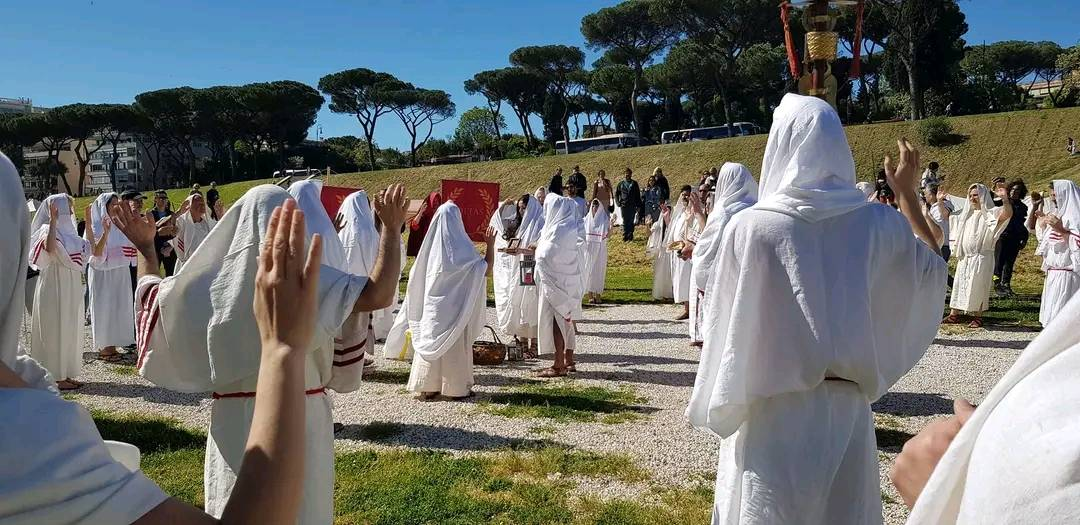
Pietas Comunità Gentile officiates the rite for the celebration of the 2777th Natale di Roma at the Circus Maximus.

The Roman polytheism also known as Religio Romana (Roman religion) in Latin or the Roman Way to the Gods (in Italian 'Via romana agli Déi') is alive in small communities as well as in larger organizations, mainly in Italy. Among these organisations, Pietas Comunità Gentile is regarded as a major group due to its contributions to the religion, including the performance of public rites, the reconstruction of temples, and engagement with public institutions and government bodies in efforts to obtain formal recognition.

The Natale di Roma, historically known as Dies Romana and also referred to as Romaia, is a festival linked to the foundation of Rome, celebrated on April 21. According to legend, Romulus is said to have founded the city of Rome on April 21, 753 BC. From this date, the Roman chronology derived its system, known by the Latin phrase Ab Urbe condita, meaning "from the founding of the City", which counted the years from this presumed foundation.

=== Druidry ===
The religious development of Druidry was largely influenced by Iolo Morganwg. Modern practises aim to imitate the practises of the Celtic peoples of the Iron Age.

=== Slavic ===
Slavic Native Faith, commonly known as Rodnovery (Note: The term is derived from the Proto-Slavic roots *rod (род), which means anything which is "indigenous", "ancestral" and "native", also "genus", "generation", "kin", "race" (e.g. Russian родная rodnaya or родной rodnoy), and is also the name of the universe's supreme god according to Slavic knowledge; and *vera, which means "faith", "religion". The term has many emic variations, all of which are compounds, in different Slavic languages, including: Belarusian: Раднавер'е, romanized: Radnavierje; Bulgarian: Родноверие, romanized: Rodnoverie; Bosnian: Rodnovjerje; Macedonian: Родноверие, romanized: Rodnoverie; Czech: Rodnověří; Croatian: Rodnovjerje; Polish: Rodzimowierstwo; Rodzima Wiara; Russian: Родноверие, romanized: Rodnovjerije; Slovak: Rodnoverie; Slovene: Rodnoverstvo; Serbian: Родноверје, romanized: Rodnoverje; Ukrainian: Рідновірство; Рідновір'я, romanized: Ridnovirstvo; Ridnovirja; From some variations of the term, the English adaptations "Rodnovery" and its adjective "Rodnover(s)" have taken foothold in English-language literature, supported and used by Rodnovers themselves.) and sometimes as Slavic Neopaganism, (Note: The locution "Slavic Neopaganism" has been used within the academic study of the movement but it is never used by adherents themselves, who reject it for the connotations of both "new" and "pagan".) emerged in 19th century but is based on much older religion from medieval era. Main countries with Slavic Neopagans are Russia (10,000–757,000 Slavic Neopagans in 2012), Ukraine (5,000–10,000 Slavic Neopagans) and Poland (7,000–10,000 Slavic Neopagans).

== Other religions ==
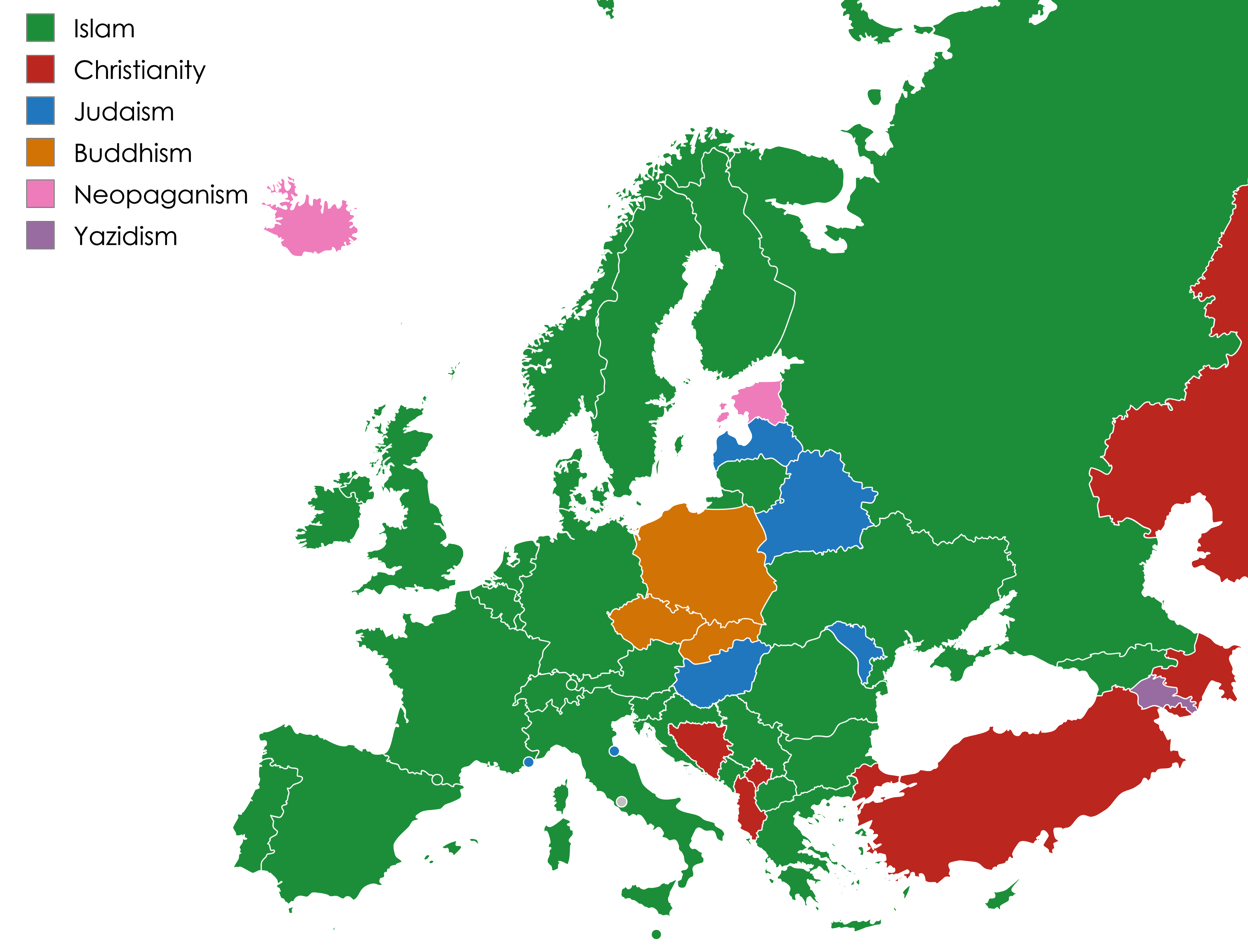
Second largest religion in European countries

Other religions represented in Europe include:

- Animism
- Confucianism
- Eckankar
- Ietsism
- Raëlism
- Beliefs of the Romani people
- Romuva
- Reconstructionist Roman religion
- Shinto
- Spiritualism
- Taoism
- Thelema
- Unitarian Universalism
- Yazidism
- Zoroastrianism
- Rastafari communities in the United Kingdom, France, Spain, Portugal, Italy and elsewhere.
- Traditional African Religions (including Muti), mainly in the United Kingdom and France, including
- West African Vodun and Haitian Vodou (Voodoo), mainly among West African and black Caribbean immigrants in the United Kingdom and France.

== Religious distribution ==
=== Central Europe ===
Country	Population	Christian		Muslim		Irreligion		Hindu		Buddhist		Jewish		Other religion		Not stated/Undeclared	
Country	Population	Pop.	%	Pop.	%	Pop.	%	Pop.	%	Pop.	%	Pop.	%	Pop.	%	Pop.	%
Austria	8,935,800	6,093,700	68.2	745,600	8.3	1,997,700	22.40	10,100	0.00	26,600	0.20	5,400	0.00	62,100	0.1	—N/a	—N/a
Czech Republic	10,524,167	1,241,214	11.7	5,244	0.05	5,027,094	47.8	2,024	0.02	5,757	0.05	1,474	0.02	1,123,283	10.7	3,162,540	30.1
Germany	82,300,000	56,540,100	68.70	4,773,400	5.80	20,328,100	24.70	—N/a	—N/a	246,900	0.30	246,990	0.30	82,300	0.10	—N/a	—N/a
Hungary	9,603,630	4,086,250	42.5	7,983	0.1	1,549,610	16.1	3,307	0.03	11,042	0.1	7,635	0.1	85,646	0.9	3,852,533	40.1
Liechtenstein	40,000	36,760	91.90	2,000	5.00	1,160	2.90	—N/a	—N/a	—N/a	—N/a	—N/a	—N/a	—N/a	—N/a	40	0.10
Poland	38,036,120	27,550,861	72.43	2,209	0.01	2,611,506	6.87	—N/a	—N/a	3,236	0.01	—N/a	—N/a	44,694	0.12	7,823,612	20.57
Slovakia	5,449,270	3,747,558	68.8	3,862	0.1	1,296,142	23.8	975	0.02	6,722	0.1	2,007	0.04	38,157	0.7	353,797	6.5
Total	163,169,237	118,062,752	72.36	5,951,406	3.47	33,471,696	20.51	43,739	0.03	316,619	0.19	255,871	0.16	1,313,500	0.80	3,549,337	2.18

==== Eastern Europe ====
Country	Population	Christian		Muslim		Irreligion		Hindu		Buddhist		Folk religion		Other religion		Jewish	
Country	Population	Pop.	%	Pop.	%	Pop.	%	Pop.	%	Pop.	%	Pop.	%	Pop.	%	Pop.	%
Belarus	9,611,750	6,835,200	71.20	19,200	0.20	2,745,600	28.60	—N/a	—N/a	—N/a	—N/a	—N/a	—N/a	—N/a	—N/a	—N/a	—N/a
(Georgia (country)) Georgia	4,350,225	3,849,750	88.50	465,450	10.70	30,450	0.70	—N/a	—N/a	—N/a	—N/a	—N/a	—N/a	—N/a	—N/a	—N/a	—N/a
Russia	142,960,000	104,789,680	73.30	14,296,000	10.00	23,159,520	16.20	—N/a	—N/a	142,960	0.10	285,920	0.20	—N/a	—N/a	285,920	0.20
Ukraine	45,450,000	38,087,100	83.80	545,400	1.20	6,681,150	14.70	—N/a	—N/a	—N/a	—N/a	—N/a	—N/a	—N/a	—N/a	45,450	0.10
Total	202,360,000	153,561,730	75.89%	15,326,050	7.57%	32,616,720	16.12%	40,000	0.02%	162,960	0.08%	290,420	0.14%	0	0.00%	331,370	0.16%

==== Northern Europe ====
Country	Population	Christian		Muslim		Irreligion		Jewish		Buddhist		Pagan		Other religion		/Undecided/Not Stated	
Country	Population	Pop.	%	Pop.	%	Pop.	%	Pop.	%	Pop.	%	Pop.	%	Pop.	%	Pop.	%
Denmark	5,822,863	4,413,430	75.8	256,206	4.4	1,112,167	19.1	—N/a	—N/a	—N/a	—N/a	—N/a	—N/a	40,760	0.7	—N/a	—N/a
Faroe Islands	50,000	49,000	98.00	—N/a	—N/a	850	1.70	—N/a	—N/a	—N/a	—N/a	—N/a	—N/a	150	0.30	—N/a	—N/a
Estonia^{*}	1,331,824	298,410	26.8	5,800	0.5	650,900	58.4	—N/a	—N/a	1,880	0.2	5,630	0.5	9,630	0.9	141,780	12.7
Finland	5,548,000	3,805,928	68.6	—N/a	—N/a	1,697,688	30.6	—N/a	—N/a	—N/a	—N/a	—N/a	—N/a	44,384	0.8	—N/a	—N/a
Iceland	364,134	274,321	75.06	1,281	0.35	29,621	8.13	—N/a	—N/a	1,495	0.42	4,764	1.31	53,652	14.73	—N/a	—N/a
Latvia	1,893,223	1,249,527	66.0	2,500	0.10	539,035	29.0	—N/a	—N/a	—N/a	—N/a	—N/a	—N/a	4,500	0.20	—N/a	—N/a
Lithuania	3,320,000	2,230,020	79.37	2,165	0.08	171,810	6.11	1,154	0.04	—N/a	—N/a	—N/a	—N/a	16,486	0.58	384,094	13.67
Norway	5,367,580	4,059,366	75.63	182,826	3.41	1,083,076	20.17	794	0.01	21,555	0.40	—N/a	—N/a	19,963	5.21	—N/a	—N/a
Sweden	10,379,295	6,364,093	61.3	246,498	2.3	3,739,255	36.0	8,148	0.08	12,328	0.1	—N/a	—N/a	10,380	0.10	—N/a	—N/a
Total	32,450,000	24,569,250	75.71%	893,290	2.75%	6,751,930	20.81%	66,320	0.20%	79,180	0.24%	20,370	0.06%	33,810	0.10%	9,380	0.03%
^{*} Only includes the population of religious affiliation for 15 years old or above.

==== Southeastern Europe (Balkans) ====
Country	Population	Christian		Muslim		Irreligion		Hindu		Buddhist		Jewish		Other religion		Not stated/Undeclared	
Country	Population	Pop.	%	Pop.	%	Pop.	%	Pop.	%	Pop.	%	Pop.	%	Pop.	%	Pop.	%
Albania	2,402,113	384,833	16	1,217,362	50.67	417,466	17.37	—N/a	—N/a	—N/a	—N/a	—N/a	—N/a	—N/a	—N/a	382,452	15.91
Bosnia and Herzegovina	3,824,782	1,755,574	45.9	1,939,164	50.70	94,000	2.50	—N/a	—N/a	—N/a	—N/a	—N/a	—N/a	—N/a	—N/a	—N/a	—N/a
Bulgaria	6,519,789	4,219,270	64.7	638,708	9.8	1,036,943	15.9	—N/a	—N/a	—N/a	—N/a	1,736	0.03	6,451	0.1	616,681	9.5
Croatia	3,871,833	3,383,980	87.46	51,110	1.32	247,410	6.39	—N/a	—N/a	—N/a	—N/a	—N/a	—N/a	72,400	1.87	149,450	3.86
Greece	11,360,000	10,008,160	88.10	602,080	5.30	692,960	6.10	11,360	0.10	—N/a	—N/a	—N/a	—N/a	—N/a	—N/a	—N/a	—N/a
Kosovo	1,585,566	64,498	4.06	1,482,276	93.50	7,899	0.50	—N/a	—N/a	—N/a	—N/a	—N/a	—N/a	7,175	0.45	23,718	1.50
Moldova	3,570,000	3,477,180	97.40	21,420	0.60	49,980	1.40	—N/a	—N/a	—N/a	—N/a	21,420	0.60	—N/a	—N/a	—N/a	—N/a
Montenegro	623,633	464,370	74.46	124,668	19.99	16,784	2.69	—N/a	—N/a	—N/a	—N/a	—N/a	—N/a	22,859	2.86	—N/a	—N/a
North Macedonia	1,836,713	1,109,808	60.43	590,879	32.17	10,728	0.59	—N/a	—N/a	894	0.05	74	<0.01	209	0.02	132,260	7.20
Romania	19,053,815	16,161,328	84.82	58,335	0.31	128,622	—N/a	—N/a	—N/a	—N/a	—N/a	2,707	0.01	23,925	0.12	2,656,477	13.04
Serbia	6,647,003	5,758,719	86.68	278,212	4.19	82,793	1.25	—N/a	—N/a	—N/a	—N/a	602	0.01	1,707	0.03	524,970	7.9
Slovenia	2,030,000	1,591,520	78.40	73,080	3.60	365,400	18.00	—N/a	—N/a	—N/a	—N/a	—N/a	—N/a	—N/a	—N/a	—N/a	—N/a
Total	63,325,247	48,379,240	76.40	7,077,294	11.18	3,150,985	4.98	11,360	0.02%	894	<0.01	26,539	0.04	134,726	0.21	4,486,008	7.08

==== Southern Europe ====
Country	Population	Christian		Muslim		Irreligion		Hindu		Buddhist		Folk religion		Other religion		Jewish	
Country	Population	Pop.	%	Pop.	%	Pop.	%	Pop.	%	Pop.	%	Pop.	%	Pop.	%	Pop.	%
Andorra	80,740	71,600	89.50	640	0.80	7,040	8.80	400	0.50	—N/a	—N/a	—N/a	—N/a	80	0.10	240	0.30
Gibraltar	30,000	26,640	88.80	1,200	4.00	870	2.90	540	1.80	—N/a	—N/a	—N/a	—N/a	90	0.30	630	2.10
Italy	60,550,000	50,438,150	83.30	2,240,350	3.70	7,508,200	12.40	60,550	0.10	121,100	0.20	60,550	0.10	60,000	0.10	50,000	0.08
Malta	420,264	407,400	97.00	840	0.20	10,500	2.50	840	0.20	—N/a	—N/a	—N/a	—N/a	—N/a	—N/a	—N/a	—N/a
Portugal	10,343,066	7,444,786	84.77	36,480	0.42	1,237,130	14.09	19,471	0.22	16,757	0.19	—N/a	—N/a	24,366	0.28	2,910	0.03
San Marino	30,000	27,480	91.60	—N/a	—N/a	2,160	7.20	—N/a	—N/a	—N/a	—N/a	—N/a	—N/a	270	0.90	90	0.30
Spain	46,080,000	23,961,600	52.0	967,680	2.10	20,321,280	44.1	20,000	0.04	—N/a	—N/a	20,000	0.04	10,000	0.02	46,080	0.10
Vatican City	800	800	100.00	—N/a	—N/a	—N/a	—N/a	—N/a	—N/a	—N/a	—N/a	—N/a	—N/a	—N/a	—N/a	—N/a	—N/a
Total	106,870,800	87,208,790	82.47%	2,674,790	2.78%	16,053,890	14.21%	93,010	0.08%	185,180	0.16%	133,950	0.11%	70,440	0.06%	97,040	0.08%

==== Western Europe ====
Country	Population	Christian		Irreligion		Muslim		Hindu		Buddhist		Paganism/Neo-Paganism		Other religion		Jewish		Sikh		Not stated/Undeclared	
Country	Population	Pop.	%	Pop.	%	Pop.	%	Pop.	%	Pop.	%	Pop.	%	Pop.	%	Pop.	%	Pop.	%	Pop.	%
Belgium	11,521,238	5,645,406	49.0	4,723,708	41.0	691,274	6.0	—N/a	—N/a	115,212	1.0	—N/a	—N/a	345,637	3.0	—N/a	—N/a	—N/a	—N/a	—N/a	—N/a
England	56,490,048	26,167,899	46.3	20,715,664	36.7	3,801,186	6.7	1,020,533	1.8	262,433	0.5	95,931	0.2	78,851	0.1	269,283	0.5	520,092	0.9	3,400,548	6.0
France	65,250,000	32,625,000	50.0	21,532,000	33.0	2,610,000	4.0	—N/a	—N/a	1,305,000	2.0	—N/a	—N/a	653,000	1.0	652,500	1.0	—N/a	—N/a	5,873,000	9.0
(Republic of Ireland) Ireland	5,145,255	3,885,560	75.50	758,734	14.8	83,272	1.60	33,827	0.70	9,285	0.20	3,868	0.10	22,163	0.40	2,193	0.04	2,183	0.04	345,165	6.70
Isle of Man	84,069	40,735	48.5	32,603	38.8	393	0.5	263	0.3	390	0.5	0	0.0	0	0.0	113	0.1	—N/a	—N/a	9,582	11.4
Luxembourg	510,000	359,040	70.40	136,580	26.8	11,730	2.3	—N/a	—N/a	—N/a	—N/a	—N/a	—N/a	1,530	0.30	510	0.10	—N/a	—N/a	—N/a	—N/a
Monaco	40,000	34,400	86.00	4,680	11.7	160	0.4	—N/a	—N/a	—N/a	—N/a	—N/a	—N/a	80	0.20	680	1.70	—N/a	—N/a	—N/a	—N/a
Netherlands	17,424,978	6,238,140	35.8	10,019,362	57.5	801,550	4.6	—N/a	—N/a	—N/a	—N/a	—N/a	—N/a	365,925	2.1	—N/a	—N/a	—N/a	—N/a	—N/a	—N/a
Northern Ireland	1,903,188	1,516,152	79.7	330,983	17.4	10,870	0.6	4,190	0.2	—N/a	—N/a	—N/a	—N/a	10,464	0.6	—N/a	—N/a	—N/a	—N/a	30,529	1.6
Scotland	5,493,842	2,110,405	38.8	2,780,900	51.1	119,872	2.2	29,929	0.6	15,501	0.3	19,113	0.4	12,425	0.2	5,847	0.1	10,988	0.2	30,529	1.6
Switzerland	8,680,980	5,321,440	61.30	2,769,230	31.9	477,450	5.5	30,640	0.40	30,640	0.40	—N/a	—N/a	7,660	0.10	—N/a	—N/a	22,980	0.30		
Wales	3,107,494	1,354,773	46.5	1,446,398	43.6	66,947	2.2	12,242	0.4	10,075	0.3	6,481	0.2	9,445	0.3	2,044	0.1	4,048	0.1	195,041	6.3
Total	175,651,092	85,298,950	48.56	65,250,842	37.15	8,674,704	4.94	1,131,624	0.64	1,748,536	1.00	125,393	0.07	1,507,180	0.86	933,170	0.53	560,391	0.32	9,884,394	5.63

== See also ==
- Buddhism by country
- Christianity in Europe
- Eastern Orthodoxy by country
- Europeanism
- Hinduism by country
- Irreligion (no faith) by country
- Islam by country
- Judaism by country
- List of religious populations
- Major world religions
- Oriental Orthodoxy by country
- Protestantism by country
- Post Christianity
- Religion in the European Union
- Roman Catholicism by country
