= Irreligion in Greece =

Irreligion in Greece covers the history, demographics, organisations, legal disputes, and public debate relating to atheism, agnosticism, secularism, and nonreligious identity in Greece. While a large majority of the population consistently identifies as Greek Orthodox, in many surveys the proportion of people describing themselves as nonreligious, atheist, or agnostic has shown variability across polls and has been the focus of legal and public debates, particularly around religious instruction in schools and the recording of religion on official documents.

Religion in Greece (U.S. Department of State 2022)
1. Greek Orthodox (85.0%)
2. Other Christians (3.00%)
3. Islam (2.00%)
4. Other religions (1.00%)
5. Unaffiliated (9.00%)

== Lead statistics ==
Most major surveys place a clear plurality or majority of Greeks as identifying with the Greek Orthodox Church, but estimates of nonreligious and atheist identification vary by question wording, sample, and year. The U.S. Department of State summarised that estimates place those identifying as Greek Orthodox at roughly between 81 and 90%, depending on the poll, and that self-identified atheists or nonreligious respondents range across polls from 4 to 15%.

According to a 2022 nationwide survey conducted by the Greek think tank Dianeosis, belief in God in Greece shows significant variation by age. Overall, approximately 78.7% of respondents stated that they believe in God. Among younger age groups, levels of non-belief were notably higher. The survey found that 34.2% of respondents aged 17–24 reported that they do not believe in God, while 21% of those aged 25–39 expressed the same view. The study also reported that younger respondents tended to express lower levels of closeness to religion compared with older age groups.

Religious affiliation in Greece (2018)
1. Believe in God (82.0%)
2. Irreligious / Indifferent (18.0%)
Religious affiliation in Greece (2024)
1. Believe in God (73.0%)
2. Irreligious / Indifferent (27.0%)

== Demographics ==
A 2024 Dianeosis Metron Analysis based survey on "What Greeks believe", reported that although 80% of respondents stated belief in God in earlier decades, a rise in indifference to religious belief has been recorded, with 27% describing themselves as indifferent in the 2024 survey, while 6 years prior in 2018, only 18% of respondents reported indifference to religion. The same report noted lower levels of routine religious practice for many respondents.

A different Metron Analysis survey published in To Vima in December 2024 found that 66% of respondents said they had a religion, but only 15% of those attended church regularly, showing a gap between self-identification and actual practice.

== History and social context ==
Irreligion and secular critique in modern Greece developed alongside European secularisation processes and domestic social change after the Second World War and the end of the Greek junta era. Public discussion intensified in the 2000s and 2010s as civil-society organisations campaigned for stricter separation of church and state, changes to the role of religion in public education, and removal of religion from certain official documents.

Organised secular activism became more visible in the 2010s with associations and legal actions challenging administrative practices that recorded religion on identity documents and education certificates.

== Irreligion in Politics ==
Alexis Tsipras made history on 26 January 2015, when he was sworn in as Greece's youngest prime minister in 150 years. Notably, he became the first openly atheist Greek prime minister and the first to take a secular oath of office.

During his inauguration at the Presidential Palace, Tsipras chose to pledge allegiance to the Greek Constitution and the Greek people rather than swear on the Bible, departing from the traditional religious oath customary in Greek politics. Cabinet members were given the choice between a religious or civil oath. Several ministers, including Rena Dourou, the newly elected governor of the Attica region, opted for a secular oath.

Tsipras's decision and the choices of his cabinet members marked a significant moment in Greece's political landscape, reflecting the growing visibility of secular and irreligious perspectives in public office.

== Legal issues and education ==
Legal disputes about religion in education and civil registration have been prominent. In 2019, the Plenary of the Council of State heard challenges brought by the Atheist Union of Greece and parents against ministerial acts that provided for the inclusion of students' religion on secondary-school leaving certificates and other education documents; the case was widely reported, and the court reserved its decision.

Following litigation and administrative steps, the Council of State issued rulings and the education ministry adjusted procedures for exemptions from religious classes and for the handling of religion as a data field on school documentation. Media reports and legal summaries show a sequence of cases and ministerial responses between 2019 and 2023.

== Organisations ==
The Atheist Union of Greece (Greek: Ένωση Αθέων) is a non-profit association dedicated to defending the rights of atheists, promoting secularism, and advocating for the separation of church and state. According to the union, the organisation was founded in 2010 and was legally recognised in 2012. It is governed by an elected secretariat and funded primarily by member contributions and donations. The union has pursued legal challenges, including cases about the recording of religion on diplomas and the exemption procedure for religious instruction, and cooperates with international secular networks.

The Atheist Union of Greece is listed among affiliates and partner campaigns reported by international secular networks, including Atheist Alliance International, in relation to campaigns for secular education in Greece.

== See also ==
- Atheism in Europe
- Atheist Union of Greece
- Religion in Greece
- Secularism
