= Ukrainian Evangelical Reformed Church =

Ukrainian Protestant Church

- Classification: Protestant
- Orientation: Calvinist
- Polity: Presbyterian
- Associations: Union of Evangelical Reformed Churches of Ukraine
- Region: Ukraine
- Origin: 1989
- Branched from: Reformed Churches in the Netherlands (Liberated)
- Congregations: 8 (2010)
- Official website: uerc.org.ua

The Ukrainian Evangelical Reformed Church (UERC) – in Ukrainian Українська реформатська євангельська церква – is a Protestant Reformed Ukraine, formed from the work of missionaries from the Reformed Churches in the Netherlands (Liberated).

== History ==
The Reformed Faith arrived in Ukraine since the 16th century, having spread throughout the territory that would form the Polish–Lithuanian Commonwealth. The region with the highest concentration of retired people until World War I was Transcarpathia, which formerly belonged to Austria-Hungary. Canadian Presbyterian missions served the expansion of the Reformed Faith in the country during the early 20th century. However, after the formation of the Soviet Union, religious freedom was severely restricted in the Ukrainian territory.

Beginning in 1989, missionary Fylymon Semenyuk began missionary work in Rivne and Stepan, with support from Reformed Churches in the Netherlands (Liberated). Subsequently, the denomination spread throughout the country, reaching Kyiv, Khmelnitsky, Svalyava and Tavrian. In 2010, it was formed by 8 churches.

== Seminar ==
In 2001 the UERC and the Evangelical Presbyterian Church of Ukraine, another Reformed denomination in the country, formed the and Union of Evangelical Reformed Churches of Ukraine (UERCU), recognized by the government in October 2001. Although the previous denominations continue to exist independently, this union holds joint meetings annually. In the same year of its foundation, the UERCU started the Reformed Evangelical Seminary. Since then, the seminary has served to train pastors of both denominations.

== Doctrine ==
As a denomination Continental Reformed, the UERC subscribes to the Three Forms of Unity (Heidelberg Catechism, Canons of Dort and Belgic Confession) as expositions faithful to biblical doctrines.
