= Atheist Union of Greece =

Non-profit organization

- Ένωση Αθέων
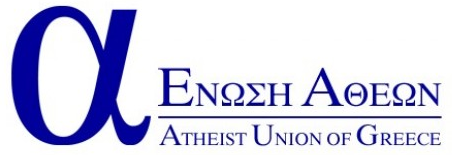
- Abbreviation: AUG
- Formation: 27 November 2012; 13 years ago
- Type: Nonprofit - Union
- Headquarters: Athens, Greece
- Region served: Worldwide
- Main organ: General Assembly of Members
- Website: union.atheia.gr

The Atheist Union of Greece (Greek: Ένωση Αθέων, romanized: Enosi Atheon) is a non-profit organization (union) dedicated to the defense of the rights of Greek atheists, the separation of church and state and the secularization of the state. It is based in Athens, having thousands of members from all over Greece and abroad.

== Principles of Operation - Administration ==
The Atheist Union of Greece was founded in 2010 by volunteers. Since 2012, it has been a legally recognized union, with a court-approved statute of operation. It does not adopt any political, party or religious ideology. and is financed by the contributions and donations of its members. It is governed by an elected five-member secretariat, and decisions are taken by the general assembly of its members.

== Activities - Action ==
The Atheist Union organizes actions to inform the public, submits reasoned requests to the Greek state regarding the assurance of the rights of Greek atheists (exemption from the religion course, cessation of documenting/recording religious information in public documents, civil oaths (as derived from the European directives and the Constitution), crematorium licensing and more), issues press releases to inform the Greek atheist community as well as participates in relevant counsels of the European Union. Finally, it informs the public about its rights, providing informative material and specialized legal information on the issues related to its objectives.

In April 2015, the Atheists Union organized, for the first time in Athens, a lecture with Richard Dawkins. Dawkins signed books and answered questions from the audience gathered by the Atheists Union. The event had an impressive attendance, with a huge queue of people waiting to enter the hall.

In March 2016, the Atheists' Union organized the scientific lecture "Science and Religion" with Professor of Psychology George Paxinos as well as Dimitris Platis and Spyros Sfendurakis.

In December 2022, the Atheist Union organized the scientific conference "Education and Religion" at Panteion University with the participation of more than fifteen lecturers. Among others were Nikolaos Filis, Petros Tatsopoulos, Grigoris Vallianatos and Penelope Fundedaki.

In September 2018, the Atheist Union of Greece appealed to the Council of State against the recording of religion in high school diplomas. In addition, AUG appealed to the Personal Data Protection Authority for the same issue. In September 2019, a pertinent decision was issued ordering the ministry to end the registration of religion in the graduation certificates.

In March 2021, on the occasion of the 200th anniversary of the Greek Revolution, the Atheist Union organized an online event "1821: the role of the church in the revolution".

In March 2017, the Atheist Union organized the scientific conference "State and Church: Approaches" at Panteion University with the participation of renowned lawyers such as Michael Stathopoulos and Penelope Fundedaki.

In 2022, AUG appealed to the Council of State again, together with students' families, against the Joint Ministerial Decision Exempting Religious Students from the Course, because it requires the disclosure of religious beliefs. The Supreme Court heard the appeal in March 2023, while the decision is awaited.

At the same time, it has many years of humanitarian action, maintaining the permanent campaign "Do Good Without God!" which includes mass blood donations, as well as collecting essential items (food, medicine and clothing) and distributing them to humanitarian organizations.

== See also ==
- Atheism
- Humanism
- Secularism
