= Evangelical Presbyterian Church in England and Wales =

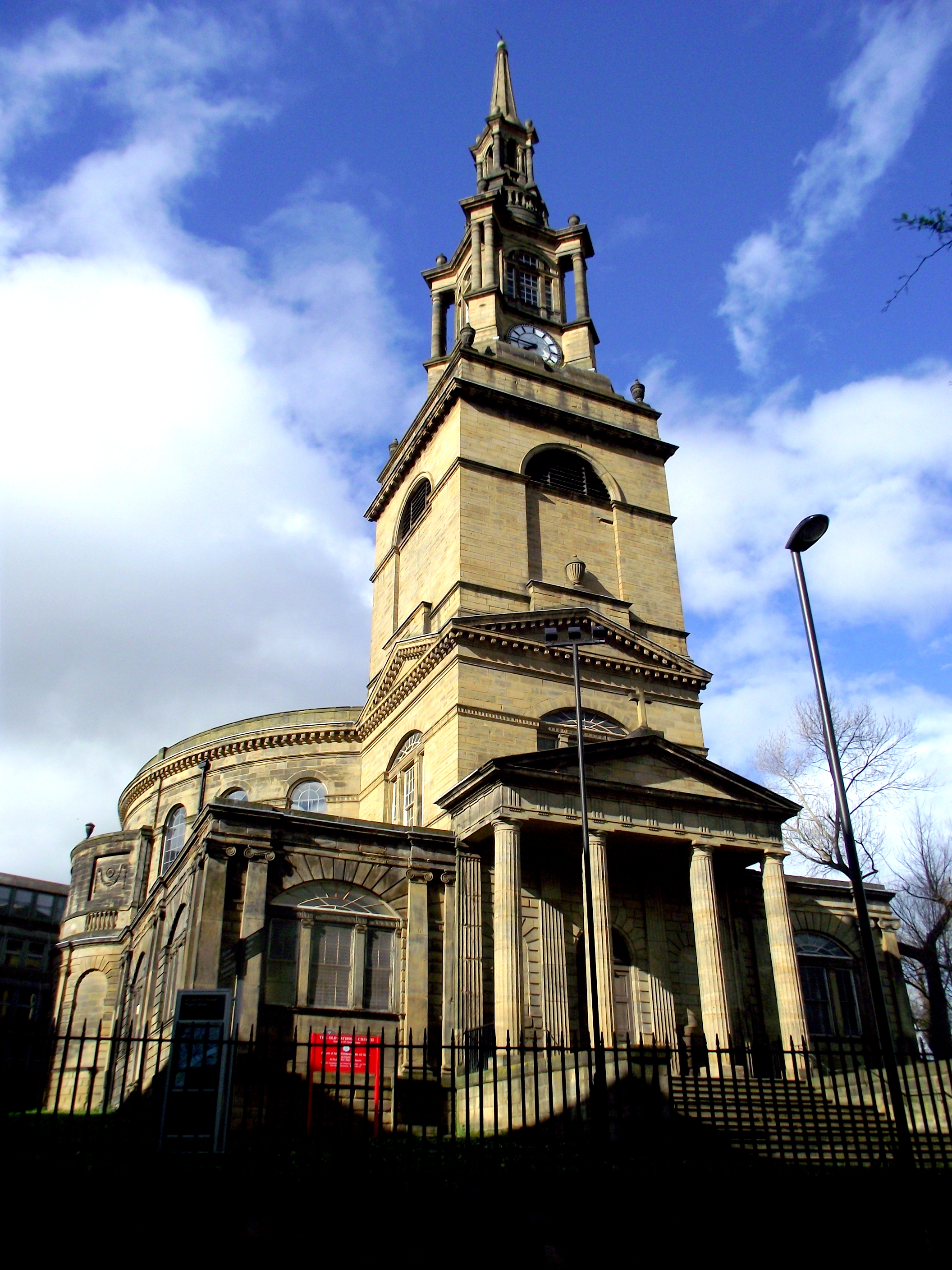
- Polity: Presbyterian
- Clerk of Presbytery: Falko Drijfhout
- Associations: International Conference of Reformed Churches
- Region: England, Wales, Sweden, Switzerland, Germany
- Origin: 1996
- Congregations: 23
- Publications: The Presbyterian Network
- www.epcew.org.uk

The Evangelical Presbyterian Church in England and Wales (EPCEW) (Welsh: Eglwys Bresbyteraidd Efengylaidd yng Nghymru a Lloegr) is a reformed and conservative evangelical Presbyterian denomination based in England and Wales with churches in Germany, Switzerland, and Sweden. Founded in 1996, denominational growth has been steady but the denomination remains small with around 20 congregations.

== History ==
In the second half of the twentieth century, the work of the Edinburgh-based Banner of Truth Trust resulted in a growing interest in England and Wales in Reformed, confessional and connectional Christianity. In 1986, a Presbyterian conference was held in a Free Church of Scotland chapel in London, where a vision of a new Presbyterian denomination in England was proposed, which was to be faithful to Scripture and adhere to the Westminster Confession. As a consequence, the Presbyterian Association in England was formed in 1987 from several small Christian groups and existing congregations with efforts at church planting following. In 1991, an interim Presbytery was formed with congregations in Blackburn, Cambridge, Chelmsford, Durham and Hull to work towards the establishment of the new denomination. This came to fruition in 1996, taking the name, Evangelical Presbyterian Church in England and Wales.

In the following years, the denomination grew significantly with a number of congregations joining the EPCEW and others being planted by existing churches. In part, this was due to support from missionaries from the Presbyterian Church in America. In 2000, two congregations in Cardiff were accepted into the EPCEW. By 2005, the denomination comprised nine congregations with six in England and three in Wales. By 2010 the total had risen to 15 and, notably, this included two congregations in Sweden. Five years later, the total number of congregations had risen to 17 and this included one congregation in Sweden and one in Germany.

In 2016 the EPCEW expressed its desire to continue to plant churches and Oxford Presbyterian Church was planted in 2018. By 2020, there were 20 congregations in the denomination while in 2021 a further two church plants were made, in Gloucester and Zurich.

Several EPCEW ministers were instrumental in the 2020 founding of Westminster Presbyterian Theological Seminary in Gateshead, England.

In 2024, the congregations at Sheffield, Lincoln, Blackburn and Bury St Edmunds announced their intention to separate from EPCEW. As of November 2025, these churches were no longer counted by EPCEW as belonging to the denomination with a consequential fall to 18 congregations in the denomination.

== Congregations ==
As of 2020, the denomination has twenty-three congregations and church plants at:

=== England ===
Congregation	Town or City	Minister	Website	Image
All Saints Presbyterian Church	Newcastle Upon Tyne	Rev Benjamin Wontrop		
Cambridge Presbyterian Church	Cambridge	Rev Douglas McCallum		
Chelmsford Presbyterian Church	Chelmsford	Rev Darren Moore		
Durham Presbyterian Church	Durham	Rev Phil Baiden		
East Hull Presbyterian Church	Hull	Vacant		
Hexham Presbyterian Church	Hexham	Vacant		
Naunton Lane Evangelical Presbyterian Church	Leckhampton, Cheltenham	Rev Matt Faux		
Oxford Presbyterian Church	Oxford (Northgate Hall)	Rev Andy Young		
Solihull Presbyterian Church	Solihull	Rev Tom Hutchings		
Sunderland Evangelical Presbyterian Church	Sunderland	Rev Nathan Hilton		
Whaddon Road Evangelical Presbyterian Church	Cheltenham	Rev David Pfeiffer, Rev Larry Wilkes		
Gloucester Evangelical Presbyterian Church	Gloucester	Rev Michael Cochran, Rev Tim Dalton		

=== Wales ===
Congregation	Town or City	Minister	Website	Image
Christ Presbyterian Church	Barry	Rev Dr Drew Goodman		
Bethel Presbyterian Church	Cardiff	Rev Andrew Graham		
Immanuel Presbyterian Church	Cardiff	Rev Dr Peter Naylor		
Ely Presbyterian Church	Ely, Cardiff	Rev Philip Haines		

=== Sweden ===
- Tranås, Sweden

=== Germany ===
- Berlin, Germany
- Villingen-Schwenningen, Germany

=== Switzerland ===
- Zurich, Switzerland

=== Number of congregations ===
Denominational growth has been steady as seen in the following table.

Year	Number of congregations	Notes
2000	6	Five congregations in England and one in Wales.
2005	9	Six congregations in England and three in Wales.
2010	15	Includes two congregations in Sweden.
2015	17	Includes one congregation in Sweden and one congregation in Germany.
2020	20	There are 20 established churches with a congregation in Sweden and another in Germany.
2025	22	There are 22 established churches, including congregations in Sweden, in Germany and in Switzerland.

== Publications ==
The denomination publishes The Presbyterian Network in Spring and Autumn with theological and pastoral articles and news from its congregations.

== International organisations ==
Along with the Free Church of Scotland and the Free Church of Scotland (Continuing), the denomination is one of the three members of the International Conference of Reformed Churches from Great Britain, and one of seven European Christian denominations who founded the European Conference of Reformed Churches. The denomination has a co-operative agreement with the Presbyterian Church in America and maintains relations with the Evangelical Presbyterian Church in Northern Ireland.

== See also ==
- English Presbyterianism
