= Evangelical Presbyterian Church of Ukraine =

- Classification: Protestant
- Theology: Calvinist, confessional Reformed
- Governance: Presbyterian
- Region: Ukraine
- Branched from: Presbyterian Church in America planted the first congregations in the mid-1990s
- Congregations: 12
- Members: <1,500

The Evangelical Presbyterian Church of Ukraine is a conservative Evangelical Protestant denomination in the Reformed tradition. It holds to the presbyterian form of church governance and to the Reformed theology of the Westminster Standards.

== Origin ==
The Evangelical Presbyterian Church of Ukraine (EPCU) was recognised as an independent national denomination on April 16, 2008 in Odesa, Ukraine. At the time of organisation, the denomination had one presbytery comprising three particularised churches and 8 mission churches. As of 2012 the Evangelical Presbyterian Church has 12 churches and missions in various parts of Ukraine. The EPCU was started by missionaries of the Presbyterian Church in America in the early 1990s. Holy Trinity Presbyterian Church in Kyiv has been the largest congregation. There are congregations in 9 various cities.

== History ==
It's a little-known fact that the Reformation came this far eastward, approximately 100 Reformed churches existed between 1570 - 1590. In the 1930s Canadian-Ukrainian missionaries revitalized the Reformed faith in Western Ukraine which was then part of Poland. Separate German Reformed and Lutheran communities - the Evangelical Church of the Augsburg and Helvetic Confession - joined the "Union of Reformed Communities". Before the invasion of the Red Army, there were 35 churches in 5 districts and approximately 3,000 members in cities like Kolomyia, Lviv, Rivne, Przemyśl, Stepan. The Ukrainian Evangelical Reformed Church had 18 ordained pastors. After World War II the Communist regime destroyed much of this work.

After the break up of the Soviet Union, short term PCA mission teams began working in various Ukrainian cities. They formed church planting teams to shepherd the forming religious communities. The church in Odesa was the first church to be particularized in the history of the denomination. In 1998, the Ukrainian government granted the Evangelical Presbyterian Church in Odesa the 100-year-old historic building that had housed a reformed congregation before the advent of communist restrictions to religious practice. During Communist times, the building had been seized and turned into a puppet theater. The 1,300 square foot building was built in 1898, and seats 500. Upon regaining possession of the building, the Presbyterian Church renovated it and installed an organ. Weekly attendance is more than 100 and expanded in five various cities. It has become a center for church planters in Ukraine. The Evangelical Presbyterian Church was officially organized at a celebration service on April 16, 2008 in the Ukrainian city of Odesa.

The Belgorod Christian Clinic is a ministry of the Evangelical Presbyterian Church in Belgorod-Dnestrovsky. The Belgorod Presbyterian Church was the first local church planted by MTW missionaries in Ukraine.

== Missions ==
The church has mission churches in various cities, and has plans to plant many new churches in the coming years. There are mission teams in Kyiv, Odesa, Lviv, and Kherson. The first outreach to Western Ukraine is taking place through the Lviv church plant. In that beautiful city there is an international, cross-cultural church planting team that is building relationships with people, including through English and mercy ministries. The goal is to have 44 Presbyterian churches in the next 15 years. The biggest goal to become financial self-supporting.

== Reformed Seminary in Ukraine ==
A reformed seminary The Evangelical Reformed Seminary of Ukraine was opened to train pastors and officers. M.Div classes begun in 2000 with 20 students. In the Evangelical Reformed Seminary theology classes are taught by qualified teachers and guest professors from Canada, the United States, the Netherlands, South Africa and the United Kingdom. The founder of the seminary is Dr. Clay Quarterman. The current president is Rev. Erik van Alten.

== Theology ==
=== Confessional Standards ===
- Westminster Confession of Faith
- Westminster Larger Catechism
- Westminster Shorter Catechism

=== Other respected Reformed confessions ===
- Belgic Confession
- Second Helvetic Confession
- Heidelberg Catechism
- Canons of Dort

=== Ecumenial Creeds ===
- Apostles Creed
- Nicene Creed
- Athanasian Creed

== See also ==
- Protestantism in Ukraine
- Presbyterianism
- Reformed Church in Transcarpathia
