= Valdis Celms =

Latvian graphic designer

- Born: 24 October 1943 (age 82); Vildogas pagasts, Sigulda Municipality, Reichskommissariat Ostland
- Education: Art Academy of Latvia
- Occupations: Artist, graphic designer, religious leader
- Spouse: Gunta Celma

Valdis Celms (born 24 October 1943) is a Latvian artist, graphic designer and neopagan leader. He is known for his kinetic art and is one of the leaders of the Baltic neopagan organization Latvijas Dievtuŗu sadraudze.

== Early life and education ==
Valdis Celms was born on 24 October 1943 in Vildogas pagasts, Sigulda Municipality. He was educated at the Riga Construction College and the Department of Industrial Art at the Art Academy of Latvia.

== Art and design ==
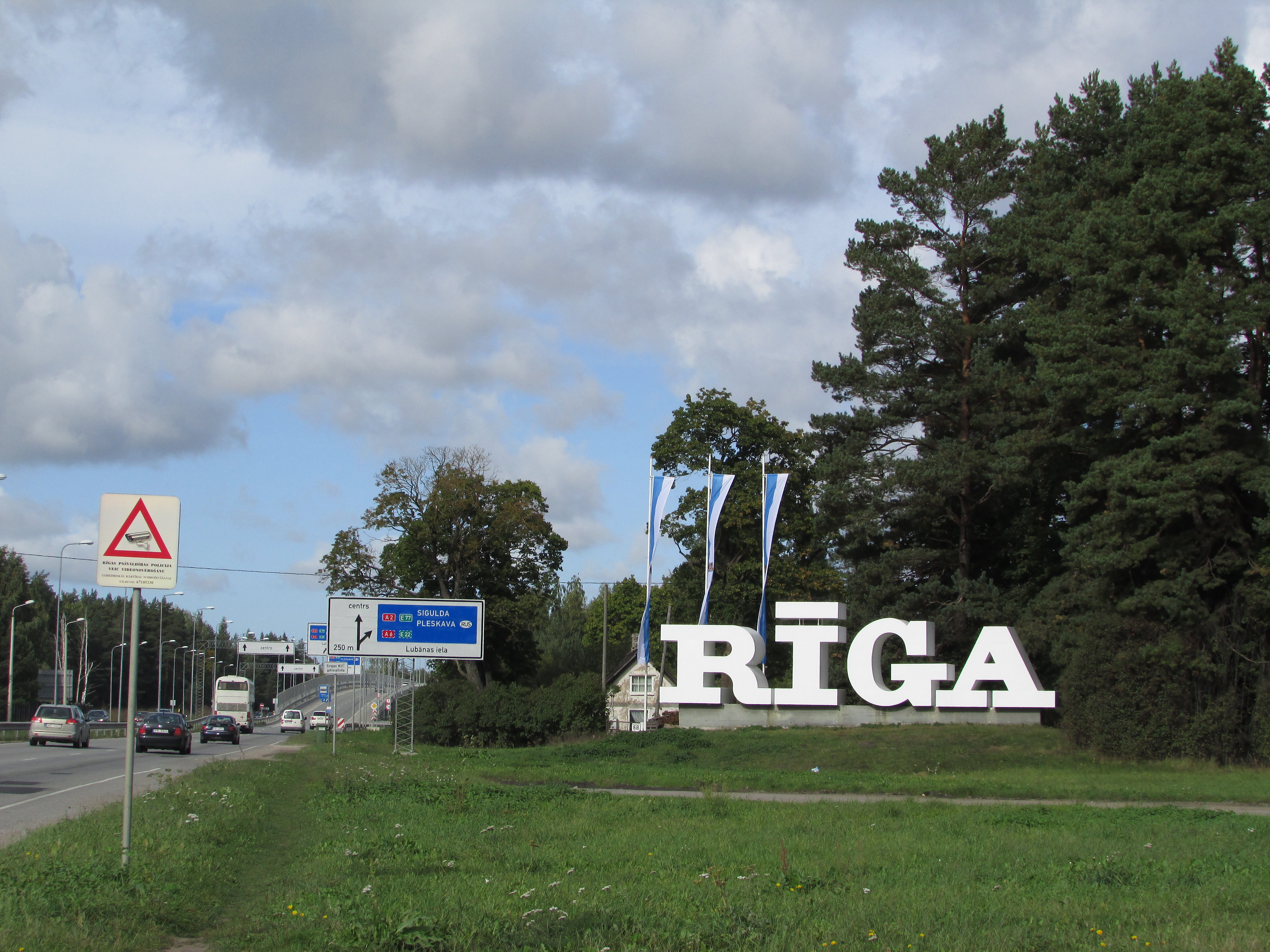
Riga border road sign designed by Celms

Celms is considered one of the founders of kinetic art in Latvia due to his exploration of the artform in the 1960s. He became prominent in the Latvian artworld in the 1970s with his kinetic art, photomontages and graphic design. For his kinetic art, he combined modern materials and needs with influences from folk art and tried to emulate the movements of nature. Some of the more ambitious kinetic sculptures he designed in the 1970s were not realized at the time, but have been built and exhibited after the fall of the Soviet Union. In 1980 he designed the large "Rīga" signs that welcome people as they enter the Latvian capital through its main roads.

A large retrospective of Celms' artworks was held at the Latvian Museum of Decorative Arts and Design in 2013 to celebrate his 70th birthday. In 2014 he was awarded the Order of the Three Stars from the Latvian state.

== Pagan revivalism ==
Celms is one of the leaders of the Baltic neopagan group Latvijas Dievtuŗu sadraudze. In this capacity he led the team that created the Lokstene Shrine of Dievturi on an island in the Daugava river, inaugurated in 2017. In 2007, he published the book Latvju raksts un zīmes (lit. 'Latvian Patterns and Symbols') which went on to sell well. In 2016, he published Baltu dievestības pamati (lit. 'Fundamentals of the Baltic Religion'), where he, influenced by Ernests Brastiņš, Marija Gimbutas and Janīna Kursīte-Pakule, gives an introduction to the Baltic deities and how to be aware of them.

== Publications ==
- Latvju raksts un zīmes: baltu pasaules modelis: uzbūve, tēli, simbolika. Folkloras informācijas centrs, Riga 2007, ISBN 978-9984-39-019-2.
- Baltu dievestības pamati. Izdevniecība Lauku Avīze, Riga 2016, ISBN 978-9934-15-241-2
