= Brastiņš =

Family name

Brastiņš is a Latvian surname.

Notable people with the surname include:

- Arvīds Brastiņš (1893–1984), Latvian sculptor, writer and neopagan leader
- Ernests Brastiņš (1892–1942), Latvian artist, amateur historian, folklorist and neopagan leader
