= Vilnis Salaks =

Latvian composer

Vilnis Salaks (18 January 1939 - 17 May 2021 ) was a Latvian composer, music teacher, folklore researcher and kokle player.

== Biography ==
Salaks was born on January 18, 1939 in Riga to the family of conductor, choirmaster and composer, Artūrs Salaks. At the age of 14, Salaks moved to Riga where he studied at Jāzeps Mediņš Music High School (Latvian: Jāzepa Mediņa Rīgas Mūzikas vidusskola). In 2003, he obtained a Master's degree in Music. From 1962 to 2009, he taught composition and theoretical subjects at Jāzeps Mediņš Music High School. He also lectured at the Jāzeps Vītols Latvian Academy of Music. Salaks became a member of the Latvian Composers' Union in 1985.

== Works ==
The composer's output includes four symphonies, two symphonic poems, five concertos, as well as suites and works written for every instrument of the symphony orchestra. In total, Salaks created more than 1700 compositions.

== Awards ==
- the Ernests Brastiņš and Arvīds Brastiņš Memorial Award
- the "White Sparrow" (Latvian: Baltais zvirbulis) Annual Award of the Riga City Council
