= List of modern pagan temples =

This article is a list of modern pagan temples and other religious buildings and structures, sorted alphabetically by country and city.

== Armenia ==
- Temple of Garni

== Brazil ==
- Piaga Temple (Templo Piaga), Vila Pagã, José de Freitas, Piauí
- Piaga Temple of Souls (Templo Piaga das Almas), Vila Pagã, José de Freitas
- Templo Casa Telucama, Lauro de Freitas, Bahia
- Templo de Atégina e Endovélico, Vila Pagã, Piauí
- Templo de Janus, Vila Pagã, Piauí
- Santuário dos Lobos, São José do Rio Preto, São Paulo
- Círculo de Brigantia (Brigantia's circle temple) [Rio de Janeiro

== Denmark ==
- Manheim, Korinth

== Greece ==
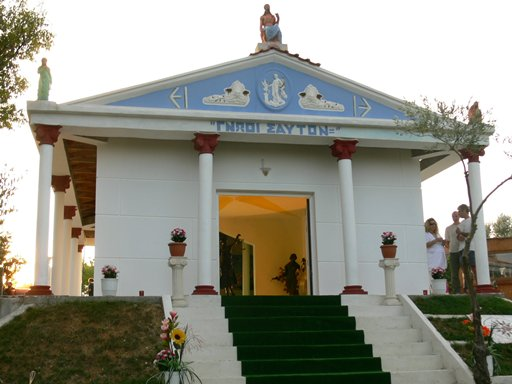
Hellenic temple in Oraiokastro, Greece

- Temple of Alexander and the Earth (Ναός του Αλεξάνδρου και της Γης), in Mesaio, Central Macedonia
- Temple of the Hellenic Gods (Ελλήνων Ναός), in Oraiokastro, Central Macedonia.
- Temple of Zeus, Dionysus and Pan (Ναός του Δία, του Διόνυσου και του Πάνα), in Kalliani, Peloponnese.

== Iceland ==
- Ásheimur Hof, Efri Ás, Skagafjörður
- Arctic Henge (Heimskautsgerðið), Raufarhöfn

== Italy ==
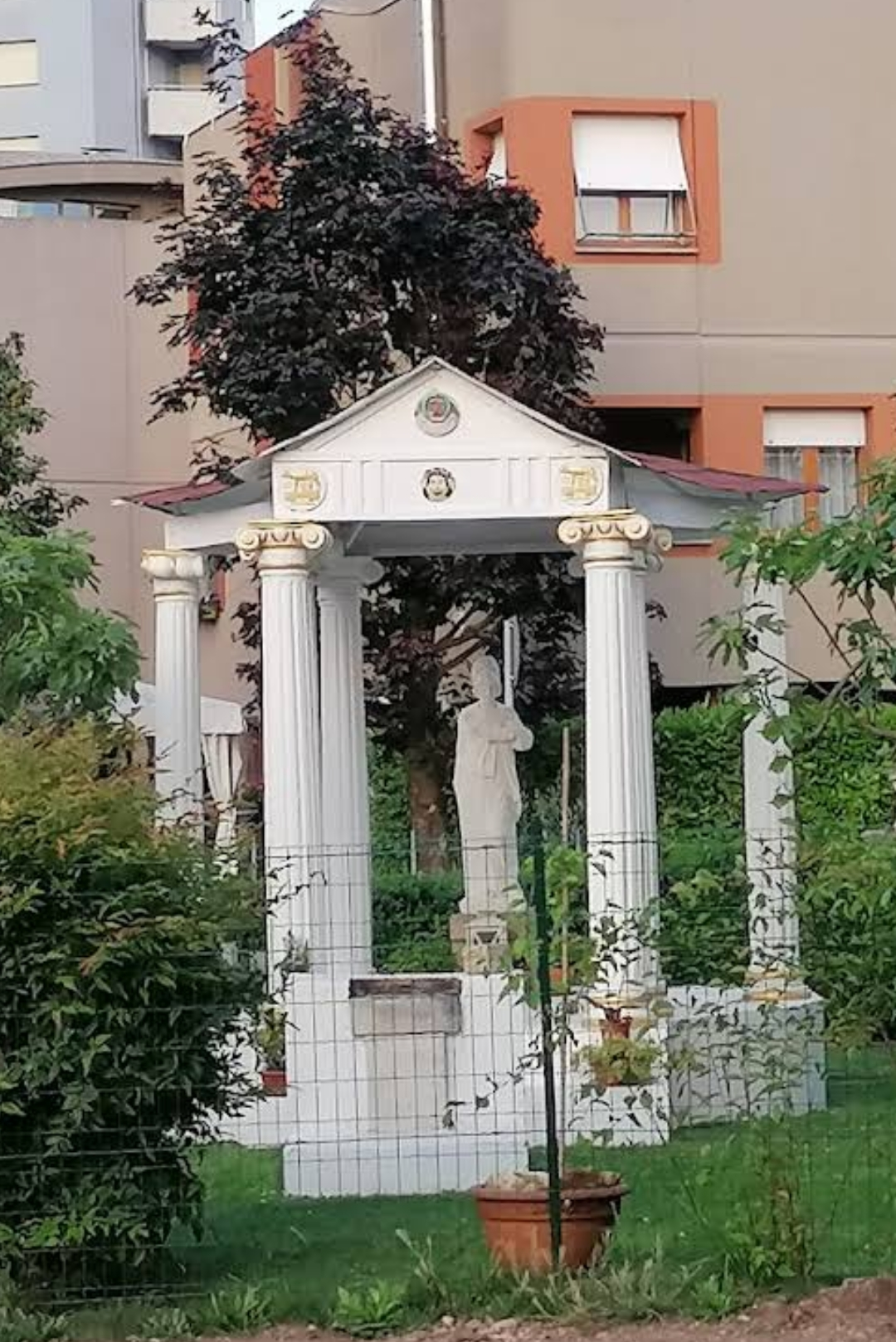
Tempio di Minerva Medica a Pordenone

- Temple of Jupiter (Templum Iovis), Torre Gaia, Rome
- Aedes of Apollo Pithian Hyperborean (Templum Apollinis Pithi Hyperborei), Rome
- Aedes Roma Pietatis, Torre Gaia, Rome
- Aedes Minerva, Torre Gaia, Rome
- Aedes Martis, Torre Gaia, Rome
- Temple of Aegeria (Templum Aegeria), Torre Gaia, Rome
- Temple of Venus Verticordia (Templum Veneris Verticordiae), Torre Gaia, Rome
- Temple of Neptune (Templum Neptuni), Torre Gaia, Rome
- Temple of Mercury (Templum Mercurii), Torre Gaia, Rome
- Aedes Martis, Appia Antica, Rome
- Temple of Apollo (Templum Apollinis), Ardea

Sicily

- Temple of Apollo (Templum Apollinis), Palermo
- Temple of Neptune (Temple Neptuni), Palermo
- Temple of Ceres (Templum Cereris), Enna, Leonforte
- Temple of Herakles (Templum Herculis), Enna, Leonforte

Apulia

- Temple of Apollo (Templum Apollinis), Taranto

Veneto

- Temple of Minerva Medica (Templum Minervae Medicae), Pordenone

== Latvia ==
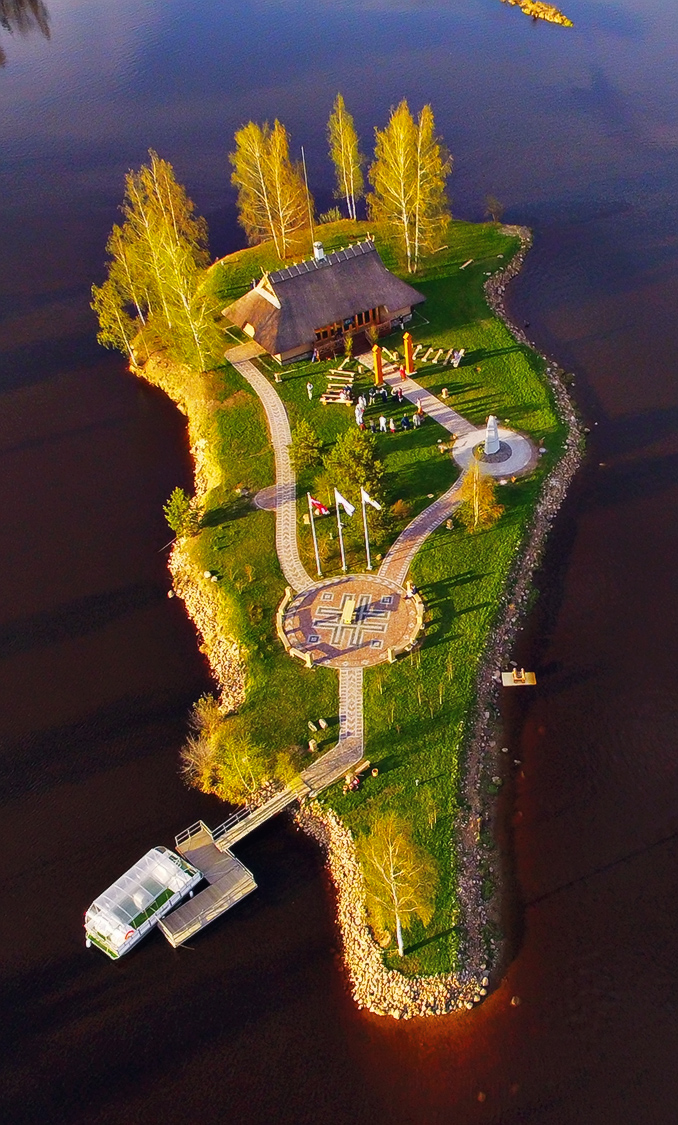
Aerial view of Lokstene Shrine of Dievturi in Latvia

- Dzintari Shrine of Dievturi (est. 1930, Dzintaru svētnīca), Talsi
- Svēte Shrine of Dievturi (est. 2001, Svētes svētnīca), Jelgava
- Lokstene Shrine of Dievturi (est. 2017, Lokstenes svētnīca), Klintaine Parish

== Lithuania ==
- Samogitian Sanctuary (Žemaičių Alkas), Šventoji
- Temple of four gods and four goddesses from Baltic mythology in the undergrounds of Vilnius University.

== Poland ==
- Mazovian Chram of Native Polish Church, Michałowice District, Masovian Voivodeship
- Chram Stokroć of Rodzima Wiara, around Olsztyn, Warmian-Masurian Voivodeship
- Sanctuary of Veles, Wałbrzych, Lower Silesian Voivodeship
- Ślężańskie Trzebiszcze, Ślęża Massif, Lower Silesian Voivodeship

== Russia ==
- Temple of Svarozhich's Fire (Russian: Храм Огня Сварожича) of the Union of Slavic Native Belief Communities, Krasotinka village, Kaluga Oblast
- House of Purification/Archie Diete (Yakut: Арчы Дьиэтэ, romanized: Archie Diete), Tengrist "Aiyy Faith" temple (2002), Yakutsk, Yakutia, taken away by the local authorities
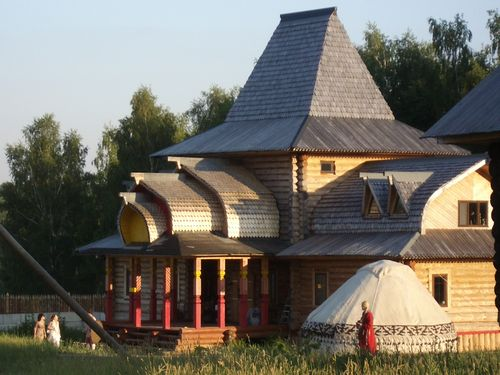
Slavic Kremlin by Sundakov, Podolsky District, Moscow Oblast

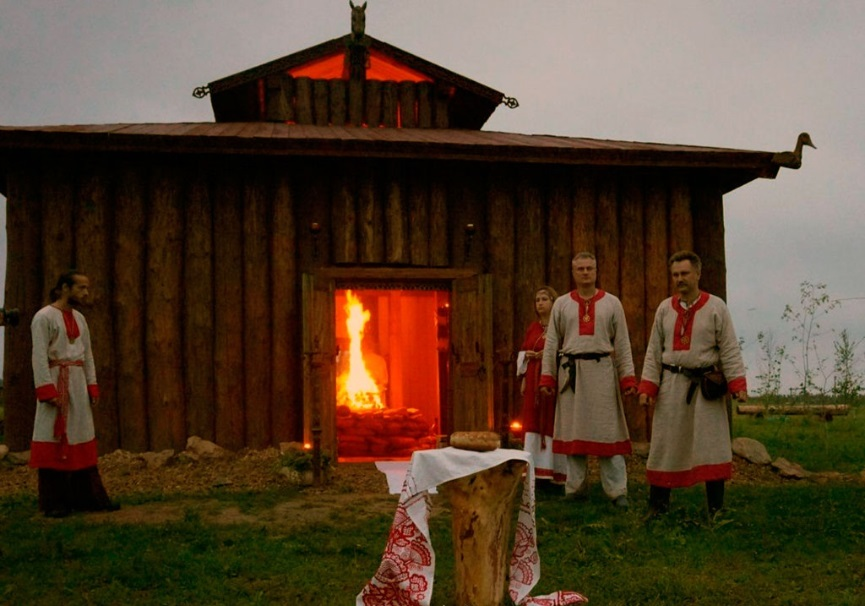
Temple of Svarozhich's Fire, Krasotinka, Kaluga Oblast

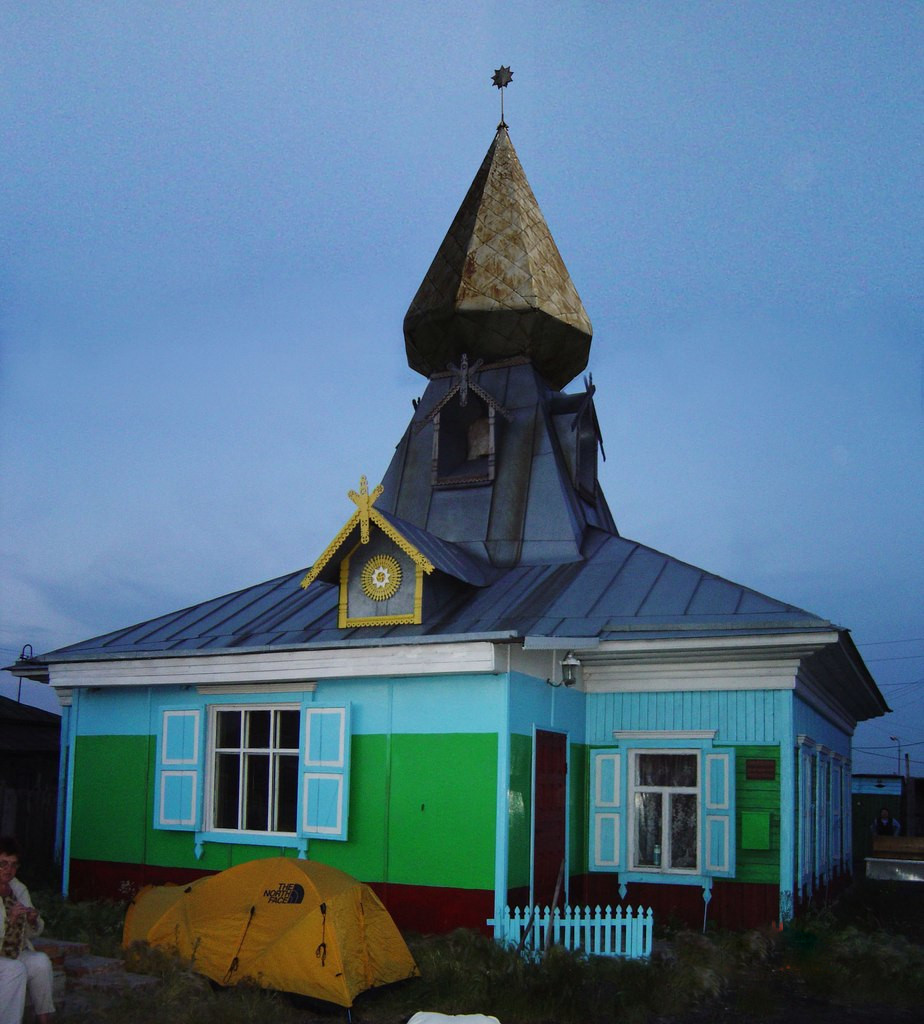
The Ynglist Temple of the Wisdom of Perun, Omsk, before its reconstruction

== Spain ==
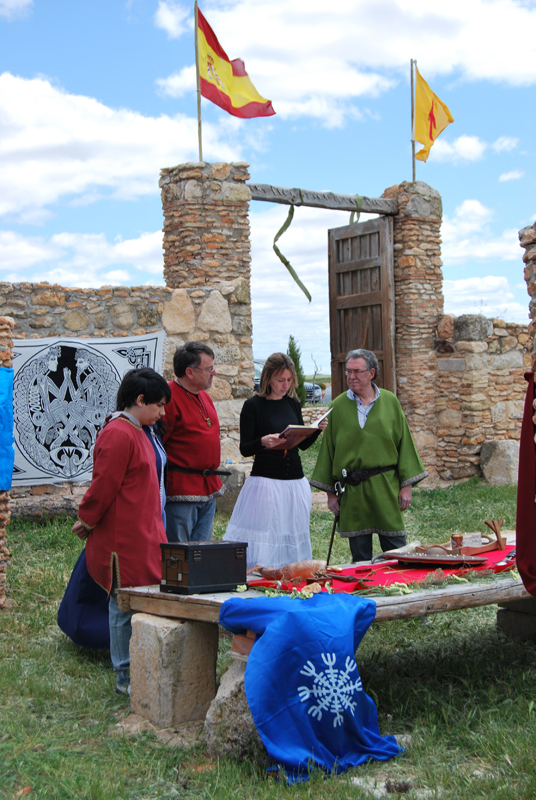
A wedding ceremony at Templo de Gaut in Spain

- Templo de Gaut, Albacete

== United Kingdom ==
- Odinist Fellowship Temple, Newark-On-Trent
- Cerridwen Temple in Avalon Glastonbury
- Glastonbury Goddess Temple
- Bala Goddess Temple, Y Bala, Cymru

== United States ==
- Aquarian Tabernacle Church, Index, Washington
- Baldrshof, Asatru Folk Assembly temple, Murdock, Minnesota
- Church of Eternal Light, Pagan Spiritualist, Bristol, Connecticut
- Church of Mardukite Zuism temples:
  - Borsippa HQ, Monte Vista, Colorado
  - Babylon-Eridu HQ, Mosca, Colorado
- Crestone Ziggurat, Zuist and New Age temple, Crestone, Colorado
- Odinshof, Brownsville, Yuba County, California
- Njörðshof, Asatru Folk Assembly temple, White Springs, Florida
- RUNVira Temple of Mother Ukraine-Oryana, Spring Glen, New York, in the Catskill Mountains
- Isis Oasis Sanctuary, Geyserville, California, California
- Sekhmet Temple, Cactus Springs, Nevada
- Temple to Aphrodite, Camp Midian, Springville, Indiana
- Temple of the Nightshadow, Colorado Springs, Colorado
- The Catskills Phygianum of the Maetreum of Cybele, Palenville, New York
- Thorshof, Asatru Folk Assembly temple, Linden, North Carolina
- Wolfsong Temple, Colorado
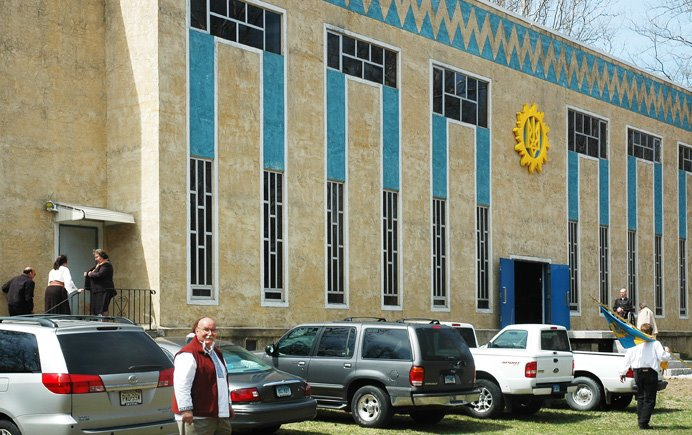
Temple of Mother Ukraine-Oryana of the RUNVira movement, in Spring Glen, New York

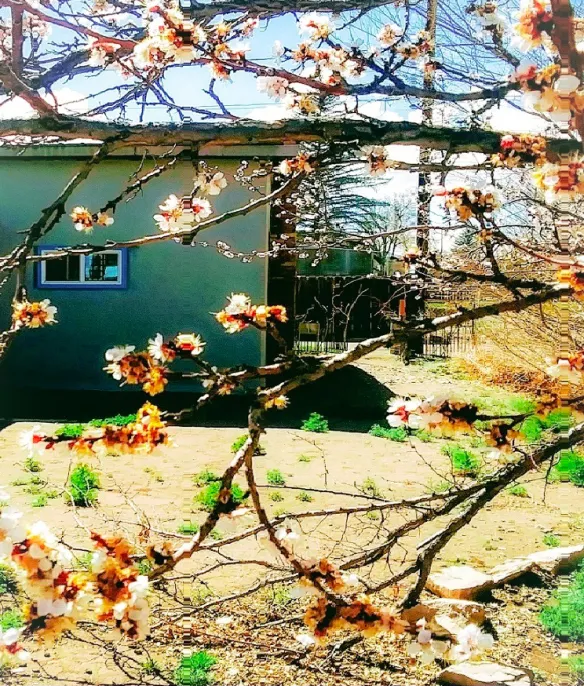
Blossoms of apricot tree at the Borsippa HQ of the Mardukite Zuist Church, in Monte Vista, Colorado

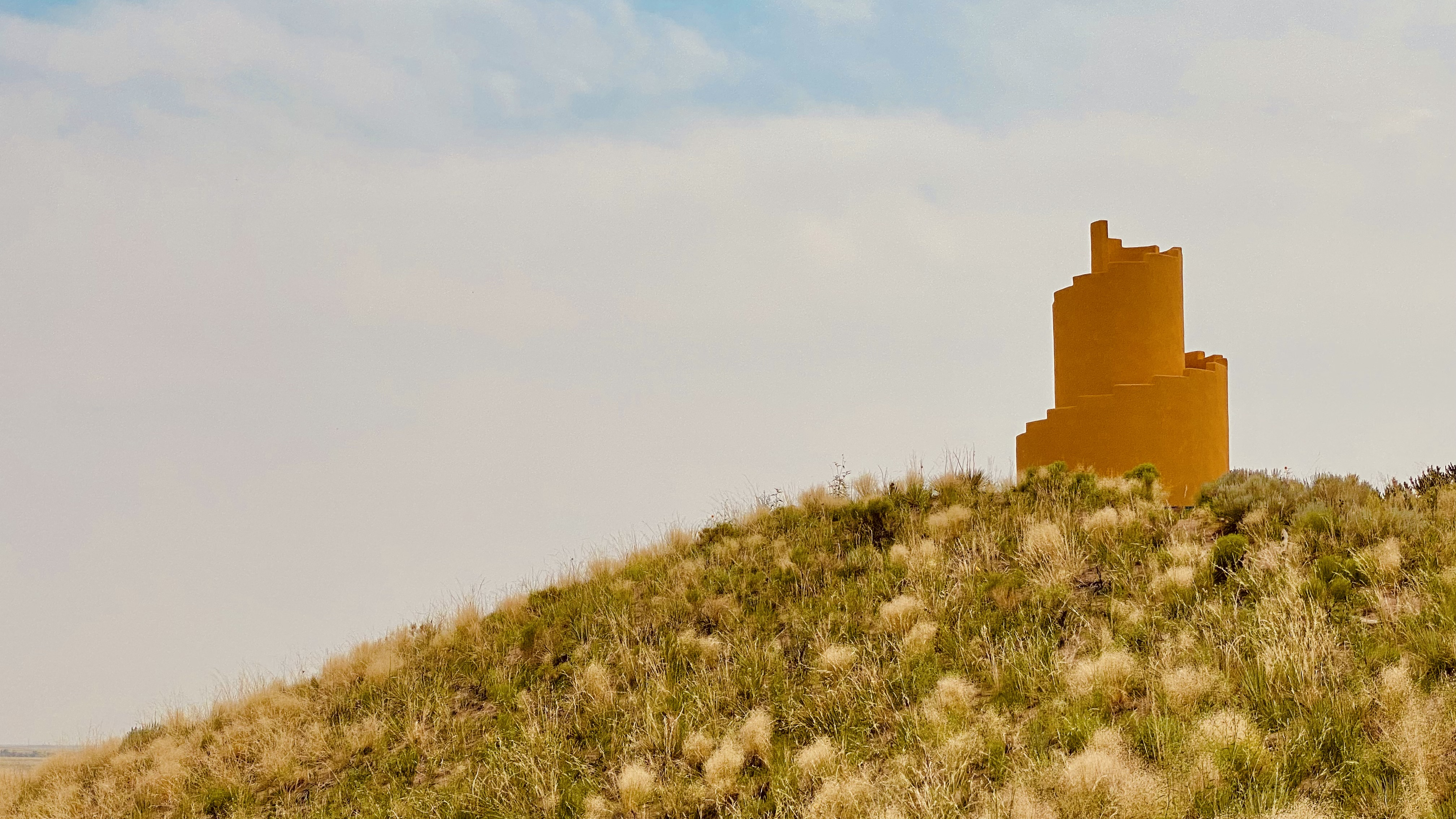
Crestone Ziggurat, in Crestone, Colorado

== Ukraine ==
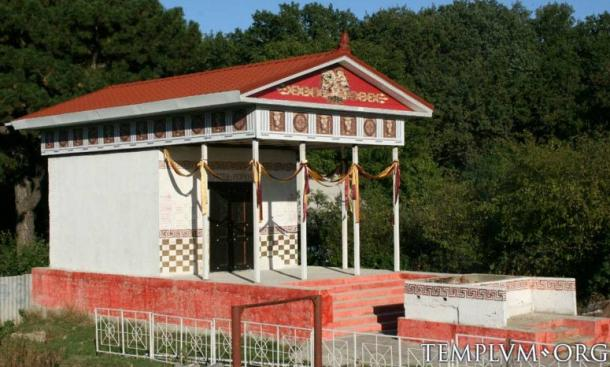
The temple of Iuppiter Perunus in Poltava

- The temple of Iuppiter Perunus, Poltava

== Planned and under construction ==
- Hof Ásatrúarfélagsins is being built by Ásatrúarfélagið in Reykjavík, Iceland. It has been delayed several times and is now being built in separate stages.
- A Slavic Native Faith temple is being built in Wrocław, Poland.
- Centre of the Rodnover Communities of Krasnoyarsk "Rodunitsa" (Общины Родноверов Красноярья "Родуница"; for short: ОРКхолл, ORKxoll), the gorodok (citadel) of the Rodnover communities of Krasnoyarsk, Russia (in progress);
- Ynglist Church temples (planned):
  - Temple of Veles (Капища Велеса), Omsk, Russia;
  - Temple of Yngly (Капища Инглии), Omsk, Russia.
- Slavic Temple in Khabarovsk, Russia (planned).
- Atlanta Heathen Hof, a temple of the group Vör Forn Siðr, is being built 10 miles outside Atlanta, Georgia in the United States. Its projected completion date is 2022.
- The plans for a Native Ukrainian National Faith religious building in the village of Zmiinets outside Lutsk in Ukraine were approved by the local authorities on 7 June 2019.

== See also ==
- List of Ancient Greek temples
- List of Ancient Roman temples
- List of Buddhist temples
- Lists of Hindu temples
- List of Mazu temples
- List of Shinto shrines
