= Ints Cālītis =

Latvian politician (1931–2023)

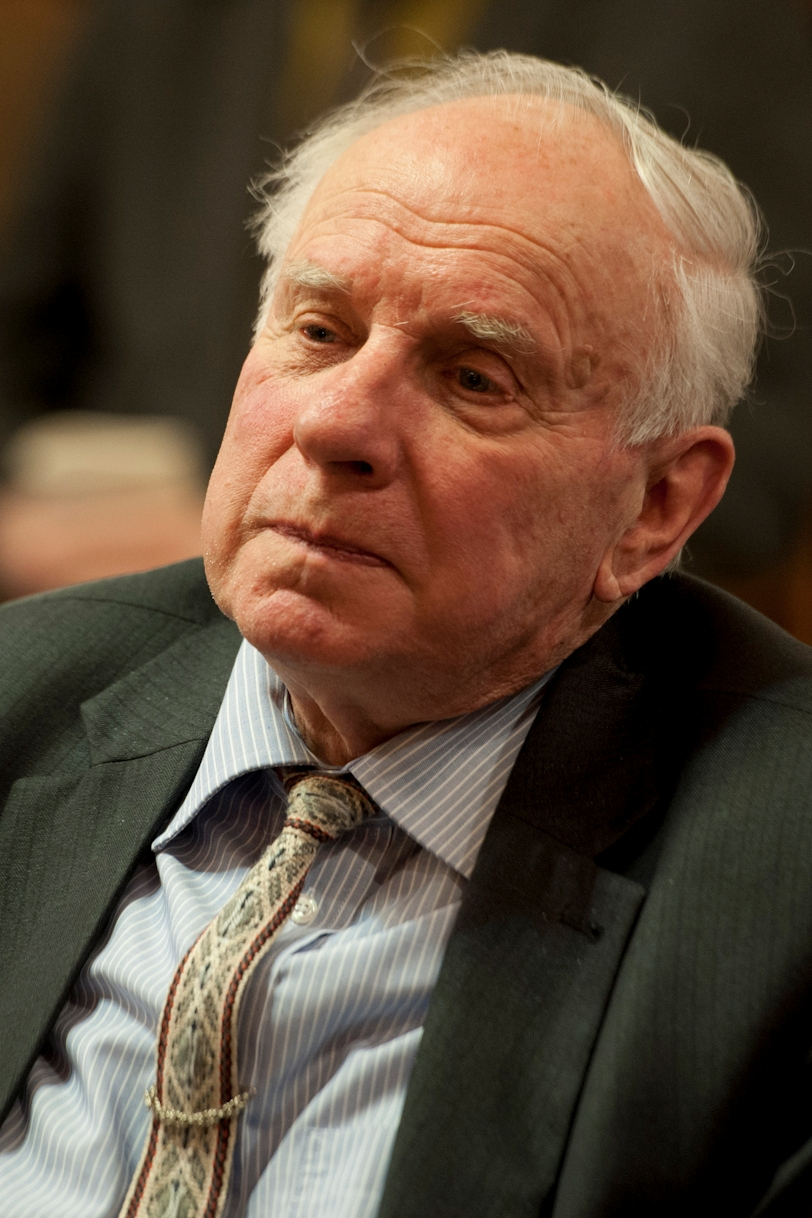
- Cālītis in 2013
- Born: 5 March 1931; Riga, Latvia
- Died: 1 July 2023 (aged 92)
- Occupations: Politician, electrician

Ints Cālītis (5 March 1931 – 1 July 2023) was a Latvian politician and political prisoner.

== Biography ==
Ints Cālītis was first arrested in 1949, when he was 17 years old and still in school, accused of having created an "anti-Soviet underground organization". He was sentenced to 25 years in a camp near Magadan in the far east of Russia. Following the amnesty after Joseph Stalin's death, he was eventually able to return to Latvia in 1956. In 1958 he was arrested for the second time, accused of "writing anti-Soviet letters" and trying to regroup his former underground organization. He was sentenced to six years in the correctional labour camp of Mordovia, from which he returned to Latvia in 1964.

These experiences did not stop him from engaging in dissident activities. In 1977 he collaborated with Viktors Kalniņš and Estonian and Lithuanian dissidents to try to create the "Estonian-Latvian-Lithuanian National Movement Main Committee". In 1979 he signed the Baltic Appeal. In 1981 he signed an open letter asking to turn Northern Europe into a nuclear-free zone.

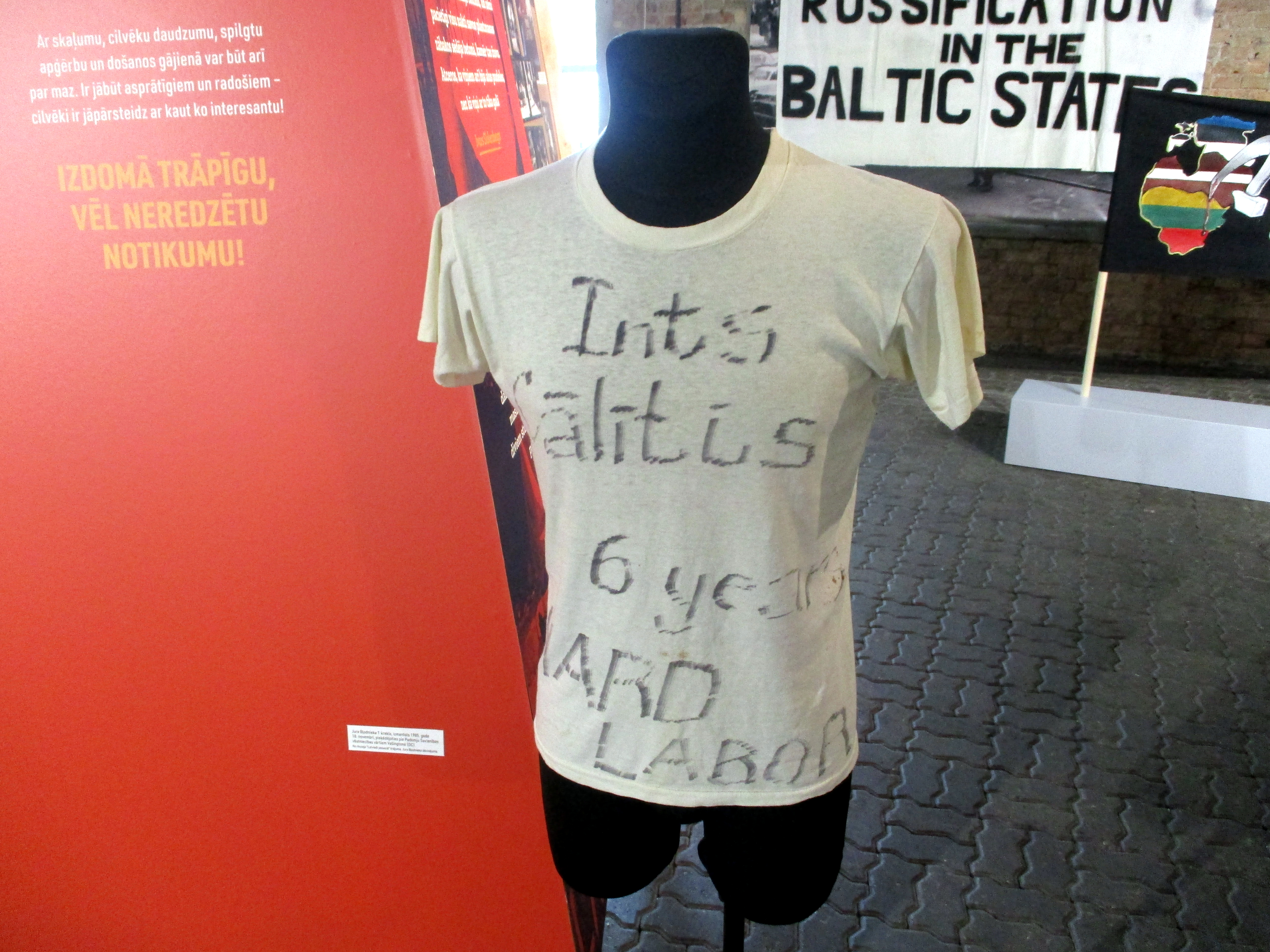
A t-shirt worn by Juris Podnieks on 18 November 1989 while chaining himself to the gate of the Embassy of Soviet Union in Washington in protest at the sentencing of Cālītis to 6 years of hard labour.

Having been warned by the KGB, he was once again arrested in 1983 and sentenced to six years in prison. This arrest was part of a crackdown on Dievturība, Latvia's Baltic neopaganism, which Cālītis was an adherent of. The Soviet authorities viewed the interest in folklore and ancient traditions as a cloak for nationalist and anti-Soviet sympathies, and accused Cālītis of Nazi activities. Cālītis was released from prison in 1986 and became active in the Popular Front of Latvia.

In 1990 he was elected into the Supreme Council of the Republic of Latvia. He was one of the voters in favor of the restoration of Latvia's independence on 4 May 1990.

In 2000 he was awarded the Order of the Three Stars of the third class.

Cālītis died on 1 July 2023, at the age of 92.
