= Jānis Brikmanis =

Latvian zoologist, television presenter

- Born: 25 February 1940
- Died: 18 April 2019 (aged 79)
- Education: Latvian State University
- Occupations: Zoologist, environmental conservationist, radio presenter, television presenter, writer
- Spouse: Vija Brikmane

Jānis Brikmanis (25 February 1940 – 18 April 2019) was a Latvian zoologist, environmental conservationist, radio and television presenter, and writer.

== Career ==
Jānis Brikmanis studied at the department of biology at the Latvian State University from 1960 to 1965. He was the captain of the university's rock-climbing team. After graduation he worked at the chemical plant in Olaine before he got a teaching position at the Daugavpils Pedagogical Institute in 1970. From 1975, he worked for the Gauja National Park as an engineer, zoologist, and senior researcher.

Over a period of 35 years, Brikmanis was a public figure in Latvia as the presenter of several radio and television programs about animal life, in particular about birds. He could imitate the sounds of different birds and gained the nickname Putnu Jānis, meaning "Bird Jānis". He wrote four books about nature.

In 2015, he received the Cross of Recognition from the Latvian state in recognition of his lifelong contribution to environmental protection and promotion.

== Personal life ==
He was married to Vija Brikmane, whom he met in Daugavpils when he was a lecturer and she was a student. The couple had four children. From 1995 to 1998, he was the leader of the Congregation of Latvian Dievturi (Latvian: Latvijas Dievturu Sadraudze), a Baltic neopagan organisation. He died from cancer on 18 April 2019.

== Citations and references ==
=== Cited sources ===
- Lapsa, Lauma; Sergejeva, Santa (28 April 2019). "VAKARA ZIŅAS: Putnu Jāņa sirds apstājas mirušās meitas dzimšanas dienā". Neatkarīgā Rīta Avīze (in Latvian).
- Muktupalevs, Valdis (2005). "Baltic Religion: New Religious Movements". In Jones, Lindsay (ed.). Encyclopedia of Religion, vol 2: Attributes of God – Butler, Joseph. Detroit: Thomson Gale. ISBN 0-02-865997-X.
- Tiļļa, Andris (22 April 2019). "Putnu Jāņa fenomens. Pēdējā intervija ar ornitologu Jāni Brikmani". Latvijas Avīze (in Latvian).
