= Valdemārs Ozoliņš =

Latvian composer and conductor

Valdemārs Ozoliņš (5 November 1896 Vestiena parish – 15 February 1973, Pueblo, Colorado, US) was a Latvian composer and conductor.

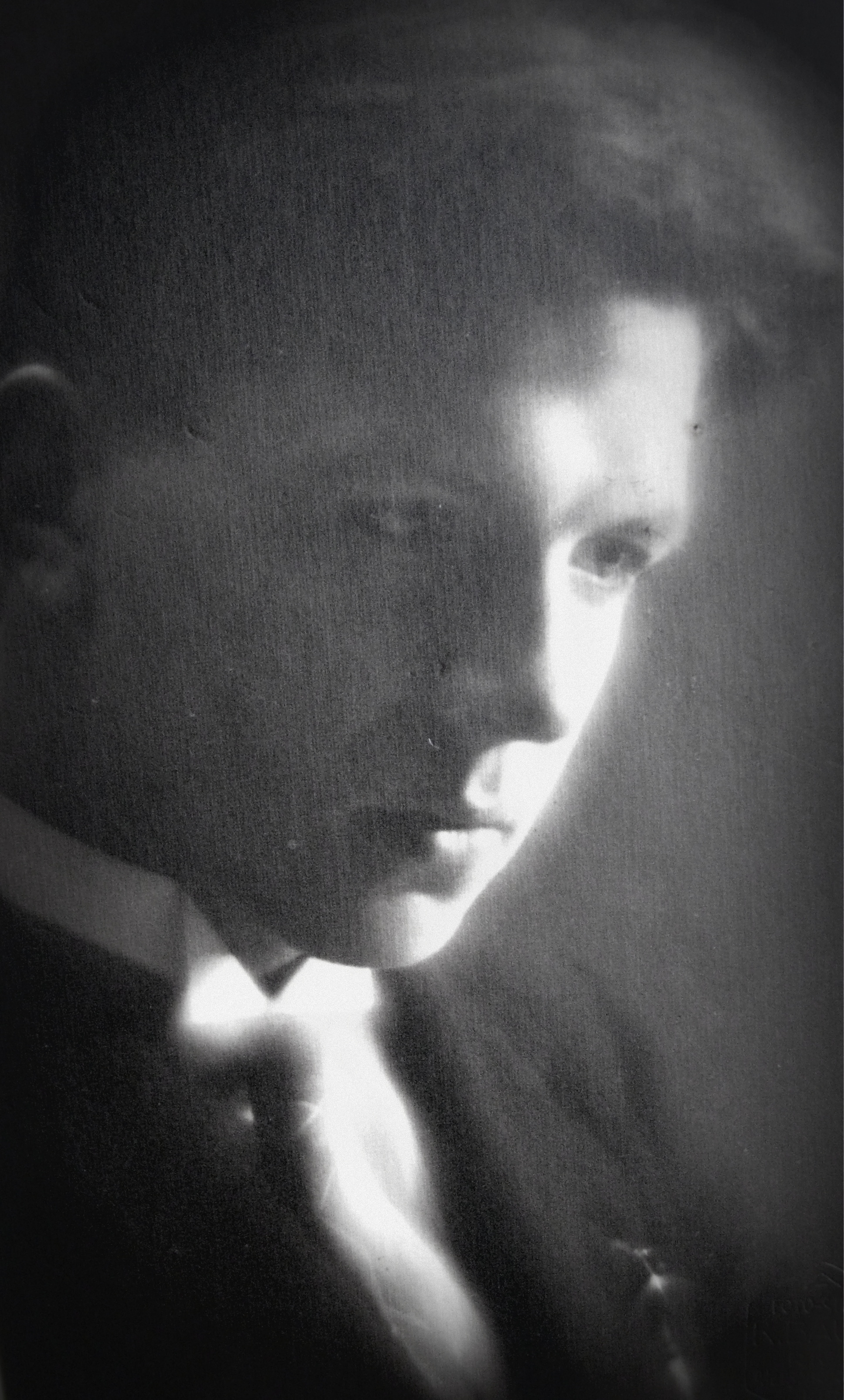
Composer Valdemārs Ozoliņš

Valdemārs Ozoliņš songs have been treasured by choirs ever since his triumphant debut during the VI Latvian Song Festival in Riga, Latvia in 1926. The author of about 500 songs and several cantatas, Valdemārs Ozoliņš was chief conductor at several Latvian Song Festivals.

== Biography ==
Valdemārs Ozoliņš was born November 5, 1896, in Vestiena, in the Governorate of Livonia (present-day Latvia). His parents were farmers. He attended school in Vestiena, enrolled the conservatory of St Petersburg 1914, later in Moscow, and in 1921 the composition and conducting classes of the conservatory in Riga, Latvia, which he graduated in 1931. In Riga he was the substitute of the conductor Teodors Reiters. Valdemārs Ozoliņš song “Papardes zieds” – "The fern flower" (text by K. Krūza) was received very well at the VI Latvian Song Festival in Riga in 1926. He obtained the master's degree in music from the Chicago conservatory, US. Valdemārs Ozoliņš was honoured by the Latvian Culture fund for his solo and choir songs in 1926. He had some involvement with the Baltic neopagan movement Dievturība, where he was the first conductor of the dievturi choir.

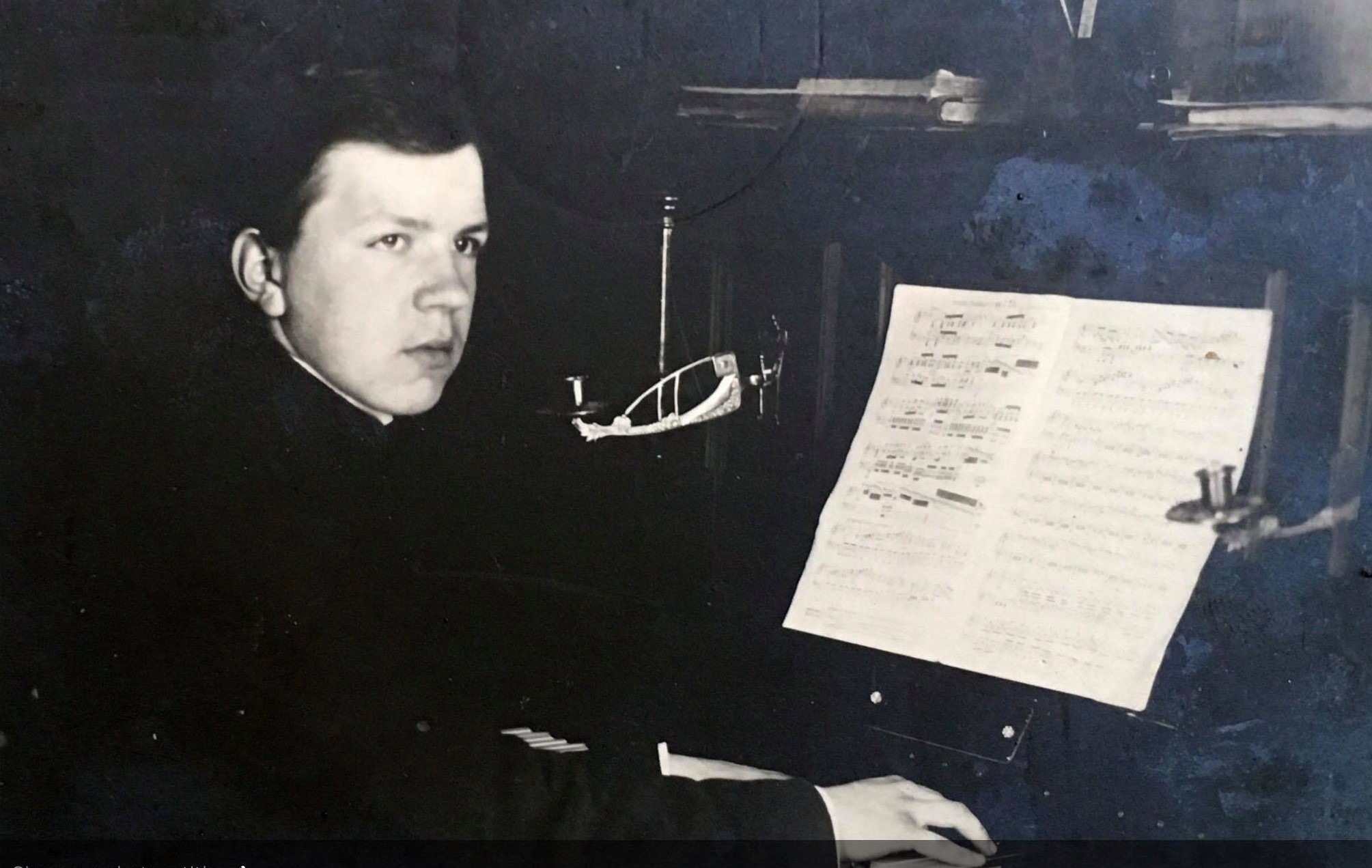
Valdemārs Ozoliņš at the piano in his youth

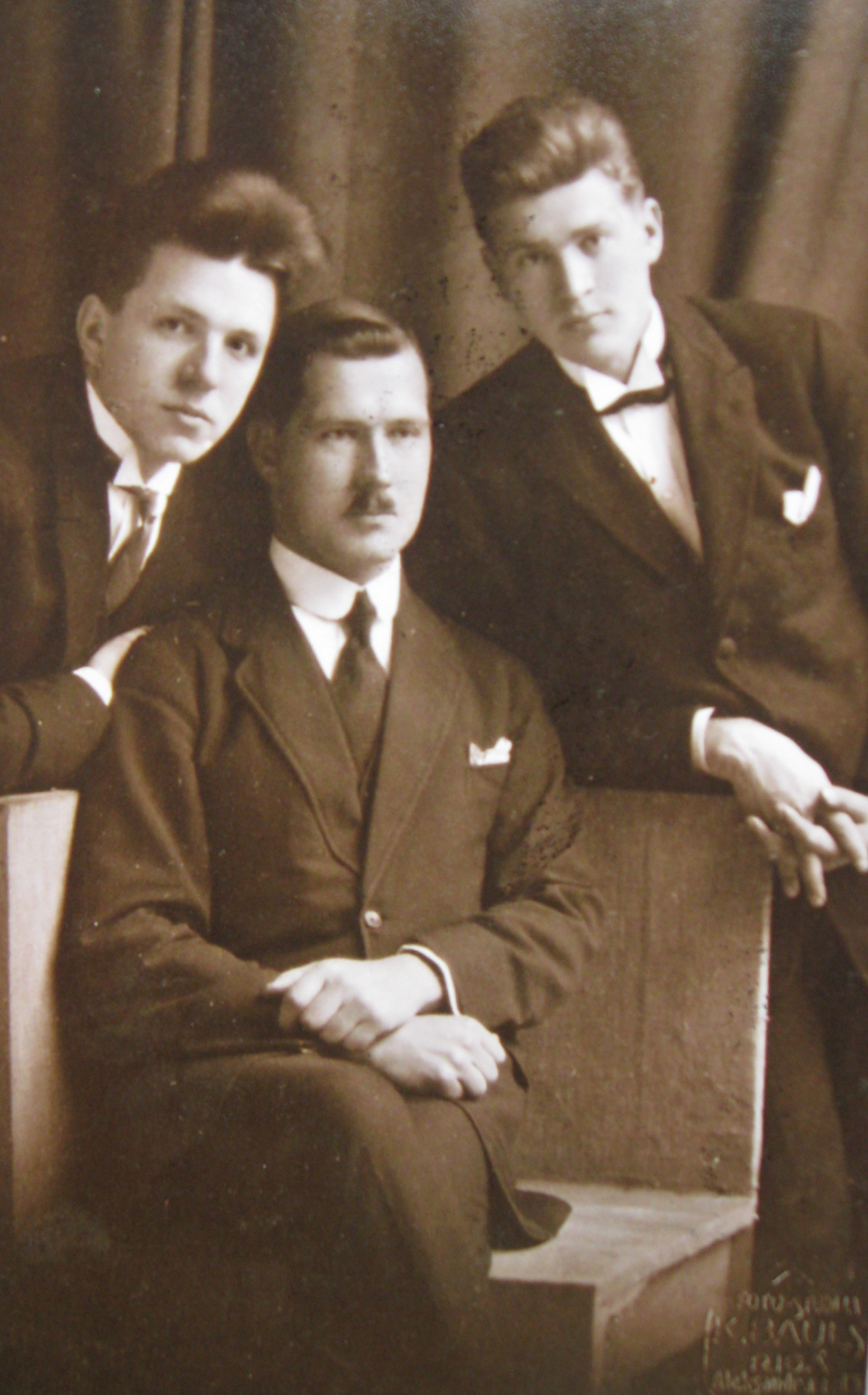
Composer Valdemārs Ozoliņš (from the left) together with brothers Aleksandrs Ozoliņš (in the middle) and Jānis Ozoliņš

He died in exile on February 15, 1973, in Pueblo, Colorado, US. The urns of Valdemārs Ozoliņš and his wife Valija, née Alberts, were buried in Forest Cemetery, Riga, Latvia, on August 20, 1993, next to his teacher, professor Jāzeps Vītols.

To commemorate the 130th anniversary of Valdemārs Ozoliņš, his relative, composer Eduards Ozoliņš, published a new instrumental arrangement of Ozoliņš’s song “Latvija daiļa” in 2026. A digital exhibition was also launched to commemorate Ozoliņš’s life and musical career, as well as to explore the roots of the Ozoliņš family in Vestiena Parish.

== Bibliography ==
- Valentīns Bērzkalns. Latviešu Dziesmu svētku vēsture – 1864–1940. Brooklyn, New York: Grāmatu Draugs, 1965.
- Valentīns Bērzkalns. Latviešu Dziesmu svētki trimdā – 1946–1965. Brooklyn, New York: Grāmatu Draugs, 1968.
- Latvju Enciklopēdija. Stockholm, Sweden: Trīs Zvaigznes, 1952–1953, vol. 2, p. 1818.
- Latvju Enciklopēdija 1962–1982. Lincoln, Nebraska: ALA Latviešu institūts, 1987, vol. 3, p. 322.
- Blanka-Alberta, Ē. Kur palicis Ozoliņš? Zviedrijas latviešu pensionāru biedrības biļetens ‘Sveiciens’ 1982, vol. 43, p. 21.
- Gleške, L. Atceroties mūsu kultūras darbiniekus. Komponista Valdemāra Ozoliņa atdusas vieta Rīgas I Meža kapos. Brooklyn, New York: Laiks, 1995, 27 (4653), 3.
- Rūķe-Draviņa, V. Dzeja un mūzika. Raiņa un Aspazijas gada grāmata. Stockholm, Sweden: RAF, 1969, pp. 95–100.
- Slaucītājs, L. Zinātnes darbā – draugos ar mākslu, Lincoln, Nebraska: Vaidava 1969, p. 145.
- Unāms, Ž. Es viņu pazīstu. Latviešu biogrāfiskā vārdnīca. Riga: Rota, 1938 & Grand Haven, Michigan: 1975, p. 368.

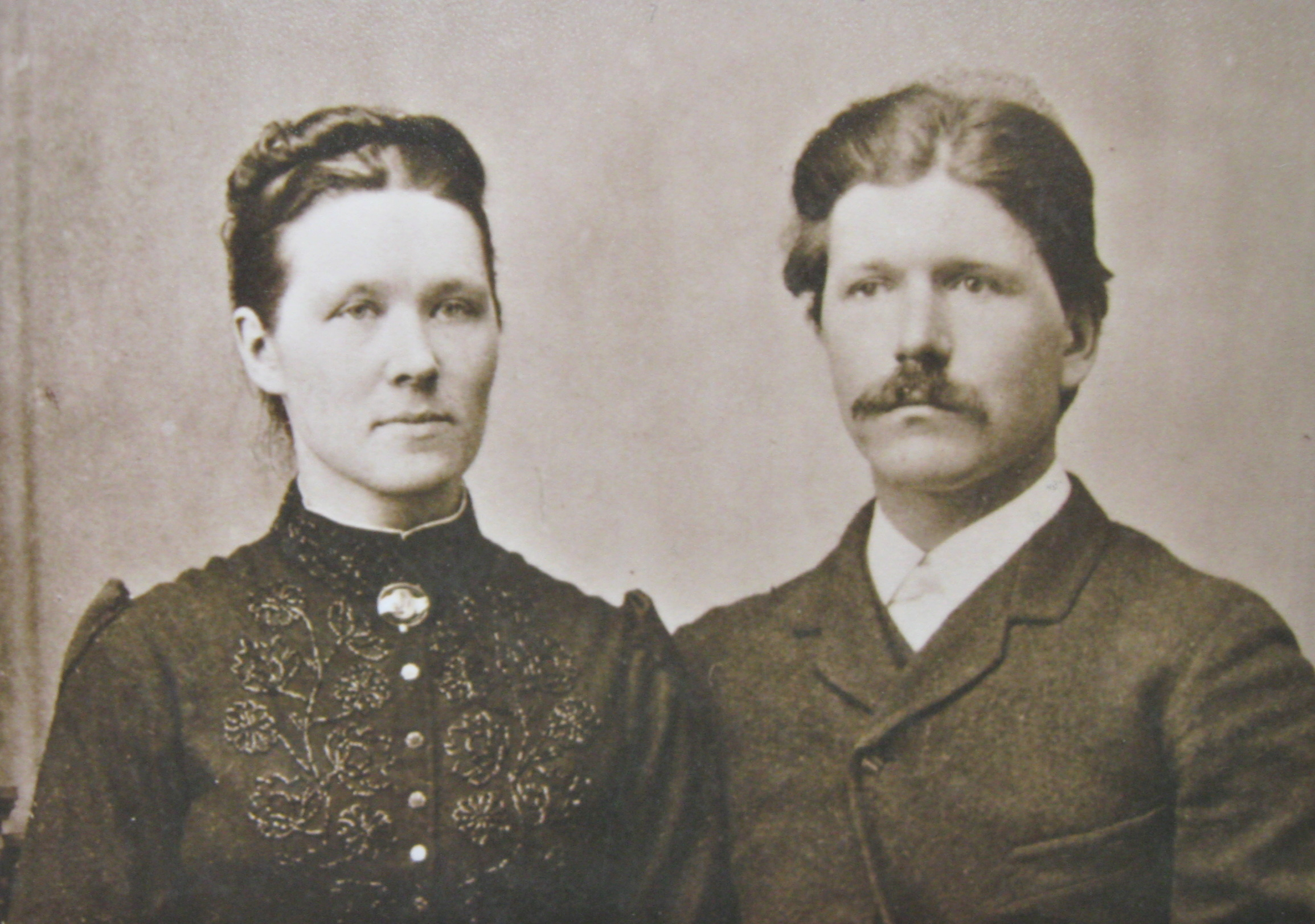
Composer's parents Jānis Ozoliņš and Ieva Ozoliņa, lived in Vestiena.
