= Lokstene Shrine of Dievturi =

Modern Pagan religious building

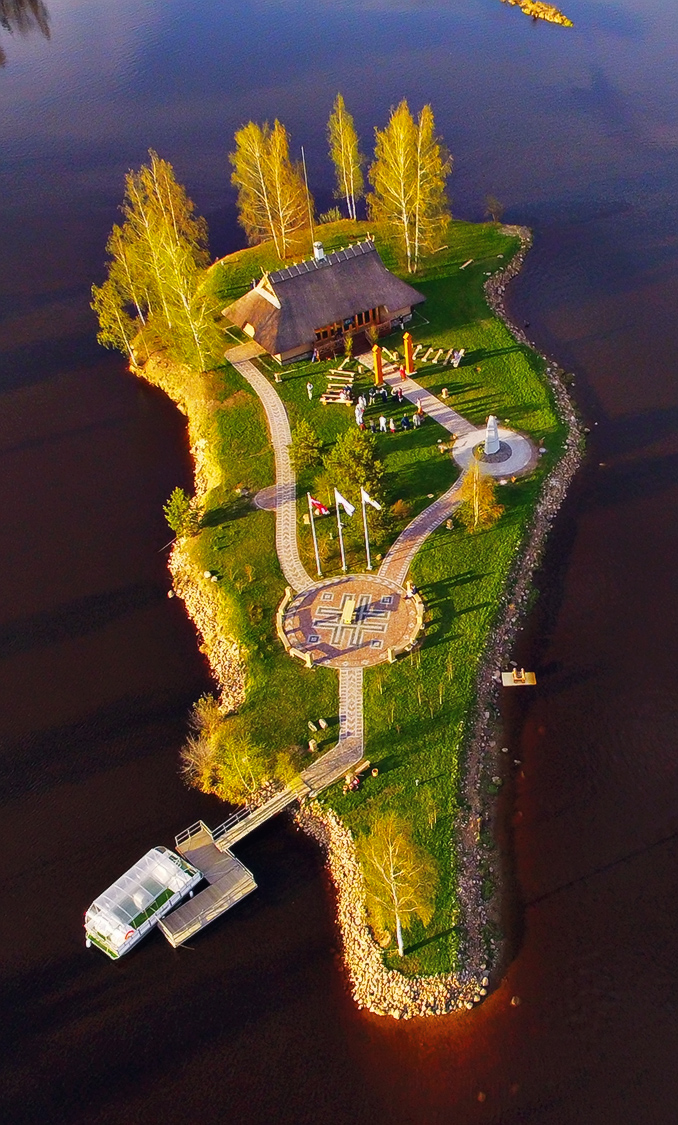
- Aerial view of Lokstene Shrine of Dievturi
- Interactive map of the Lokstene Shrine of Dievturi area

General information
- Location: Liepsalas, Klintaine Parish
- Coordinates: 56°35′58″N 25°39′27″E
- Opened: 6 May 2017
- Owner: Dagnis Čākurs
- Management: Latvijas Dievturu sadraudze

Design and construction
- Architect: Ainārs Markvarts

Lokstene Shrine of Dievturi (Latvian: Lokstenes dievturu svētnīca) is a Dievturi religious building in Aizkraukle Municipality, in the Vidzeme region of Latvia. It was inaugurated in 2017 and is used by the organization Latvijas Dievturu sadraudze for devotional ceremonies and annual celebrations.

== History ==
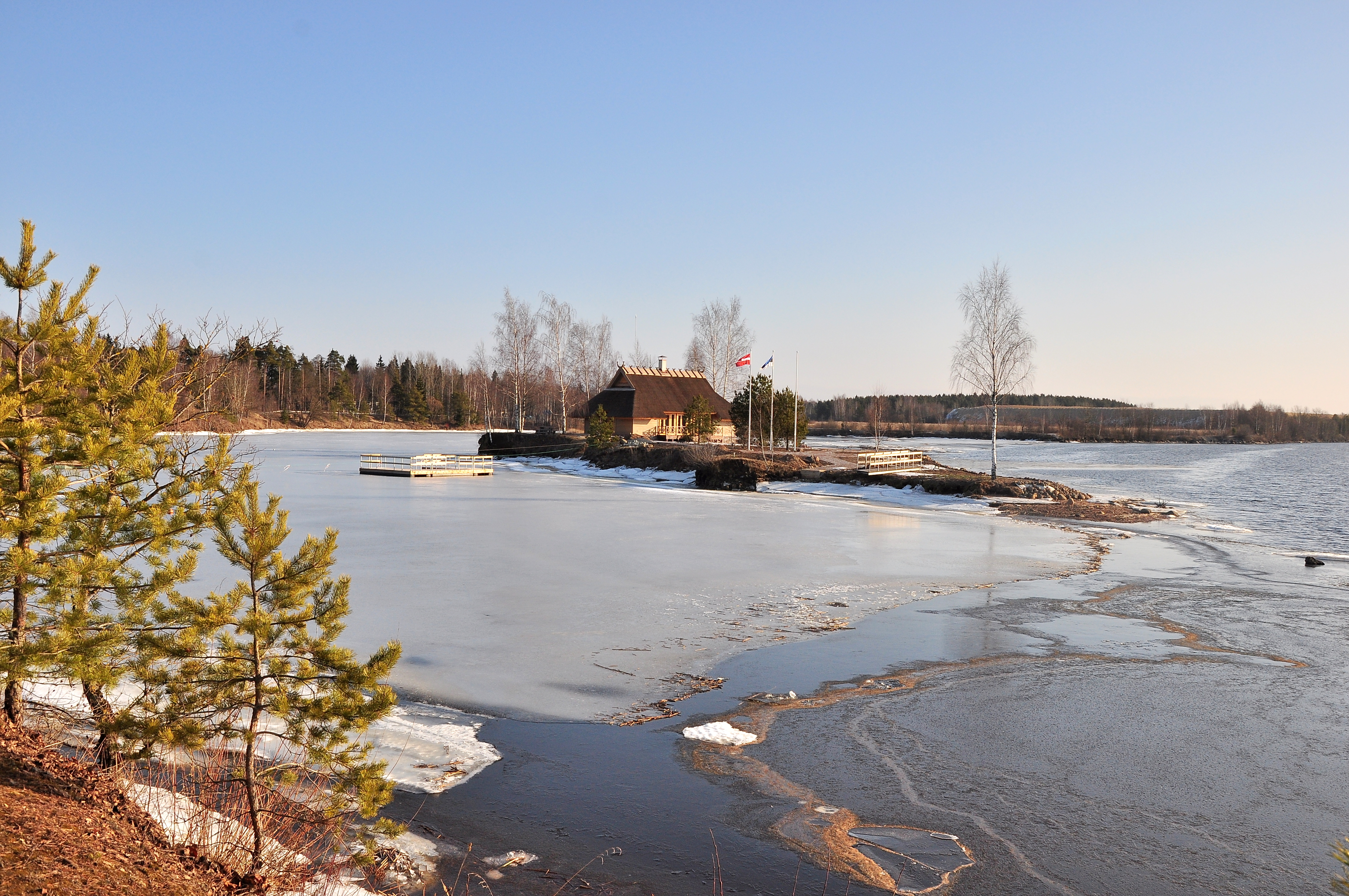
The shrine under construction on 6 March 2016

The project to build a modern shrine for Baltic paganism was initiated and financed by Dagnis Čākurs, owner of the Liepkalni bakery chain. Čākurs explained that as he had grown older, he had become more interested in questions about the soul and mortality. As the Latvian people had supported his business over the years, he wanted to give something in return, and hoped to do so with a house for the national gods and Latvian folk culture. He attributed his interest in Latvian paganism to Valdis Celms, an artist, author and leading member of the Baltic neopagan organization Latvijas Dievturu sadraudze (LDS).

The Lokstene Shrine was constructed on an island owned by Čākurs and is named after the nearby Lokstene castle mound. It is leased by LDS, which began to use the building in the autumn of 2016, before the entire complex was finished. The official opening took place on 6 May 2017. Since then, it has hosted regular devotional ceremonies and celebrations, such as family celebrations, celebrations of moral and spiritual values, and celebration of the Latvian national day.

Anita Liepiņa of the literary magazine Jaunā Gaita argued in 2017 that the building deserves to receive state support just like Christian churches receive support for maintenance.

== Architecture and design ==
The Lokstene Shrine is located on a small island in the Daugava river, behind the Liepkalni bakery and café in Liepsalas, close to the town Pļaviņas. The entire complex includes a shrine building, a ferry, an assembly and flag square, a monument to the ancestors, and a gate of the sun.

The design was developed by LDS under the leadership of Celms. The architect was Ainārs Markvarts. The interior design was created by Andrejs Broks and Egons Garklāvs. The sculptor was Jānis Karlovs.

== See also ==
- List of modern pagan temples
- Romuva (temple)
