= Stukmaņi Manor =

Manor house in Latvia

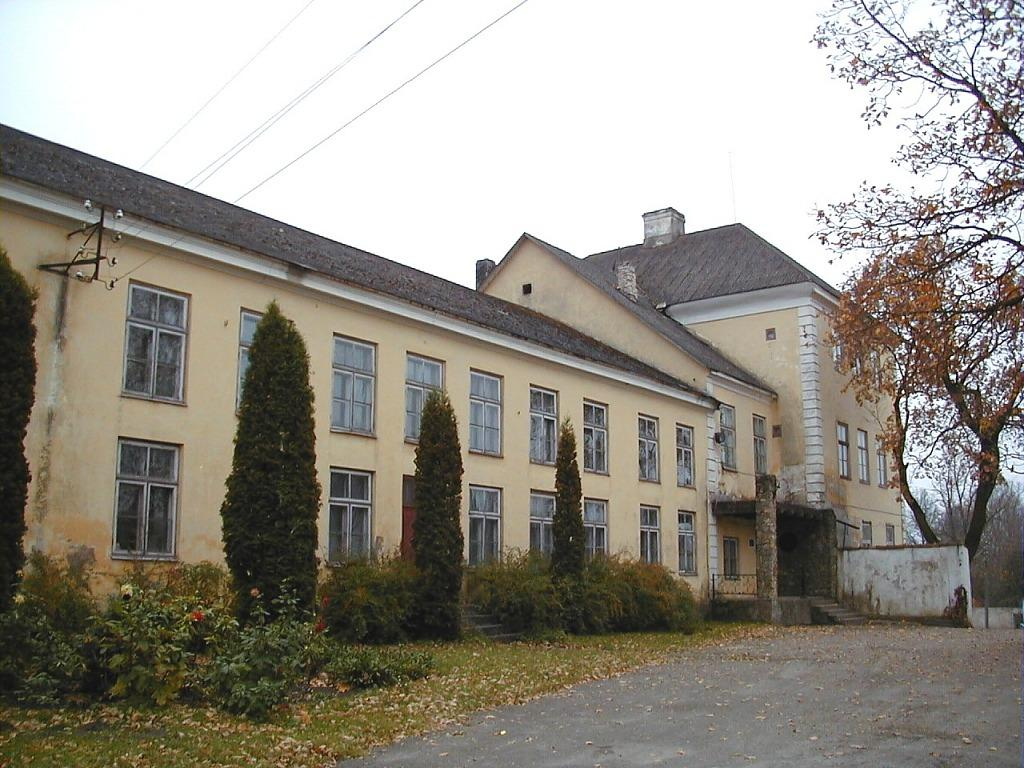

- Location within Latvia

General information
- Status: Damaged during World War I and never restored. Rebuilt as a community center.
- Location: Klintaine Parish, Aizkraukle Municipality, Vidzeme, Latvia
- Coordinates: 56°35′54″N 25°38′25″E
- Completed: middle of 18th century

Stukmaņi Manor (Latvian: Stukmaņu muiža) is a manor house in Klintaine Parish, Aizkraukle Municipality in the Vidzeme region of Latvia.

== History ==
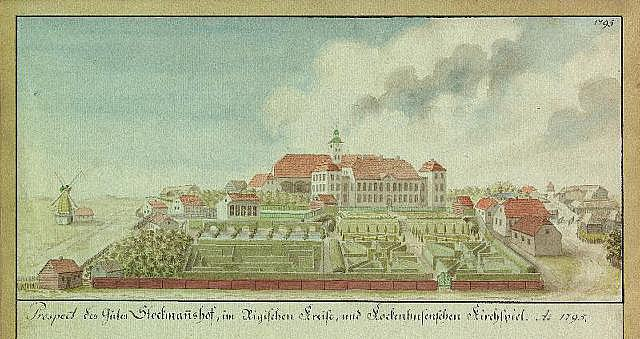
Stukmaņi manor in 1795

Stukmaņi manor was built in the 16th century. Only remain of early buildings can be found throughout manor property. Archaeological excavations in the flooded Lokstene castle mound, which is located about a kilometer from the center of the current manor, provide information about the surroundings of Stukmaņi manor. 15th century Archbishop of Riga Henning Scharpenberg granted the village of Loksten and Stukmanis to Johann Loksten and his adopted son Arend Stokman. In 1598 the owner of the manor was Georgs Stokmanis. In 1601 manor belonged to K. Schroeder. In 1652, Christina, Queen of Sweden, approved the manor as a family property for H. Kronstern.

The Great Northern War and the ensuing plague caused great damage to the region. After several changes of ownership, the manor belonged to the von Löwenstern family from 1780. Since 1878 manor was ruled by Count Theodore von Medem, the fourth son of Christoph Johann von Medem, and later by his heirs.

There are several buildings in manor center. The oldest manor house Sikadeliwas built in the 17th century This architectural monument is in ruins and is included in the material prepared by the State Inspection for the Protection of Cultural Monuments 100 most endangered cultural and culturally significant objects in Latvia. It is believed that the building was not intended for living, but for economic purposes.

Later in 18th century large free-standing manor palaces were built without any significance for defense. At this time Mr. von Lēvenšterns, the owner of Stukmaņi manor, began to build a new opulent palace in Baroque style, near the north bank of the Daugava River. However the fate of this great palace was not favorable. It suffered several fires during World War I and lost its original appearance when it was rebuilt as a community center. In 1943, after the second big fire, a new one was built in the old place which is still standing today.

== See also ==
- List of palaces and manor houses in Latvia
