= Samogitian Sanctuary =

Lithuanian pagan sanctuary

Coordinates: 56°02′28″N 21°04′28″E

Samogitian Sanctuary (Samogitian: Žemaitiu Alks, Lithuanian: Žemaičių Alkas) is a pagan sanctuary in Šventoji, Lithuania, a reconstruction of a medieval pagan observatory. The poles corresponding to the gods and goddesses of the Balts can be used to observe the main calendar holidays.

It is based on archeological records of the paleoastronomic observatory and pagan shrine that existed on Birutė Hill in Palanga until the 16th century. The wooden poles were carved by Lithuanian folk artists and were installed in June 1998. Neopagans use the sanctuary for devotional ceremonies during the major holidays.

== See also ==
- Birutė
- List of modern pagan temples
- Romuva (religion)
