= Arvīds Brastiņš =

Latvian sculptor, writer and neopagan leader

Arvīds Brastiņš (13 April 1893 – 15 November 1984) was a Latvian sculptor, writer and neopagan leader. He was educated at the Saint Petersburg Stieglitz State Academy of Art and Design and began to exhibit his folklore-inspired sculptures in 1918. He worked as a schoolteacher and was active as a writer, writing about Latvian folklore and publishing collections of folksongs. Brastiņš was the brother of Ernests Brastiņš who founded the Baltic neopagan movement Dievturība in the 1920s. Both brothers became major intellectual leaders within this movement. Resettled in the United States after the Soviet occupation of Latvia, Arvīds Brastiņš led an émigré continuation of the movement until his death.

== Early life and work ==
Arvīds Brastiņš was born in Bīriņu pagasts (now Limbaži Municipality) in Kreis Riga, Governorate of Livonia on 13 April 1893 as the son of the blacksmith Augusts Brastiņš. The family moved to Riga when he was seven years old and later to the village Dikli. He was educated at the Saint Petersburg Stieglitz State Academy of Art and Design from 1913 to 1918. He worked as a schoolteacher and studied architecture at the University of Latvia.

As a sculptor, Brastiņš focused on woodcarving in small format and drew most of his inspiration from Latvian folklore. He held his first exhibition in 1918. He wrote about Latvian mythology, folk traditions and calendar holidays and compiled Latvian folksongs which he published in several anthologies. Active as a dramatist, he adapted folk tales into school plays for which he sometimes worked as director, set decorator and painter.

In the 1920s, Brastiņš joined his brother Ernests Brastiņš in the creation of the Baltic neopagan movement Dievturība. The two founded an organization in 1927, Latvijas Dievtur̦u Sadraudze (lit. 'Congregation of Latvian Dievturi'), and Arvīds became the editor of its magazine Labietis, published from 1931 to 1940. Together with his brother and the literature historian Alfrēds Goba, he was one of the main intellectual leaders of the movement in the interwar period. He created a carved stone which was used in the movement's marriage rituals in 1939–1940. The movement was suppressed by the Soviet occupation in 1940 and its leadership was scattered; Ernests Brastiņš was executed in 1942 and Arvīds Brastiņš emigrated to Germany in 1944.

== Émigré activities ==
Brastiņš established a post-war Dievturība movement for Latvian émigrés in 1947 and led it until his death, holding the title of Dižvadonis (lit. 'Grand Leader'). From 1950 he lived in the United States where he worked as a schoolteacher. In 1955, the émigré movement relaunched Labietis with Brastiņš as editor. In 1971, his group was formally registered as the Latvian Church Dievturi, based in Illinois. The émigré movement has not been exclusively religious, but worked to retain Latvian culture among the emigrant population in general, and contributed to an increased interest in Latvian customs and language abroad. Brastiņš continued to publish folksongs and analyses of Baltic deities, notably in the books Māte Māra (lit. 'Mother Māra', 1967) and Saules teiksma (lit. 'Saule's Sayings', 1977).

== Personal life and legacy ==
Brastiņš was married to Milda Brastiņa and had a son and a daughter. He died in the United States on 15 November 1984. His daughter Māra Grīna (1927–2017) and her husband Marģers Grīns (1928–2019) carried on his work with the publication of Labietis, their own books about Latvian folklore and in the case of Grīns as the 1990–1995 leader of the exile Dievturi church.

In 2018, Brastiņš' personal archive was gifted by his descendants to the Institute of Literature, Folklore and Art of the University of Latvia and shipped from America to Riga. The archive contains research, publications, correspondence and other material related to the works of the Brastiņš brothers, the exile Dievturība movement and the cultural and educational activities of Latvian émigrés in the United States and Canada.

The stone Brastiņš created for Dievturi weddings was lost during the Soviet invasion. The relaunched Dievturība movement in post-Soviet Latvia regards it as a lost relic. The 40 by 40 by 16 centimetres (15.7 in × 15.7 in × 6.3 in) stone features a Māra cross and is depicted in issue 3 of Labietis from 1939.

== See also ==
- Latvian Americans
