= Dievturība =

Latvian neopagan movement

- Founder: Ernests Brastiņš; Kārlis Bregžis
- Origin: 1925
- Members: 600–800 (2018)

Dievturība is a contemporary continuation of the ethnic religion of the Latvians from what it was before Christianization in the 13th century. Adherents call themselves Dievturi (singular: Dievturis), literally "Dievs' keepers", "people who live in harmony with Dievs". Dievturība is mainly rooted in Latvian folklore, folk songs and Latvian mythology.

Dievturība was systematized in 1925 by Ernests Brastiņš and Kārlis Bregžis. It was forcibly suppressed by Soviets in 1940, but lived on in émigré communities and was re-registered in Latvia in 1990. In 2016, a social media survey found that 20% of Latvians identified their religious affiliation as "Latvian religion". Of those 20%, 81% declared themselves "dievturis", 1% "Dievs, Laima, Māra – folk religion", 9% "latviskā dzīvesziņa ('Latvian worldview')", 6% "a Latvian", 2% "Latvian ancient belief", 1% "officially Lutheran but heart-wise Dievturis".

Dievturība primarily exists in Latvia but there are also congregations of adherents in the United States, including the Dievsēta, a property in rural Wisconsin where Dievturi holidays and celebrations take place.

== History ==
=== The era of Ernests Brastiņš ===
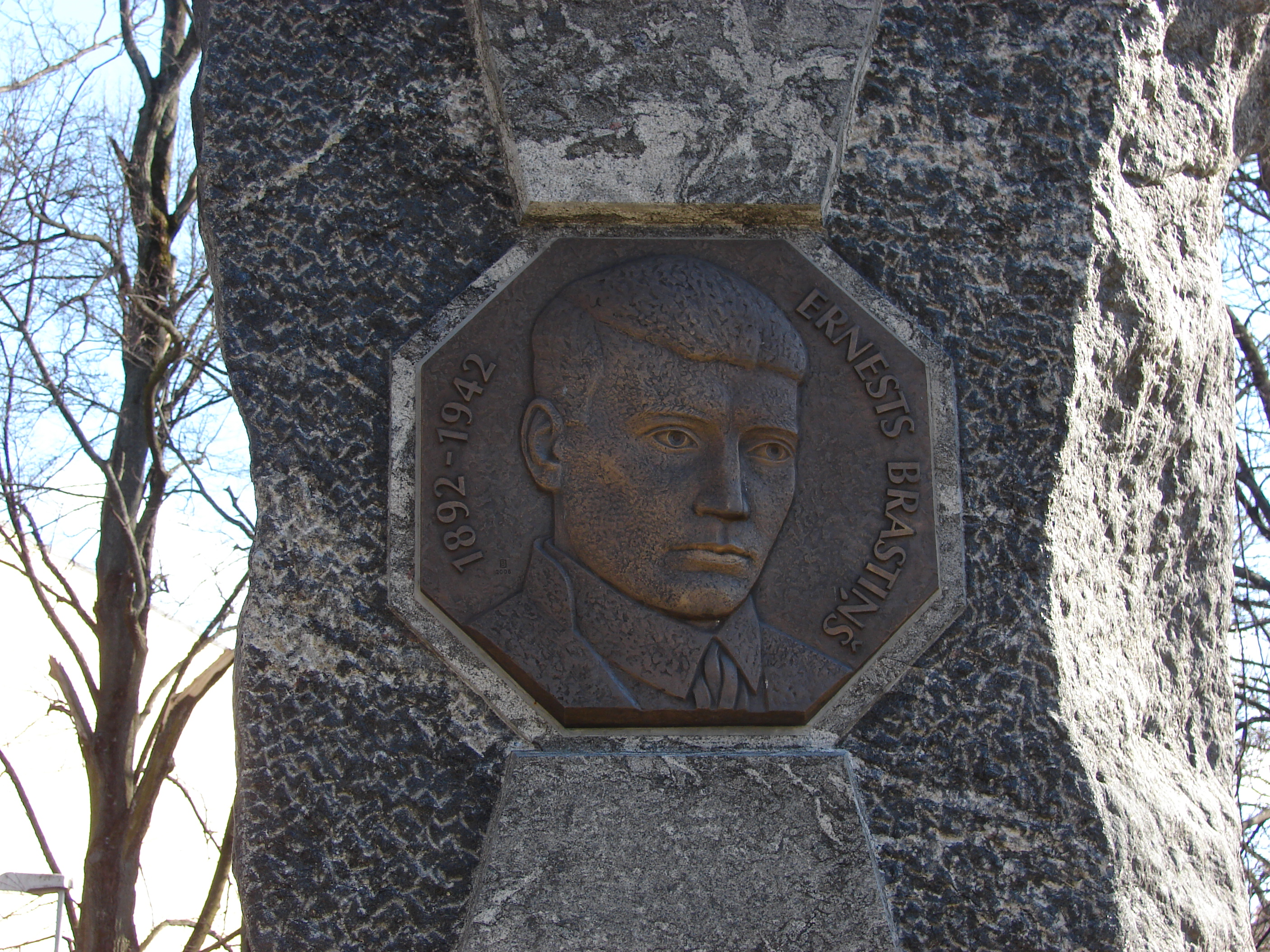
Portrait of Ernests Brastiņš in Kronvald's Park, Riga

Dievturība's cultural inheritance can be traced to the New Latvians (Latvian: jaunlatvieši) movement, which began to collect folklore during the First Latvian National Awakening in the 19th century, and fought for Latvian independence during World War I. The Dievturība movement was initiated in 1925 when Ernests Brastiņš and Kārlis Bregžis published a manifesto, Latviešu dievturības atjaunojums (lit. 'The Renewal of Latvian Dievturība'). In 1926 they founded the organisation Latvju dievtur̦u draudze (lit. 'Kindred of Latvian Dievturi'). The two had different ideas about the movement: Bregžis favoured an intimate practice, limited to the family or a small community, whereas Brastiņš was in favour of political involvement, wanted to attract large numbers of people, was an effective organiser and public speaker and was not shy about making categorical statements. Bregžis had signed the registration document for the original organisation, and Brastiņš registered his own parallel organisation already in 1927. After 1929, Dievturība largely became associated with Brastiņš' name.

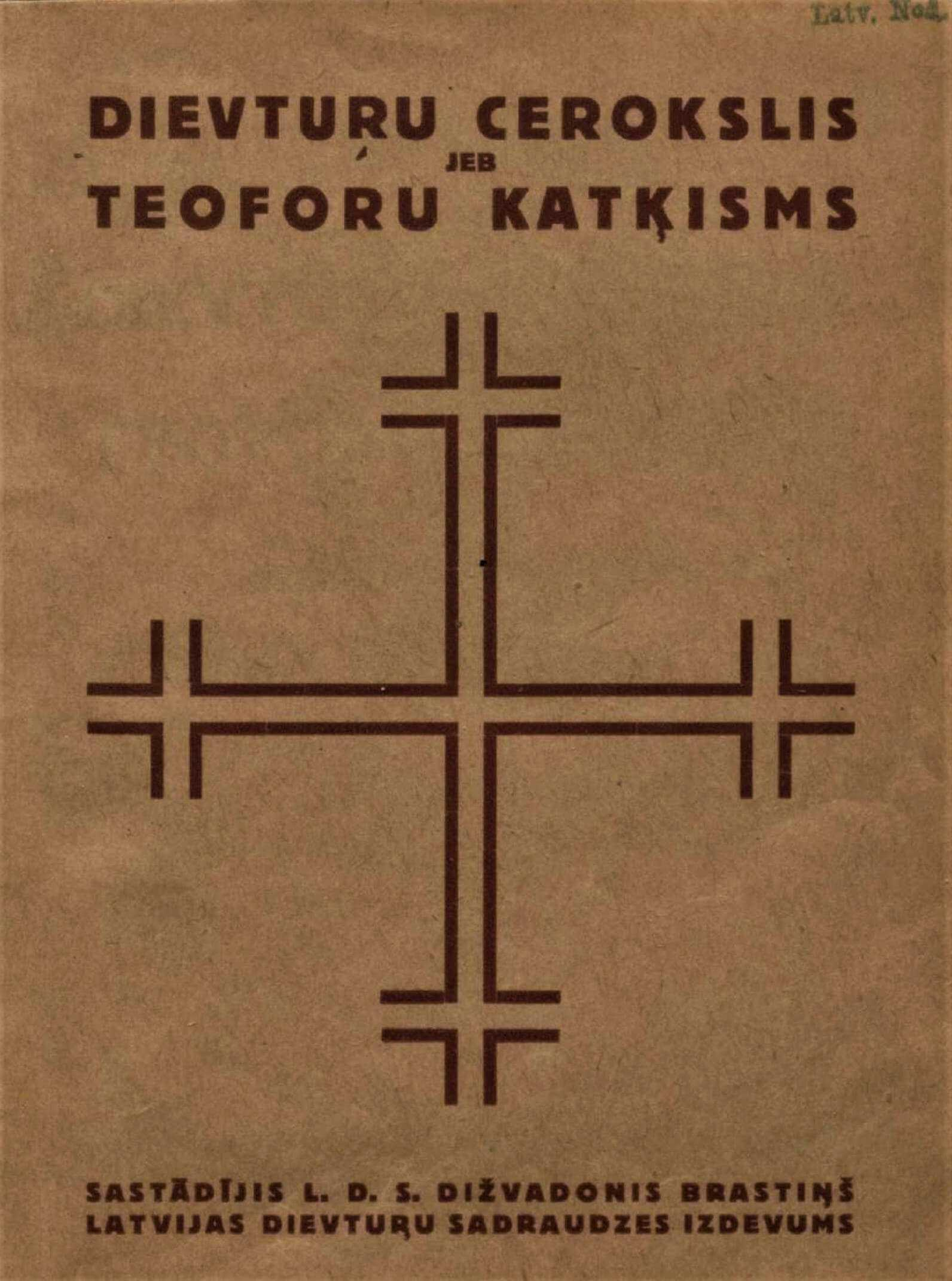
Dievtur̦u cerokslis (1932) was the main inspirational text of Dievturība during the interwar period.

Bregžis' organisation ceased to exist in the early 1930s, but Brastiņš' Latvijas Dievturu sadraudze continued to operate, even when it was forced to re-register as a secular organisation in 1935. Brastiņš (1892–1942) thus became the primary force in the early development of Dievturība. He was an artist, an amateur historian, a folklorist and an archaeologist. He documented many ancient Latvian structures and wrote the Index of Mythological Notions of Latvian Dainas. His Dievtur̦u cerokslis (lit. 'Dievturi Catechism', 1932) became the main inspirational text of Dievturība. Other important ideological leaders in the interwar period were Arvīds Brastiņš, a sculptor and brother of Ernests, and Alfrēds Goba, a literature historian and critic.

In the 1920s and 1930s, the movement attracted several public figures from the cultural sphere, such as the painter Jēkabs Bīne, the writers Voldemārs Dambergs, Viktors Eglītis and Juris Kosa, and the composers Jānis Norvilis and Artūrs Salaks. It failed to attain any widespread popular following, but through the presence of artists and intellectuals, it managed to produce a substantial amount of material on the interpretation of folklore. From 1933 to 1940, the Latvijas Dievturu sadraudze published the magazine Labietis ("The nobleman"). Norvilis, Salaks and the composer and conductor Valdemārs Ozoliņš established a small music scene, focused on kokles, trīdeksnis and choral music. They arranged folk songs for celebrations and composed original music inspired by the movement's principles.

=== Suppression and émigré activities ===
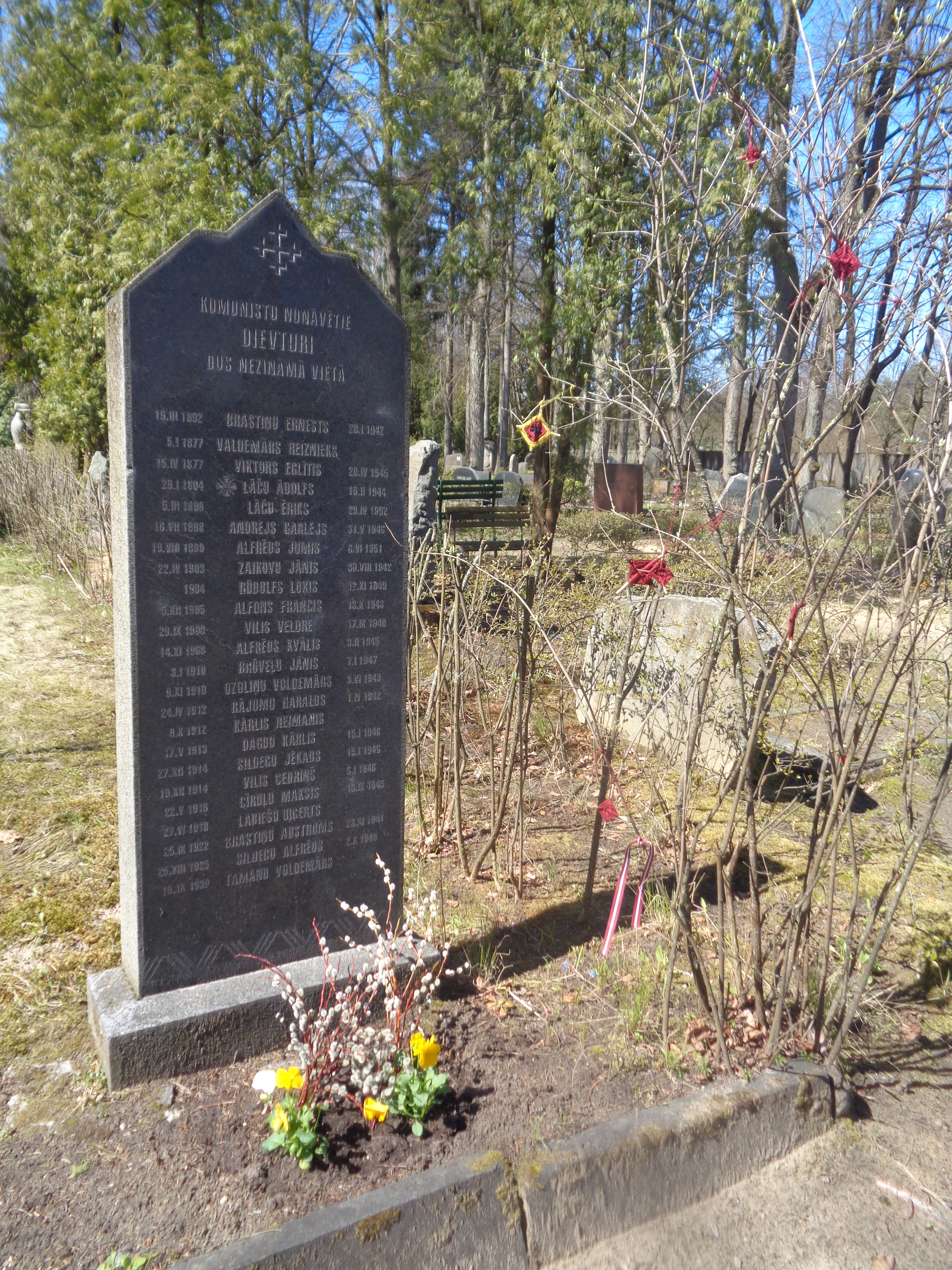
Memorial stone at the Forest Cemetery of Riga to those Latvian Dievturi killed by the Communists 1942–1952.

With the Soviet occupation of Latvia in 1940, the movement was suppressed and scattered. Ernests Brastiņš was deported to a Soviet labour camp in 1941 and executed in 1942, and other leaders were deported to Siberia or emigrated to the West.

During the Soviet era, the movement primarily lived on in small groups within the Latvian émigré communities. In addition to some early activity in Germany and Sweden, the most defining Dievturi activity during this period took place in the United States, where Arvīds Brastiņš in 1947 established himself as the movement's Grand Leader (dižvadonis), a position he held until his death in 1984. The journal Labietis was relaunched in 1955 in Lincoln, Nebraska, the movement was incorporated in 1971 as the Latvian Church Dievturi based in Illinois, and a church complex, named Dievsēta (lit. 'Homestead of Dievs'), was built in Wisconsin beginning in 1977. The exile movement was not always explicitly religious and worked more generally to sustain and promote Latvian culture among the emigrant communities. After Arvīds Brastiņš, the exile church was led by Jānis Palieps (1985–1990), Marģers Grīns (1990–1995), Juris Kᶅaviņš (1995–2000) and Palieps again (2000–?).

In the Latvian Soviet Socialist Republic, some outer signs and symbols from the movement continued to appear at weddings and funerals of people associated with or interested in the movement. In 1983, there were reports of a Soviet crackdown on Dievturība, as there were people in the Latvian dissident milieu who were interested in the religion, such as the activist Ints Cālītis and the poet Gunārs Freimanis. The approach of the Soviet authorities was to accuse those associated with Dievturība of Nazi activities.

=== Revival ===
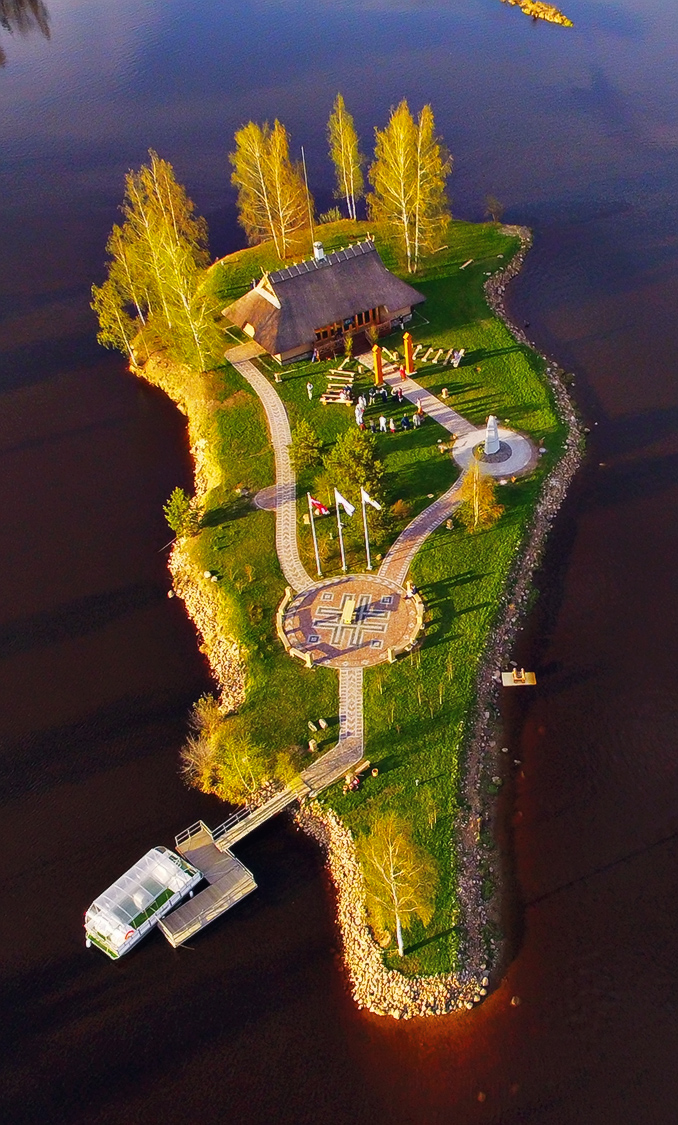
Aerial view of the Lokstene Shrine of Dievturi in Latvia

Works to revive the movement in Latvia began in 1986 as part of an emerging new interest in Latvian history and folklore. The main driving force at this stage was the ceramist Eduards Detlavs (1919–1992). Dievturība was officially re-registered as a religious organization on 18 April 1990, under the name Latvijas Dievturu sadraudze (abbreviated LDS). After Detlavs' death in 1992, the LDS was led by Marģers Grīns from the exile Dievturi church until 1995, then by Jānis Brikmanis until 1998, and after that by Romāns Pussars.

In the 1990s, Dievturība in Latvia became strongly influenced by returning members of the émigré movement. These generally favoured a strict adherence to the writings of Ernests Brastiņš, which sometimes was in conflict with the interests of younger neopagans, and some of the people who had been interested in the movement in the 1980s left. The movement was nevertheless able to renew its activities and become a part of the European cultural neopagan current. At the beginning of the 2000s, there were 16 active groups in Latvia. Most of them were gathered under the LDS but some were independent. Among the points of disagreement within the movement are to what extent the material from the interwar era should be followed, and what the relationship should be between Dievturība and Christianity, with some adherents arguing that the two can be combined.

The Svēte Shrine as the main sacred site in Southern Latvia since 2001 holds Dievturi rituals in Jelgava. The Lokstene Shrine of Dievturi was inaugurated on May 6, 2017 and is operated by the LDS. It was financed by the entrepreneur Dagnis Čākurs and is located on a small island in the Daugava river, close to the town Pļaviņas.

As of 2018, the LDS consisted of a board and eight local groups. The total number of organized Dievturi was approximated to between 600 and 800 people. The Grand Leader of the LDS was Andrejs Broks. The honorary chairman and president of the council was the artist Valdis Celms, who also has had an impact on Baltic spiritual communities with his books Latvju raksts un zīmes (lit. 'Latvian Patterns and Symbols', 2008) and Baltu dievestības pamati (lit. 'Fundamentals of the Baltic Religion', 2016).

Since 2023, the Latvijas Dievturu sadraudze has been developing the Dievturi Dictionary (Dievturu vārdnīca), an open access online resource for students and scholars focusing on Dievturība and Latvian traditional culture and religious studies.

== Beliefs ==
Dievturība is primarily rooted in Latvian folklore, folk songs and Latvian mythology. The main god is Dievs, who unifies spirit and matter, as well as other dualities such as father and mother or good and bad. Other deities are either aspects of Dievs or other types of non-deified spirits. The goddess Māra represents Dievs' material aspect. Laima is an aspect of Dievs, and connected to causality, fire, and fortune.

By necessity, modern Dievturība differs from the historical Latvian religion. For example, there is no evidence that the Latvian pagans recognized a trinity of deities; in Dievturība, Dievs, Māra and Laima are a triune godhead. In Dievturi theology, several triumvirates of deities and concepts are recognized.

Humans are believed to be naturally good due to the will of Dievs. The human is also understood as threefold, and consists of augums – physical body, velis – ancestral spirit, and dvēsele – soul. After death, the physical body is destroyed, the astral body enters the veļu valsts (world of shadows) and gradually disappears, and the soul is eternal and unifies with Dievs.

The end of autumn and the start of winter are accepted as the time of remembrance of dead ancestors. In the dark time of autumn, people gave food to their dead relatives due to the "dying of nature" or as a gesture of thanks for a good harvest during the summer.

Former President of Latvia Vaira Vīķe-Freiberga wrote that "the ancient Latvian did not think of himself as lord and ruler over nature, nor superior to nature, but rather he considered himself to be an inseparable ingredient of nature."

== See also ==
- Baltic Neopaganism
- Heathenry (new religious movement)
- Latvian mythology
- Romuva
