= The Shadow in the East =

2020 book by Aliide Naylor

The Shadow in the East: Vladimir Putin and the New Baltic Front
- First edition
- Author: Aliide Naylor
- Language: English
- Publisher: I.B. Tauris
- Publication date: January 23, 2020
- Publication place: United Kingdom
- Media type: Print (Hardback)
- Pages: 224
- ISBN: 9781788312523
- OCLC: 1120203753
- Dewey Decimal: 327.479
- LC Class: DK502.715

The Shadow in the East: Vladimir Putin and the New Baltic Front is a 2020 book by Aliide Naylor. The book documents Russia's relationship with Estonia, Latvia and Lithuania in the 21st century while exploring the unique identities of the three Baltic countries since the collapse of the Soviet Union.

The Moscow Times described the book as a "riveting debut", saying "Naylor combines lyrical personal observations with insightful political analysis to offer a timely and comprehensive picture of the complex societies, economies, and political landscapes of this frequently overlooked region." New Eastern Europe termed it a "captivating depiction of the relationship between domestic politics, geopolitics, socioeconomic issues and generational differences". In National Review, Andrew Stuttaford noted its coverage of contemporary Baltic life, "ranging from the hipsters of Tallinn, Riga, and Vilnius to little delivery robots trundling along Estonian streets, to song, folk culture, and even a spot of paganism."
