= List of hillforts in Latvia =

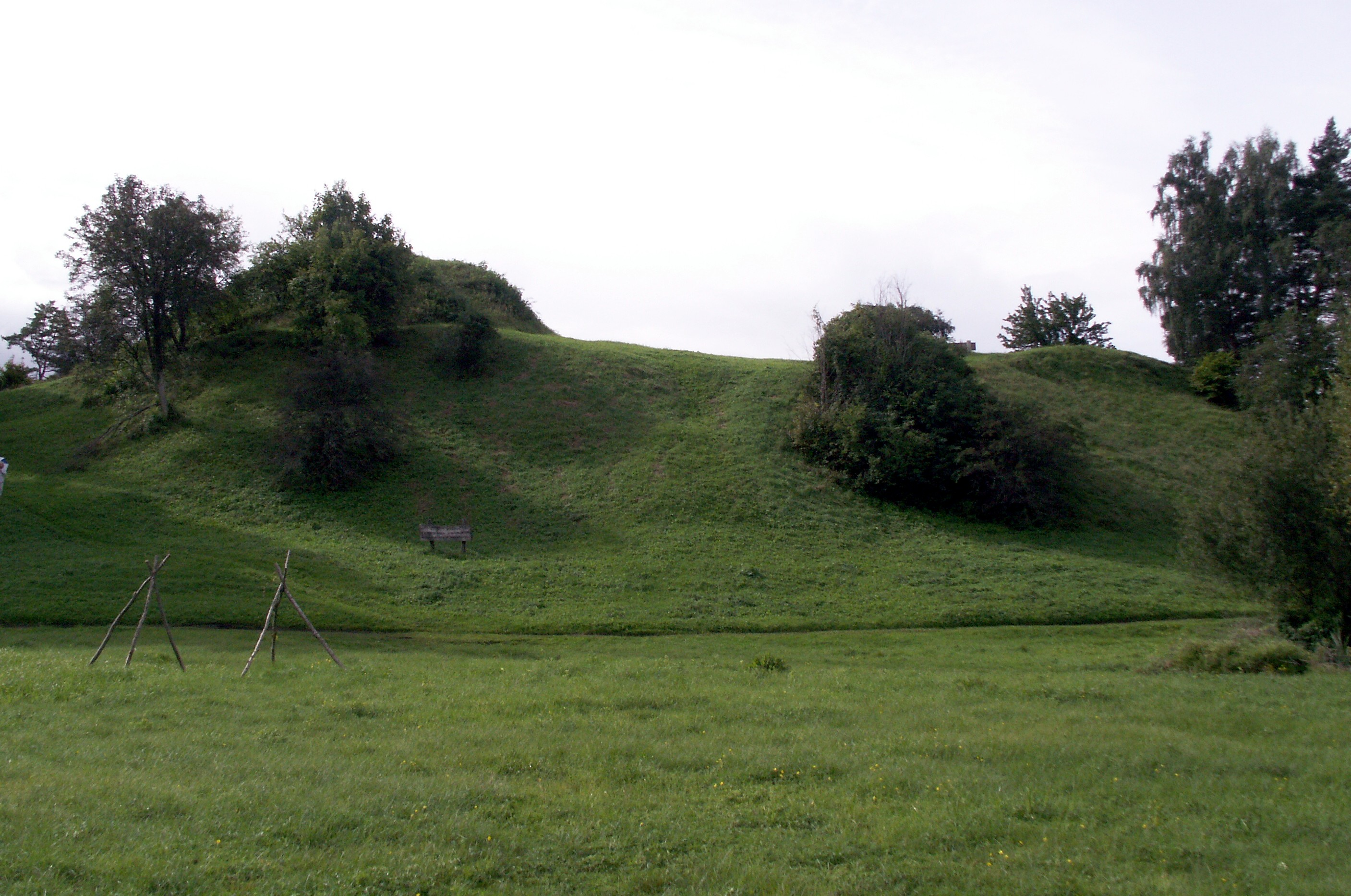
Tērvete hillfort. Main Semigallian centre in the late Iron Age

Hillforts in Latvia offered not only military and administrative functions but they were also cultural and economic centres of some regions. The Latvian word for hillfort is pilskalns (plural: pilskalni), from pils 'castle' and kalns 'hill'. Latvian hillforts generally were a part of a complex consisting of the main fortress, the settlement around it, one or more burial fields and nearby ritual sites. The first hillforts in Latvia, such as Daugmale hillfort, appeared during the Bronze Age. Some were continuously inhabited until the late Iron Age.

During the Roman Iron Age, some of the Latvian hillforts (like Ķivutkalns) were abandoned or became sparsely populated. A new period in hillfort development started during the 5th-8th centuries AD, when many new hillforts appeared, in most cases, along the main trades routes - rivers. During the 10th to 11th centuries, some of the hillforts became military fortresses with strong fortifications (like hillforts in Tērvete, Talsi, Mežotne). Some of them are considered important political centres of the local peoples, who in this period were subjects of serious social political changes. That period was known for unrest and military activities, as well as power struggles between local aristocracy. Most of the Latvian hillforts were destroyed or abandoned during the Livonian Crusade in the 13th century, but some were still used in the 14th century. In total, there are about 470 hillforts in Latvia.

== Latgale ==
- Asotes hill fort Media related to Asote hillfort at Wikimedia Commons
- Gribuļu hill fort
- Jersikas hill fort
- Kalvānu hill fort
- Kiuku hill fort
- Markovas hill fort
- Ratinīku hill fort
- Rēzeknes hill fort Media related to Rēzekne castle at Wikimedia Commons
- Silinīku hill fort
- Šokolādes hill fort
- Volkenbergas hill fort

== Selonia ==
- Dignājas hill fort
- Grūbeles hill fort
- Kalkūnes hill fort
- Kaupres hill fort
- Kņāvu hill fort
- Lašu hill fort
- Sēlpils hill fort Media related to Sēlpils Castle ruins at Wikimedia Commons
- Sērpiņu hill fort
- Stupeļu hill fort Media related to Stupeļu hillfort at Wikimedia Commons
- Zilais kalns hill fort

== Semigallia ==
- Daugmales hill fort
- Tērvetes hill fort Media related to Tērvete hillfort at Wikimedia Commons
- Incēnu hill fort Media related to Incenu hillfort at Wikimedia Commons
- Mežotnes hill fort Media related to Mežotne hillfort at Wikimedia Commons
- Raktes hill fort
- Spārnu hill fort Media related to Spārnu hillfort at Wikimedia Commons
- Svētkalns hill fort
- Babītes hill fort
- Sidrabenes hill fort

== Courland ==
- Aizputes hill fort
- Alsungas hill fort
- Ārlavas hill fort
- Buses (Matkule) hill fort Media related to Matkule hillfort at Wikimedia Commons
- Dundagas hill fort
- Dzintares hill fort
- Embūtes hill fort
- Grobiņas hill fort
- Kandavas hill fort Media related to Kandava hillfort at Wikimedia Commons
- Kazdangas hill fort
- Mežītes hill fort Media related to Mežītes hillfort at Wikimedia Commons
- Padures hill fort
- Pūres hill fort Media related to Pūre hillfort at Wikimedia Commons
- Puzes hill fort
- Sabiles hill fort
- Talsu hill fort Media related to Talsi hillfort at Wikimedia Commons
- Tukuma hill fort
- Ugāles hill fort
- Valtaiķu hill fort
- Vārtājas hill fort
- Veckuldīgas hill fort Media related to Veckuldīga hillfort at Wikimedia Commons
- Vecmoku hill fort

== Vidzeme ==
- Aizkraukles hill fort Media related to Aizkraukle hillfort at Wikimedia Commons
- Augstais hill fort
- Avotiņkalns hill fort
- Beverīna hill fort
- Dārznīcas hill fort
- Drusku hill fort Media related to Druskās (Korneti) hillfort at Wikimedia Commons
- Gribažu hill fort
- Kastrānes hill fort
- Kārtenes hill fort
- Kokneses hill fort
- Kubeseles hill fort
- Ķentes hill fort
- Ķivutkalns hill fort
- Ķoderu hill fort Media related to Ķoderu hillfort at Wikimedia Commons
- Metimnes hill fort
- Obzerkalns hill fort
- Oliņkalns hill fort
- Puduļu hill fort
- Pļaviņu hill fort
- Remines hill fort
- Riekstu hill fort
- Satezeles hill fort
- Sārumkalns hill fort
- Tanīsa hill fort
- Tempļa hill fort
- Ureles hill fort
- Zilaiskalns hill fort Media related to Zilaiskalns at Wikimedia Commons

== See also ==
- List of Estonian fortresses contains a common list of castles, fortresses, forts, an hillforts.
- List of hillforts in Lithuania

== Bibliography ==
- Bielenstein, August (1869). Die altlettischen Burgberge Kurlands. Riga.
- Moora, H (1929) [1929]. Die Eisenzeit in Lettland bis etwa 500 (paperback ed.).
