= Ernests Brastiņš =

Latvian artist and folklorist (1892–1942)

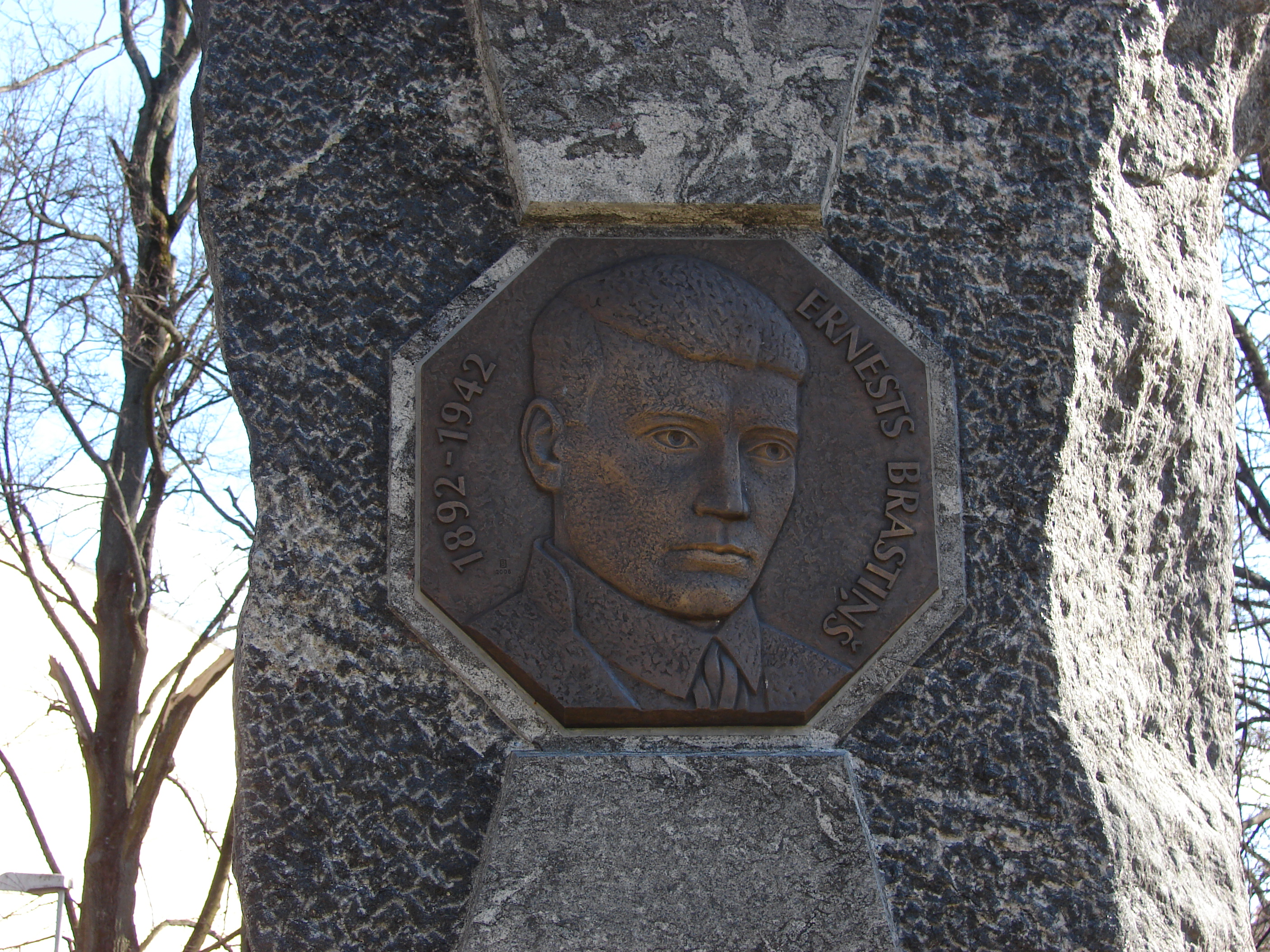
- Portrait of Ernests Brastiņš on his memorial stone in Riga
- Born: 15 October 1892; Lielstraupes pagasts, Governorate of Livonia
- Died: 28 January 1942 (aged 49); Russian SFSR, Soviet Union
- Education: Stieglitz Art Academy
- Occupations: Artist, museum director, religious leader

Ernests Brastiņš (19 March 1892 – 28 January 1942) was a Latvian artist, amateur historian, folklorist and archaeologist. He is known as the founder and driving force behind the neopagan religion Dievturība, which he started in the 1920s and which was re-established after the fall of the Soviet Union.

== Biography ==
Ernests Brastiņš was educated at the Stieglitz Art Academy in Saint Petersburg from 1911 to 1915. After military service in World War I and the Latvian War of Independence he became the director of the Latvian War Museum. During his time at the museum he studied Latvian history, Latvian ethnography, folk art and symbols, and investigated around 300 Latvian hill forts and the folklore connected to them.

In 1925, Brastiņš co-wrote a neopagan manifesto with Kārlis Marovskis-Bregžis, titled Latviešu dievturības atjaunojums (lit. 'The Restoration of Latvian Dievturība'). This marked the beginning of Dievturība, a Baltic neopagan religion based on pre-Christian Baltic religion, Latvian folk culture, and especially the folk songs known as dainas. The word Dievturība roughly means "the people who hold or live according to God's laws". With its focus on folklore and national character, the Dievturība movement carried on a cultural inheritance from the 19th-century Young Latvians movement. Brastiņš founded the first Dievturība organization with Marovskis-Bregžis in 1926, but due to disagreements he founded a new organization the year after with his sculptor brother, Arvīds Brastiņš.

Brastiņš' published works include three books on Latvian folk songs (1928–1929) and Dievtur̦u cerokslis (lit. 'The Intentions of Dievturi', 1932) which outlines the principles of Dievturība, modeled on Luther's Small Catechism. Having attracted prominent artists and intellectuals to the movement, Brastiņš unsuccessfully tried to have Dievturība adopted as the official state religion of Latvia.

After the 1934 Latvian coup d'état the movement was forced to re-register as a secular organization. Brastiņš' research as well as his religious engagements were terminated with the Soviet occupation of Latvia in 1940. He was arrested by the Soviet security services on 6 July 1940. On 24 May 1941, he was sentenced to eight years in a correctional labour camp in Russia for having founded and led the Dievturība organization. He was put on another trial in Russia on 27 January 1942 and was sentenced to death. The execution was carried out the following day.

== Legacy ==
During the Soviet era the Dievturība religion primarily lived on abroad in Latvian émigré communities. These varied in their view of it as a religion or just as a way to preserve Latvian traditions. The movement was officially re-registered in Latvia on 18 April 1990. Its contemporary adherents recognize Brastiņš as its founder and leading ideologue.

On 26 October 2006, a monument to Brastiņš was unveiled in the Kronvald Park in central Riga, close to the Riga Congress Hall. The four and a half meter tall stone monument features an embedded bronze disc with a relief portrait of Brastiņš on its northern side, and on its southern side a sun symbol and the words "Tautai" (Folk), "Dievam" (God) and "Tēvijai" (Fatherland). It was made by the sculptor Uldis Sterģis in collaboration with the stonecutter Robertu Zvagūzis and the medal artist Jānis Strupulis.

== Bibliography ==
Year	Title	Publisher
1923	Latviešu ornamentika	
1923–1930	Latvijas pilskalni (1. Kuršu Zeme - 2. Zemgale un Augšzeme - 3. Latgale - 4. Vidzeme)	
1925	Latviešu dievturības atjaunojums	
1925	Latvju rakstu kompozīcija	
1927	Daiļa sēta	
1929	Latvju gadskārtas dziesmas	Latvju dievtur̦u draudzes izdevums
1932	Dievturu cerokslis	Latvijas dievtur̦u sadraudzes izdevums
1936	Latvijas zvaigznes	
1936	Tautības mācība	
1938	Samulsuma pārspēšana: pareizības filozofijas pamatdomas	Zemnieka Domas

== Citations and references ==
=== Cited sources ===
- Hanovs, Deniss; Tēraudkalns, Valdis (2016). "The Return of the Gods? Authoritarian Culture and Neo-Paganism in Interwar Latvia, 1934–1940". In Smith, David J. (ed.). Latvia—A Work in Progress?: 100 Years of State- and Nation-Building. Soviet and Post-Soviet Politics and Society. New York: Columbia University Press. ISBN 9783838267180.
- "Piemineklis etnogrāfam un dievturim Ernestam Brastiņam (1892-942)" (in Latvian). Riga monument agency.
