= Baltic neopaganism =

Category of autochthonous religious movements

Baltic neopaganism is a category of autochthonous religious movements which have revitalised within the Baltic people (primarily Lithuanians and Latvians). These movements trace their origins back to the 19th century and they were suppressed under the Soviet Union; after its fall, they have witnessed a blossoming alongside the national and cultural identity reawakening of the Baltic peoples, both in their homelands and among expatriate Baltic communities, with close ties to conservation movements. One of the first ideologues of the revival was the Prussian Lithuanian poet and philosopher Vydūnas.

During the Pope Francis's visit to the Baltic states in 2018, the Dievturība and Romuva movements sent a joint letter to Pope Francis calling him to urge fellow Christians "to respect our own religious choice and cease impeding our efforts to achieve national recognition of the ancient Baltic faith". The movements have said that they dislike the usage of the term "pagan" as it is "loaded with centuries of prejudice and persecution".

== Movements ==
=== Dievturība ===
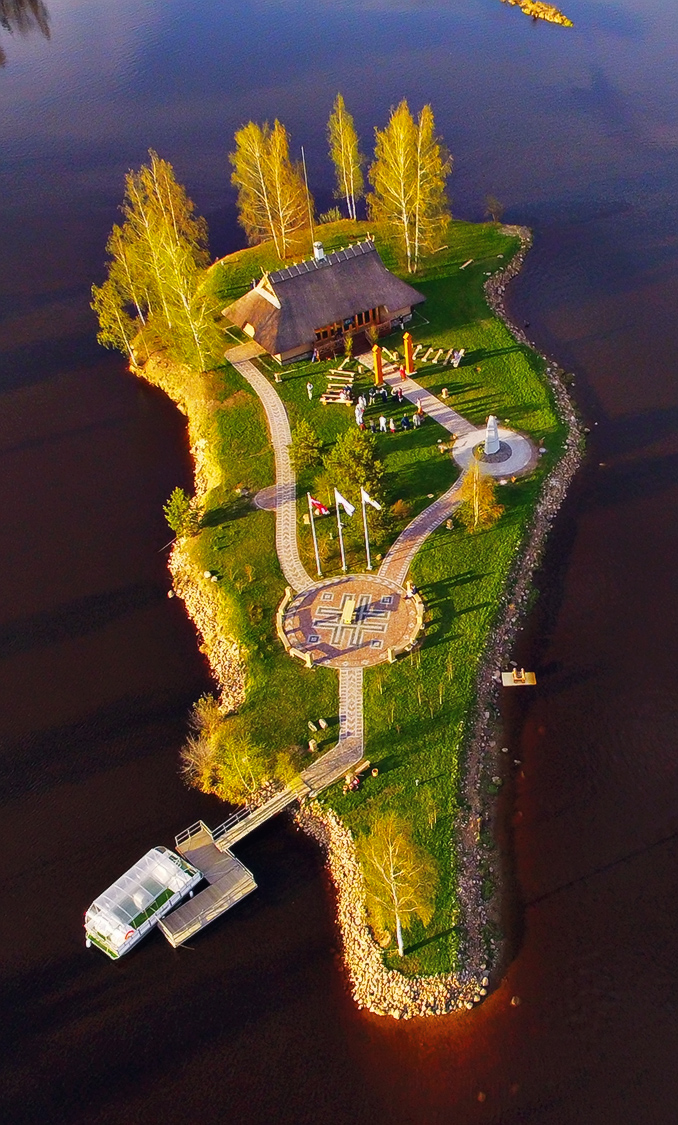
Aerial view of Lokstene Shrine of Dievturi

Dievturība (Latvian compound derived from Dievs "God", plus turēt "hold", "uphold", "behold", "keep"; literally "Godkeeping") is a Latvian Pagan revival, also present among Latvian Canadian and Latvian American expatriate communities. It is characterised by a monistic theological approach to Baltic paganism viewing all the gods and all nature as expression of the Dievs. A common view is that the Dievs is at the same time the transcendent fountain of reality, the matter-energy substrate, and the law ordaining the universe.

The movement was started in 1925 by Ernests Brastiņš with the publication of the book entitled Revival of Latvian Dievturība. After the annexation of Latvia to the Soviet Union the Dievturi were repressed, but the movement continued to operate among exiles. Since the 1990s, Dievturi was re-introduced to Latvia and began to grow again; in 2011 there were about 663 official members. The Lokstene Shrine of Dievturi was inaugurated in 2017.

=== Romuva ===
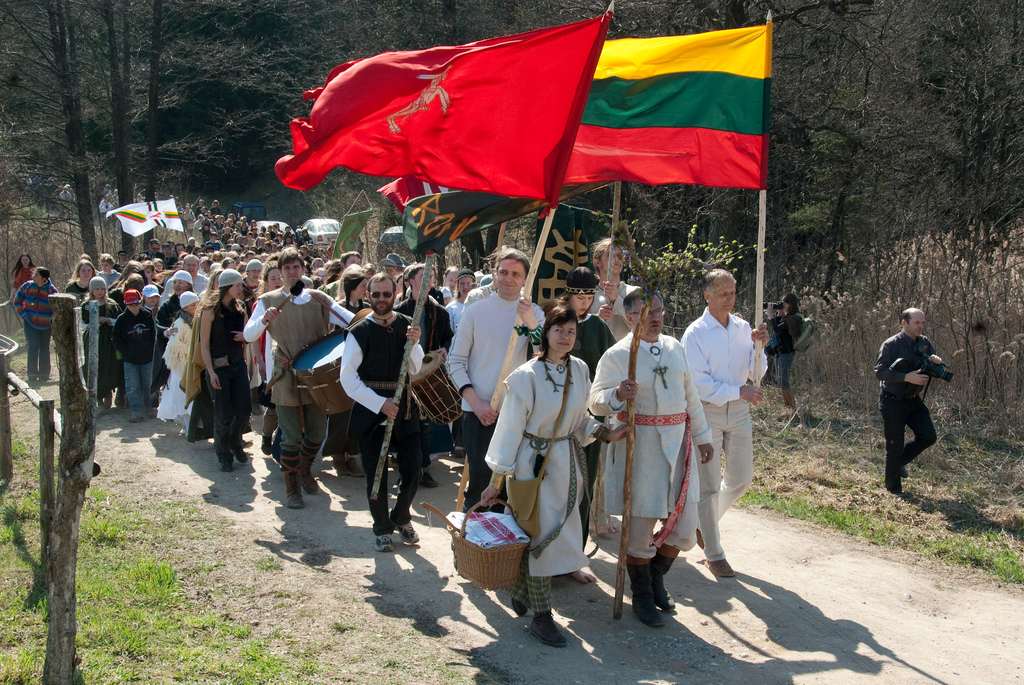
A Romuvan procession.

Romuva is a modern revival of the traditional ethnic religion of the Baltic peoples, reviving the religious practices of the Lithuanians before their Christianization. Romuva claims to continue living Baltic pagan traditions which survived in folklore and customs.

Romuva exists primarily in Lithuania but there are also congregations of adherents in Australia, Canada, the United States, and England. There are also Romuviai in Norway. Practising the Romuva faith is seen by many adherents as a form of cultural pride, along with celebrating traditional forms of art, retelling Baltic folklore, practising traditional holidays, playing traditional Baltic music, singing traditional dainas or hymns and songs as well as ecological activism and stewarding sacred places.

=== Other ===
The re-enactment group Vilkatlakai, originally named Baltuva, formed in Lithuania in 1995 and is distinguished by its masculine vision of Baltic paganism. The Kuronas movement formed in 2003 as a split from Romuva, expressing dissatisfaction with the Romuva leadership's emphasis on ethnographical studies at the expense of theology. They were also critical of Romuva's openness to the media and other outsiders at religious events.

== Bibliography ==
- Gatis Ozoliņš: Die aktuelle kettische Dievturi-Bewegung; in: René Gründer et al.: Der andere Glaube; Ergon Verlag, 2009. ISBN 978-3-89913-688-3
- Dundzila & Strmiska, Romuva: Lithuanian Paganism in Lithuania and America in Strmiska (ed)., Modern Paganism in World Cultures: Comparative Perspectives; ABC-CLIO, 2005.
- Dundzila, V. R., Baltic Lithuanian Religion and Romuva in TYR vol. 3; Ultra Press, 2007.
- Ignatow, G., Cultural Heritage and the Environment in Lithuania in Transnational Identity Politics and the Environment; Lexington Books, 2007.
- Melton, J. Gordon; Baumann, Martin, eds. (2010). "Paganism in Latvia". Religions of the world: a comprehensive encyclopedia of beliefs and practices. Vol. 4 (2nd ed.). Santa Barbara; Denver; Oxford: ABC-CLIO. ISBN 978-1-59884-203-6.
- Misane, Agita. 2000. The Traditional Latvian Religion of Dievturiba in the Discourse of Nationalism. Religious Minorities in Latvia 4, no. 29: 33–52.
- Muktupāvels, Valdis (2005). "Baltic Religion: New Religious Movements". In Lindsay Jones (ed.). Encyclopedia of Religion: 15 Volume Set. Vol. 2 (2nd ed.). Detroit, Mi: MacMillan Reference USA. pp. 762–767. ISBN 0-02-865735-7. Archived from the original on 2024-09-25.
- Naylor, A., The Shadow in the East; I.B. Tauris, 2020.
- Pranskevičiūtė, Rasa; Aleknaitė, Eglė (2014). "Šiuolaikinė pagonybė Lietuvoje: matomos ir nematomos grupės" [Modern paganism in Lithuania: visible and invisible groups]. In Ališauskienė, Milda (ed.). Religijų įvairovė Lietuvoje: portretai, kasdienybė ir šventės [Religious diversity in Lithuania: portraits, everyday life and festivals] (PDF) (in Lithuanian). Kaunas and Vilnius: Vytauto Didžiojo universitetas, Versus aureus. pp. 170–173. ISBN 978-609-467-085-5.
- Wiench, Piotr. Neopaganism in CentralEastern Europe, Spoleczenstwo otwarte 4, 1995.; 5th World Congress of Central and Eastern European Studies in Warsaw, 1995.
- Schnirelmann, Victor: "Christians! Go home": A Revival of Neo-Paganism between the Baltic Sea and Transcaucasia. Journal of Contemporary Religion, Vol. 17, No. 2, 2002.
- Strmiska, F. Michael. Modern Paganism in World Cultures. ABC-CLIO, 2005. ISBN 978-1-85109-608-4
