= Klintaine Parish =

Parish of Latvia

- parish of Latvia
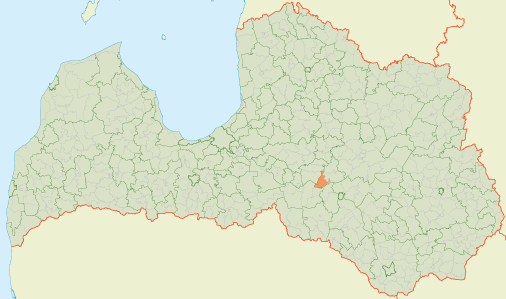
- 56°37′27″N 25°35′39″E
- Country: Latvia

Area
  - Total: 93.76 km^{2} (36.20 sq mi)
  - Land: 86.51 km^{2} (33.40 sq mi)
  - Water: 7.25 km^{2} (2.80 sq mi)

Population (1 January 2026)
  - Total: 586
  - Density: 6.77/km^{2} (17.5/sq mi)

Klintaine Parish (Latvian: Klintaines pagasts) is an administrative unit of Aizkraukle Municipality in the Vidzeme region of Latvia. As of 2011 population of Klintaine Parish is 855 people.

== Towns, villages and settlements of Klintaine Parish ==
- Alkšņi
- Čulkstēni
- Dīķīši
- Klintaine
- Mūrnieki
- Rīteri
- Salas
- Stukmaņi
- Sturti
- Zemlejas
