= European religion =

European religion may refer to:

- Religion in Europe
- Religion in the European Union
- Native ethnic religions of Europe
  - Ancient Greek religion
  - Religion in ancient Rome
  - Etruscan mythology
  - Celtic polytheism
  - Germanic paganism
  - Slavic mythology
  - Finnic mythologies

== See also ==
- Proto-Indo-European religion
