= European Islam =

Hypothesized new branch of Islam

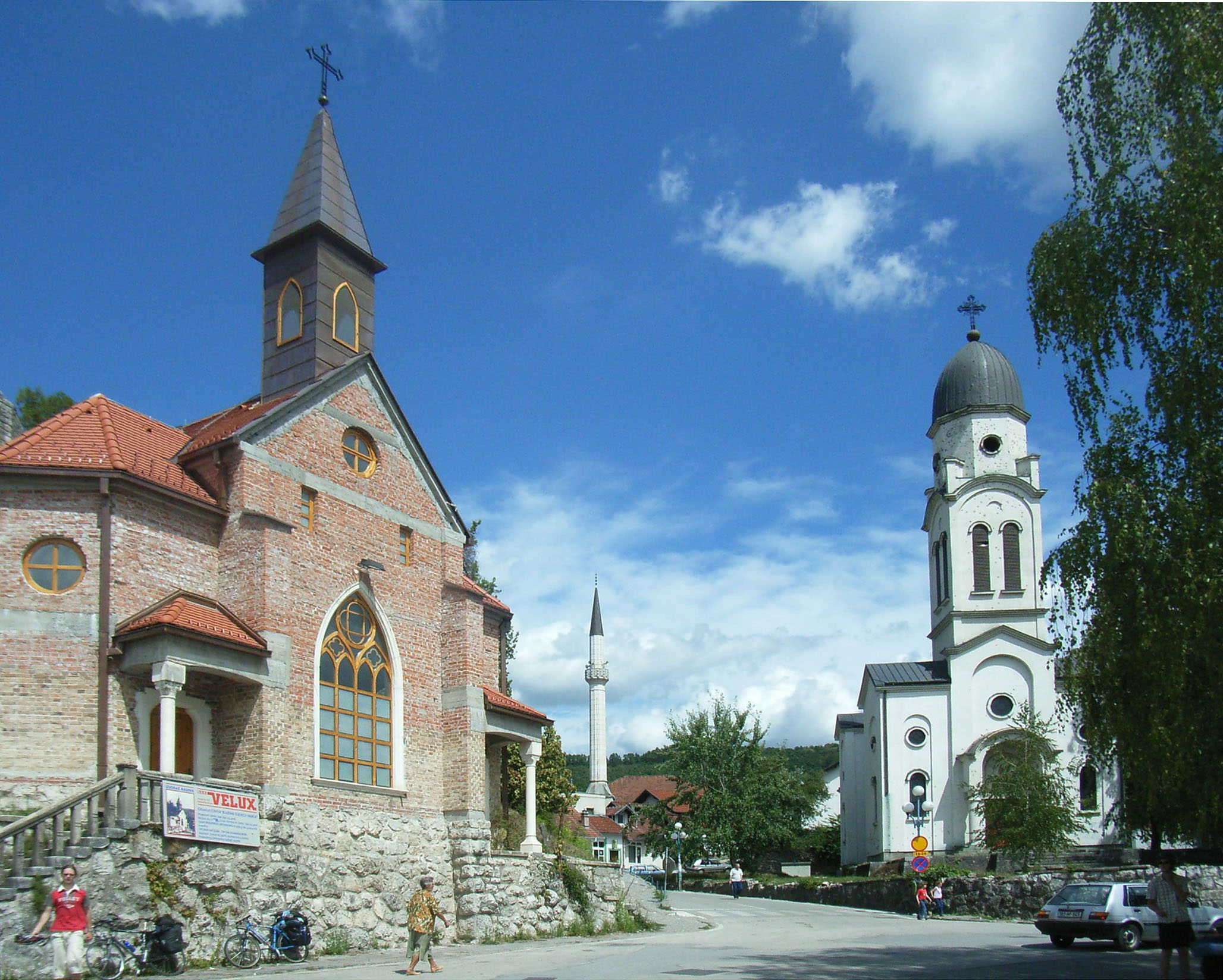
A Roman Catholic church, Eastern Orthodox church, and Muslim mosque are located in the same square in Bosanska Krupa, Federation of Bosnia and Herzegovina.

Muslim population of Europe by country and region, showing percentage of population identifying as Muslim. Subdivision-level data shown for countries where regional variation is significant.

European Islam, or Euro-Islam, is a hypothesized new branch of Islam that historically originated and developed among the European peoples of the Balkans (primarily Albania, Bosnia and Herzegovina, Kosovo, and European Turkey, but also in Bulgaria, Montenegro, and North Macedonia, countries with sizable Muslim minorities). These communities, alongside those in some republics of Russia, constitute a large population which constitute large populations of European Muslims. Historically significant Muslim populations in Europe include Azerbaijanis, Ashkali and Balkan Egyptians, Balkan Turks, Bosniaks, Böszörmény, Chechens, Circassians, Cretan Turks, Crimean Tatars, Gajals, Gorani, Greek Muslims, Ingush, Khalyzians, Kazakhs, Lipka Tatars, Muslim Albanians, Muslim Romani people, Pomaks, Torbeshi, Turks, Turkish Cypriots, Vallahades, Volga Tatars, Yörüks, and Megleno-Romanians from Notia today living in East Thrace, although the majority are secular.

The terms "European Islam" and "Euro-Islam" were originally introduced at a conference that took place in Birmingham in 1988, presided by Carl E. Olivestam, senior lecturer at Umeå University, and subsequently published in the Swedish handbook Kyrkor och alternativa rörelser ("Churches and Alternative Movements"). "European Islam" defines the ongoing debate on the social integration of Muslim populations in Western European countries such as France, Germany, the United Kingdom, and the Netherlands. There are three Islamic scholars who participate in the debate on "Euro-Islam": Enes Karić, Bassam Tibi, and Tariq Ramadan, who adopted the term in the second half of the 1990s but use it with different meanings. The foremost Western, Non-Muslim scholars of political science and/or Islamic studies involved in the debate on "Euro-Islam" are Jocelyne Cesari, Jørgen S. Nielsen, and Olivier Roy.

== Proponents ==
=== Bassam Tibi ===
German-Syrian Bassam Tibi is considered the original coiner of the term "Euro-Islam", which he used for the first time in his 1992 paper Les conditions d'une "Euro-Islam", published in 1995, to describe a type of Islam that embraces Western political values, such as liberal democracy, religious pluralism, secularism, tolerance, and the separation between religion and state. He argues that Muslims in Europe must create a specific form of Islam that can coexist with European values. The term reflects a concept for the integration of Muslims as European citizens, often assuming a liberal and progressive interpretation based on the idea of Europeanizing Islam. Tibi dissociates himself from the Islamists, who reject Euro-Islam; he estimates that they amount to 3–5% of the Muslims currently living in Europe. He says they are nevertheless a dangerous minority since they want to "hijack" the Muslim community and other values of civil society. More precisely, Tibi seeks to dissociate his reasoning on Euro-Islam from that of Tariq Ramadan, whom he considers a rival within Islam in Europe.

Tibi speaks of the need of Muslims to become "European citizens of the heart". Tibi insists that Euro-Islam means secularity, the acceptance of separation between religion and state, as well as that Muslims living in Europe should embrace European values. As contrast he sees the ghettoization of the Muslims with potential for conflict. Therefore, Euro-Islam is for Tibi a way out from the issue of the ethnicization of Muslim migration in Europe and a democratic alternative to the so-called "ethnicity of fear". Despite his efforts for the establishment of European Islam, after 25 years of leadership towards promoting it as a driving force of reform among Muslims living in Europe, Bassam Tibi in 2016 announced "I capitulate" in the German political magazine Cicero, stating that the "headscarf Islam" has triumphed over the "Euro-Islam".

=== Tariq Ramadan ===
Tariq Ramadan is erroneously considered to be one of the coiners of the term "European Islam". Ramadan calls for creating a new European-Muslim identity in his book To Be a European Muslim (1999). He demands participation of Muslims in social and cultural life in conformation with European culture and Muslim ethics and says Muslims should disassociate themselves from Saudi Arabia and Islamic terrorism. He also thinks that European Muslims "need to separate Islamic principles from their cultures of origin and anchor them in the cultural reality of Western Europe." However, Ramadan says that "Europeans also must start considering Islam as a European religion."

=== Maria Luisa Maniscalco ===
Maria Luisa Maniscalco, professor of Sociology at the University of Roma Tre, in her book "European Islam. Sociology of an encounter", considers that in a process of "Europeanisation" of Muslims and "Islamization" of Europe, directions of change are diverse. While family law, the status of women, religious freedom, social justice and criminal laws are still areas of high controversy within Islam, in Europe and elsewhere, and in comparison with European societies, attempts to Islamize modernity performed in European territory and in dialogue with Europe express creativity and innovation capacity. According to Maniscalco, when different segments of the Muslim world in Europe propose themselves and act as "active minorities", being able to take leadership and provide new impetus towards a dynamic and positive meeting, this will be significant for the future of Europe.

=== Xavier Bougarel ===
Xavier Bougarel, research fellow at the Centre national de la recherche scientifique in the Ottoman and Turkish Studies unit, thinks that Balkan Muslims are playing an important role in shaping Islam in Europe towards a European Islam. With the possible EU enlargement towards the Balkans, about eight million Muslims would become EU citizens, doubling the number of Muslims in the EU-27 bloc. Bougarel explores Balkan Islam which is often called "European Islam" because it resulted from indigenous and largely secularized in opposition to "a non-European Islam" that embody not only the predominantly Muslim countries but also the Muslim populations newly settled in Western Europe. Xavier Bougarel proposes replacing these culturalist visions with an accurate comparison that takes into account the nuances of Islam in Western Europe and the Balkans.

=== Jocelyne Cesari ===
Jocelyne Cesari, Professor of Religion and Politics and Director of Research at Edward Cadbury Centre at University of Birmingham, as well as President of European Academy of Religion, says that while Islam is perceived as colliding with European secular values "Islam is simply a religion." According to Cesari, Muslims need to reveal the "genuine tolerant face of Islam, to show its diversity and reveal to the world that an intellectual such as Muhammad Abduh is the best example for a modern thinker."

Cesari talks of the secularization of individual Islamic practices and of Islamic institutions, as well as the efforts Muslims are making to maintain the relevancy of Islamic legal systems and what she calls the "gender jihad". She thinks that Islam should be merged into European culture and that Islamic culture should be added to Europe's educational curricula. She has also held post as research associate at the Center for Middle Eastern Studies at Harvard University and director of Islamopedia Online.

=== Jørgen S. Nielsen ===
Jørgen S. Nielsen, professor of Islamic studies at the University of Copenhagen, says that "Europeanizing" Islam "requires changes in relations between the sexes, in relations between parents and children, significant changes in attitudes to people of other religions, and in attitudes toward the State." Nielsen believes that this is happening. While only a minority of Muslims are assimilating completely with secular European culture, "the majority are sticking to their religion but divorcing it from the cultural tradition and redressing it in a new culture." Nielsen also argues that the emergence of a European Islam is not only linked to the Muslim communities in Europe, but also to structures inherited from European society and the State.

=== Other approaches to integration ===
==== Robert S. Leiken ====
Robert S. Leiken says that both multiculturalism and assimilation have failed, and that an integration policy still needs to be developed, something that will not happen overnight.

== European Commission proposal ==
Following the failed car bomb attacks in London and the failed Glasgow airport attack in June 2007, the European Commission started pooling ideas on how to tackle radical Islam and create a "European Islam", i.e. an Islam which is a more tolerant "European" branch of the faith. EU home affairs commissioner Franco Frattini also sent out an 18-question survey asking EU member states how they address violent radicalisation, mainly related to an abusive interpretation of Islam. In addition, Mr Frattini wants to pursue and further the idea of establishing a so-called "European Islam" or "Islam de l'Europe" – something floated by France's then interior minister Nicolas Sarkozy in 2006.

== See also ==
- American Islam (term)
- Islam and democracy
- Islam and feminism
- Islam and secularism
- Islam in Europe
- Islam in Russia
- LGBTQ people and Islam
- Liberal and progressive movements within Islam
- Muslim world
- Political aspects of Islam
- Religion in the European Union
