= Bulgaria–Holy See relations =

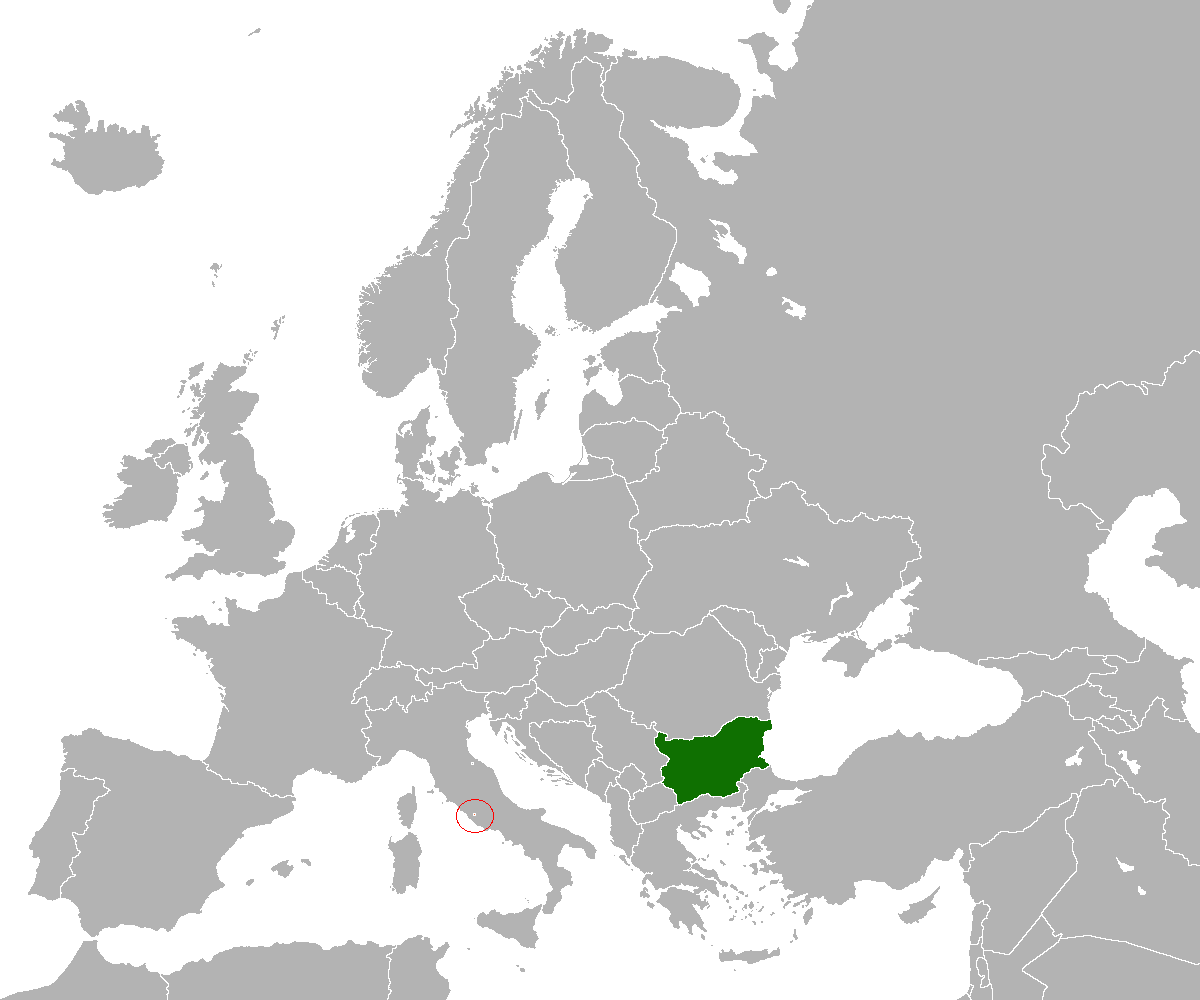

- Bulgaria: Holy See

Bulgaria–Holy See relations were formally established in 1990, shortly after the fall of the Bulgarian communist government. Since then, Bulgaria and the Holy See have had an increase in relations, with Pope John Paul II visiting the country in 2002, and more recently visits from Secretary of State Angelo Sodano (2005) and Pietro Parolin (2016).

The Holy See maintains an apostolic nunciature in Sofia whereas Bulgaria has an embassy near Vatican City. The current Bulgarian ambassador to the Vatican is Kiril Topalov, while the Vatican's apostolic nuncio is Archbishop Anselmo Guido Pecorari.

== History ==
The two states have historically had distant relations due to the split between the Catholic Church and the Eastern Orthodox Church. In medieval history, contact between Bulgaria and the Papal States (to which Holy See is formal successor) was limited. In 1925, Angelo Roncalli was sent to the Kingdom of Bulgaria as the apostolic visitor by Pope Pius XI, before being appointed as the apostolic delegate in the country in 1931. There were never formal diplomatic relations between the Bulgarian kingdom and the Holy See, but the government tacitly acknowledged the Holy See's presence and work inside the country. In February 1949, the foreign ministry of the Bulgarian People's Republic removed all legal recognition of the Holy See.

Shortly after World War II, the Communist Party of Bulgaria initially showed benevolence towards Catholic organizations in the country prior to the signing of the Paris Peace Treaty to demonstrate its democratic values to the Western Allies. But after the signing the new government began its crackdown on Catholic organizations, justifying it by claiming that the Catholic Church in Bulgaria backed reactionary anti-democratic opposition. At an Orthodox conference in Moscow, in July 1948, they accused the Holy See of supporting Italian fascism and called for the abrogation of concordats with the Catholic Church. In a letter to the Vatican Secretary of State, Foreign Minister Vasil Kolarov declared that Bulgaria no longer recognized the Holy See and that its apostolic delegation had no legal status.

Relations between the Holy See and Bulgaria were tense during the communist era, though Agostino Casaroli worked to maintained relations with some Eastern bloc countries. Their relations began warming up in the 1980s until the collapse of communism, with the newly formed Republic of Bulgaria requesting to reestablish diplomatic relations with the Holy See in December 1990. The Bulgarian foreign ministry granted the Catholic Church in Bulgaria equal rights under the law in 1989, as part of the democratization process. The Catholic Church still faced some challenges in post-communist Bulgaria, but the visit of Pope John Paul II in 2002 and efforts made by the former Tsar of Bulgaria, Simeon Saxe-Coburg-Gotha, helped improve the situation for Catholics in the country.

== Papal Visits to Bulgaria ==
- Pope John Paul II
  - 23 – 26 May 2002 – Sofia, Plovdiv and Rila Monastery
- Pope Francis
  - 5 - 7 May 2019 - Sofia and Rakovski

== See also ==
- Foreign relations of Bulgaria
- Foreign relations of the Holy See
- Holy See–European Union relations
