= Islamopedia Online =

Website for information regarding Islam

- Website type: Informative
- Available in: English
- Founded: 2007; 19 years ago
- Owner: Harvard University
- Founder: Abu Zaynah
- Website: islamopedia.co.uk
- Commercial: No
- Current status: inactive

Islamopedia Online is a website dedicated to providing a comprehensive database of information regarding Islam, its most influential leaders, and translations of current topics and religious opinions.

== Contents ==
The stated purpose of Islamopedia Online is to provide news and background analysis on Muslim countries and Islamic topics that are not covered in the Western media due to lack of familiarity with the country, the issues, or the personalities as well as the inability to access reliable sources in their original language. Islamopedia features a database of what they deem the most important religious figures in the Muslim world including their positions. Islamopedia also provides a translation in English of major news articles translated from Arabic, Urdu, and Farsi.

Islamopedia Online is part of the Islam in the West Program, hosted at the Alwaleed Islamic Studies Program at Harvard University. It is financially supported by the Berkley Center for Religion, Peace and World Affairs at Georgetown University, the Islamic Legal Studies Program at Harvard University, the Transatlantic Program on Islam in the West based at the Centre national de la recherche scientifique (CNRS) in Paris, the Social Science Research Council, and the Minerva Fellowship. It is directed by Jocelyne Cesari.

Through its analysis, Islamopedia has concluded that Salafi, Wahabi, and Athari websites dominate the web due to "context collapse" where individuals can ask questions without reprisal or exposure because the internet "annihilates the context and the identity of the user." Hence the many users accept the answer as the "true Islam" even though they may not apply it to their lives; instead the use of the Islamic website solidifies their identification as Muslim in opposition to the West even though one does not adhere to its edicts or instructions. They also solicit papers from experts for inclusion in the database.

== Development ==
Islamopedia Online was founded in 2007 with a grant from the Carnegie Foundation. Its members initiated a comprehensive survey of major topics, opinions, and authorities in the Islamic world determining that the best resource they could provide was in aggregating information from websites that provided religious opinions from Islamic scholars and leaders. Focusing on Arabic, Farsi, Turkish, Urdu, and English, they have collected and aggregated 44,000 entries from over 100 separate websites.

== Advisory board ==
The advisory board of Islamopedia Online includes:

- Mahmoud Al-Saify, lecturer in Islamic Studies at Radboud University Nijmegen in the Netherlands
- Abdullahi Ahmed An-Na'im, Charles Howard Candler Professor of Law at Emory Law School
- Gadis Arivia, professor of Philosophy and Gender Studies at the University of Indonesia
- Ali S. Asani, professor of Indo-Muslim and Islamic Religion and Cultures at Harvard University
- Margot Badran, senior fellow, Prince Alwaleed bin Talal Center for Muslim-Christian Understanding, Georgetown University
- Gary Bunt, senior lecturer in Islamic Studies at the University of Wales
- Farid Esack, Former Prince Al-Waleed Bin Talal Visiting professor of Islamic Studies at Harvard Divinity School
- John Esposito, professor and founding director of the Prince Alwaleed Bin Talal Center for Muslim-Christian Understanding at Georgetown University
- Mohammad Fadel, professor of law at the University of Toronto
- Noah Feldman, Bemis Professor of Law at Harvard Law School
- Bruno Guiderdoni, Institut d Astrophysique de Paris
- Mohamed Haddad Holder of UNESCO Chair of Comparative Religious, University of Manouba
- Pervez Hoodbhoy, Quaid-e-Azam University
- Ekmeleddin İhsanoğlu, Secretary-General of the Organization of the Islamic Conference
- Nahid Afrose Kabir, senior research fellow, International Centre for Muslim and non-Muslim Understanding, Hawke Research Institute, University of South Australia
- Sahar Khamis, assistant professor in the Department of Communications at the University of Maryland at College Park
- Rami Khouri, Director of the Issam Fares Institute for Public Policy and International Affairs in Beirut
- Asim Khwaja, professor of Public Policy at Harvard Kennedy School
- Jens Kutscher, Faculty of Law at Friedrich Alexander University in Germany
- Lilia Labidi, professor of Anthropology and Psychology, University of Tunis (see entry on French Wikipedia Lilia Labidi)
- Bruce Lawrence, professor and Director of Duke Islamic Studies Center
- Tarek Massoud, assistant professor of Public Policy at Harvard Kennedy School of Government
- Ziba Mir-Hosseini, Hauser Global Law Visiting professor at New York University
- Muhammed el-Nawawy, professor and Knight-Crane Endowed Chair in the Department of Communication at Queens University of Charlotte
- Ruud Peters, professor of Arabic Law and Culture at the University of Amsterdam
- Tariq Ramadan, professor of Contemporary Islamic Studies at Oxford University
- Yoginder Sikand, researcher at the Centre for the Study of Social Exclusion at the National Law School in Bangalore
- Mohammed Tozy, professor of Political Science at Hassan II University of Casablanca (see entry on French Wikipedia Mohamed Tozy)
- Daniel Martin Varisco, professor and director of Middle Eastern and Central Asian Studies at Hofstra University in New York
- Frank Vogel, founding director of the Islamic Legal Studies Program, Harvard Law School
- Imtiyaz Yusuf, lecturer at the Graduate School of Philosophy and Religion at Assumption University in Bangkok
