= Holy See–European Union relations =

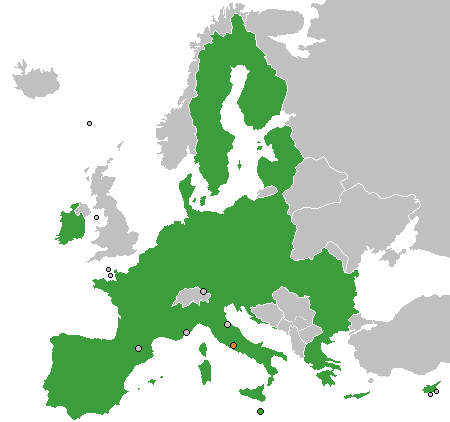
- European Union: Vatican City

Holy See–European Union relations are the relations between the European Union (EU) and the Holy See (including the Holy See's sovereign territory known as the Vatican City State). (Note: While the Holy See and the Vatican City State are not synonymous, under the Lateran Treaty Vatican City is under "full ownership, exclusive dominion, and sovereign authority and jurisdiction" of the Holy See and ultimate authority of each in terms of international relations have the same impact in terms of the topics discussed in this article)

== Cooperation ==
While neither entity is a member of the European Union, the Holy See and Vatican City are intrinsically linked to the EU. Vatican City has an open border with Italy, and therefore with the entire Schengen Area of which Italy is part. In 2006, Vatican City indicated an interest in joining the Schengen Information System. Both the Holy See and Vatican City use the euro as sole legal currency and Vatican euro coins are minted under an EU-approved agreement with Italy. The EU gave Italy authority to negotiate a deal with the Holy See in 2000 which allowed the Holy See to mint a maximum of €670,000. After a review of the arrangements, a new agreement came into force in 2010, which allowed it to mint €1 million a year (plus up to an additional €300,000 on special occasions).

According to the European Union's Copenhagen criteria for determining eligibility of states to join the EU, a candidate state must be a free market democracy. Given that the Holy See is not a state and Vatican City functions as an elective absolute monarchy with only one major economic actor (the state itself), neither meet the criteria.

Vatican City is not part of the European Union Customs Union or the EU's VAT area, unlike some other small European states. However Vatican City is exempt from duties and taxes and the small amount of goods exported from Vatican City are exempt from duty.

== Representations ==
The first representative from the Holy See, an Apostolic Nuncio, was accredited to the EU in 1970. The role of the EU's representative to the Holy See is accorded to the EU representative to the UN in Rome: currently Ambassador Yves Gazzo. The first EU representative to the Holy See was Luis Ritto, accredited in 2006. This accreditation followed a visit by Commission President José Manuel Barroso who wished to create open full diplomatic relations between the two.

== Points of tension ==
The disagreements between European Union and Holy See have been:

- A disagreement over whether to include a reference to Europe's Christian heritage in the European Constitution
- The European Parliament refused to ratify Rocco Buttiglione as a European Commissioner because he backed the Catholic Church's view on homosexuality
- The European Union endorsed the Sandbaek Report, increasing funding for abortion
- The funding of embryonic stem cell research by the European Union
- The European Parliament passed a motion calling for the compulsory recognition of same-sex unions across the European Union

== Membership ==
Countries that could join the European Union Current members Candidate countries Applicant / potential candidate countries Membership possible Membership not possible

The Vatican City (the smallest state in the world) is an ecclesiastical or sacerdotal-monarchical state, and as such does not have the democratic credentials to join the EU (Art. 49 TEU) and is unlikely to attain them given its unique status. Additionally its economy is also of a unique non-commercial nature. Overall, the mission of the Vatican City state, which is tied to the mission of the Holy See, has little to do with the objectives of the EU Treaty. Thus EU membership is not discussed, even though the country is totally surrounded by an EU member state.

== Holy See's foreign relations with EU member states ==
- Austria
- Belgium
- Bulgaria
- Croatia
- Cyprus
- Czech Republic
- Denmark
- Estonia
- Finland
- France
- Germany
- Greece
- Hungary
- (Republic of Ireland) Ireland
- Italy
- Latvia
- Lithuania
- Luxembourg
- Malta
- Netherlands
- Poland
- Portugal
- Romania
- Slovakia
- Slovenia
- Spain
- Sweden

== See also ==
- Foreign relations of the European Union
- Foreign relations of the Holy See
- Apostolic Nunciature to the European Union
- Religion in the European Union
- Microstates and the European Union
