= Religion in the European Union =

Religion in the European Union (2021)
1. Catholicism (45.3%)
2. Eastern Orthodoxy (10.0%)
3. Protestantism (8.30%)
4. Other Christian (2.60%)
5. Islam (1.40%)
6. Other religion (5.60%)
7. No religion/Agnosticism (15.0%)
8. Atheism (10.4%)
9. Don't know and refusal to answer (1.40%)

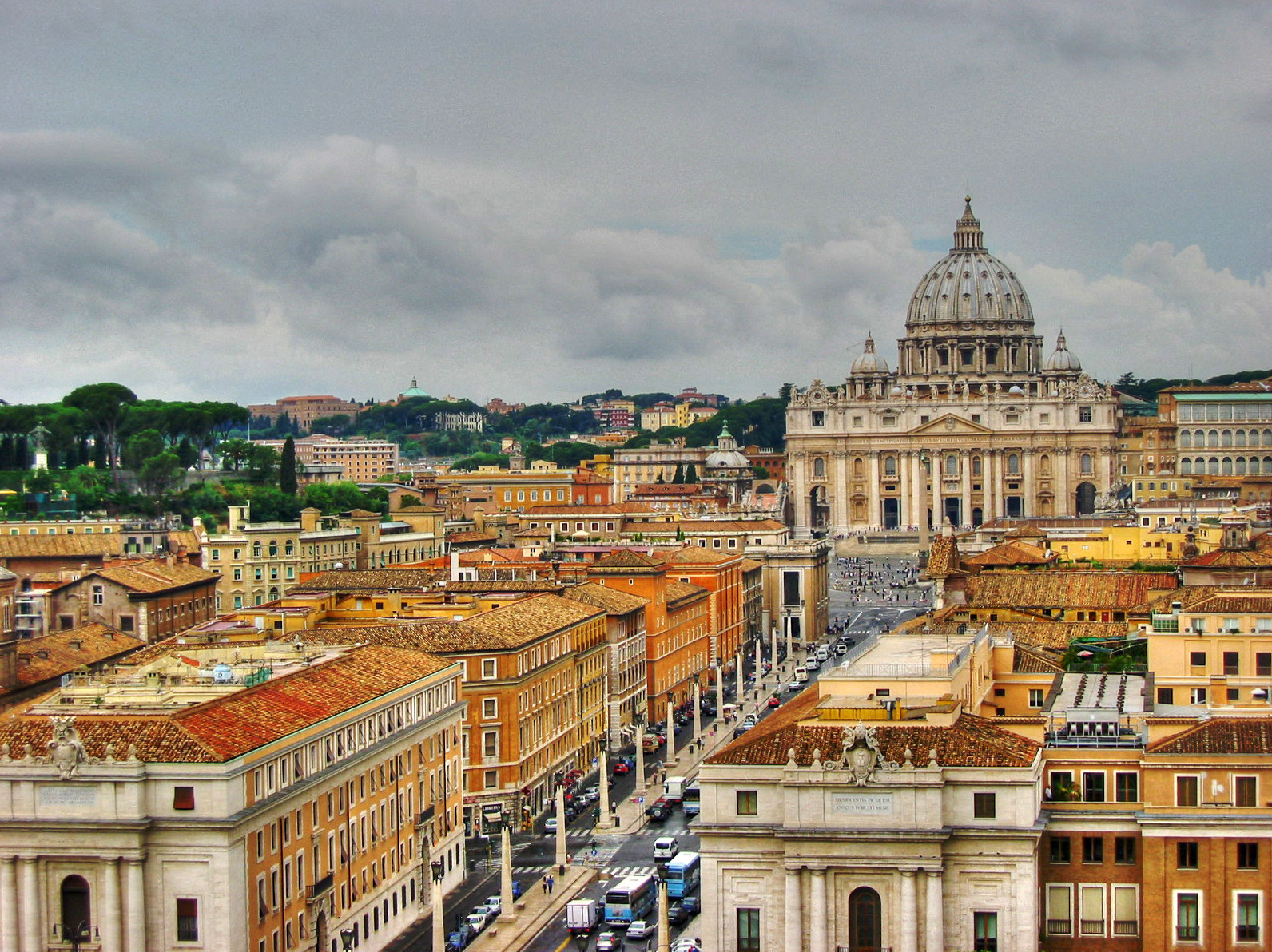
St. Peter's Basilica from Castel Sant'Angelo showing the dome rising behind Maderno's facade

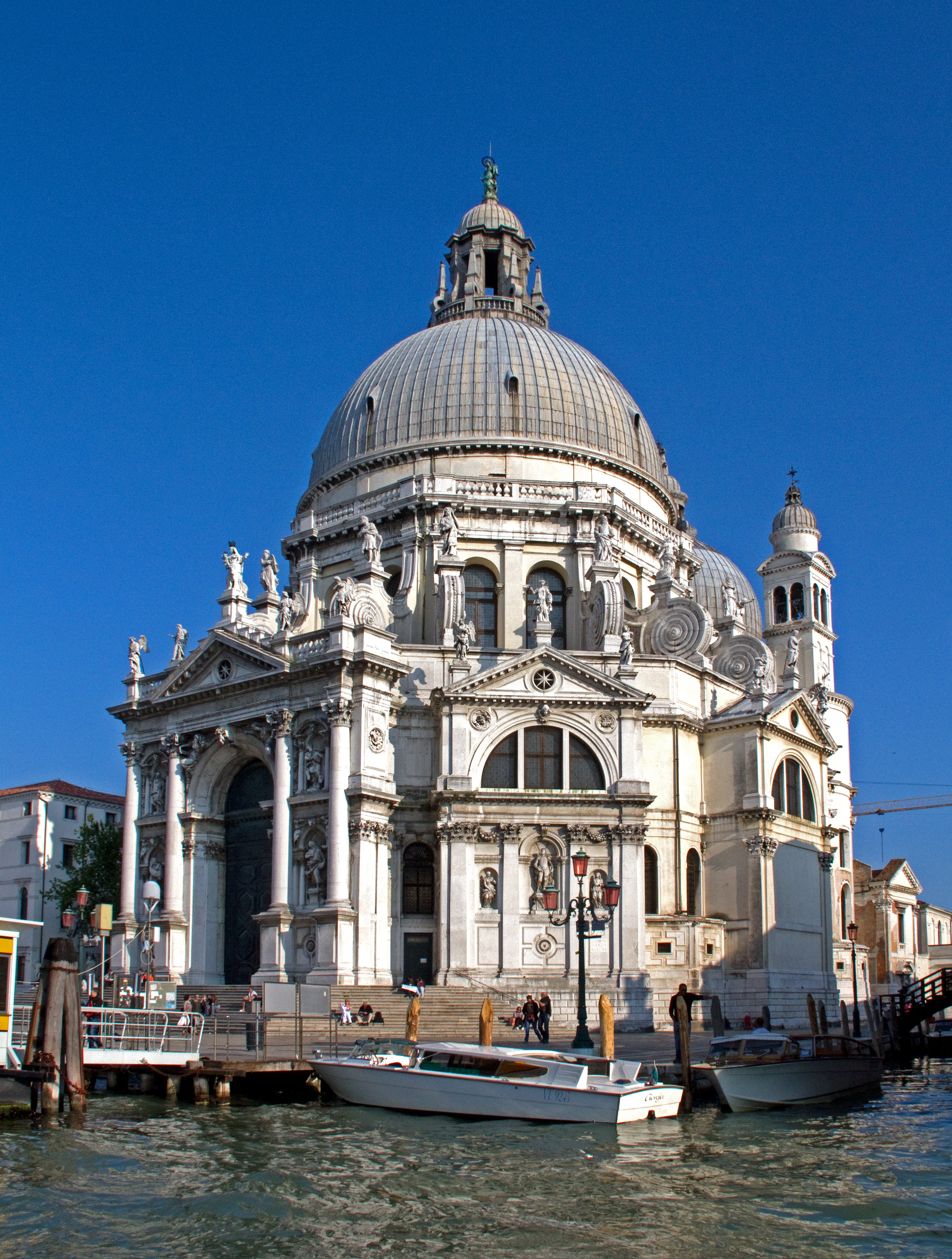
Santa Maria della Salute, Venice

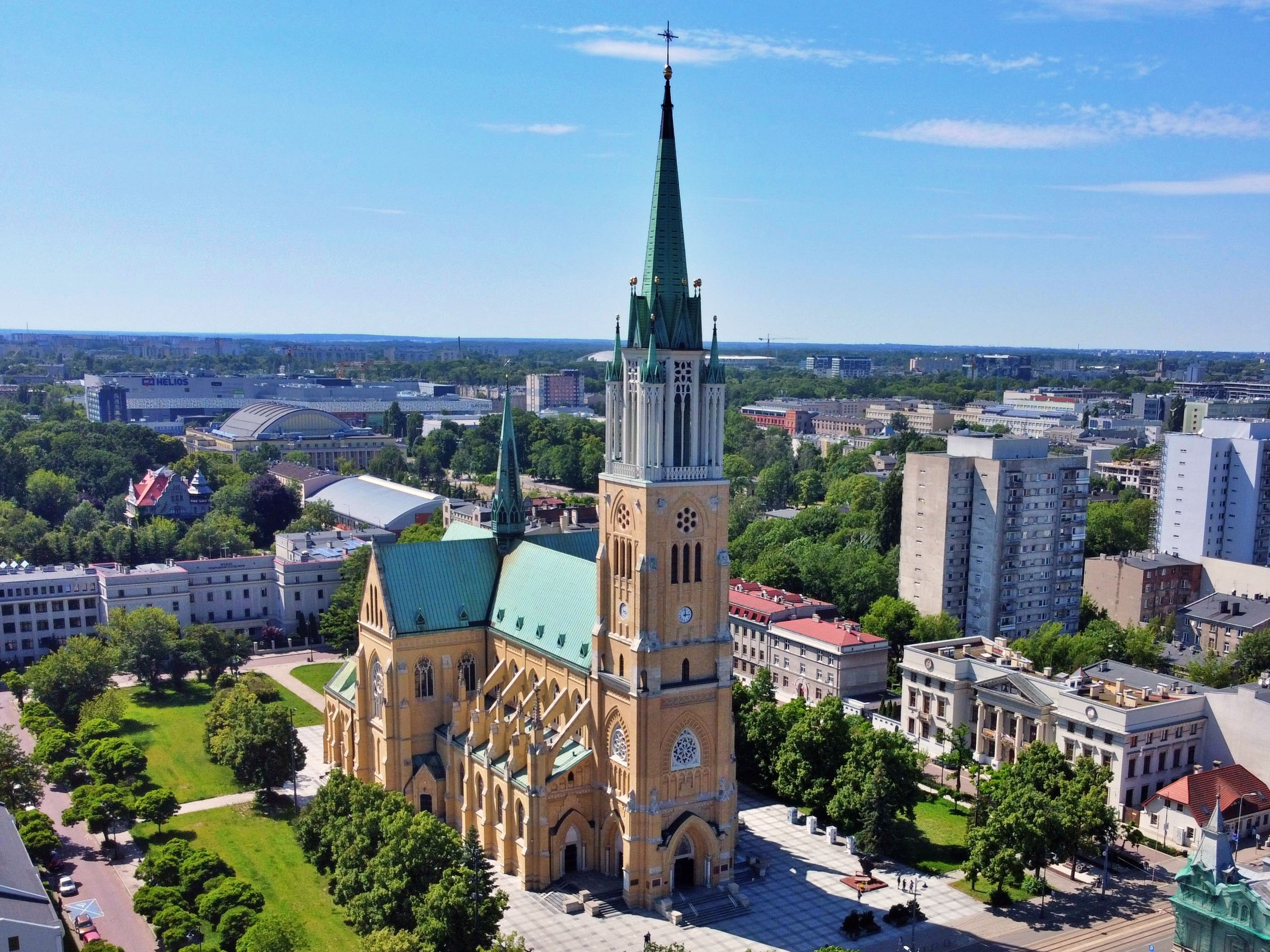
Cathedral Basilica of St. Stanislaus Kostka in Łódź, Poland

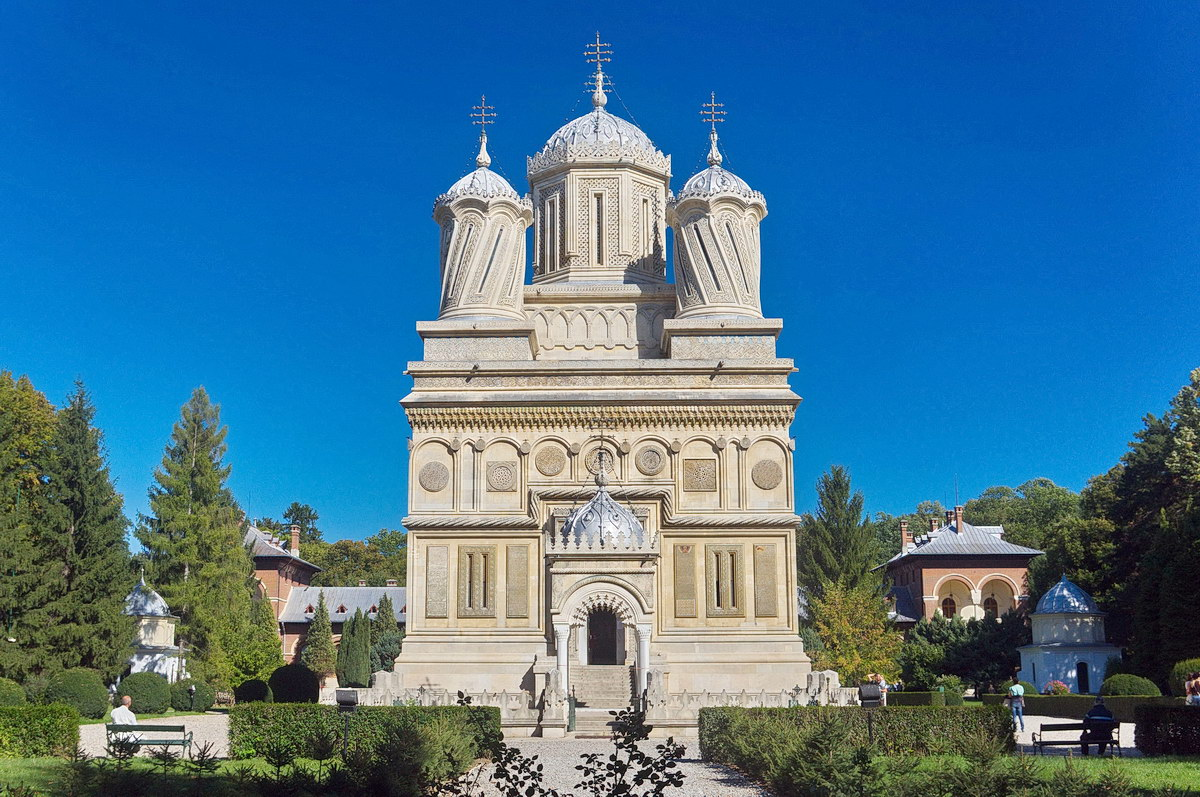
Curtea de Argeș Monastery in Romania

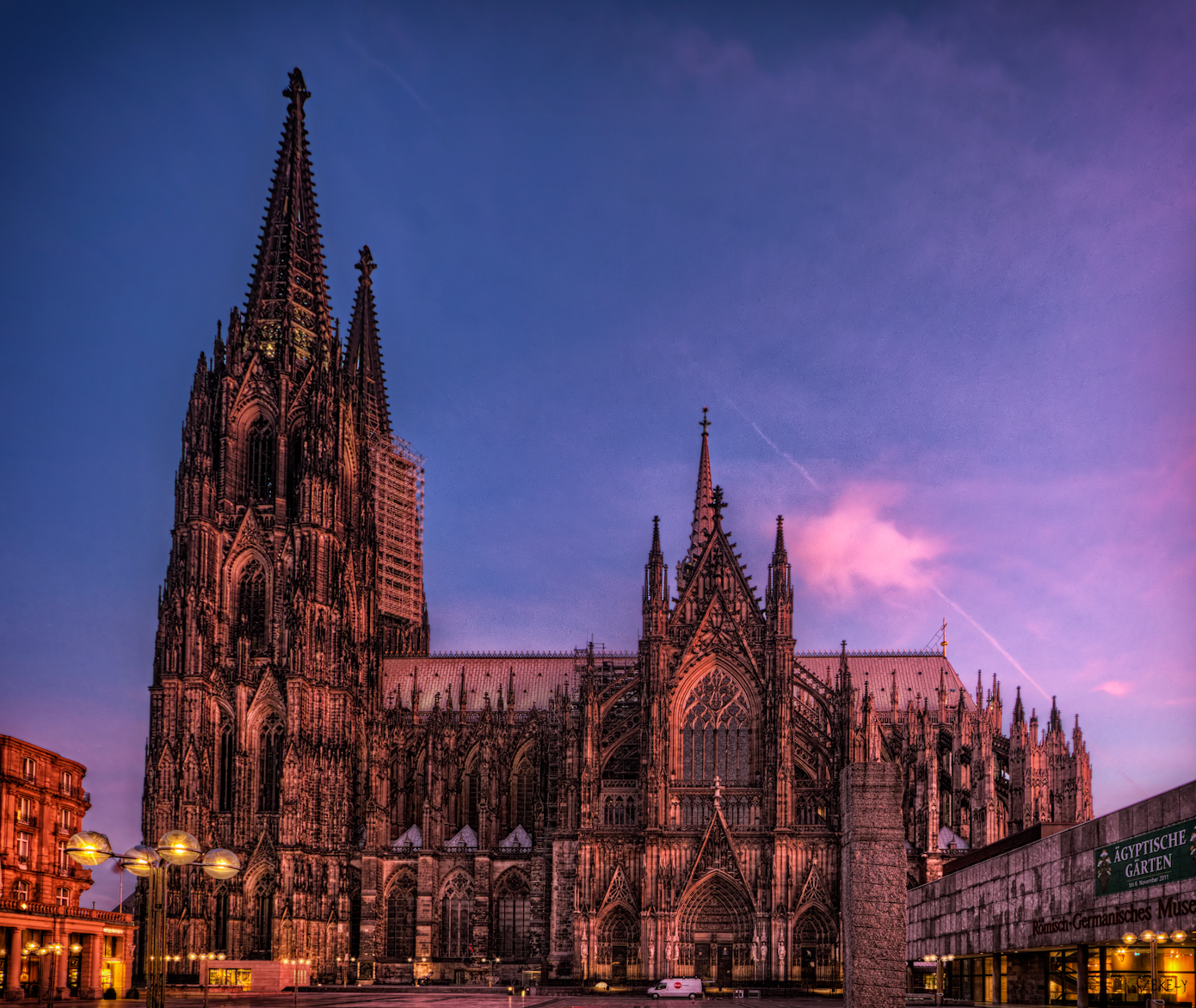
Cathedral of Sts. Peter and Mary in Cologne

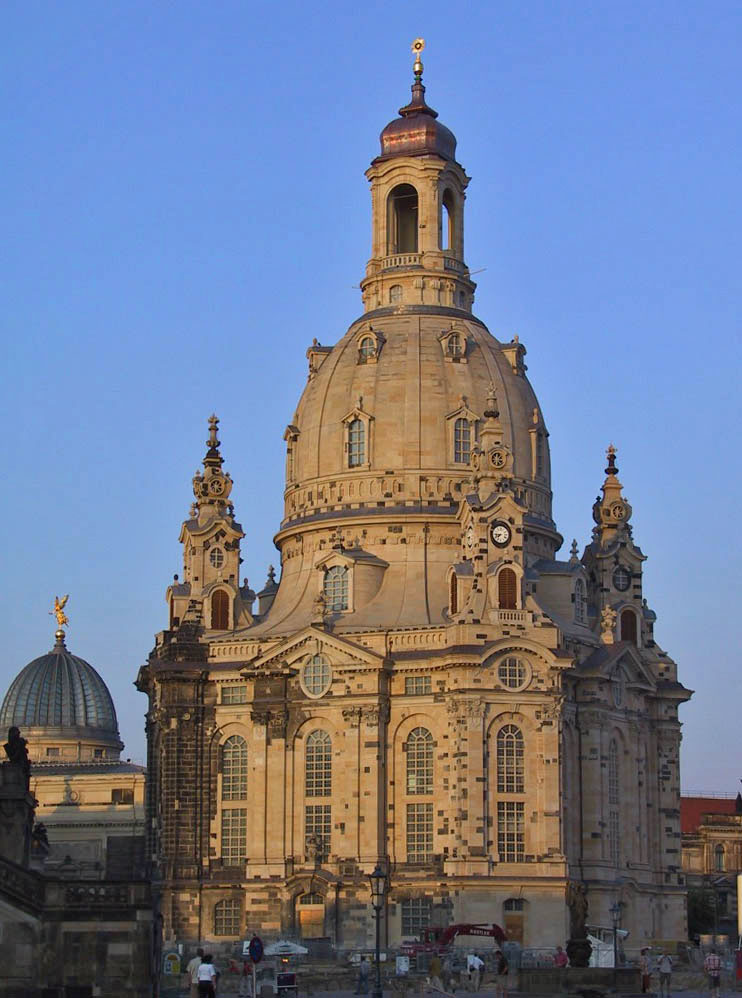
Frauenkirche, Lutheran church of Dresden

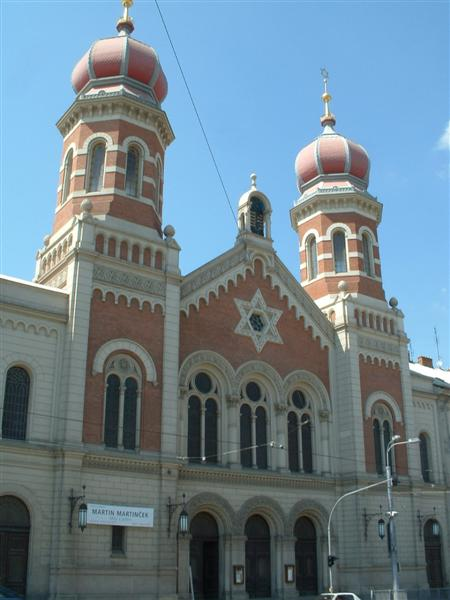
Great Synagogue in Plzeň

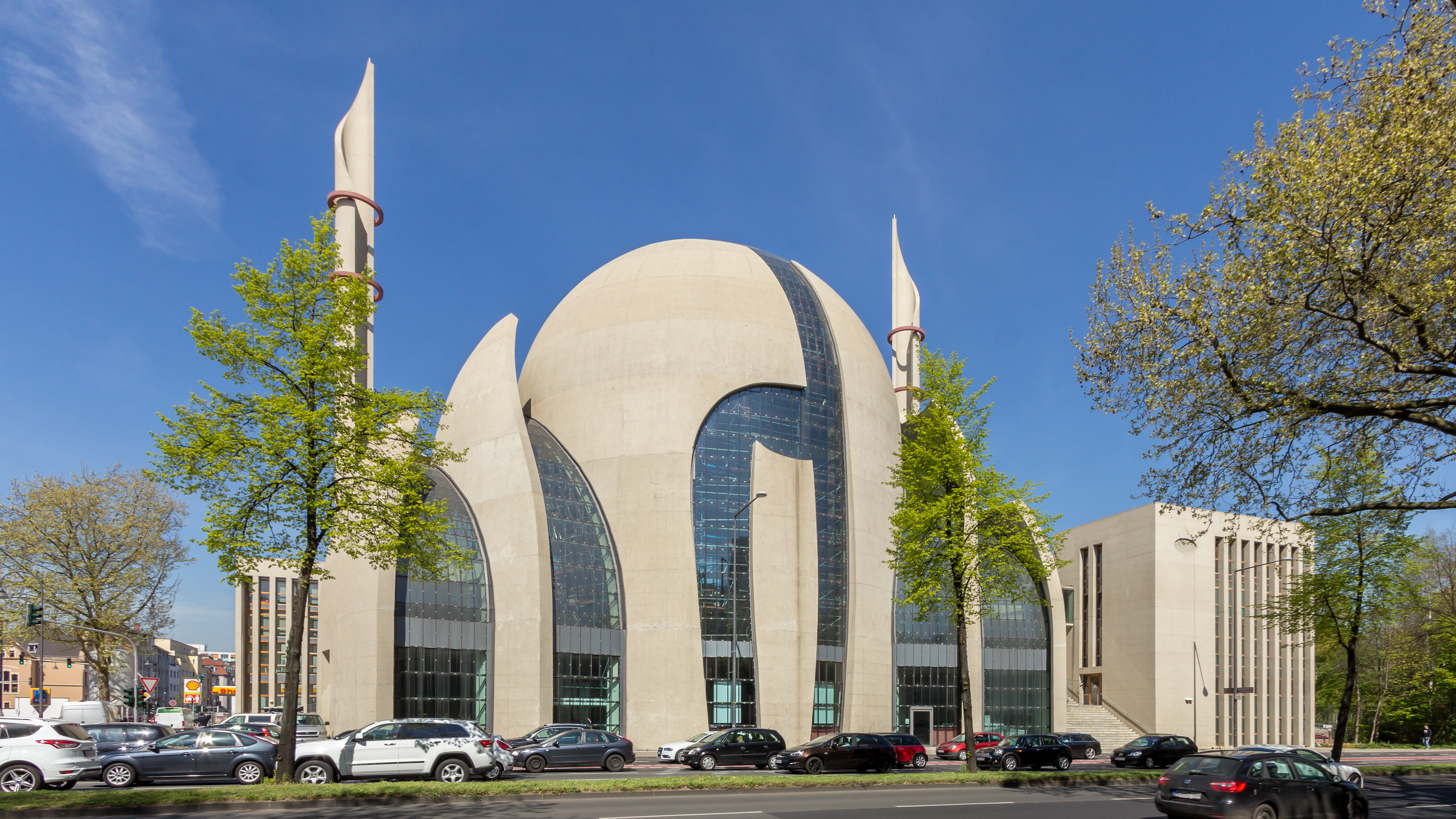
Central Mosque of Cologne

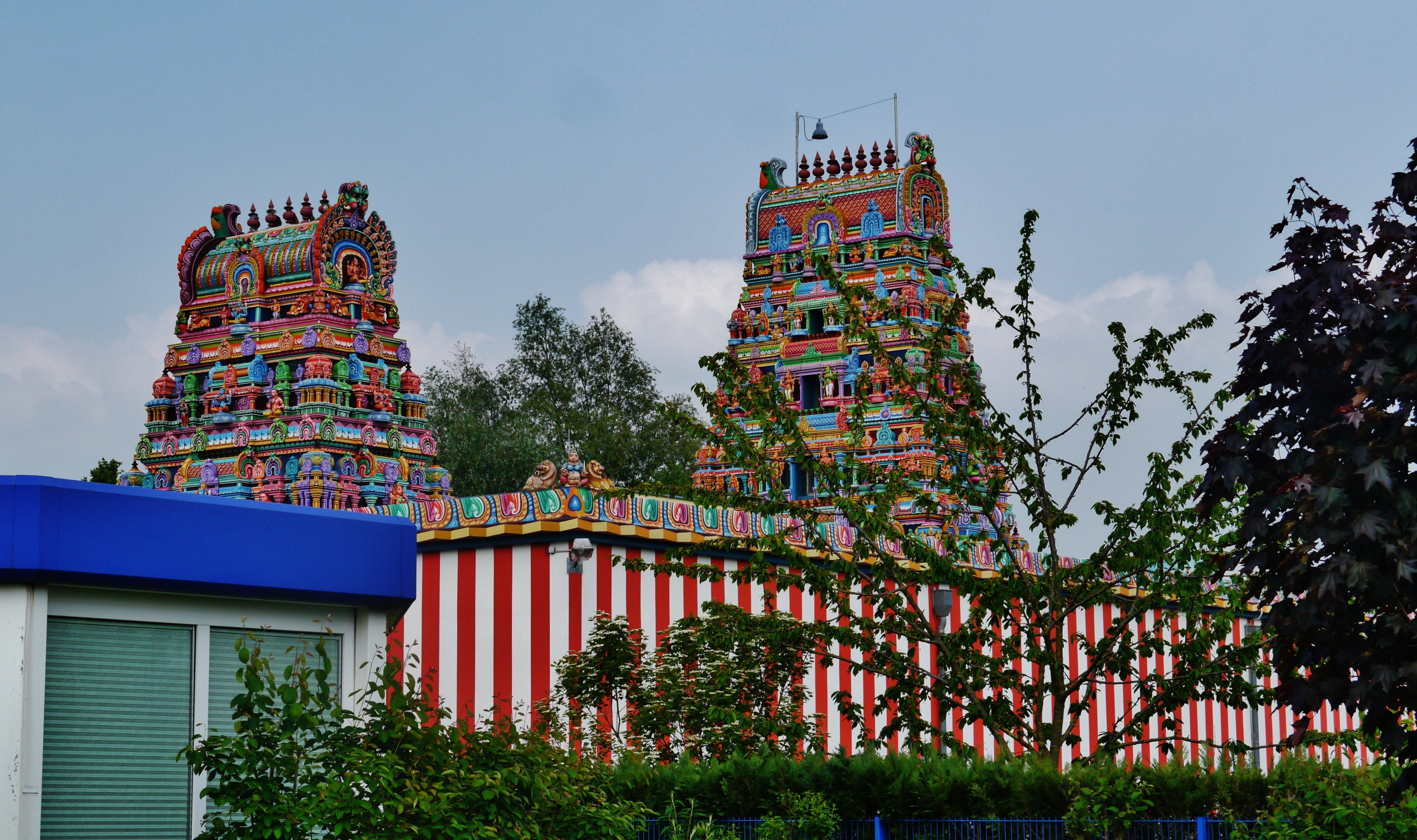
A Hindu temple in Germany (Hamm, Westphalia)

Religion in the European Union is diverse. The largest religion in the EU is Christianity, which accounted for 66.2% of EU population as of 2021. Smaller groups include those of Islam, Buddhism, Judaism, Hinduism, and some East Asian religions, most concentrated in Germany and France. Also present are revival movements of pre-Christianity European folk religions including Heathenism, Rodnovery, Romuva, and Druidry.

Over the last several decades, religious practice has been on the decline in a process of secularisation. Eurostat's Eurobarometer survey in 2010 showed that 20% of EU citizens don't believe there is any sort of spirit, god, or life force. Many countries have experienced falling church attendance and membership in recent years.

The countries with the most people reporting no belief in any sort of spirit, god, or higher power are France (40%), Czech Republic (37%), Sweden (34%), Netherlands (30%), Estonia (29%), Germany (27%), Belgium (27%) and Slovenia (26%). Some of the most religious countries are Poland ( reported 71.3% believers in 2021 census) and Malta ( reported 96.8% believers), Ireland (around 7 in 10 people identifying as religious in 2022 census), Greece (approximately 87.9% to 90% believers), Italy ( 88% declared themselves believers as of the 2005 Italian census, but this data might be old and thus inaccurate), Portugal ( 83% declared as believers in 2017 survey) and Romania (85.3% identifying as believers in 2021 census and 73.6% of the population identifying as Romanian Orthodox, although census accuracy is contested). The 2012 Romanian census had a high non-response rate, suggestively framed questions regarding belief and Christianity and was subject to political lobbying and pressure from the Romanian Christian Orthodox Church, which makes the accuracy of data questionable and its representativeness weak. In the case of Romania, church attendance is also significantly lower, which clashes directly with the statistics as per the 2021 census. Furthermore, a majority of Romanians opposed the public funding of the National Redemption Cathedral, Romania's biggest Orthodox Cathedral and the world's largest Orthodox church, with the project being seen as at best a gross misuse of public funds and at worst as a symbol of corruption and collusion between Church and State. Furthermore, many religious NGOs in Romania are founded by US-based institutions and organizations, particularly those tied to anti-abortion lobbying in Romania, which has turned public perception against religiously affiliated medical providers and help centers. Across the EU, belief is more common with older age and is higher amongst women, those with only basic education, and those "positioning themselves on the right of the political scale (57%)".

== Church and state ==
The EU is a secular body with a separation of church and state. There are no formal ties to any religion and no mention of any specific religion in any current or proposed treaty. Discussion over the European Constitution's draft texts and later the Treaty of Lisbon have included proposals to mention Christianity and/or God in the preamble of the document. This call has been supported by Christian religious leaders, most notably the Pope. However, the explicit inclusion of a link to religion faced opposition from secularists, and the final Constitution referred to Europe's "Religious and Humanist inheritance". A second attempt to include Christianity in the treaty was undertaken in 2007 with the drafting of the Treaty of Lisbon. Angela Merkel promised the Pope that she would use her influence during Germany's presidency to try to include a reference to Christianity and God in the treaty. This has provoked opposition, not least in the German press, and as this inclusion may have caused problems in reaching a final agreement, this attempt was given up. Of the Union's 27 states, only three have an official state religion, these being Denmark (Church of Denmark), Greece (Church of Greece), and Malta (Catholic Church). Some other churches have a close relationship with the state. Until 2000, the Church of Sweden was the state church of Sweden.

In the secularising EU, the Vatican has been vocal against a perceived "militant atheism". It based this on a number of events, for example: the rejection of religious references in the Constitution and Treaty of Lisbon, the rejection by Parliament of Rocco Buttiglione as Justice Commissioner in 2004, while at the same time Parliament approved Peter Mandelson (who is gay) as Trade Commissioner, and the legalisation of same-sex marriage in countries such as the Netherlands, Belgium, and Spain. The European Parliament has also been calling for same-sex marriages to be recognised across the EU. Meanwhile, states such as Latvia and Poland have rejected legislation designed to stop discrimination against homosexuals. This has been stated to be on religious grounds, with homosexual behaviour described as "unnatural", and the Catholic Church influencing public opinion. The difference of opinion between these countries and Brussels has been damaging relations.

Due to the rise of other religions, and some intolerance towards them, the EU Commission now regularly meets with different religious leaders. In November 2005, a delegation from the European Humanist Federation was invited to a meeting by Commissioner-President Barroso. This was the first time a humanist group had been consulted in this manner by the Commission. President Romano Prodi has refused such meetings, despite meeting various religious leaders, causing some resentment by humanists.

== Secularisation ==
Atheism and agnosticism have increased among the general population in Europe, with falling church attendance and membership in many countries. The countries where the most people reported no religious belief were France (40%), Czech Republic (37%), Sweden (34%), Netherlands (30%), Estonia (29%), Germany (27%), Belgium (27%) and Slovenia (26%). The most religious societies are those in Romania with around 15% non-believers (note accuracy of statistic is highly doubted as majority of population declined to answer question), Greece with 10% non-believers, and Malta with under 4% non-believers. Public perception of religion and God took a downwards turn across Europe as detailed in the most recent poll, whereby some of the highest ranking countries in terms of numbers of believers reported around 30% less believers in 2018 compared to the 2010 survey, such as Romania (92% to 64% believers and 55% 'highly religious' in 2018), Greece (79% to 59% believers in 2018), Poland (79% to 45% believers in 2018), Italy (74% to 29% believers in 2018) and Portugal (70% to 44% believers in 2018). Accordingly, contrasting these new numbers with the 2010 Eurobarometer Survey, there is a clear decline in the number of people who declare belief in God associated with Christianity, a downward trend that can be observed across all EU member states. Across the EU, in 2005 belief was higher among: the elderly, those with strict upbringings, those with the lowest levels of formal education, those leaning towards right-wing politics, and those more concerned with moral and ethical issues in science and technology over risk-benefit analysis.

In 2012, the highest ever number of births outside of marriage were recorded in the European Union, at 40%, with first-births out of wedlock and cohabitation figures being even higher. Seven EU countries recorded a majority of births outside of marriage – Estonia (59% in 2014), Bulgaria (58.8% in 2014), Slovenia (58.3% in 2014), France (57.4% in 2014), Sweden (54.4% in 2013), Belgium (52.3% in 2012), and Denmark (51.5% in 2013). These countries tend to be some of the less religious ones.

== Religiousness ==
Most EU countries have experienced a decline in church attendance, as well as a decline in the number of people professing belief. The 2010 Eurobarometer survey found that, on average, 51% of the citizens of the EU Member States state that they believe there is a god, 26% state that they believe there is some sort of spirit or life force and 20% state that they don't believe there is any sort of spirit, god or life force. 3% declined to answer. According to a recent study (Dogan, Mattei, Religious Beliefs in Europe: Factors of Accelerated Decline), 47% of French people declared themselves as agnostics in 2003. The situation of religion varies between countries in European Union. A decrease in religiousness and church attendance in Western Europe (especially in the Netherlands, Belgium, the United Kingdom, France, Germany, Finland, Norway, Sweden, Denmark, Spain, Portugal, Austria, Luxembourg and Czech Republic) has been noted and called "Post-Christian Europe". There has also been a sharp reduction in church attendance since 2005 in Poland, the most populous Eastern European EU member state, although with church attendance at 41.5% in 2009, it is still well above the single-digit figures that are so typical for Sunday service attendance in other EU countries.

Belief in God, spirit/life force, or no belief per country (Eurobarometer 2010)

Belief in God

Belief in spirit or life force

No belief at all

The following is a list of European countries ranked by religiosity, based on the rate of belief, according to the 2010 Eurobarometer survey. The 2010 Eurobarometer survey asked whether the person "believes there is a God", "believes there is some sort of spirit or life force" or "doesn't believe there is any sort of spirit, God or life force".

Eurobarometer survey 2010
Country	"I believe there is a God"	"I believe there is some sort of spirit or life force"	"I don't believe there is any sort of spirit, God or life force"	"Declined to answer"
Malta	94%	4%	2%	0%
Romania	92%	7%	1%	0%
Cyprus	88%	8%	3%	1%
Greece	79%	16%	4%	1%
Poland	79%	14%	5%	2%
Italy	74%	20%	6%	0%
(Republic of Ireland) Ireland	70%	20%	7%	3%
Portugal	70%	15%	12%	3%
Croatia	69%	22%	7%	2%
Slovakia	63%	23%	13%	1%
Spain	59%	20%	19%	2%
Lithuania	47%	37%	12%	4%
Luxembourg	46%	22%	24%	8%
Hungary	45%	34%	20%	1%
Austria	44%	38%	12%	6%
Germany	44%	25%	27%	4%
Latvia	38%	48%	11%	3%
United Kingdom	37%	33%	25%	5%
Belgium	37%	31%	27%	5%
Bulgaria	36%	43%	15%	6%
Finland	33%	42%	22%	3%
Slovenia	32%	36%	26%	6%
Denmark	28%	47%	24%	1%
Netherlands	28%	39%	30%	3%
France	27%	27%	40%	6%
Estonia	18%	50%	29%	3%
Sweden	18%	45%	34%	3%
Czech Republic	16%	44%	37%	3%
(European Union) EU28	51%	26%	20%	3%

== Religious affiliation ==
Largest (non-)religious group by EU member state (and other selected states) according to Eurobarometer survey 2010. More than 75% Catholic 50–75% Catholic No majority (Germany, Switzerland); relative Catholic majority (France) 50–75% Protestant More than 75% Orthodox 50–75% non-religious Relative non-religious majority More than 75% Muslim

Largest (non-)religious group by EU member state according to Eurobarometer survey 2019. (The U. K. subsequently left the European Union in 2020.) More than 75% Catholic 50–75% Catholic Relative Catholic majority 50–75% Protestant More than 75% Orthodox 50–75% non-religious Relative non-religious majority Protestant, Catholic, non-religious split (Germany)

Eurobarometer survey 2015 – Religious affiliation in the EU
Region	Catholic	Orthodox	Protestant	Other Christian	Total Christians	Non-Believer / Agnostic	Atheist	Muslim
Austria	66.5%	2.2%	7.2%	1.9%	77.8%	15.4%	4.1%	1.5%
Belgium	52.9%	1.6%	2.1%	4.1%	60.7%	17.1%	14.9%	5.2%
Bulgaria	1.6%	83.3%	0.1%	0.8%	85.8%	3.3%	2.3%	7.7%
Cyprus	1.3%	96.3%	0.0%	0.8%	98.4%	1.1%	0.5%	0.0%
Croatia	84.2%	2.3%	0.2%	0.0%	86.7%	6.6%	3.6%	1.3%
Czech Republic	27.1%	0.2%	1.0%	3.2%	31.5%	38.6%	25.8%	0.0%
Denmark	1.2%	2.2%	60.0%	8.8%	72.2%	12.5%	13.2%	0.8%
Estonia	2.8%	23.2%	9.0%	23.6%	58.6%	16.6%	22.2%	0.2%
Finland	0.1%	2.0%	69.7%	7.4%	79.2%	12.7%	6.5%	0.5%
France	47.8%	0.6%	1.8%	4.1%	54.3%	17.6%	22.8%	3.3%
Western Germany	37.1%	0.6%	36.5%	7.2%	81.4%	6.7%	7.4%	2.8%
Eastern Germany	7.1%	2.1%	19.2%	8.8%	37.2%	27.0%	34.1%	0.0%
Total Germany	31.1%	0.9%	33.1%	7.5%	72.6%	10.7%	12.8%	2.2%
Greece	0.4%	92.9%	0.1%	1.0%	94.4%	1.9%	1.6%	1.2%
Hungary	60.3%	1.1%	5.1%	8.1%	74.6%	18.5%	2.7%	0.3%
(Republic of Ireland) Ireland	80.7%	0.7%	1.8%	4.3%	87.5%	5.8%	4.6%	0.8%
Italy	77.8%	4.9%	0.6%	1.3%	84.6%	8.1%	4.3%	0.1%
Latvia	26.2%	24.0%	16.6%	9.9%	76.7%	17.3%	4.7%	1.2%
Lithuania	87.7%	3.6%	0.5%	0.9%	92.7%	4.2%	2.6%	0.0%
Luxembourg	64.8%	3.5%	3.6%	0.7%	69.8%	11.2%	10.3%	2.1%
Malta	95.0%	0.3%	0.2%	0.4%	95.9%	1.1%	3.0%	0.0%
Netherlands	21.9%	1.9%	17.8%	6.2%	47.8%	39.6%	9.2%	1.4%
Poland	90.7%	0.2%	1.0%	0.4%	92.3%	2.2%	3.6%	0.2%
Portugal	85.8%	0.2%	1.1%	1.6%	88.7%	8.2%	2.3%	0.1%
Romania	5.3%	89.9%	3.4%	1.0%	99.6%	0.2%	0.1%	0.1%
Slovakia	73.1%	2.2%	6.2%	2.2%	83.7%	5.0%	7.4%	0.0%
Slovenia	66.6%	0.9%	1.5%	0.2%	69.2%	6.6%	16.5%	2.7%
Spain	64.2%	1.4%	0.8%	2.2%	68.6%	17.0%	10.9%	0.6%
Sweden	1.6%	0.9%	36.5%	8.6%	47.6%	31.0%	19.0%	1.2%
(United Kingdom) Great Britain	12.7%	9.6%	14.7%	19.2%	56.2%	20.6%	11.8%	4.7%
(United Kingdom) Northern Ireland	33.3%	1.3%	14.7%	42.4%	91.7%	7.6%	2.4%	0.7%
(European Union) EU28	45.3%	9.6%	11.1%	5.6%	71.6%	13.6%	10.4%	1.8%

=== Modern Paganism and Ethnic Religions ===
Beyond the major established faiths, the European Union has seen the growth and institutionalization of Modern Paganism, specifically reconstructionist movements. These groups often identify as ethnic religions or "Native Faiths," seeking to revive pre-Christian traditions as a form of intangible cultural heritage. Independent sociological research and census data suggest a total population of approximately 4 to 5 million practitioners across Europe and the Anglosphere, with a long-term average annual growth rate of 8.3% between 1970 and 2010.

Institutional representation is primarily coordinated by the European Congress of Ethnic Religions (ECER). The ECER has engaged in formal advocacy with EU institutions, including the European Parliament, most notably through the 2023 Stockholm Declaration, which asserted that polytheistic traditions are integral to European heritage and deserve legal parity with other minority religions.

Within member states, legal recognition and affiliation numbers vary by region:

Northern and Western Europe: This region is characterized by Germanic and Celtic traditions. In the United Kingdom, the 2021 Census recorded 74,000 self-identified Pagans. In Iceland, the Ásatrúarfélagið reports a membership of over 5,000 individuals, or 1.4% of the population. In Denmark and Sweden, groups like Forn Siðr and Samfundet Forn Sed Sverige are state-recognized religious communities with legal rights to perform marriages.

Central and Eastern Europe: Focused on Baltic and Slavic revivals, this region sees high cultural visibility for "Native Faiths." In Lithuania, the 2021 census recorded over 5,000 adherents of the "Old Baltic Faith" (Romuva). Similar movements in Latvia (Dievturība) and Poland (Rodnoveria) maintain thousands of active members and strong ties to national identity and heritage protection.

Southern Europe: Defined by the Graeco-Roman heritage, Greece formally recognized the Hellenic Ethnic Religion as a "known religion" in 2017, which serves a core of several thousand practitioners and an estimated 100,000 cultural sympathizers. In Italy, sociologists at CESNUR estimate approximately 3,200 active practitioners of Roman Traditionalism (Religio Romana), represented by organizations such as the Associazione Tradizionale Pietas and the MTR.

== Diversity ==
It was estimated that the Union's Muslim population in 2009 was 13 million people. The country with the largest number of Muslims in western Europe is believed to be France with an estimated 6–7 million (though the French census does not ask religious questions) followed by Germany (4.5 million), the United Kingdom (2.7 million) and Italy (1.5 million). Aside from Turkey, the other possible future member to have a majority of Muslims is Albania, although other Balkan states like Bosnia (where Muslims enjoy a plurality), Montenegro and North Macedonia also have sizeable Muslim populations. Kosovo is also a Muslim majority state (but doesn't enjoy universal diplomatic recognition). A series of clashes and incidents connected to the religion have occurred in recent years, including: the murder of Theo van Gogh, the 2004 Madrid train bombings, the Jyllands-Posten Muhammad cartoons controversy, and the 7 July 2005 London bombings. In response to extremism, some figures, such as Justice Freedom & Security Commissioner Franco Frattini, have suggested creating a "European Islam" – a branch of the Islamic faith that is compatible with European values.

Judaism has had a long history in Europe going back to the Roman Empire. Prior to the Holocaust, the area of the European Union had a Jewish population of 5,375,000 but they were largely exterminated in Nazi concentration camps. In 2002, the EU had a Jewish population of barely over a million, including about 519,000 in France and about 273,500 in the United Kingdom. This can be compared with about 5.8 million Jews living in Israel. In view of the history of persecution of Jews in Europe, antisemitism remains a matter of attention within the EU.

Following the nationalization of the former British colonies in the 1960s and 1970s, many Hindus migrated to Europe from India and East Africa, often with British passports allowing them to pursue a future in Britain (which is no longer part of the EU). The Netherlands has also been a top destination for migrating Hindus, worldwide. Many Hindus who originally arrived in the country did not come directly from places like India, however. Hindus began arriving in the Netherlands in larger numbers beginning in the 1970s. This group came from Suriname, which was a Dutch colony up until 1975. Many more Hindus came in another wave of migration starting in the early 1980s spurred by the conflict in Sri Lanka that targeted Tamils. Hindus in Europe originate from different countries and practice their faith in different ways, depending on the group of Hinduism they belong to. As of 2021, there are greater than 450,000 Hindus in various EU member states.

== See also ==
- Religion in Europe
- Culture of the European Union
- Fundamental Rights Agency
- Holy See–European Union relations
- Christianity in Europe
- Judaism in Europe
- Islam in Europe
- List of religious populations
- Major world religions
