= Jørgen S. Nielsen =

Danish Islamic studies scholar (born 1946)

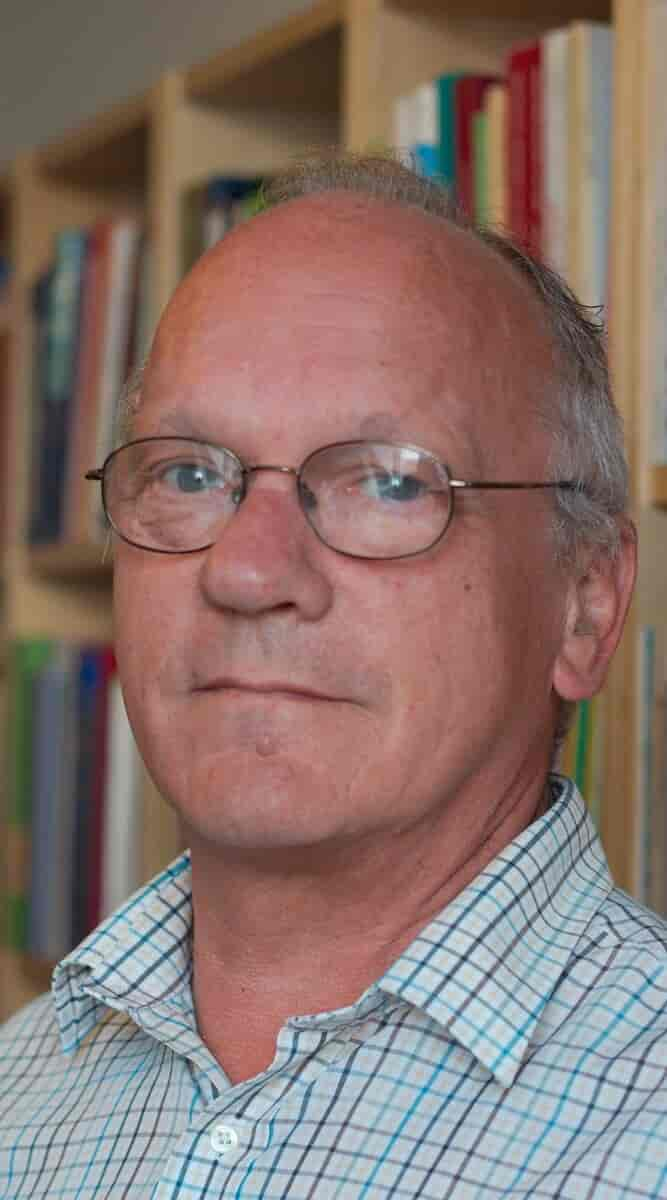
- Jørgen S. Nielsen in 2008
- Born: 18 September 1946 (age 80); Frederiksberg
- Occupation: Professor

Academic background
- Education: American University of Beirut
- Thesis: Secular justice in an Islamic state: Mazalim under the Bahri Mamluks, 622/1264 – 789/1387 (1978)

Academic work
- Discipline: Islamic studies

Jørgen Schøler Nielsen is a former Professor of Islamic Studies at the University of Copenhagen. In October 2007, he assumed a five-year research chair (funded by the Danish National Research Foundation) within the Faculty of Theology, where he leads the Centre for European Islamic Thought. He holds degrees in Arabic and Middle Eastern Studies from the School of Oriental and African Studies, London, and a PhD in Arab history from the American University of Beirut. He has concentrated his research on the situation of Muslims in Europe with related interests in the Islamic debate over religious pluralism and relations with the West. He has also worked as a consultant to the EU Presidency and the Council of Europe on religious minorities, and to the Danish, Swedish and British foreign ministries on Islam and Europe.

== Academic posts ==
- Lecturer at the Centre for the Study of Islam and Christian-Muslim Relations, Department of Theology, University of Birmingham from 1978 to 1988;
- Director of the Centre from 1988 to 2001.
- Professor of Islamic Studies at the University of Birmingham in 1996.
- Director of the Danish Institute in Damascus and Cultural Counsellor at the Danish Embassy from 2005 to 2007.

== Selected publications ==
- Muslim Participation in Europe, Edinburgh University Press (2013) ISBN 0-7486-4694-9
- Muslims in Western Europe, Edinburgh University Press (2005) ISBN 0-7486-1844-9
- Towards a European Islam, Palgrave Macmillan (1999) ISBN 0-312-22143-6

He is also General Editor of the series Muslim Minorities and Chief Editor of the Yearbook of Muslims in Europe, both from Brill Publishers.
