= Terry Nardin =

American political scientist and academic

- Born: Terry W. Nardin; 19 January 1942 (age 84)
- Education: Northwestern University

Terry Nardin is Professor and Head of Political Science at Yale-NUS College in Singapore, a department that he joined in 2006. He is on the Editorial Board of Ethics & International Affairs. He was named Distinguished Professor at University of Wisconsin–Milwaukee in 2003. He specialises in political theory, history of ideas and international political theory.

== Bibliography ==
- Nardin, Terry (1983). Law, Morality, and the Relations of States. Princeton University Press. ISBN 0-691-07663-4.
- ⸺ Mapel, David R., eds. (1992). Traditions of International Ethics. Cambridge University Press. ISBN 0-521-40458-4.
- ⸺, ed. (1996). The Ethics of War and Peace: Religious and Secular Perspectives. Princeton University Press. ISBN 9780691058405.
- ⸺ Mapel, David R., eds. (1999). International Society: Diverse Ethical Perspectives. Princeton University Press. ISBN 9780691049724.
- ⸺ (2001). The Philosophy of Michael Oakeshott. Penn State University Press. ISBN 978-0-271-02156-0.
- ⸺ Brown, Chris; Rengger, Nicholas J., eds. (2002). International Relations in Political Thought: Texts from the Ancient Greeks to the First World War. Cambridge University Press. ISBN 9780521575706.
- ⸺ (2006). Humanitarian Intervention. NYU Press. ISBN 9780814759110.
