= Religions by country =

Map of prevailing religion by country

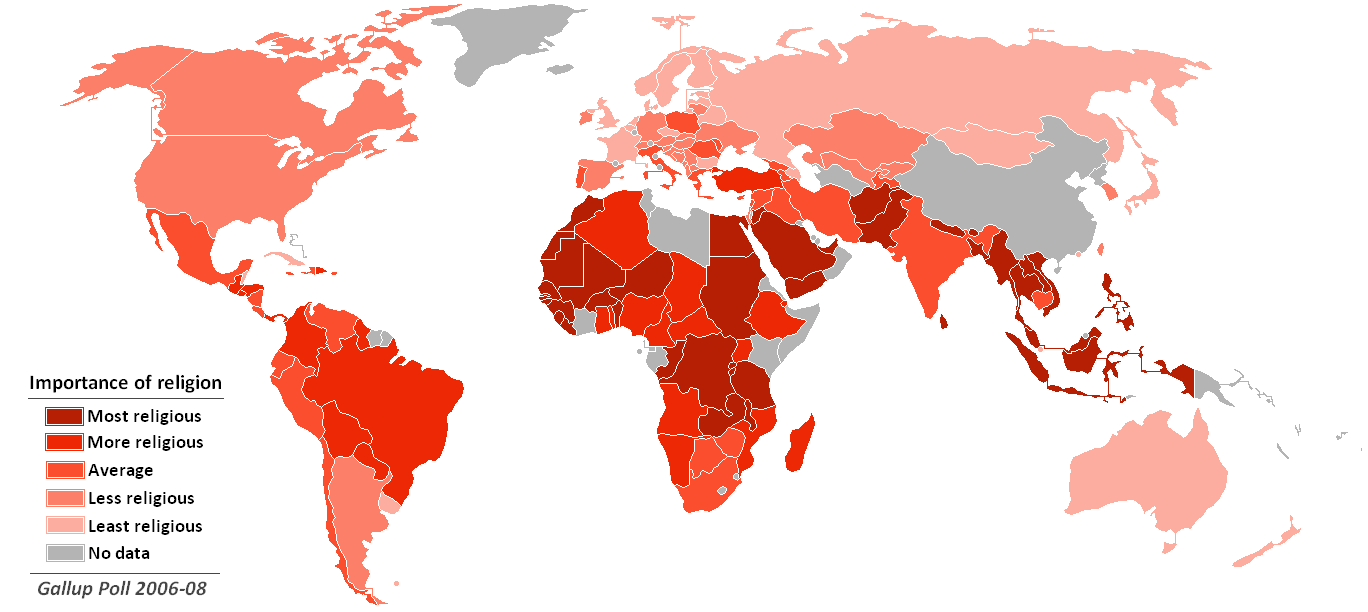
Map of relative importance of religion by country, based on a 2006–2008 worldwide survey by Gallup

Countries with a state religion: Christianity (unspecified) Protestantism Eastern Orthodoxy Catholicism / Islam (unspecified) Sunni Islam Shi'a Islam / Theravada Buddhism Vajrayana Buddhism

This is an overview of religion by country or territory in 2020 according to a 2025 Pew Research Center report. The article Religious information by country gives information from The World Factbook of the CIA and the U.S. Department of State.

== World ==
Religion	Population	Percentage
Christianity	2,268,860,000	28.8%
Islam	2,022,590,000	25.6%
Unaffiliated	1,905,360,000	24.2%
Hinduism	1,177,860,000	14.9%
Buddhism	324,190,000	4.1%
Other religions	172,170,000	2.2%
Judaism	14,780,000	<1%
World	7,885,810,000	100%

According to Pew's 2025 data, around 73.6% of the world adheres to at least one of the five major world religions, while the remaining 26.4% is religiously unaffiliated or practicing folk traditions, represented by 1,908,590,000 being unaffiliated at 24.2%, and 170,000,000 participating in other practices having a share of 2.2%.

== Africa ==
=== Central Africa ===
Country	Population	Christian		Muslim		Irreligion		Hindu		Buddhist		Other religion		Jewish	
Country	Population	Pop.	%	Pop.	%	Pop.	%	Pop.	%	Pop.	%	Pop.	%	Pop.	%
Angola	33,450,000	31,120,000	93.03	90,000	0.27	2,050,000	6.13	0	0.00	0	0.00	190,000	0.57	0	0.00
Cameroon	26,200,000	18,300,000	69.85	6,590,000	25.15	550,000	2.10	0	0.00	0	0.00	760,000	2.90	0	0.00
Central African Republic	5,020,000	4,560,000	90.84	310,000	6.18	20,000	0.40	0	0.00	0	0.00	130,000	2.59	0	0.00
Chad	17,220,000	6,700,000	38.91	9,710,000	56.39	540,000	3.14	0	0.00	0	0.00	270,000	1.57	0	0.00
(Democratic Republic of the Congo) DRC	96,022,500	92,400,000	96.23	1,220,000	1.27	1,130,000	1.18	30,000	0.03	0	0.00	1,240,000	1.29	2,500	0.00
Republic of the Congo	5,750,000	5,310,000	92.35	80,000	1.39	300,000	5.22	0	0.00	0	0.00	60,000	1.04	0	0.00
Equatorial Guinea	1,720,000	1,520,000	88.37	70,000	4.07	90,000	5.23	0	0.00	0	0.00	40,000	2.33	0	0.00
Gabon	2,310,000	1,940,000	83.98	200,000	8.66	130,000	5.63	0	0.0	0	0.00	40,000	1.73	0	0.00
(São Tomé and Príncipe) São Tome and Príncipe	216,000	180,000	83.33	6,000	2.78	20,000	9.26	0	0.00	0	0.00	10,000	4.63	0	0.00
Central Africa	187,908,500	162,030,000	86.23	18,276,000	9.73	4,830,000	2.57	30,000	0.02	0	0.00	2,740,000	1.46	2,500	0.00

=== Eastern Africa ===
Country	Population	Christian		Muslim		Irreligion		Hindu		Buddhist		Other religion		Jewish	
Country	Population	Pop.	%	Pop.	%	Pop.	%	Pop.	%	Pop.	%	Pop.	%	Pop.	%
Burundi	12,620,000	11,980,000	94.93	380,000	3.01	160,000	1.27	0	0.00	0	0.00	100,000	0.79	0	0.00
Comoros	800,000	5,000	0.62	790,000	98.75	0	0.00	0	0.00	0	0.00	000	0.00	0	0.00
Djibouti	1,110,000	10,000	0.90	1,080,000	97.30	10,000	0.90	0	0.00	0	0.00	2,670	0.24	1,780	0.16
Eritrea	3,290,000	1,540,000	46.81	1,700,000	51.67	30,000	0.91	0	0.00	0	0.00	20,000	0.61	0	0.00
Ethiopia	118,920,000	73,230,000	61.58	43,100,000	36.24	70,000	0.06	0	0.00	0	0.00	2,510,000	2.11	25,000	0.02
Kenya	52,220,000	44,730,000	85.66	5,710,000	10.93	840,000	1.61	70,000	0.13	N/A	N/A	870,000	1.67	N/A	N/A
Madagascar	28,950,000	21,490,000	74.23	340,000	1.17	6,460,000	22.31	20,000	0.07	0	0.00	650,000	2.25	0	0.00
Malawi	19,530,000	17,070,000	87.40	2,260,000	11.57	180,000	0.92	10,000	0.05	5,506	0.03	10,000	0.05	N/A	N/A
Mauritius	1,280,000	420,000	32.81	220,000	17.19	7,800	0.61	620,000	48.44	0	0.00	13,000	1.02	0	0.00
Mayotte	282,800	1,400	0.50	280,000	99.01	400	0.14	0	0.00	0	0.00	1,000	0.35	0	0.00
Mozambique	30,780,000	18,880,000	61.34	5,980,000	19.43	4,400,000	14.29	0	0.00	0	0.00	1,510,000	4.91	0	0.00
(Réunion) Reunion	860,000	750,000	87.21	40,000	4.65	20,000	2.33	40,000	4.65	1,700	0.20	10,000	1.16	0	0.00
Rwanda	13,070,000	12,680,000	97.02	240,000	1.84	130,000	0.99	0	0.00	0	0.00	20,000	0.15	0	0.00
Seychelles	120,000	110,000	91.67	1,038	0.86	1,890	1.58	1,890	1.58	0	0.00	540	0.45	0	0.00
Somalia	16,650,000	100	0.00	16,620,000	99.82	0	0.00	0	0.00	0	0.00	10,000	0.06	0	0.00
South Sudan	10,700,000	6,470,000	60.47	670,000	6.26	50,000	0.47	0	0.00	0	0.00	3,510,000	32.80	0	0.00
Tanzania	60,970,000	39,440,000	64.69	18,210,000	29.87	2,120,000	3.48	44,840	0.07	0	0.00	1,190,000	1.95	0	0.00
Uganda	44,460,000	39,010,000	87.74	5,070,000	11.40	40,000	0.09	100,260	0.23	0	0.00	330,000	0.74	0	0.00
Zambia	19,060,000	18,730,000	98.27	100,000	0.52	10,000	0.05	13,090	0.07	0	0.00	220,000	1.15	0	0.00
Zimbabwe	15,530,000	13,540,000	87.19	80,000	0.52	1,640,000	10.56	0	0.00	0	0.00	260,000	1.67	10,000	0.06
Eastern Africa	451,202,800	320,086,500	70.94	102,871,038	22.80	16,170,090	3.58	920,080	0.20	7,206	0.00	11,247,210	2.49	36,780	0.01

=== Northern Africa ===
Country	Population	Christian		Muslim		Irreligion		Hindu		Buddhist		Other religion		Jewish	
Country	Population	Pop.	%	Pop.	%	Pop.	%	Pop.	%	Pop.	%	Pop.	%	Pop.	%
Algeria	44,041,000	130,000	0.30	43,330,000	98.39	560,000	1.27	0	0.00	0	0.00	20,000	0.05	1,000	0.00
Egypt	109,311,000	5,270,000	4.82	104,040,000	95.18	0	0.00	0	0.00	0	0.00	0	0.00	1,000	0.00
Libya	7,042,720	40,000	0.57	6,970,000	98.97	12,720	0.18	0	0.00	20,000	0.28	0	0.00	0	0.00
Morocco	36,592,200	30,000	0.08	36,470,000	99.67	50,000	0.14	0	0.00	0	0.00	40,000	0.11	2,200	0.01
Sudan	46,780,000	230,000	0.49	46,250,000	98.87	260,000	0.56	0	0.00	0	0.00	40,000	0.09	0	0.00
Tunisia	11,971,100	30,000	0.25	11,890,000	99.32	50,000	0.42	0	0.00	0	0.00	0	0.00	1,100	0.01
Northern Africa	255,738,020	5,730,000	2.24	248,950,000	97.35	932,720	0.36	0	0.00	20,000	0.01	100,000	0.04	5,300	0.00

=== Southern Africa ===
Country	Population	Christian		Muslim		Irreligion		Hindu		Buddhist		Other religion		Jewish	
Country	Population	Pop.	%	Pop.	%	Pop.	%	Pop.	%	Pop.	%	Pop.	%	Pop.	%
Botswana	237,000	1,950,000	82.28	8,040	0.35	350,000	14.77	6,030	0.25	0	0.00	50,000	2.11	0	0.00
Eswatini	1,190,000	1,110,000	93.28	2,400	0.20	70,000	5.88	1,190	0.10	0	0.00	16,660	1.40	0	0.00
Lesotho	2,240,000	2,180,000	97.32	3,000	0.13	40,000	1.79	0	0.00	0	0.00	20,000	0.89	0	0.00
Namibia	2,730,000	2,470,000	90.48	6,840	0.25	150,000	5.49	0	0.00	0	0.00	100,000	3.66	0	0.00
South Africa	60,560,000	51,630,000	85.25	970,000	1.60	1,890,000	3.12	640,000	1.06	20,000	0.03	5,360,000	8.85	40,000	0.07
Southern Africa	66,957,000	59,340,000	88.62	990,280	1.48	2,500,000	3.73	647,220	0.97	20,000	0.03	5,546,660	8.28	40,000	0.06

=== Western Africa ===
Country	Population	Christian		Muslim		Irreligion		Hindu		Buddhist		Other religion		Jewish	
Country	Population	Pop.	%	Pop.	%	Pop.	%	Pop.	%	Pop.	%	Pop.	%	Pop.	%
Benin	13,070,000	6,960,000	53.25	4,100,000	31.37	640,000	4.90	0	0.00	0	0.00	1,370,000	10.48		
Burkina Faso	21,480,000	6,010,000	27.98	14,480,000	67.41	120,000	0.56					860,000	4.00		
Cape Verde	510,000	400,000	78.43	800	0.16	110,000	21.57	0	0.00	0	0.00	8,500	1.67	0	0.00
(The Gambia) Gambia	2,520,000	70,000	2.78	2,440,000	96.83	0	0.00	0	0.00	0	0.00	1,730	0.07	0	0.00
Ghana	34,237,620	24,411,423	71.30	6,813,286	19.90	338,720	0.99					2,371,030	6.93		
Guinea	13,370,000	1,570,000	11.74	11,610,000	86.84	180,000	1.35	0	0.00	10,000	0.07	10,000	0.07	0	0.00
(Guinea-Bissau) Guinea Bissau	2,010,000	440,000	21.89	1,130,000	56.22	230,000	11.44	0	0.00	0	0.00	220,000	10.95	0	0.00
Ivory Coast	29,389,150	11,696,880	39.80	12,490,390	42.50	3,703,033	12.60					852,175	2.90		
Liberia	5,150,000	4,390,000	85.24	660,000	12.82	50,000	0.97	0	0.00	0	0.00	50,000	0.97	0	0.00
Mali	21,710,000	560,000	2.58	20,440,000	94.15	550,000	2.53	0	0.00	0	0.00	170,000	0.78	0	0.00
Mauritania	4,600,000	10,000	0.22	4,560,000	99.13	0	0.00	0	0.00	0	0.00	20,000	0.43	0	0.00
Niger	23,720,000	130,000	0.55	23,270,000	98.10	290,000	1.22	0	0.00	0	0.00	20,000	0.08	0	0.00
Nigeria	214,000,000	92,770,000	43.35	119,980,000	56.07	810,000	0.38	0	0.00	10,000	0.00	430,000	0.20	0	0.00
Senegal	17,312,350	400,000	2.31	16,380,000	94.61	35,490	0.20	0	0.00	0	0.00	496,860	2.87	0	0.00
Sierra Leone	7,910,000	1,570,000	19.85	6,340,000	80.15	5,870	0.07	0	0.00	0	0.00	46,960	0.59	0	0.00
Saint Helena	4,000	3,860	96.50	140	03.50	0	0.00	0	0.00	0	0.00	0	0.00	0	0.00
Togo	8,670,000	4,930,000	56.86	1,400,000	16.15	690,000	7.96	0	0.00	0	0.00	1,640,000	18.92	0	0.00
Western Africa	304,264,000	123,748,360	40.67	162,347,970	53.36	5,034,372	1.64	0	0.00	10,000	0.00	12,789,880	4.20	219,438	0.07

== Americas ==
=== Caribbean ===
Country	Population	Christian		Muslim		Irreligion		Hindu		Buddhist		Folk religion		Other religion		Jewish	
Country	Population	Pop.	%	Pop.	%	Pop.	%	Pop.	%	Pop.	%	Pop.	%	Pop.	%	Pop.	%
Anguilla	20,000	18,120	90.60	60	0.30	800	4.00	80	0.40	0	0.00	580	2.90	320	1.60	20	0.10
Antigua and Barbuda	90,000	83,700	93.00	540	0.60	1,530	1.70	180	0.20	0	0.00	3,240	3.60	900	1.00	0	0.00
Aruba	110,670	101,090	91.90	220	0.20	6,600	6.00	0	0.00	110	0.10	1,430	1.30	110	0.10	440	0.40
(The Bahamas) Bahamas	340,550	326,400	96.00	340	0.10	10,540	3.10	0	0.00	0	0.00	1,020	0.30	1,020	0.30	0	0.00
Barbados	270,000	257,040	95.20	2,700	1.00	5,130	1.90	1,080	0.40	0	0.00	0	0.00	3,780	1.40	0	0.00
Bonaire	22,573	18,960	86.0	N/A	N/A	2,710	12.0	N/A	N/A	N/A	N/A	N/A	N/A	900	4.0	N/A	N/A
Cayman Islands	60,000	50,100	83.50	240	0.40	5,640	9.40	540	0.90	0	0.00	2,700	4.50	360	0.60	480	0.80
Cuba	10,985,974	6,503,697	59.20	0	0.00	2,589,800	23.00	22,520	0.20	0	0.00	1,959,240	17.40	0	0.00	0	0.00
Curaçao	155,000	134,230	86.6	N/A	N/A	15,500	10.0	N/A	N/A	N/A	N/A	N/A	N/A	6,820	4.4	N/A	N/A
Dominica	70,000	66,080	94.40	70	0.10	350	0.50	0	0.00	70	0.10	2,100	3.00	1,190	1.70	0	0.00
Dominican Republic	10,790,744	9,654,254	88.00	0	0.00	1,082,370	10.90	0	0.00	0	0.00	89,370	0.90	9,930	0.10	0	0.00
Grenada	100,000	96,600	96.60	300	0.30	1,000	1.00	700	0.70	0	0.00	1,300	1.30	200	0.20	0	0.00
Guadeloupe	460,000	441,140	95.90	1,840	0.40	11,500	2.50	2,300	0.50	0	0.00	1,840	0.40	1,840	0.40	0	0.00
Haiti	11,470,261	9,967,656	86.90	0	0.00	1,058,940	10.60	0	0.00	0	0.00	219,780	2.20	29,970	0.30	0	0.00
Jamaica	2,740,000	2,115,280	77.20	0	0.00	471,280	17.20	0	0.00	0	0.00	123,300	4.50	27,400	1.00	0	0.00
Martinique	410,000	395,650	96.50	820	0.20	9,430	2.30	820	0.20	0	0.00	820	0.20	2,460	0.60	0	0.00
Montserrat	5,000	4,675	93.50	0	0.00	240	4.80	5	0.10	0	0.00	10	0.20	75	1.50	0	0.00
Puerto Rico	3,285,870	2,924,400	89.00	0	0.00	262,870	8.00	0	0.00	0	0.00	0	0.00	98,580	3.00	0	0.00
(Saba (island)) Saba	1,911	1452	76.0	115	6.0	344	18.0	N/A	N/A	N/A	N/A	N/A	N/A	N/A	N/A	N/A	N/A
Saint Kitts and Nevis	50,000	47,300	94.60	150	0.30	800	1.60	750	1.50	0	0.00	650	1.30	400	0.80	0	0.00
Saint Lucia	170,000	154,870	91.10	170	0.10	10,200	6.00	510	0.30	0	0.00	850	0.50	3,400	2.00	0	0.00
Saint Vincent and the Grenadines	110,000	97,570	88.70	1,650	1.50	2,750	2.50	3,740	3.40	0	0.00	2,200	2.00	2,200	2.00	0	0.00
Sint Eustatius	3,240	2,757	85.1	N/A	N/A	483	14.9	N/A	N/A	N/A	N/A	N/A	N/A	N/A	N/A	N/A	N/A
Sint Maarten	41,486	34,060	82.1	N/A	N/A	3,277	7.9	2,160	5.2	N/A	N/A	N/A	N/A	1,990	4.8	N/A	N/A
Trinidad and Tobago	1,340,000	883,060	65.90	79,060	5.90	25,460	1.90	304,180	22.70	4,020	0.30	25,460	1.90	18,760	1.40	0	0.00
Turks and Caicos Islands	40,000	36,840	92.10	0	0.00	1,840	4.60	0	0.00	0	0.00	1,080	2.70	240	0.60	0	0.00
British Virgin Islands	20,000	16,900	84.50	240	1.20	780	3.90	240	1.20	0	0.00	1,680	8.40	160	0.80	0	0.00
(United States Virgin Islands) U.S. Virgin Islands	87,150	82,620	94.80	90	0.10	3,225	3.70	0	0.00	0	0.00	0	0.00	660	0.60	330	0.30
Total	41,645,000	33,196,375	79.71%	88,910	0.21%	5,378,900	12.92%	338,485	0.81%	16,450	0.04%	2,471,050	5.93%	109,725	0.26%	1,870	0.00%

=== Central America ===
Country	Population	Christian		Muslim		Irreligion		Hindu		Buddhist		Folk religion		Other religion		Jewish	
Country	Population	Pop.	%	Pop.	%	Pop.	%	Pop.	%	Pop.	%	Pop.	%	Pop.	%	Pop.	%
Belize	310,000	271,560	87.60	310	0.10	27,590	8.90	620	0.20	1,550	0.50	4,650	1.50	310	0.10	3,100	1.00
Costa Rica	5,044,197	4,585,175	90.90	0	0.00	368,140	7.90	0	0.00	0	0.00	38,280	0.80	13,980	0.30	0	0.00
El Salvador	6,602,370	5,823,290	88.20	0	0.00	680,900	11.00	0	0.00	0	0.00	30,950	0.50	18,570	0.30	0	0.00
Guatemala	17,980,803	17,117,724	95.20	0	0.00	589,990	4.10	0	0.00	0	0.00	86,340	0.60	10,000	0.07	0	0.00
Honduras	9,571,352	8,384,504	87.60	7,600	0.10	798,000	10.50	0	0.00	7,600	0.10	83,600	1.10	45,600	0.60	0	0.00
Nicaragua	6,359,689	5,456,613	85.80	0	0.00	723,750	12.50	0	0.00	0	0.00	81,060	1.40	5,790	0.10	0	0.00
Panama	3,520,000	3,273,600	93.00	24,640	0.70	168,960	4.80	0	0.00	7,040	0.20	14,080	0.40	14,080	0.40	14,080	0.40
Total	41,523,235	37,957,685	89.94%	32,550	0.02%	2,688,070	5.57%	620	0.00%	16,190	0.01%	407,960	0.26%	128,330	0.08%	87,180	0.06%

=== North America ===
Country	Population	Christian		Muslim		Irreligion		Hindu		Buddhist		Folk religion		Other religion		Jewish	
Country	Population	Pop.	%	Pop.	%	Pop.	%	Pop.	%	Pop.	%	Pop.	%	Pop.	%	Pop.	%
Bermuda	60,000	45,000	75.00	660	1.10	11,640	19.40	0	0.00	300	0.50	1,800	3.00	480	0.80	180	0.30
Canada	40,297,761	21,372,106	53.3	1,964,790	4.9	12,577,475	34.6	922,248	2.3	402,977	1.0	80,690	0.2	1,082,639	2.7	360,879	0.9
Greenland	60,000	57,660	96.10	0	0.00	1,500	2.50	0	0.00	0	0.00	480	0.80	360	0.60	0	0.00
Mexico	129,875,529	118,576,357	91.3	N/A	N/A	10,585,178	8.4	N/A	N/A	N/A	N/A	N/A	N/A	378,043	0.3	N/A	N/A
Saint Pierre and Miquelon	6,000	5,682	94.70	12	0.20	228	3.80	0	0.00	0	0.00	0	0.00	78	1.30	0	0.00
United States	339,996,564	262,817,343	77.30	3,059,969	0.90	55,759,436	16.40	2,039,979	0.60	4,079,958	1.20	679,993	0.20	2,039,979	0.60	6,119,938	1.80
Total	476,526,000	406,609,682	77.38%	3,908,512	1.02%	63,978,428	17.12%	2,338,560	0.68%	3,997,020	1.16%	1,031,280	0.30%	2,169,378	0.63%	5,927,220	1.72%

=== South America ===
Country	Population	Christian		Muslim		Irreligion		Hindu		Buddhist		Other religion		Jewish	
Country	Population	Pop.	%	Pop.	%	Pop.	%	Pop.	%	Pop.	%	Pop.	%	Pop.	%
Argentina	45,180,000	39,970,000	88.47	420,000	0.93	4,170,000	9.23	0	0.00	10,000	0.02	440,000	0.97	170,000	0.38
Bolivia	11,820,000	10,510,000	88.92	0	0.00	1,130,000	9.56	0	0.00	0	0.00	180,000	1.52	0	0.00
Brazil	208,670,000	168,300,000	80.65	40,000	0.02	28,110,000	13.47	0	0.00	220,000	0.11	11,910,000	5.71	90,000	0.04
Chile	19,380,000	13,240,000	68.32	10,000	0.05	5,860,000	30.24	0	0.00	10,000	0.05	240,000	1.24	20,000	0.10
Colombia	50,630,000	43,670,000	86.25	0	0.00	5,030,000	9.93	0	0.00	0	0.00	1,920,000	3.79	10,000	0.02
Ecuador	17,530,000	15,530,000	88.59	0	0.00	1,470,000	8.39	0	0.00	0	0.00	530,000	3.02	0	0.00
Falkland Islands	3,000	2,016	67.20	9	0.30	945	31.50	0	0.00	6	0.20	24	0.80	0	0.80
French Guiana	283,570	240,000	84.64	2,070	0.73	7,820	2.76	3,680	1.30	0	0.00	30,000	10.58	0	0.00
Guyana	800,000	530,000	66.25	50,000	6.25	20,000	2.50	190,000	23.75	0	0.00	10,000	1.25	0	0.00
Paraguay	6,600,000	6,180,000	93.64	0	0.00	280,000	4.24	0	0.00	0	0.00	140,000	2.12	0	0.00
Peru	32,830,000	31,030,000	94.52	0	0.00	1,680,000	5.12	0	0.00	10,000	0.03	110,000	0.34	0	0.00
Suriname	614,160	320,000	52.10	80,000	13.03	50,000	8.14	140,000	22.80	3,120	0.51	20,000	3.26	1,040	0.17
Uruguay	3,400,000	1,510,000	44.41	0	0.00	1,780,000	52.35	0	0.00	0	0.00	90,000	2.65	20,000	0.59
Venezuela	28,430,000	25,060,000	88.15	10,000	0.04	2,770,000	9.74	0	0.00	0	0.00	590,000	2.08	0	0.00
Total	426,170,730	355,992,016	83.53%	472,210	0.11%	52,358,765	12.29%	333,680	0.08%	253,126	0.06%	16,210,024	3.80%	311,040	0.07%

== Asia ==
=== Eastern Asia ===
Country	Population	Christian		Muslim		Irreligion		Hindu		Buddhist		Folk religion		Other religion		Jewish	
Country	Population	Pop.	%	Pop.	%	Pop.	%	Pop.	%	Pop.	%	Pop.	%	Pop.	%	Pop.	%
(mainland China) China	1,341,340,000	68,408,340	5.10	24,144,120	1.80	700,179,480	52.20	100,000	0.01	244,123,880	18.20	293,753,460	21.90	9,389,380	0.70	600 - 1,000	<0.01
Hong Kong	7,053,947	1,048,150	14.30	126,900	1.80	3,955,050	56.10	35,000	0.53	930,600	13.20	902,400	12.80	105,750	1.50	0	0.00
Macau	540,560	38,880	7.20	1,080	0.20	83,160	15.40	200	0.04	93,420	17.30	318,060	58.90	5,400	1.00	0	0.00
Taiwan	23,220,670	1,277,100	5.50	10,000	0.04	2,948,940	12.70	9,000	0.01	4,945,860	21.30	10,263,240	44.20	3,761,640	16.20	0	0.00
Japan	126,540,000	2,024,640	1.60	233,080	0.16	72,127,800	57.00	160,000	0.12	45,807,480	36.20	506,160	0.40	5,947,380	4.70	0	0.00
North Korea	24,350,000	487,000	2.00	0	0.00	17,361,550	71.30	10	0.00	365,250	1.50	2,995,050	12.30	3,141,150	12.90	0	0.00
South Korea	48,180,000	14,164,920	29.40	103,773	0.20	22,355,520	46.40	50,000	0.11	11,033,220	22.90	385,440	0.80	96,360	0.20	0	0.00
Mongolia	3,296,866	42,859	1.3	105,500	3.2	1,338,528	40.6	N/A	N/A	1,704,480	51.7	82,422	2.5	23,078	0.7	N/A	N/A
Total	1,573,980,000	87,472,510	5.56	24,719,860	1.57	820,002,340	52.10	260,000	0.01	308,820,470	19.62	309,220,410	19.65	22,447,060	1.43	600 - 1,000	<0.01

=== Southeastern Asia ===
Country	Population	Christian		Muslim		Irreligion		Hindu		Buddhist		Folk religion		Other religion		Jewish	
Country	Population	Pop.	%	Pop.	%	Pop.	%	Pop.	%	Pop.	%	Pop.	%	Pop.	%	Pop.	%
Brunei	408,540	37,600	9.40	300,400	75.10	1,600	0.40	2,000	0.50	34,400	8.60	24,800	6.20	400	0.10	0	0.00
Cambodia	14,143,680	56,560	0.40	282,800	2.00	28,280	0.20	10,000	0.10	13,701,660	96.90	84,840	0.60	0	0.00	0	0.00
Indonesia	280,725,428	29,403,015	10.41	231,069,932	83.91	8,385,396	3.04	4,677,535	1.69	2,023,719	0.73	122,043	0.04	73,911	0.02	500	0.00
Laos	6,200,000	93,000	1.50	0	0.00	55,800	0.90	1,000	0.01	4,092,000	66.00	1,903,400	30.70	43,400	0.70	0	0.00
Malaysia	33,200,000	3,021,200	9.10	21,082,000	63.50	597,600	1.80	2,025,200	6.10	6,208,400	18.70	0	0.00	298,800	0.90	0	0.00
Myanmar	51,483,949	3,192,005	6.20	2,213,810	4.30	51,483	0.10	257,419	0.50	45,254,391	87.90	411,872	0.80	102,967	0.20	0	0.00
Philippines	108,667,043	92,746,021	85.34	6,981,710	6.42	1,095,000	1.00	30,634	0.02	2,173,400	2.00	259,000	0.23	5,352,805	4.92	28,473	0.02
Singapore	5,700,000	1,077,300	18.90	889,200	15.60	1,140,000	20.00	285,000	5.00	1,772,700	31.10	0	0.00	535,800	9.40	10,456	0.04
Thailand	69,120,000	622,080	0.90	3,801,600	5.50	207,360	0.30	100,120	0.20	64,419,840	93.20	60,000	0.09	0	0.00	0	0.00
Timor-Leste	1,343,875	1,338,500	99.60	2,690	0.20	0	0.00	271	0.02	0	0.00	1,120	0.08	0	0.00	0	0.00
Vietnam	94,700,000	7,765,400	8.20	175,700	0.20	28,031,200	29.60	201,200	0.21	15,530,800	16.40	42,899,100	45.30	351,400	0.40	0	0.00
Total	660,328,354	138,958,397	21.04	266,477,182	40.35	39,593,719	6.00	9,312,430	1.40	155,211,310	23.50	45,766,175	6.90	6,759,483	1.00	28,493	0.00

=== Southern Asia ===
Country	Population	Christian		Muslim		Irreligion		Hindu		Buddhist		Other religion		Jewish	
Country	Population	Pop.	%	Pop.	%	Pop.	%	Pop.	%	Pop.	%	Pop.	%	Pop.	%
Afghanistan	39,090,000	30,000	0.08	39,020,000	99.82	0	0.00	0	0.00	0	0.00	40,000	0.10	0	0.00
Bangladesh	166,290,035	500,000	0.30	151,440,000	91.07	0	0.00	13,140,000	7.90	1,010,000	0.61	200,000	0.12	35	0.00
Bhutan	767,000	0	0.00	7,000	0.91	0	0.00	170,000	22.16	580,000	75.62	10,000	1.30	0	0.00
India	1,402,626,325	31,060,000	2.21	213,060,000	15.19	50,000	0.00	1,113,200,000	79.37	9,550,000	0.68	35,700,000	2.55	6,325	0.00
Maldives	480,000	0	0.00	470,000	97.92	0	0.00	10,000	2.08	0	0	0	0	0	0
Nepal	29,778,748	510,000	1.71	512,000	1.72	1,483,000	4.98	23,680,000	79.52	2,394,000	8.04	1,199,742	4.03	6	0.00
Pakistan	235,000,017	2,990,000	1.27	226,880,000	96.54	30,000	0.01	5,030,000	2.14	20,000	0.01	50,000	0.02	17	0.00
Sri Lanka	22,566,400	1,260,000	5.58	2,300,000	10.19	20,000	0.09	3,280,000	14.53	15,700,000	69.57	6,394	0.03	6	0.00
Total	1,896,598,525	36,350,000	1.92	633,689,000	33.41	1,583,000	0.08	1,158,510,000	61.08	29,254,000	1.54	37,206,136	1.96	3,689	0.00

=== Central Asia ===
Country	Population	Christian		Muslim		Irreligion		Hindu		Buddhist		Folk religion		Other religion		Jewish	
Country	Population	Pop.	%	Pop.	%	Pop.	%	Pop.	%	Pop.	%	Pop.	%	Pop.	%	Pop.	%
Kazakhstan	16,030,460	3,975,440	24.8	11,285,120	70.4	673,260	4.2	5,000	0.01	32,060	0.2	48,090	0.3	16,030	0.1	0	0.00
Kyrgyzstan	5,333,440	607,620	11.40	4,690,400	88.0	21,320	0.40	1,000	0.01	0	0.00	5,330	0.1	0	0.00	0	0.00
Tajikistan	6,880,000	110,080	1.6	6,652,960	96.7	103,200	1.5	9,000	0.01	0	0.00	0	0.00	0	0.00	0	0.00
Turkmenistan	5,040,000	322,560	6.4	4,687,200	93.0	25,200	0.5	6,000	0.00	0	0.00	0	0.00	0	0.00	0	0.00
Uzbekistan	27,440,000	631,120	2.3	26,534,480	96.7	219,520	0.8	16,000	0.01	1,000	< 0.01	1,000	< 0.01	0	0.00	1,000	< 0.01
Total	60,720,000	5,646,820	9.30	53,850,160	88.69	1,042,500	1.72	55000	0.01	33,060	< 0.05	54,420	0.10	16,030	< 0.05	1,000	< 0.01

=== Western Asia ===
Country	Population	Christian		Muslim		Irreligion		Hindu		Buddhist		Folk religion		Other religion		Jewish	
Country	Population	Pop.	%	Pop.	%	Pop.	%	Pop.	%	Pop.	%	Pop.	%	Pop.	%	Pop.	%
Armenia	3,091,245	3,043,650	98.50	<1,000	0.10	40,170	1.30	0	0.00	0	0.00	0	0.00	3,090	0.10	0	0.00
Azerbaijan	9,191,720	275,700	3.00	8,905,110	96.90	0	0.00	0	0.00	0	0.00	0	0.00	0	0.00	0	0.00
Bahrain	1,260,000	182,700	14.50	885,780	70.30	23,940	1.90	123,480	9.80	31,500	2.50	0	0.00	2,520	0.20	7,560	0.60
Cyprus	1,100,000	805,200	73.20	278,300	25.30	13,200	1.20	0	0.00	2,200	0.20	0	0.00	0	0.00	0	0.00
Iran	92,417,681	112,100	0.12	91,955,593	99.5	110,500	0.11	0	0.00	0	0.00	0.00	0.00	149,400	0.16	<10,000	0.01
Iraq	31,670,000	253,360	0.80	31,353,300	99.00	31,670	0.10	0	0.00	0	0.00	0	0.00	20,000	0.06	0	0.00
Israel	7,420,000	148,400	2.00	1,380,120	18.60	230,020	3.10	0	0.00	22,260	0.30	14,840	0.20	7,420	0.10	5,609,520	75.60
Jordan	6,190,000	136,180	2.20	6,016,680	97.20	0	0.00	6,190	0.10	24,760	0.40	0	0.00	0	0.00	0	0.00
Kuwait	2,740,000	391,820	14.30	2,030,340	74.10	0	0.00	232,900	8.50	76,720	2.80	0	0.00	8,220	0.30	0	0.00
Lebanon	4,230,000	2,170,090	47.30	2,592,990	55.30	12,690	0.30	0	0.00	8,460	0.20	0	0.00	0	0.00	0	0.00
Oman	2,780,000	180,700	6.50	2,388,020	85.90	5,560	0.20	152,900	5.50	22,240	0.80	0	0.00	27,800	1.00	0	0.00
Palestine	4,040,000	96,960	2.40	3,943,040	97.60	0	0.00	0	0.00	0	0.00	0	0.00	0	0.00	0	0.00
Qatar	1,760,000	242,880	14.2	1,152,800	65.5	15,840	0.90	242,880	15.1	54,560	3.10	0	0.00	12,320	0.70	0	0.00
Saudi Arabia	27,450,000	1,207,800	4.40	25,528,500	93.00	192,150	0.70	301,950	1.10	82,350	0.30	82,350	0.30	82,350	0.30	0	0.00
Syria	20,410,000	2,122,640	10	18,940,480	92.80	408,200	2.00	0	0.00	0	0.00	0	0.00	0	0.00	0	0.00
Turkey	86,100,000	117,100	0.14	83,600,000	97.09	2,200,000	2.55	37,100	0.04	45,500	0.05	0	0.00	88,500	0.10	25,200	0.03
United Arab Emirates	7,510,000	946,260	14.00	5,775,190	70.00	82,610	1.10	495,660	10.00	150,200	2.00	0	0.00	60,080	0.80	0	0.00
Yemen	24,050,000	48,100	0.20	23,833,550	99.10	24,050	0.10	144,300	0.60	0	0.00	0	0.00	0	0.00	0	0.00
Total	310,787,248	12,759,354	3.87	290,758,294	92.59	4,238,495	1.16	1,562,736	0.28	514,257	0.10	172,635	0.10	712,838	0.30	5,821,928	2.02

== Europe ==
Note: 0.00% corresponds to less than 0.1%, and 0 Pop. corresponds to less than 10,000 people, according to the Pew Research source.

=== Central Europe ===
Country	Population	Christian		Muslim		Irreligion		Hindu		Buddhist		Jewish		Other religion		Not stated/Undeclared	
Country	Population	Pop.	%	Pop.	%	Pop.	%	Pop.	%	Pop.	%	Pop.	%	Pop.	%	Pop.	%
Austria	8,935,800	6,093,700	68.2	745,600	8.3	1,997,700	22.40	10,100	0.00	26,600	0.20	5,400	0.00	62,100	0.1		
Czech Republic	10,524,167	1,241,214	11.7	5,244	0.05	5,027,094	47.8	2,024	0.02	5,757	0.05	1,474	0.02	1,123,283	10.7	3,162,540	30.1
Germany	82,300,000	56,540,100	68.70	4,773,400	5.80	20,328,100	24.70	N/A	N/A	246,900	0.30	246,990	0.30	82,300	0.10	N/A	N/A
Hungary	9,603,630	4,086,250	42.5	7,983	0.1	1,549,610	16.1	3,307	0.03	11,042	0.1	7,635	0.1	85,646	0.9	3,852,533	40.1
Liechtenstein	40,000	36,760	91.90	2,000	5.00	1,160	2.90	N/A	N/A	N/A	N/A	N/A	N/A	N/A	N/A	40	0.10
Poland	38,036,120	27,550,861	72.43	2,209	0.01	2,611,506	6.87	N/A	N/A	3,236	0.01	N/A	N/A	44,694	0.12	7,823,612	20.57
Slovakia	5,449,270	3,747,558	68.8	3,862	0.1	1,296,142	23.8	975	0.02	6,722	0.1	2,007	0.04	38,157	0.7	353,797	6.5
Total	163,169,237	118,062,752	72.36	5,951,406	3.47	33,471,696	20.51	43,739	0.03	316,619	0.19	255,871	0.16	1,313,500	0.80	3,549,337	2.18

=== Eastern Europe ===
Country	Population	Christian		Muslim		Irreligion		Hindu		Buddhist		Folk religion		Other religion		Jewish	
Country	Population	Pop.	%	Pop.	%	Pop.	%	Pop.	%	Pop.	%	Pop.	%	Pop.	%	Pop.	%
Belarus	9,611,750	6,835,200	71.20	19,200	0.20	2,745,600	28.60	0	0.00	0	0.00	0	0.00	0	0.00	0	0.00
(Georgia (country)) Georgia	4,350,225	3,849,750	88.50	465,450	10.70	30,450	0.70	0	0.00	0	0.00	0	0.00	0	0.00	0	0.00
Russia	142,960,000	104,789,680	73.30	14,296,000	10.00	23,159,520	16.20	0	0.00	142,960	0.10	285,920	0.20	0	0.00	285,920	0.20
Ukraine	45,450,000	38,087,100	83.80	545,400	1.20	6,681,150	14.70	0	0.00	0	0.00	0	0.00	0	0.00	45,450	0.10
Total	202,360,000	153,561,730	75.89%	15,326,050	7.57%	32,616,720	16.12%	40,000	0.02%	162,960	0.08%	290,420	0.14%	0	0.00%	331,370	0.16%

=== Northern Europe ===
Country	Population	Christian		Muslim		Irreligion		Jewish		Buddhist		Pagan		Other religion		/Undecided/Not Stated	
Country	Population	Pop.	%	Pop.	%	Pop.	%	Pop.	%	Pop.	%	Pop.	%	Pop.	%	Pop.	%
Denmark	5,822,863	4,413,430	75.8	256,206	4.4	1,112,167	19.1	N/A	N/A	N/A	N/A	N/A	N/A	40,760	0.7	N/A	N/A
Faroe Islands	50,000	49,000	98.00	0	0.00	850	1.70	0	0.00	0	0.00	0	0.00	150	0.30	0	0.00
Estonia^{*}	1,331,824	298,410	26.8	5,800	0.5	650,900	58.4	N/A	N/A	1,880	0.2	5,630	0.5	9,630	0.9	141,780	12.7
Finland	5,548,000	3,805,928	68.6	N/A	N/A	1,697,688	30.6	0	0.00	0	0.00	0	0.00	44,384	0.8	0	0.00
Iceland	364,134	274,321	75.06	1,281	0.35	29,621	8.13	N/A	N/A	1,495	0.42	4,764	1.31	53,652	14.73	N/A	N/A
Latvia	1,893,223	1,249,527	66.0	2,500	0.10	539,035	29.0	0	0.00	0	0.00	0	0.00	4,500	0.20	0	0.00
Lithuania	3,320,000	2,230,020	79.37	2,165	0.08	171,810	6.11	1,154	0.04	N/A	N/A	N/A	N/A	16,486	0.58	384,094	13.67
Norway	5,367,580	4,059,366	75.63	182,826	3.41	1,083,076	20.17	794	0.01	21,555	0.40	N/A	N/A	19,963	5.21	N/A	N/A
Sweden	10,379,295	6,364,093	61.3	246,498	2.3	3,739,255	36.0	8,148	0.08	12,328	0.1	N/A	N/A	10,380	0.10	N/A	N/A
Total	32,450,000	24,569,250	75.71%	893,290	2.75%	6,751,930	20.81%	66,320	0.20%	79,180	0.24%	20,370	0.06%	33,810	0.10%	9,380	0.03%
^{*} Only includes the population of religious affiliation for 15 years old or above.

=== Southeastern Europe ===
Country	Population	Christian		Muslim		Irreligion		Hindu		Buddhist		Other religion		Jewish	
Country	Population	Pop.	%	Pop.	%	Pop.	%	Pop.	%	Pop.	%	Pop.	%	Pop.	%
Albania	2,870,000	510,000	17.77	2,140,000	74.56	220,000	7.67								
Bosnia and Herzegovina	3,290,000	1,470,000	44.68	1,770,000	53.80	30,000	0.91					20,000	0.61		
Bulgaria	6,519,789	4,219,270	64.71	638,708	9.80	305,102	4.68					6,451	0.10	1,736	0.03
Croatia	3,871,833	3,383,980	87.40	51,110	1.32	247,410	6.39					72,400	1.87		
Greece	10,691,360	9,570,000	89.51	550,000	5.14	510,000	4.77	11,360	0.11			50,000	0.47		
Kosovo	1,783,280	100,000	5.61	1,650,000	92.53	33,280	1.87								
Moldova	3,142,820	3,050,000	97.05	21,420	0.68	49,980	1.59							21,420	0.68
Montenegro	610,160	460,000	75.39	130,000	21.31	20,160	3.30								
North Macedonia	1,836,713	1,109,808	60.42	590,879	32.17	10,728	0.58			894	0.05	209	0.01	74	0.00
Romania	19,053,815	16,161,328	84.82	58,335	0.31	128,622	0.68					23,925	0.13	2,707	0.01
Serbia	6,910,000	6,320,000	91.46	310,000	4.49	280,000	4.05								
Slovenia	2,100,000	1,380,000	65.71	30,000	1.43	680,000	32.38					10,000	0.48		
Total	62,679,770	47,734,386	76.16	7,940,452	12.67	2,515,282	4.01	11,360	0.02	894	0.01	182,985	0.29	25,937	0.04

=== Southern Europe ===
Country	Population	Christian		Muslim		Irreligion		Hindu		Buddhist		Folk religion		Other religion		Jewish	
Country	Population	Pop.	%	Pop.	%	Pop.	%	Pop.	%	Pop.	%	Pop.	%	Pop.	%	Pop.	%
Andorra	82,740	71,600	89.50	640	0.80	7,040	8.80	400	0.50	0	0.00	0	0.00	80	0.10	240	0.30
Gibraltar	30,000	26,640	88.80	1,200	4.00	870	2.90	540	1.80	0	0.00	0	0.00	90	0.30	630	2.10
Italy	60,550,000	50,438,150	83.30	2,240,350	3.70	7,508,200	12.40	60,550	0.10	121,100	0.20	60,550	0.10	60,000	0.10	50,000	0.08
Malta	420,264	407,400	97.00	840	0.20	10,500	2.50	840	0.20	0	0.00	0	0.00	0	0.00	0	0.00
Portugal	10,343,066	7,444,786	84.77	36,480	0.42	1,237,130	14.09	19,471	0.22	16,757	0.19	N/A	N/A	24,366	0.28	2,910	0.03
San Marino	30,000	27,480	91.60	0	0.00	2,160	7.20	0	0.00	0	0.00	0	0.00	270	0.90	90	0.30
Spain	46,080,000	23,961,600	52.0	967,680	2.10	20,321,280	44.1	20,000	0.04	0	0.00	20,000	0.04	10,000	0.02	46,080	0.10
Vatican City	800	800	100.00	0	0.00	0	0.00	0	0.00	0	0.00	0	0.00	0	0.00	0	0.00
Total	106,870,800	87,208,790	82.47%	2,674,790	2.78%	16,053,890	14.21%	93,010	0.08%	185,180	0.16%	133,950	0.11%	70,440	0.06%	97,040	0.08%

=== Western Europe ===
Country	Population	Christian		Muslim		Irreligion		Hindu		Buddhist		Paganism/Neo-Paganism		Other religion		Jewish		Not stated/Undeclared	
Country	Population	Pop.	%	Pop.	%	Pop.	%	Pop.	%	Pop.	%	Pop.	%	Pop.	%	Pop.	%	Pop.	%
Belgium	10,710,530	6,875,820	64.25	631,890	5.90	3,105,900	29.00	0	0.00	21,420	0.20	21,420	0.20	0	0.00	32,130	0.30		
France	65,250,000	32,625,000	50.0	2,610,000	4.0	21,532,500	33.0	N/A	N/A	1,305,000	2.0	N/A	N/A	653,000	1.0	652,500	1.0	5,873,000	9.0
Switzerland	8,680,980	5,321,440	61.30	477,450	5.50	2,769,230	31.90	30,640	0.40	30,640	0.40			7,660	0.10	22,980	0.30		
(Republic of Ireland) Ireland	5,145,255	3,885,560	75.50	83,272	1.60	758,734	14.80	33,827	0.70	9,285	0.20	3,868	0.10	22,163	0.40	n/a	n/a	345,165	6.70
Isle of Man	84,069	40,735	48.5	393	0.5	32,603	38.8	263	0.3	390	0.5	0	0.0	0	0.0	113	0.1	9,582	11.4
Luxembourg	510,000	359,040	70.40	11,730	2.30	136,680	26.80	0	0.00	0	0.00	0	0.00	1,530	0.30	510	0.10		
Monaco	40,000	34,400	86.00	160	0.40	4,680	11.70	0	0.00	0	0.00	0	0.00	80	0.20	680	1.70		
Netherlands	17,424,978	6,238,140	35.8	801,550	4.6	10,019,362	57.5	N/A	N/A	N/A	N/A	N/A	N/A	365,925	2.1	N/A	N/A	N/A	N/A
United Kingdom	66,796,121	31,889,018	47.8	3,955,740	5.9	24,434,161	36.6	1,053,344	1.6	286,845	0.4	107,694	0.16	890,446	1.3	782,752	0.3	3,994,157	6.0
Total	174,186,600	87,376,385	50.16	8,551,045	4.91	62,509,940	35.88	1,183,141	0.73	666,325	0.41	244,152	0.15	1,060,068	0.65	661,561	0.41	4,130,389	2.55

== Oceania ==
=== Australasia ===
Country	Population	Christian		Muslim		Irreligion		Hindu		Buddhist		Folk religion		Other religion		Jewish	
Country	Population	Pop.	%	Pop.	%	Pop.	%	Pop.	%	Pop.	%	Pop.	%	Pop.	%	Pop.	%
Australia	25,422,800	11,148,800	43.90	813,392	3.20	9,887,000	38.90	684,002	2.70	615,800	2.40	325,400	1.30	178,160	0.80	100,350	0.40
New Zealand	4,699,755	1,738,638	37.00	61,455	1.31	2,278,185	48.47	123,504	2.63	52,779	1.12	19,011	0.40	153,873	3.27	5,274	0.11
Total	30,122,555	12,887,438	42.78%	874,487	2.90%	12,165,185	40.39%	807,506	2.68%	668,579	2.22%	344,411	0.59%	479,273	1.59%	109,090	0.36%

=== Melanesia ===
Country	Population	Christian		Muslim		Irreligion		Hindu		Buddhist		Folk religion		Other religion		Jewish	
Country	Population	Pop.	%	Pop.	%	Pop.	%	Pop.	%	Pop.	%	Pop.	%	Pop.	%	Pop.	%
Fiji	860,820	553,840	64.40	58,400	6.40	6,880	0.80	239,941	27.90	0	0.00	0	0.00	4,300	0.50	0	0.00
New Caledonia	250,000	213,000	85.20	7,000	2.80	26,000	10.40	0	0.00	1,500	0.60	500	0.20	2,000	0.80	0	0.00
Papua New Guinea	6,860,000	6,805,120	99.20	2,020	0.003	0	0.00	0	0.00	0	0.00	27,440	0.40	13,720	0.20	0	0.00
Solomon Islands	540,000	525,960	97.40	200	0.10	1,080	0.20	0	0.00	1,620	0.30	7,020	1.30	3,780	0.70	0	0.00
Vanuatu	240,000	223,920	93.30	1,000	0.10	2,880	1.20	0	0.00	0	0.00	9,840	4.10	3,360	1.40	0	0.00
Total	8,750,000	8,321,840	95.11%	61,180	0.70%	36,840	0.42%	239,940	2.74%	3,120	0.04%	44,800	0.51%	27,160	0.31%	0	0.00%

=== Micronesia ===
Country	Population	Christian		Muslim		Irreligion		Hindu		Buddhist		Folk religion		Other religion		Jewish	
Country	Population	Pop.	%	Pop.	%	Pop.	%	Pop.	%	Pop.	%	Pop.	%	Pop.	%	Pop.	%
Guam	180,000	169,560	94.20	300	0.10	3,060	1.60	0	0.00	1,980	1.10	2,700	1.50	2,880	1.60	0	0.00
Kiribati	101,120	97,000	97.00	500	0.20	800	0.80	0	0.00	0	0.00	0	0.00	2,200	2.00	0	0.00
Marshall Islands	50,000	48,750	97.50	180	0.20	750	1.50	0	0.00	0	0.00	100	0.10	400	0.80	0	0.00
(Federated States of Micronesia) Micronesia	110,000	104,830	95.20	208	0.10	990	1.00	0	0.00	440	0.40	2,975	2.60	770	0.70	0	0.00
Nauru	10,000	7,900	79.00	20	0.01	450	4.50	0	0.00	110	1.10	810	8.10	740	7.40	0	0.00
Northern Mariana Islands	60,000	48,780	81.30	420	0.70	600	1.00	0	0.00	6,360	10.60	3,180	5.30	660	1.10	0	0.00
Palau	20,000	17,340	86.80	240	0.10	240	1.20	0	0.00	160	0.80	160	0.80	2,080	10.20	0	0.00
Total	530,000	494,160	93.24%	1808	0.08%	6,890	1.30%	0	0.00%	9,050	1.71%	9,970	1.88%	9,730	1.84%	0	0.00%

=== Polynesia ===
Country	Population	Christian		Muslim		Irreligion		Hindu		Buddhist		Folk religion		Other religion		Jewish	
Country	Population	Pop.	%	Pop.	%	Pop.	%	Pop.	%	Pop.	%	Pop.	%	Pop.	%	Pop.	%
American Samoa	70,920	68,860	98.30	50	0.10	490	0.70	0	0.00	210	0.30	280	0.40	210	0.30	0	0.00
Cook Islands	20,000	19,200	96.00	0	0.00	640	3.20	0	0.00	0	0.00	0	0.00	160	0.80	0	0.00
French Polynesia	270,000	253,800	94.00	688	0.10	13,230	4.80	0	0.00	0	0.00	1,350	0.50	1,080	0.40	0	0.00
Niue	2,000	1,928	96.40	50	0.10	66	3.20	0	0.00	0	0.00	0	0.00	4	0.20	0	0.00
Samoa	180,000	174,240	96.80	300	0.10	4,500	2.50	0	0.00	0	0.00	0	0.00	720	0.30	0	0.00
Tokelau	1,414	1,397	99.80	0	0.00	0	0.00	0	0.00	0	0.00	0	0.00	3	0.20	0	0.00
Tonga	100,000	99,000	99.00	120	0.10	0	0.00	100	0.10	0	0.00	0	0.00	900	0.80	0	0.00
Tuvalu	11,000	10,800	99.80	200	0.20	0	0.00	0	0.00	0	0.00	0	0.00	0	0.00	0	0.00
Wallis and Futuna	13,000	12,662	97.40	0	0.00	78	0.60	0	0.00	0	0.00	156	1.20	104	0.80	0	0.00
Total	667,400	641,574	96.13%	1400	0.20%	19,147	2.87%	100	0.01%	210	0.03%	1,786	0.27%	3,390	0.51%	0	0.00%

== 2020 Pew Research World Religious Landscape ==
Table shows the religious makeup of 201 countries and territories

Country	Christians	Muslims	Unaffiliated	Hindus	Buddhists	Other religions	Jews	Total
World	2,268,860,000	2,022,590,000	1,905,360,000	1,177,860,000	324,190,000	172,170,000	14,780,000	7,885,810,000
Asia-Pacific	268,840,000	1,187,660,000	1,492,750,000	1,166,710,000	316,110,000	112,540,000	190,000	4,544,800,000
Europe	505,140,000	45,510,000	190,320,000	2,150,000	2,540,000	6,020,000	1,280,000	752,960,000
Latin America-Caribbean	546,920,000	750,000	77,150,000	700,000	330,000	20,000,000	390,000	646,240,000
Middle East-North Africa	12,920,000	414,110,000	1,860,000	3,220,000	90,000	700,000	6,790,000	439,690,000
North America	237,630,000	5,910,000	114,130,000	3,620,000	5,050,000	5,180,000	6,090,000	377,610,000
Sub-Saharan Africa	697,420,000	368,640,000	29,140,000	1,460,000	70,000	27,730,000	50,000	1,124,520,000
Afghanistan	<10K	39,020,000	<10K	<10K	<10K	40,000	<10K	39,070,000
Albania	510,000	2,140,000	220,000	<10K	<10K	<10K	<10K	2,870,000
Algeria	130,000	43,330,000	560,000	<10K	<10K	20,000	<10K	44,040,000
Angola	31,120,000	90,000	2,050,000	<10K	<10K	190,000	<10K	33,450,000
Argentina	39,970,000	420,000	4,170,000	<10K	10,000	440,000	170,000	45,190,000
Armenia	2,810,000	<10K	30,000	<10K	<10K	40,000	<10K	2,890,000
Aruba	90,000	<10K	<10K	<10K	<10K	10,000	<10K	110,000
Australia	12,040,000	900,000	10,900,000	760,000	670,000	360,000	110,000	25,740,000
Austria	6,080,000	740,000	2,000,000	10,000	30,000	60,000	<10K	8,920,000
Azerbaijan	40,000	9,640,000	480,000	<10K	<10K	<10K	<10K	10,180,000
(The Bahamas) Bahamas	390,000	<10K	<10K	<10K	<10K	<10K	<10K	400,000
Bahrain	200,000	1,100,000	<10K	170,000	<10K	<10K	<10K	1,480,000
Bangladesh	500,000	151,440,000	<10K	13,140,000	1,010,000	200,000	<10K	166,300,000
Barbados	220,000	<10K	60,000	<10K	<10K	<10K	<10K	280,000
Belarus	7,960,000	20,000	1,290,000	<10K	<10K	70,000	<10K	9,350,000
Belgium	5,880,000	790,000	4,500,000	30,000	20,000	300,000	30,000	11,540,000
Belize	290,000	<10K	60,000	<10K	<10K	40,000	<10K	390,000
Benin	6,960,000	4,100,000	640,000	<10K	<10K	1,370,000	<10K	13,070,000
Bhutan	<10K	<10K	<10K	170,000	580,000	10,000	<10K	770,000
Bolivia	10,510,000	<10K	1,130,000	<10K	<10K	180,000	<10K	11,820,000
(Bosnia and Herzegovina) Bosnia-Herzegovina	1,470,000	1,770,000	30,000	<10K	<10K	20,000	<10K	3,300,000
Botswana	1,950,000	<10K	350,000	<10K	<10K	50,000	<10K	2,370,000
Brazil	168,300,000	40,000	28,110,000	<10K	220,000	11,910,000	90,000	208,660,000
Brunei	30,000	370,000	<10K	<10K	30,000	20,000	<10K	450,000
Bulgaria	5,510,000	710,000	700,000	<10K	<10K	<10K	<10K	6,930,000
Burkina Faso	6,010,000	14,480,000	120,000	<10K	<10K	860,000	<10K	21,480,000
Burundi	11,980,000	380,000	160,000	<10K	<10K	100,000	<10K	12,620,000
Cambodia	50,000	340,000	10,000	<10K	16,240,000	80,000	<10K	16,730,000
Cameroon	18,300,000	6,590,000	550,000	<10K	<10K	760,000	<10K	26,210,000
Canada	20,350,000	1,870,000	13,220,000	580,000	660,000	1,140,000	350,000	38,170,000
Cape Verde	400,000	<10K	110,000	<10K	<10K	<10K	<10K	510,000
Central African Republic	4,560,000	310,000	20,000	<10K	<10K	130,000	<10K	5,030,000
Chad	6,700,000	9,710,000	540,000	<10K	<10K	270,000	<10K	17,220,000
Channel Islands	140,000	<10K	20,000	<10K	<10K	<10K	<10K	170,000
Chile	13,240,000	10,000	5,860,000	<10K	<10K	240,000	20,000	19,370,000
China	25,450,000	25,980,000	1,278,120,000	30,000	53,380,000	43,140,000	<10K	1,426,110,000
Colombia	43,670,000	<10K	5,030,000	<10K	<10K	1,920,000	<10K	50,630,000
Comoros	<10K	790,000	<10K	<10K	<10K	<10K	<10K	800,000
Costa Rica	4,420,000	<10K	510,000	<10K	<10K	100,000	<10K	5,030,000
Croatia	3,590,000	50,000	260,000	<10K	<10K	40,000	<10K	3,950,000
Cuba	6,780,000	<10K	2,410,000	20,000	<10K	1,940,000	<10K	11,180,000
(Curaçao) Curacao	170,000	<10K	10,000	<10K	<10K	<10K	<10K	190,000
Cyprus	880,000	320,000	90,000	<10K	<10K	<10K	<10K	1,300,000
Czech Republic	2,790,000	30,000	7,680,000	<10K	<10K	40,000	<10K	10,550,000
Democratic Republic of the Congo	92,400,000	1,220,000	1,130,000	<10K	<10K	1,240,000	<10K	95,990,000
Denmark	4,480,000	250,000	970,000	30,000	40,000	60,000	<10K	5,830,000
Djibouti	10,000	1,080,000	10,000	<10K	<10K	<10K	<10K	1,110,000
Dominican Republic	8,550,000	<10K	2,160,000	<10K	<10K	300,000	<10K	11,010,000
Ecuador	15,530,000	<10K	1,470,000	<10K	<10K	530,000	<10K	17,550,000
Egypt	5,270,000	104,040,000	<10K	<10K	<10K	<10K	<10K	109,320,000
El Salvador	5,430,000	<10K	740,000	<10K	<10K	60,000	<10K	6,230,000
Equatorial Guinea	1,520,000	70,000	90,000	<10K	<10K	40,000	<10K	1,720,000
Eritrea	1,540,000	1,700,000	30,000	<10K	<10K	20,000	<10K	3,290,000
Estonia	700,000	<10K	580,000	<10K	<10K	40,000	<10K	1,330,000
Eswatini	1,110,000	<10K	70,000	<10K	<10K	<10K	<10K	1,190,000
Ethiopia	73,230,000	43,100,000	70,000	<10K	<10K	2,510,000	<10K	118,920,000
Federated States of Micronesia	110,000	<10K	<10K	<10K	<10K	<10K	<10K	110,000
Fiji	640,000	50,000	<10K	220,000	<10K	<10K	<10K	910,000
Finland	4,000,000	90,000	1,390,000	<10K	20,000	30,000	<10K	5,530,000
France	30,620,000	6,000,000	28,110,000	80,000	470,000	170,000	460,000	65,910,000
French Guiana	240,000	<10K	<10K	<10K	<10K	30,000	<10K	290,000
French Polynesia	260,000	<10K	10,000	<10K	<10K	<10K	<10K	280,000
Gabon	1,940,000	200,000	130,000	<10K	<10K	40,000	<10K	2,320,000
(The Gambia) Gambia	70,000	2,440,000	<10K	<10K	<10K	<10K	<10K	2,520,000
(Georgia (country)) Georgia	3,350,000	400,000	40,000	<10K	<10K	10,000	<10K	3,800,000
Germany	47,030,000	5,480,000	30,230,000	130,000	290,000	360,000	120,000	83,630,000
Ghana	22,730,000	6,340,000	340,000	<10K	<10K	2,480,000	<10K	31,890,000
Greece	9,570,000	550,000	510,000	<10K	<10K	50,000	<10K	10,700,000
Grenada	100,000	<10K	<10K	<10K	<10K	<10K	<10K	120,000
Guadeloupe	390,000	<10K	10,000	<10K	<10K	<10K	<10K	410,000
Guam	150,000	<10K	<10K	<10K	<10K	<10K	<10K	160,000
Guatemala	15,960,000	<10K	1,050,000	<10K	<10K	350,000	<10K	17,360,000
Guinea	1,570,000	11,610,000	180,000	<10K	10,000	10,000	<10K	13,370,000
Guinea-Bissau	440,000	1,130,000	230,000	<10K	<10K	220,000	<10K	2,010,000
Guyana	530,000	50,000	20,000	190,000	<10K	10,000	<10K	810,000
Haiti	9,980,000	<10K	1,060,000	<10K	<10K	210,000	<10K	11,240,000
Honduras	8,950,000	<10K	990,000	<10K	<10K	180,000	<10K	10,120,000
Hong Kong	1,400,000	20,000	5,340,000	20,000	630,000	70,000	<10K	7,490,000
Hungary	7,060,000	10,000	2,630,000	<10K	20,000	10,000	10,000	9,750,000
Iceland	270,000	<10K	70,000	<10K	<10K	<10K	<10K	370,000
India	31,060,000	213,060,000	50,000	1,113,200,000	9,550,000	35,700,000	<10K	1,402,620,000
Indonesia	28,200,000	238,990,000	250,000	4,350,000	1,860,000	1,150,000	<10K	274,810,000
Iran	130,000	87,520,000	<10K	<10K	<10K	70,000	<10K	87,720,000
Iraq	160,000	41,910,000	<10K	<10K	<10K	50,000	<10K	42,120,000
(Republic of Ireland) Ireland	4,050,000	80,000	780,000	30,000	<10K	30,000	<10K	4,980,000
Israel	170,000	1,300,000	380,000	10,000	<10K	150,000	6,780,000	8,800,000
Italy	48,210,000	2,650,000	7,950,000	260,000	370,000	430,000	40,000	59,910,000
Ivory Coast	12,990,000	13,390,000	1,610,000	<10K	<10K	930,000	<10K	28,920,000
Jamaica	1,940,000	<10K	670,000	<10K	<10K	210,000	<10K	2,830,000
Japan	2,840,000	210,000	72,570,000	40,000	46,990,000	3,640,000	<10K	126,300,000
Jordan	310,000	10,550,000	<10K	<10K	<10K	<10K	<10K	10,870,000
Kazakhstan	3,760,000	15,180,000	490,000	<10K	20,000	30,000	<10K	19,480,000
Kenya	44,730,000	5,710,000	840,000	70,000	<10K	870,000	<10K	52,220,000
Kiribati	120,000	<10K	<10K	<10K	<10K	<10K	<10K	130,000
Kosovo	100,000	1,650,000	<10K	<10K	<10K	<10K	<10K	1,750,000
Kuwait	460,000	3,530,000	10,000	370,000	<10K	20,000	<10K	4,400,000
Kyrgyzstan	380,000	6,110,000	80,000	<10K	<10K	90,000	<10K	6,660,000
Laos	110,000	<10K	<10K	<10K	4,710,000	2,510,000	<10K	7,350,000
Latvia	1,470,000	10,000	320,000	<10K	<10K	90,000	<10K	1,900,000
Lebanon	1,590,000	3,870,000	<10K	<10K	<10K	240,000	<10K	5,700,000
Lesotho	2,180,000	<10K	40,000	<10K	<10K	20,000	<10K	2,240,000
Liberia	4,390,000	660,000	50,000	<10K	<10K	50,000	<10K	5,150,000
Libya	40,000	6,970,000	<10K	<10K	20,000	<10K	<10K	7,050,000
Lithuania	2,580,000	<10K	200,000	<10K	<10K	20,000	<10K	2,800,000
Luxembourg	420,000	10,000	160,000	<10K	<10K	40,000	<10K	630,000
(Macau) Macao	70,000	<10K	460,000	<10K	130,000	20,000	<10K	680,000
Madagascar	21,490,000	340,000	6,460,000	20,000	<10K	650,000	<10K	28,950,000
Malawi	17,070,000	2,260,000	180,000	10,000	<10K	10,000	<10K	19,530,000
Malaysia	3,100,000	21,730,000	290,000	2,070,000	6,400,000	300,000	<10K	33,890,000
Maldives	<10K	470,000	<10K	10,000	<10K	<10K	<10K	500,000
Mali	560,000	20,440,000	550,000	<10K	<10K	170,000	<10K	21,710,000
Malta	460,000	20,000	30,000	<10K	<10K	<10K	<10K	520,000
Martinique	340,000	<10K	<10K	<10K	<10K	<10K	<10K	360,000
Mauritania	10,000	4,560,000	<10K	<10K	<10K	20,000	<10K	4,600,000
Mauritius	420,000	220,000	<10K	620,000	<10K	<10K	<10K	1,280,000
Mayotte	<10K	280,000	<10K	<10K	<10K	<10K	<10K	280,000
Mexico	113,070,000	<10K	13,480,000	<10K	20,000	150,000	60,000	126,800,000
Moldova	3,050,000	<10K	<10K	<10K	<10K	<10K	<10K	3,070,000
Mongolia	40,000	120,000	1,340,000	<10K	1,680,000	100,000	<10K	3,290,000
Montenegro	460,000	130,000	<10K	<10K	<10K	<10K	<10K	610,000
Morocco	30,000	36,470,000	50,000	<10K	<10K	40,000	<10K	36,580,000
Mozambique	18,880,000	5,980,000	4,400,000	<10K	<10K	1,510,000	<10K	30,780,000
Myanmar	3,250,000	1,770,000	30,000	230,000	47,210,000	510,000	<10K	53,020,000
Namibia	2,470,000	<10K	150,000	<10K	<10K	100,000	<10K	2,730,000
Nepal	510,000	1,470,000	<10K	23,520,000	2,380,000	1,090,000	<10K	28,970,000
Netherlands	6,190,000	970,000	9,540,000	100,000	50,000	750,000	30,000	17,640,000
New Caledonia	240,000	<10K	30,000	<10K	<10K	<10K	<10K	280,000
New Zealand	2,040,000	70,000	2,600,000	140,000	60,000	150,000	<10K	5,070,000
Nicaragua	5,570,000	<10K	870,000	<10K	<10K	120,000	<10K	6,570,000
Niger	130,000	23,270,000	290,000	<10K	<10K	20,000	<10K	23,720,000
Nigeria	92,770,000	119,980,000	810,000	<10K	<10K	430,000	<10K	214,000,000
North Korea	100,000	<10K	19,040,000	<10K	400,000	6,590,000	<10K	26,140,000
North Macedonia	1,210,000	650,000	<10K	<10K	<10K	<10K	<10K	1,870,000
Norway	3,840,000	220,000	1,210,000	10,000	40,000	50,000	<10K	5,380,000
Oman	370,000	3,700,000	<10K	430,000	<10K	20,000	<10K	4,520,000
Pakistan	2,990,000	226,880,000	30,000	5,030,000	20,000	50,000	<10K	235,000,000
(Palestine) Palestinian territories	50,000	5,020,000	<10K	<10K	<10K	<10K	<10K	5,070,000
Panama	3,910,000	<10K	270,000	<10K	<10K	90,000	<10K	4,290,000
Papua New Guinea	9,730,000	<10K	30,000	<10K	<10K	50,000	<10K	9,820,000
Paraguay	6,180,000	<10K	280,000	<10K	<10K	140,000	<10K	6,600,000
Peru	31,030,000	<10K	1,680,000	<10K	10,000	110,000	<10K	32,840,000
Philippines	102,510,000	7,240,000	50,000	<10K	40,000	2,240,000	<10K	112,080,000
Poland	34,810,000	<10K	3,300,000	<10K	<10K	50,000	<10K	38,170,000
Portugal	8,820,000	40,000	1,430,000	20,000	20,000	30,000	<10K	10,370,000
Puerto Rico	2,910,000	<10K	340,000	<10K	<10K	<10K	<10K	3,280,000
Qatar	350,000	2,130,000	<10K	300,000	<10K	10,000	<10K	2,800,000
Republic of the Congo	5,310,000	80,000	300,000	<10K	<10K	60,000	<10K	5,750,000
(Réunion) Reunion	750,000	40,000	20,000	40,000	<10K	10,000	<10K	860,000
Romania	19,110,000	70,000	180,000	<10K	<10K	10,000	<10K	19,390,000
Russia	102,350,000	11,990,000	29,560,000	100,000	520,000	1,720,000	120,000	146,370,000
Rwanda	12,680,000	240,000	130,000	<10K	<10K	20,000	<10K	13,070,000
Samoa	210,000	<10K	<10K	<10K	<10K	<10K	<10K	210,000
São Tomé and Príncipe	180,000	<10K	20,000	<10K	<10K	10,000	<10K	220,000
Saudi Arabia	1,360,000	28,730,000	30,000	810,000	20,000	40,000	<10K	30,990,000
Senegal	400,000	16,380,000	<10K	<10K	<10K	<10K	<10K	16,790,000
Serbia	6,320,000	310,000	280,000	<10K	<10K	<10K	<10K	6,910,000
Seychelles	110,000	<10K	<10K	<10K	<10K	<10K	<10K	120,000
Sierra Leone	1,570,000	6,340,000	<10K	<10K	<10K	<10K	<10K	7,910,000
Singapore	1,050,000	910,000	1,120,000	300,000	1,730,000	510,000	<10K	5,620,000
Slovakia	4,020,000	<10K	1,380,000	<10K	<10K	40,000	<10K	5,460,000
Slovenia	1,380,000	30,000	680,000	<10K	<10K	10,000	<10K	2,100,000
Solomon Islands	710,000	<10K	<10K	<10K	<10K	30,000	<10K	740,000
Somalia	<10K	16,620,000	<10K	<10K	<10K	10,000	<10K	16,650,000
South Africa	51,630,000	970,000	1,890,000	640,000	20,000	5,360,000	40,000	60,560,000
South Korea	16,590,000	160,000	25,030,000	50,000	9,850,000	180,000	<10K	51,860,000
South Sudan	6,470,000	670,000	50,000	<10K	<10K	3,510,000	<10K	10,700,000
Spain	33,120,000	1,700,000	12,570,000	60,000	<10K	210,000	10,000	47,680,000
Sri Lanka	1,260,000	2,300,000	20,000	3,280,000	15,700,000	<10K	<10K	22,560,000
(Saint Lucia) St. Lucia	160,000	<10K	10,000	<10K	<10K	<10K	<10K	180,000
(Saint Vincent and the Grenadines) St. Vincent and the Grenadines	90,000	<10K	<10K	<10K	<10K	<10K	<10K	100,000
Sudan	230,000	46,250,000	260,000	<10K	<10K	40,000	<10K	46,790,000
Suriname	320,000	80,000	50,000	140,000	<10K	20,000	<10K	610,000
Sweden	6,290,000	840,000	2,990,000	50,000	90,000	80,000	20,000	10,350,000
Switzerland	5,320,000	530,000	2,660,000	50,000	50,000	20,000	20,000	8,640,000
Syria	810,000	19,820,000	420,000	<10K	<10K	<10K	<10K	21,050,000
Taiwan	1,310,000	120,000	5,460,000	<10K	4,540,000	12,230,000	<10K	23,660,000
Tajikistan	100,000	9,640,000	<10K	<10K	<10K	<10K	<10K	9,750,000
Tanzania	39,440,000	18,210,000	2,120,000	<10K	<10K	1,190,000	<10K	60,970,000
Thailand	740,000	3,230,000	<10K	30,000	67,620,000	<10K	<10K	71,640,000
Timor-Leste	1,320,000	<10K	<10K	<10K	<10K	<10K	<10K	1,330,000
Togo	4,930,000	1,400,000	690,000	<10K	<10K	1,640,000	<10K	8,670,000
Tonga	100,000	<10K	<10K	<10K	<10K	<10K	<10K	110,000
Trinidad and Tobago	1,040,000	80,000	40,000	310,000	<10K	20,000	<10K	1,480,000
Tunisia	30,000	11,890,000	50,000	<10K	<10K	<10K	<10K	11,970,000
Turkey	120,000	83,600,000	2,180,000	40,000	50,000	90,000	30,000	86,090,000
Turkmenistan	390,000	6,550,000	<10K	<10K	<10K	<10K	<10K	6,950,000
(United States Virgin Islands) U.S. Virgin Islands	80,000	<10K	<10K	<10K	<10K	<10K	<10K	90,000
Uganda	39,010,000	5,070,000	40,000	<10K	<10K	330,000	<10K	44,460,000
Ukraine	37,280,000	250,000	6,770,000	<10K	150,000	190,000	40,000	44,680,000
United Arab Emirates	1,350,000	6,890,000	30,000	1,110,000	20,000	40,000	<10K	9,450,000
United Kingdom	33,250,000	4,290,000	27,090,000	1,140,000	310,000	980,000	300,000	67,350,000
United States	217,270,000	4,050,000	100,910,000	3,040,000	4,380,000	4,050,000	5,730,000	339,440,000
Uruguay	1,510,000	<10K	1,780,000	<10K	<10K	90,000	20,000	3,400,000
Uzbekistan	930,000	32,120,000	190,000	<10K	<10K	340,000	<10K	33,590,000
Vanuatu	250,000	<10K	<10K	<10K	<10K	50,000	<10K	300,000
Venezuela	25,060,000	10,000	2,770,000	<10K	<10K	590,000	<10K	28,440,000
Vietnam	8,170,000	70,000	66,370,000	40,000	22,580,000	850,000	<10K	98,080,000
Western Sahara	<10K	550,000	<10K	<10K	<10K	<10K	<10K	550,000
Yemen	20,000	36,090,000	20,000	<10K	<10K	<10K	<10K	36,130,000
Zambia	18,730,000	100,000	10,000	<10K	<10K	220,000	<10K	19,060,000
Zimbabwe	13,540,000	80,000	1,640,000	<10K	<10K	260,000	<10K	15,530,000

== See also ==
- Religion
- Faith
- Theocracy
- Buddhism by country
- Christianity by country (Catholic Church by country, Protestantism by country, Eastern Orthodoxy by country and Oriental Orthodoxy by country)
- Hinduism by country
- Islam by country
- Judaism by country or Jewish population by country
- List of religious populations
- Importance of religion by country
- List of countries by irreligion
- Sikhism by country
- Religion and geography
- State religion
