= Spiritual Baptist =

Religion

The Spiritual Baptist faith is a syncretic Afro-Caribbean religion that originated among Afro-Caribbean communities in the plantations of the former British West Indies, particularly in Grenada, Saint Vincent and the Grenadines, Tobago, and the Virgin Islands. It blends Christianity with traditional African beliefs and practices. Despite its unique rituals and traditions, followers of the Spiritual Baptist faith identify fully as Christians.

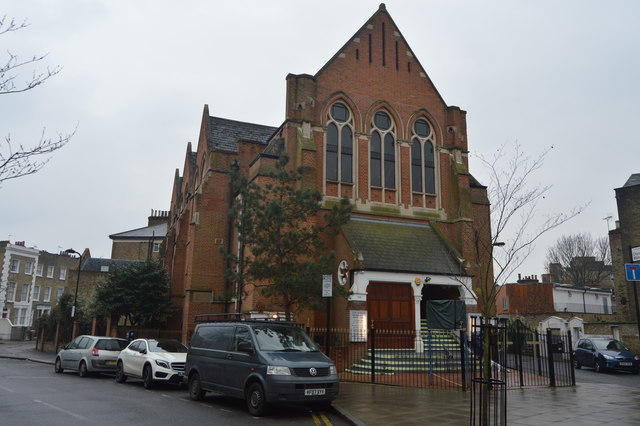
Stoke Newington Tantarian Spiritual Baptist Church

The Baptist faith has a different beginning in the nation of Trinidad, as unlike the spiritual baptist tradition in the other countries where the religion developed in the plantations where the enslaved were sent, the religion in Trinidad was brought into the country by the Merikins, former American slaves who were recruited by the British to fight, as the Corps of Colonial Marines, against the Americans during the War of 1812. After the end of the war, these ex-slaves were settled in Trinidad, to the east of the Mission of Savannah Grande (now known as Princes Town) in six villages, since then called the Company Villages.

These American settlers brought with them the Baptist faith of the Second Great Awakening combined with, in the case of those from Georgia, the Gullah culture. With the coming of missionaries of the Baptist Missionary Society from Great Britain, the Baptist faith in the Company Villages was much affected, but despite the ensuing schism between the so-called London Baptists and the rest, the Baptist congregations of the Company Villages, even including those with Gullah origins, retained so little visible African influence in their practice that John Hackshaw was able to give a different view of the Baptists in the north of the country:

"While those that settled in the 'Company Villages' were exposed to the Baptist Missionary Society's influence, those that settled in the North practiced their beliefs as brought from America with the inclusion of African religious practice and beliefs joined by those they met here which blossomed into the group now known as 'Spiritual Baptists'."

The faith expanded to Barbados in 1957 as the Sons of God Apostolic Spiritual Baptists movement. It now ranks as one of two indigenous religions in the country, the other being the Rastafari religion. Archbishop Granville Williams, who was born in Barbados, lived for 16 years in Trinidad and Tobago, where he witnessed the local Spiritual Baptists. Becoming enthusiastic about the Trinidadian movement, he asserted that he had seen a vision and heard the voice of God. Upon returning to Barbados he held the first open-air meeting in Oistins, Christ Church. Due to a well received response in Barbados, he quickly established the Jerusalem Apostolic Spiritual Baptist Church in Ealing Grove. This church was quickly followed by Zion at Richmond Gap. As of 1999 the following in Barbados had reached around 1,900 and the Jerusalem church had been rebuilt to seat 3,000.

== Name ==
The local name of the Spiritual Baptist in Trinidad are called the Shouters which derives from the characteristic practice of the religion. Followers are very vocal in singing, praying, and preaching. However, shouter is seen as a derogatory term and the term spiritual is preferred due to the practice of invoking the Holy Spirit during worship.

Spiritual Baptists in St Vincent are locally called the shakers due to their practice of invoking the Holy Spirit during their praise and worship. Vincentian Baptists are also known colloquially as 'Converted', speaking to them being converted to Christianity during slavery.

== Religious focus ==
The activities of the Spiritual Baptists in Trinidad and Tobago were prohibited in 1917 by the Shouter Prohibition Ordinance, which was eventually repealed in 1951. The late opposition parliamentarian Ashford Sinanan moved to repeal the ordinance under the PNM government and was successful. Today Spiritual Baptists can practise their religion freely. The United National Congress granted them a national holiday and also gave them land on which to establish their headquarters.

== Typical attire ==
The colours of the headdress or clothes vary and represent the 'spiritual cities', the saints with which the individual most relates, or various qualities of belief.

=== Males ===
Men can wear a headwrap however the very top of the head is usually left uncovered. Men tend to wear a gown or short cassocks. Persons of higher rank (Shepherds, Reverends, Bishops, etc.) can wear a surplice over the gown.

=== Females ===
- Headtie – As mentioned in the Bible at 1 Corinthians 11:13, the dress, the apron, and cords, sashes, and or a belt as given in the Faith and are revealed as the individual increases knowledge along their spiritual journey.

== Holiday ==
In 1996 the Government of Trinidad and Tobago granted a public holiday to the Spiritual Baptist faith, to be celebrated on 30 March, called Spiritual Baptist/Shouter Liberation Day, in memory of the struggle and in recognition of the repeal of the prohibition law. Trinidad and Tobago is the only country that celebrates a public holiday for the Spiritual Baptist faith.

== Shango Baptists ==
Shango Baptists was created in Trinidad and only practiced in Trinidad. It has no relation to the spiritual baptist religion. Shango is the practice of the Trinidad Orisha religion. In Trinidad, Orisha is also called Shango, and the term "Shango Baptist" is sometimes used to describe worshipers who are involved with both Spiritual Baptism and Orisha/Shango. The term "Shango Baptist" has come to have negative connotations for some worshippers of both Spiritual Baptism and Orisha/Shango, who argue that those who say "Shango Baptist" conflate the two religions, when in fact they are completely separate religions. As some have said, "There is no thing as Shango Baptist. Shango is Shango. Baptist is Baptist". Others say that Shango Baptists simply "wear two hats"; their mixture of "Baptist and Orisha practices" is a result of similar oppression by colonial authorities in Trinidad.

In practice, the Trinidad Orisha religion is not connected with the Spiritual Baptist. Orisha worship services are not similar to and not held at the same locations as Spiritual Baptist churches.

== Places of worship ==
=== Grenada ===
- Children Of The Light Spiritual Baptist International Archdiocese Inc. (La Sagesse St. David's)
- Mt. Paran S.B. Church (Grand Anse Vally)
- Faith Deliverance S.B. Church (Woodlands)
- Mt. Calvary S.B. Church (River Road)
- Mt. Olive S.B. Church (Prospect)
- Mt. Zion S.B. Church (Mt. Rodney)
- Rock In The Weary Land S.B. Church (Coals Gap)
- St Ann's Mystical Healing Chapel (Marigot, St John)

=== Barbados ===
- The Cathedral Church of Jerusalem – Ealing Grove, Christ Church
- Beulah Temple – Bishops, St. Lucy
- Zion Apostolic Temple – Richmond Gap, St. Michael
- Jeremiah Spiritual Baptist Church, Enterprise Main Road, Christ Church

=== Canada ===
- Sacred Heart Spiritual Baptist Church in Montreal, Quebec
- St Francis N.E.S.B.F Archdiocese of Canada Toronto, Ontario
- The Lion Of Judah Spiritual Baptist Old School Church
- St. Theresa's Well of Life Spiritual Baptist Tabernacle Inc
- The Council of Spiritual Baptist Elders of Canada
- St catharine Sacred Heart Spiritual Baptist Church
- Mount Moriah LightHouse Prayer and Healing Tabernacle Spiritual Baptist Church
- Jeremiah House of Prayer and Truth Spiritual Baptist Church
- Sea of Grace Healing School Outreach Ministries

=== Saint Vincent and the Grenadines ===
- Mt. Olivet S.B. Church, (Layou)
- St, Bethel S.B. Church, (Mt. Carmel)
- St. Joseph S.B. Church
- St. Mary's S.B. Church
- Mount Zion S.B. Church (RoseHall)

=== Trinidad and Tobago ===
- Mt Prizgar Spiritual Baptist Church, Lp#1103 E.M.Rd, Manzanilla
- Holy Faith Spiritual Baptist Tabernacle
- Faith International Baptist Convention
- St. Benedict Baptist Church, La Romaine
- St. Peter's House of Prayer, Morvant
- Mt Prizgar Spiritual Baptist Angels of God Archdiocese, Manzanilla
- St.Ann's Church of Spiritual Metaphysics, Mc Bean Couva.
- Mt Hope Spiritual Baptist Church,

Fort George Rd, St James

=== United States ===
- Ark of the Covenant Spiritual Baptist Church – Dorchester, Boston, Massachusetts
- Angels of the New Jerusalem S.B.C. – Baltimore, Maryland
- Bethlehem Church – Brooklyn, New York City, New York
- House of Esther Divine Ministries S.B.C; Brooklyn, New York City, New York
- Spirit Divine House of Melchizedek International S.C.Inc. Brooklyn New York
- Mt. Pisgah S.B.C – Dorchester, Boston, Massachusetts
- Pillar of Fire Church – Dorchester, Boston, Massachusetts
- Sacred Heart of Jesus International S.B.C. – Washington, D.C.
- Scarlet Cord Cathedral – New Bedford, Massachusetts
- St. John's S.B.C – Brooklyn, New York City, New York
- St. Catherine #2 S.B.C. – Brooklyn, New York City, New York
- United Congregation El Behel – Brooklyn, New York City, New York
- Zion Apostolic S.B.C – Hyde Park, Boston, Massachusetts
- Rock of Ages Spiritual Baptist Church(Lithonia Georgia)Panola Road
- Mt. Moriah Spiritual Church, Brooklyn, New York
- Mystical Order of Spiritual Baptist Inc, Brooklyn New York
- Good Shepherd spiritual Baptist church Brooklyn, New York

=== United Kingdom ===
- Mt Moriah S.B.C. London (UK)
- Melchisedec S.B.C. London (UK)

== See also ==
- Orisha
- Baptism with the Holy Spirit
- Religion in Trinidad and Tobago
