= The Church of Jesus Christ of Latter-day Saints in the Guianas =

- Area: Caribbean
- Members: 9,913 (2025)
- Districts: 3
- Branches: 19
- FamilySearch Centers: 8

The Church of Jesus Christ of Latter-day Saints in the Guianas refers to the Church of Jesus Christ of Latter-day Saints (LDS Church) and its members in the Guianas, primarily French Guiana, Guyana, and Suriname. This is part of the Caribbean Area which is more similar culturally and linguistically than the rest of South America.

The first branch (small congregation) was organized in Georgetown, Guyana in 1980. As of 31 December 2025, there were 9,913 members in 19 congregations.

== French Guiana ==
The Church of Jesus Christ of Latter-day Saints in French Guiana
- Area: Caribbean
- Members: 522 (2025)
- Branches: 1
- FamilySearch Centers: 1

The first members of the French Guiana were baptized in France and returned in the early 1980s. Elder Charles Didier of the Seventy visited in March 1988 and organized a group. Serge and Christie Bonnoit, the first converts in French Guiana, were baptised in November 1988. The first missionaries arrived in July 1989. In August 1989, the Cayenne Branch was created and had 23 members. The Cayenne meetinghouse was dedicated in March 1999. A Family History Center is located inside the meetinghouse.

== Guyana ==
The Church of Jesus Christ of Latter-day Saints in Guyana
- Area: Caribbean
- Members: 7,400 (2025)
- Districts: 2
- Branches: 12
- FamilySearch Centers: 4

Membership in Guyana
Year	Membership
1989*	50
1999	1,026
2009	3,935
2019	6,264
2025	7,400
*Membership was published as a rounded number.

The first missionaries entered Guyana was as senior missionary couple, Benjamin and Ruth Hudson, who arrived on August 19, 1988. Sacrament meeting was held the next month which included the Abdulla family who was previously baptized in Canada. The first convert, Luanna Abdulla, was baptized on October 23, 1988. The church was legally recognized in February 1989 and a branch in Georgetown was organized the following month. 23 members attended branch meetings when it was organized. 45 were in attendance in February 1990 when Elder M. Russell Ballard dedicated and blessed the land for missionary work. Greater numbers of missionaries were assigned to Guyana over the years following the dedication. Seminary and institute commenced in the mid-1990s. President Desmond Hoyte was a special guest at a luncheon on September 15, 1992 that was hosted by Elder Stephen D. Nadauld of the Seventy and the Trinidad Tobago Mission president.

In 2000, the first branch outside of Georgetown was organized in New Amsterdam. On 15 March 2003, the first meetinghouse was dedicated in Prashad Nagar, with 250 members present. On December 21, 2003, the Georgetown Guyana District was organized. In 2009, Linden became the first city in the interior to open for missionary work.

In September 2009, the Guyanese government requested the Church to remove foreign missionaries who were claimed to have expired missionary visas. Missionaries reported that they were incarcerated for one day due to alleged visa violations. The Guyanese government enforced a new limit on the number of foreign missionaries able to serve in Guyana to around twenty. Later that month, the Church withdrew about forty of the sixty missionaries serving in Guyana. Local members were provided with the opportunity to serve as full-time missionary companions in order to keep proselyting areas open, but this approach was not sustained. Government officials expressed concerns that the Church had a larger missionary force than most Christian churches in Guyana notwithstanding the comparatively small number of Latter-day Saints in the country.

Interweave Solutions partnered with The Church of Jesus Christ of Latter-Day Saints in 2014 to provide business training to its members in Guyana. After measurable success the First Lady of Guyana made it a key part of her office's agenda. In 2016, Elder Dale G. Renlund attended a district conference in Georgetown. In 2017, the First Lady, Mrs. Sandra Granger spoke to the youth at their youth conference on July 1, 2017, encouraging them to embrace education and instill moral values.

=== Humanitarian Efforts ===
The Church has conducted 170 humanitarian and development projects in Guyana since 1988. Most of these projects have been community projects although emergency response, maternal and newborn care, refugee response, vision care, and wheelchair donations have been provided. In 2011, a senior missionary couple was assigned to Georgetown to help the unemployed find sustainable employment. Between 2007 and 2012, the value of church humanitarian aid projects was US$18,047,345. In May 2019, Close to $1 Million US dollars in food was given to Guyana's Civil Defence Commission (CDC). In May 2020, the Civil Defense Commission (CDC) received $20Million worth of food and hygienic supplies from the Church of Jesus Christ of Latter-day Saints to assist those affected by COVID-19.

=== Districts and Congregations ===
As of May 2025, Guyana had the following districts and congregations:

Berbice Guyana District

- Corriverton Branch
- East Canje Branch (FHC)
- New Amsterdam Branch
- Rose Hall Branch
- Rosignol Branch

Georgetown Guyana District

- Demerara Branch
- Diamond Branch
- Garden Park Branch
- Georgetown Branch (FHC)
- La Grange Branch (FHC)
- Linden Branch (FHC)
- Tuschen Branch

All branches have their own meetinghouse. Congregations in a district are called branches, regardless of size.

District Centers (District offices) are located at the East Canje Branch and La Grange Branch Buildings.

Family History Centers (FHC) are located at East Canje Branch, Georgetown Branch, La Grange Branch, and Linden Branch buildings.

An Employment Resources Center is located in a Georgetown meetinghouse.

== Suriname ==
The Church of Jesus Christ of Latter-day Saints in Suriname
- Area: Caribbean
- Members: 1,887 (2024)
- Districts: 1
- Branches: 6
- FamilySearch Centers: 3

Membership in Suriname
Year	Membership
1989*	100
1999	454
2009	1,162
2019	1,747
2025	1,991
*Membership was published as a rounded number.

The first baptism in Suriname was Lisa Bills, a child of record baptism (baptised child of member parents), who was baptised in August 1967. The first missionaries arrived in October 1988. In early 1989, there were sixteen attending church services. On 26 March 1989, Easter Sunday, the first converts Eleni Treonosimitoe and Maudi Treonosimitoe, were baptised. A Branch was organized in Paramaribo in November 1989.

In February 1990, Elder M. Russell Ballard of the Quorum of the Twelve Apostles visited Suriname. The Paramaribo chapel was dedicated in July 2001. In September 2002, the Paramaribo Branch divided to create the Wanica Branch

=== District and Congregations ===
As of May 2025, Suriname had the following district and congregations:

Paramaribo Suriname District

- Koewarasan Branch
- Latour Branch
- Nieuw Amsterdam Branch
- Paramaribo Branch
- Tammenga Branch
- Wanica Branch

Congregations in the district are called branches, regardless of size. The Wanica Branch and Latour Branches share the same meetinghouse.

The District Center (District offices) are located in the Tammenga Branch Meetinghouse.

Family History Centers are located in the Tammenga and Wanica Meetinghouses.

== Missions ==
In 1988, formal missionary work started in Port of Spain under the direction of the West Indies Mission in September 1983. Guyana was assigned to the Trinidad Tobago Mission when it was created 1 July 1991, and was reassigned to the West Indies Mission upon the closure of the Trinidad and Tobago Mission in 1994. The Barbados Bridgetown Mission was created in 2015 and was later renamed the Trinidad Port of Spain Mission. In 2023, the mission headquarters was moved and renamed Guyana Georgetown Mission.

French Guiana is part of the Barbados Bridgetown Mission which serves other French-speaking territories in the Caribbean Area.

== Temples ==
There are no temples in the Guianas. Guyana is currently located within the Manaus Brazil Temple District. French Guiana and Suriname are assigned to the Belém Brazil Temple district.

Most members in Guyana and Suriname travel by plane to visit the Panama City Panama Temple, due to the difficulty of traveling south into Brazil.

== See also ==
- The Church of Jesus Christ of Latter-day Saints in the Lesser Antilles
- Religion in French Guiana
- Religion in Guyana
- Religion in Suriname
