= The Church of Jesus Christ of Latter-day Saints in the Lesser Antilles =

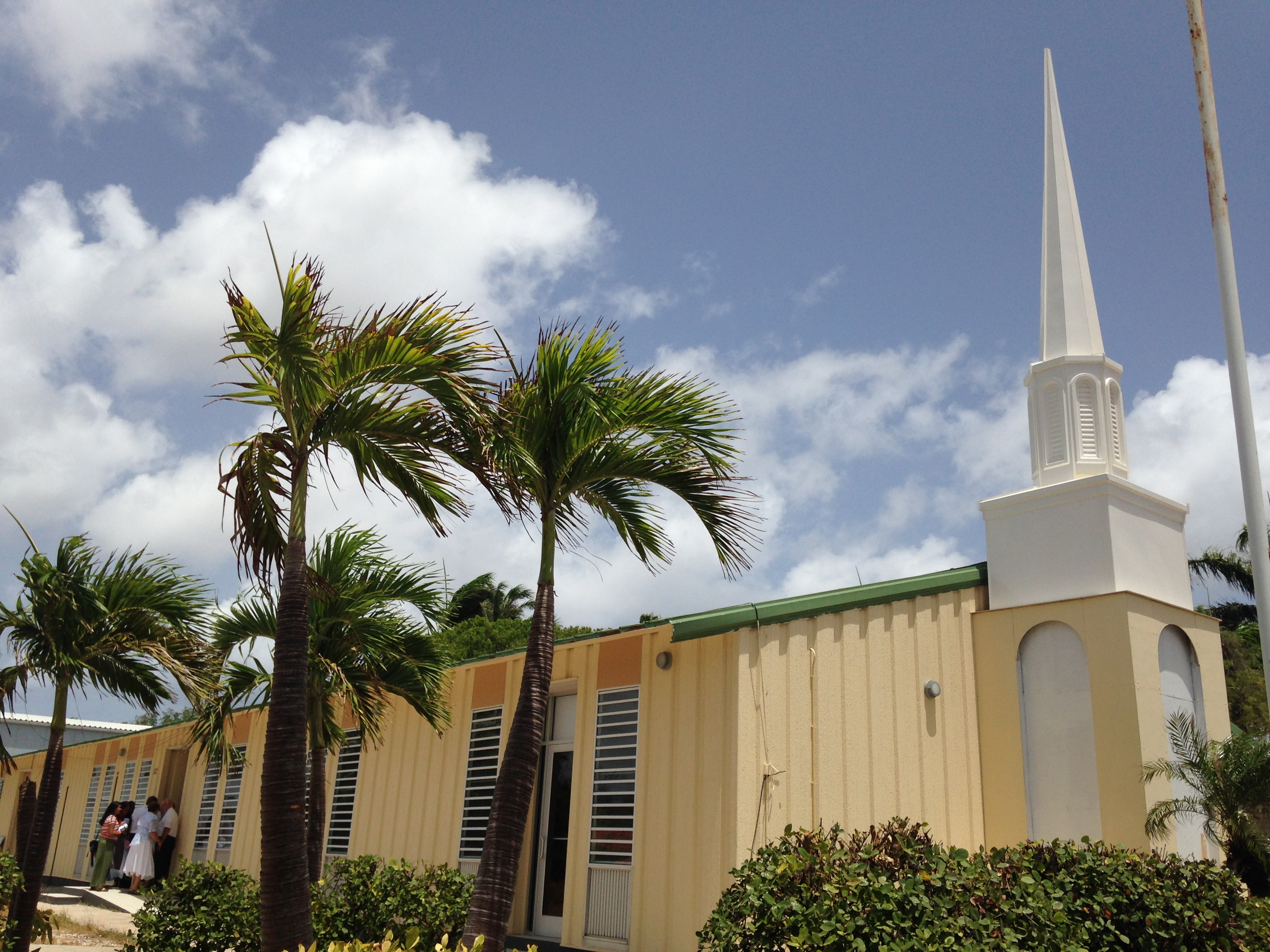
- An LDS Church meetinghouse in Curacao
- Area: Caribbean
- Members: 10,515 (2025)
- Stakes: 1
- Districts: 4
- Wards: 5
- Branches: 29
- Total congregations: 34
- Missions: 1
- FamilySearch Centers: 15

The Church of Jesus Christ of Latter-day Saints in the Lesser Antilles refers to the Church of Jesus Christ of Latter-day Saints (LDS Church) and its members in the Lesser Antilles. The Lesser Antilles is part of the Caribbean Area and is part of three missions. As of 2025, the LDS Church reported 10,515 members in 34 congregations in the Lesser Antilles.

== Statistics ==
Country/Territory	Mission	Stake / District	Members	Congregations	FHC
Antigua and Barbuda	Puerto Rico San Juan	Lesser Antilles North District	366	1	1
Aruba	Guyana Georgetown	ABC Islands District	686	2	2
Barbados	Barbados Bridgetown	Christ Church Barbados District	1,082	3	1
Bonaire (Note: Estimated 2015 membership information shown. Branch still exist as of May 2023.)	Guyana Georgetown	ABC Islands District	80	1	1
British Virgin Islands (Note: 2018 membership and congregational information shown. Branch still exist as of May 2023.)	Puerto Rico San Juan	Lesser Antilles North District	138	1	0
Curaçao	Guyana Georgetown	ABC Islands District	639	1	1
Dominica	Puerto Rico San Juan	Lesser Antilles North District	180	1	0
Grenada	Barbados Bridgetown	Kingstown St Vincent District	429	1	0
Guadeloupe	Barbados Bridgetown	Guadeloupe District	628	3	1
Martinique	Barbados Bridgetown	Guadeloupe District	273	1	1
Saint Kitts and Nevis	Puerto Rico San Juan	Lesser Antilles North District	292	1	1
Saint Lucia	Barbados Bridgetown	Kingstown St Vincent District	435	2	2
Saint Vincent and the Grenadines	Barbados Bridgetown	Kingstown St Vincent District	767	3	1
Sint Maarten	Barbados Bridgetown	Guadeloupe District	358	1	0
Trinidad and Tobago	Guyana Georgetown	Port of Spain Trinidad Stake	3,458	10	2
United States Virgin Islands	Puerto Rico San Juan	Lesser Antilles North District	704	2	0

== Antigua and Barbuda ==
The LDS Church reported 366 members in a single congregation in Antigua and Barbuda for year-end 2025. The St. John's branch was created on January 15, 1985, and serves the entire island nation. A family history center is located in the meetinghouse in St. John.

== Aruba ==
LDS Church Locations in Aruba as of October 2025
Orange = District Center and meetinghouse
Purple = Meetinghouse
(FHC) = Family History Center

The LDS Church reported 686 members in two congregations in Aruba for year-end 2025. Congregations are located in Oranjestad and San Nicolás. Family history centers are located at both meetinghouses. Oranjestad is the district center for the ABC Islands District which covers Aruba, Bonaire, and Curaçao. It is part of the Trinidad Port of Spain Mission.

== Barbados ==
Membership in Barbados
Year	Membership
1985	180
1989*	400
1999	568
2009	667
2019	1,089
2025	1,082
*Membership was published as a rounded number.

LDS Church Locations as of May 2025
Red = Barbados Bridgetown Mission Office
Orange = District Center and meetinghouse
Purple = meetinghouse
(FHC) = Family History Center

The LDS Church reported 1,082 members in three congregations in Barbados as of year-end 2025. A family history center is located in the Les Abymes meetinghouse.

=== History ===
International Church leaders visited Barbados as early as the 1950s, but the first convert baptism did not occur until 1978, which came as a result of a convert from Scotland sharing his faith with friends. The Puerto Rico San Juan Mission opened Barbados to missionary work in September 1979. The following month, the first congregation was organized in Christ Church. Seminary and institute were both operating by 1983. Elder Marvin J. Ashton dedicated the islands of the West Indies for missionary work in 1988.

==== Humanitarian efforts ====
The Church has conducted twelve humanitarian projects since 1985, including eight community projects and four wheelchair donation initiatives.

=== Districts and congregations ===
As of May 2025, Barbados had the following district and congregations:

Christ Church Barbados District

- Black Rock Branch
- Christ Church Branch
- Oistins Branch

Congregations not part of a stake are called branches, regardless of size.

== Bonaire ==
The LDS Church reported 80 members in a single congregation in Bonaire for year-end 2015. The Bonaire Branch meetinghouse is located in Kralendijk. A family history center is located in the meetinghouse. The Bonaire Branch is part of the ABC Islands District which is part of the Trinidad Port of Spain Mission.

== Curaçao ==
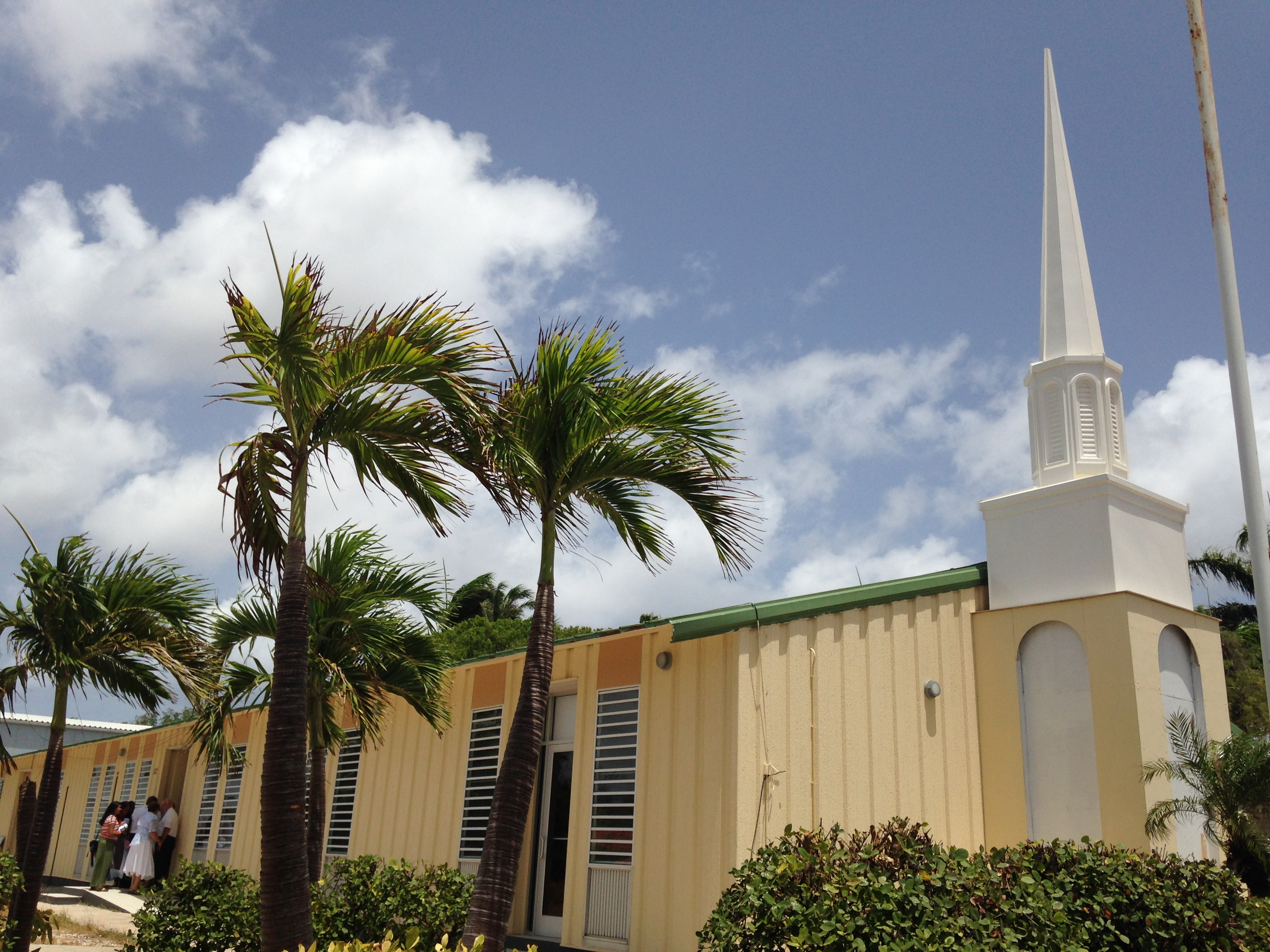
The Church of Jesus Christ of Latter-day Saints in Curacao.

The LDS Church reported 639 members in a single congregation in Curaçao for year-end 2025. The Curaçao Branch meetinghouse is located in Willemstad. A family history center is located in the meetinghouse. The Curaçao Branch is part of the ABC Islands District which is part of the Trinidad Port of Spain Mission.

== Dominica ==
The LDS Church reported 180 members in a single congregation in Dominica for year-end 2025. The Portsmouth Branch was created on January 4, 2007, and serves the entire island nation.

== Grenada ==
The LDS Church reported 429 members in a single congregation in Grenada for year-end 2025. The St. George's Branch was created September 3, 1985 and serves the entire island nation. Grenada is part of the Kingstown St Vincent District in the Barbados Bridgetown Mission.

== Guadeloupe ==
LDS Church Locations in Guadeloupe as of October 2025
Orange = District Center and meetinghouse
Purple = meetinghouse
(FHC) = Family History Center

The LDS Church reported 628 members in three congregations in Guadeloupe as of year-end 2025. Congregations are located in Basse-Terre, Lamentin, and Les Abymes. A family history center is located in the Les Abymes meetinghouse. Les Abymes is the district center for the Guadeloupe District which serves congregations in French Guiana, Guadeloupe, Martinique, and Sint Maarten. It is part of the Barbados Bridgetown Mission.

== Martinique ==
The LDS Church reported 273 members in a single congregation in Martinique as of December 31, 2025. The Fort-de-France Branch was organized on October 10, 1985, and serves members throughout the island. A family history center is located in the Fort-de-France meetinghouse. The Fort-de-France Branch is part of the Guadeloupe District which is part of the Barbados Bridgetown Mission.

== Saint Kitts and Nevis ==
The LDS Church reported 292 members in a single congregation in Saint Kitts and Nevis as of December 31, 2025. The St Kitts Branch, organized September 10, 1985, meets in Basseterre and includes members from Saint Kitts and Nevis as well as Sint Eustatius. A family history center is located in the Basseterre meetinghouse. St Kitts Branch is part of the Lesser Antilles North District which is part of the Puerto Rico San Juan Mission.

== Saint Lucia ==
LDS Church Locations in Saint Lucia as of October 2025
Purple = meetinghouse
(FHC) = Family History Center

The LDS Church reported 435 members in two congregations in Saint Lucia for year-end 2025. Congregations are located in Castries and Vieux Fort. Family history centers are located in both meetinghouse. Saint Lucia is in the Kingstown St Vincent District which is part of the Barbados Bridgetown Mission.

== Saint Vincent and the Grenadines ==
LDS Church Locations in Saint Vincent as of October 2025
Orange = District Center and meetinghouse
Purple = meetinghouse
(FHC) = Family History Center

The LDS Church reported 767 members in three congregations in Saint Vincent and the Grenadines for year-end 2025. Congregations are located in Calliaqua, Georgetown, and Kingstown. A family history center is located in the Kingstown meetinghouse. Kingstown is the district center for the Kingstown St Vincent District which covers Grenada, St Lucia, and St Vincent. It is part of the Barbados Bridgetown Mission.

== Sint Maarten ==
The LDS Church reported 358 members in a single congregation in Sint Maarten as of December 31, 2025. The Philipsburg Branch was organized on November 26, 1985, and is located in the Guadeloupe District and is part of the Barbados Bridgetown Mission. The branch serves members in Anguilla, Saba, Saint Barthélemy, Saint Martin, and Sint Maarten. English, French, and Spanish are languages spoken in the branch.

== Trinidad and Tobago ==
The Church of Jesus Christ of Latter-day Saints in Trinidad and Tobago
- Area: Caribbean
- Members: 3,458 (2025)
- Stakes: 1
- Wards: 5
- Branches: 5
- Total congregations: 10
- FamilySearch Centers: 2

The Church of Jesus Christ of Latter-day Saints in Trinidad and Tobago refers to the Church of Jesus Christ of Latter-day Saints (LDS Church) and its members in Trinidad and Tobago. The church's Port of Spain Trinidad and Tobago Stake encompasses the entire country. A branch of the church was formed in 1980. In 2025, there were 3,458 members in 10 congregations.

=== History ===
Membership in Trinidad and Tobago
Year	Membership
1987	50
1989	200
1999	1,581
2009	2,489
2019	3,524
2025	3,458
*Membership was published as a rounded number.

LDS Church missionaries returning from South Africa in late 1940 stopped in Trinidad briefly and taught a congregation. Ezra Taft Benson, a member of the Quorum of Twelve, visited Trinidad during a Caribbean and South American tour in 1955 said a church member was serving as one of the secretaries of the consulate."

In 1974, Elizabeth Anne Rogers, a Trinidadian by birth, visited England and married LDS Church member Emil Paul Dopson while there. She was baptized two months later. They moved back to Trinidad in 1976. She wrote a letter to church president Spencer W. Kimball, requesting that full-time missionaries be sent to Trinidad. The Trinidad government allowed missionaries to enter the country. The first sacrament meeting was held in November 1976. Among the first converts in Trinidad were Lucy Josephine Payne and Blasil D. and Felicia Borde. They were baptized in 1977 by Daniel Rector and Michael Willis.

On June 5, 1980, the Trinidad Branch, located in Port of Spain, was organized with Errol O. Balfour as branch president, making it the first congregation in the nation. In the mid=1980s, missionaries organized a city-wide cross-country race. In 1987, Frank and Arline Talley, church representatives in Puerto Rico, organized a health fair in Trinidad to teach hygiene and principles from the Word of Wisdom.

Kevin Diaz, chief executive of the Boy Scouts of Trinidad and head of civil service training for the government, visited the fair, learned more about the LDS Church and was later baptized. After he was baptized, he learned missionaries could only stay for short periods of time using tourist visas. Through government contacts, he arranged for as many as ten missionaries to stay for a period of one year at a time, and in special cases, longer. For 14 years and prior to retiring, he was manager of organization planning and development for British West Indian Airways. In addition to work and scouting, he served in Red Cross hurricane disaster relief. For his work in public service, he was awarded Member of the Most Excellent Order of the British Empire. After retirement, he served as first counselor to the president of the West Indies Mission and the newly created Trinidad and Tobago Mission. He also served as Church Educational System coordinator in the West Indies.

M. Russell Ballard, of the Quorum of the Twelve, visited Trinidad on February 22, 1990, along with Charles Didier, a member of the seventy, to bless the land. Seminary and institute began in the early 1990s. Church president Gordon B. Hinckley visited Trinidad on 20 May 2002 and addressed 900 members at the Cascadia Hotel conference center in St. Anns. Prior to the meeting, he met with Patrick Manning, then Prime Minister of the country. In 2006, the church's Caribbean Area was created and included Trinidad and Tobago. On March 1, 2009, Neil L. Andersen, of the Quorum of the Twelve, visited the country and presided over the organization of the Port of Spain Trinidad Stake. Elder Ulisses Soares visited members in Trinidad on February 21, 2019.

In August 2020, the church donated two hundred relief food hampers and one hundred and fifty (150) relief food hampers to NGO Living Waters Community.

=== Port of Spain Trinidad Stake ===
LDS Church Meetinghouse Locations as of May 2023
Green = Stake Center and meetinghouse
Purple = meetinghouse
(FHC) = Family History Center

On March 1, 2009, Neil L. Andersen created the Port of Spain Trinidad Stake. As of July 2025, this stake consisted of the following congregations:

- Arima Branch
- Chaguanas Branch
- Couva Ward
- Curepe Ward
- Port of Spain Ward
- San Fernando Ward
- Sangre Grande Ward
- Scarborough Branch

Two congregations (Curepe Ward and Port of Spain Ward) and the stake offices share the same meetinghouse in Port of Spain. The church's Family History Center in Port of Spain has family history and other historical information that includes births, marriages and deaths.

== Virgin Islands, British ==
The LDS Church has a single congregation in the British Virgin Islands. The Tortola Branch branch was created on August 8, 1999, and serves the entire British territory.

== Virgin Islands of the US ==
The LDS Church reported 704 members in two congregations in the United States Virgin Islands as of December 31, 2024. The St. Thomas Branch and St Croix Branch serves the entire US territory. Affiliate family history centers are located on both islands with a meetinghouse.

== Missions ==
=== Barbados Bridgetown Mission ===
Created in 1983, the West Indies Mission was originally headquartered in Barbados until 1994 when the mission relocated to Trinidad and Tobago. In 1988, the government restricted the number of missionary visas to 10, which required half of the missionaries assigned to Barbados to leave the country. In 2007, the Puerto Rico San Juan East Mission was organized and administered Barbados until the mission was discontinued in 2010. The West Indies Mission administered Barbados from 2010 until 2015 when the Barbados Bridgetown Mission was organized. The mission services most nations and dependencies in the Lesser Antilles, including Anguilla, Barbados, French Guiana, Grenada, Guadeloupe, Martinique, Saint Barthelemy, Saint Lucia, Saint-Martin/Sint Maarten, and Saint Vincent and the Grenadines. In 2018, Elder Dale G. Renlund dedicated Barbados for missionary work and attended a special district conference.

=== Guyana Georgetown Mission ===
In 1977, formal missionary work started in Port of Spain under the direction of the Venezuela Caracas Mission. Difficulty in obtaining missionary visas and restrictions on proselytizing limited missionary work until the late 1980s. The area was transferred to the West Indies Mission in September 1983. The first eighteen missionary visas were obtained in 1988, which increased to thirty-five a few years later. M. Russell Ballard dedicated Trinidad and Tobago for missionary work in February 1990. The Trinidad Tobago Mission was created 1 July 1991, discontinued in 1994, and reinstated in 2015. The church 34 foreign missionaries, while other denominations maintain between 5 and 10 foreign missionaries in the country. In 2023, the Trinidad Port of Spain mission was renamed the Guyana Georgetown Mission

Trinidad and Tobago is part of the Trinidad Port of Spain Mission, which also encompasses Aruba, Bonaire, Curaçao, Guyana, and Suriname.

== Temples ==
There are no temples in the Lesser Antilles. The San Juan Puerto Rico Temple serves Lesser Antilles North District. The Santo Domingo Dominican Republic Temple serves the remainder of the Lesser Antilles.

99. Santo Domingo Dominican Republic Temple; Official website; News & images	
Location: Announced: Groundbreaking: Dedicated: Size: Style:	Santo Domingo, Dominican Republic; 16 November 1993 by Gordon B. Hinckley; 18 August 1996 by Richard G. Scott; 17 September 2000 by Gordon B. Hinckley; 67,000 sq ft (6,200 m^{2}) on a 6.42-acre (2.60 ha) site Classic modern, single-spire design - designed by Scott Partnership and Church A&E Services
176. San Juan Puerto Rico Temple; Official website; News & images	
Location: Announced: Groundbreaking: Dedicated: Size:	San Juan, Puerto Rico; 7 October 2018 by Russell M. Nelson; 4 May 2019 by Walter F. González; 15 January 2023 by D. Todd Christofferson; 6,988 sq ft (649.2 m^{2}) on a 2.97-acre (1.20 ha) site

== See also ==
- Religion in Barbados
- Religion in Trinidad and Tobago
- The Church of Jesus Christ of Latter-day Saints in the Guianas
