= Spiritual Baptist/Shouter Liberation Day =

Public holiday in Trinidad and Tobago

Spiritual Baptist Shouter Liberation Day
- Observed by: Trinidad and Tobago; Spiritual Baptists
- Significance: Celebrates the repeal of laws banning the faith
- Date: 30 March
- Next time: 30 March 2027
- Frequency: Annual

Spiritual Shouter Baptist Liberation Day is an annual public holiday celebrated in Trinidad and Tobago on 30 March. The holiday commemorates the repeal on 30 March 1951 of the 1917 Shouter Prohibition Ordinance that prohibited the activities of the Shouter or Spiritual Baptist faith.

Trinidad and Tobago is the only country in the world that celebrates a public holiday for the Spiritual Baptist faith.

It is a very important event for the Spiritual Baptists in Trinidad.
