= Religion in Trinidad and Tobago =

Religion in Trinidad and Tobago (2011 census)
1. Christianity (55.2%)
2. Hinduism (18.2%)
3. Islam (5.00%)
4. Trinidad Orisha (0.90%)
5. Rastafari (0.30%)
6. Not Stated (11.1%)
7. None (2.20%)

Religion in Trinidad and Tobago, which is a multi-religious country, is classifiable as follows:

According to the 2011 census, the largest religious group was Christianity, with 55.2 percent of the population. This included Protestant Christians (with Anglicans, Presbyterians, Methodists, Evangelicals, Pentecostals, Shouter or Spiritual Baptists, and other Baptists) as well as Roman Catholics. Hindus accounted for 18.2 percent; Muslims for 5.0 percent. There was an Afro-Caribbean syncretic faith, the Orisha faith (formerly called Shangos), with 0.9 percent, and Rastafaris with 0.3 percent. The "Other Religions" category accounted for 7.0 percent, and "None/not shared" for 13.3.

The fastest-growing groups were a host of American-style Evangelical and fundamentalist churches thought of as Pentecostal by Trinidadians. The Church of Jesus Christ of Latter-day Saints (the largest form of Mormonism) had also expanded its presence in the country in the 1980s and 1990s. It reported 3,524 members in 9 congregations in 2019.

According to the 2011 Census, 33.4% of the population was Protestant (including 12.0% Pentecostal, 5.7% Anglican, 4.1% Seventh-day Adventist, 2.5% Presbyterian or Congregational, 1.2% Baptist, and 0.1% Methodist), 21.6% Roman Catholic, 18.2% Hindu and 5.0% Muslim. A small number of individuals subscribed to traditional Caribbean religions with African roots, such as the Spiritual Baptists (sometimes called Shouter Baptists) (5.7%) and Orisha devotees (0.1%). Smaller groups included Jehovah's Witnesses (1.5%) and the "unaffiliated" (2.2%). There is also a small Buddhist community.

== Christianity ==
=== Catholicism ===
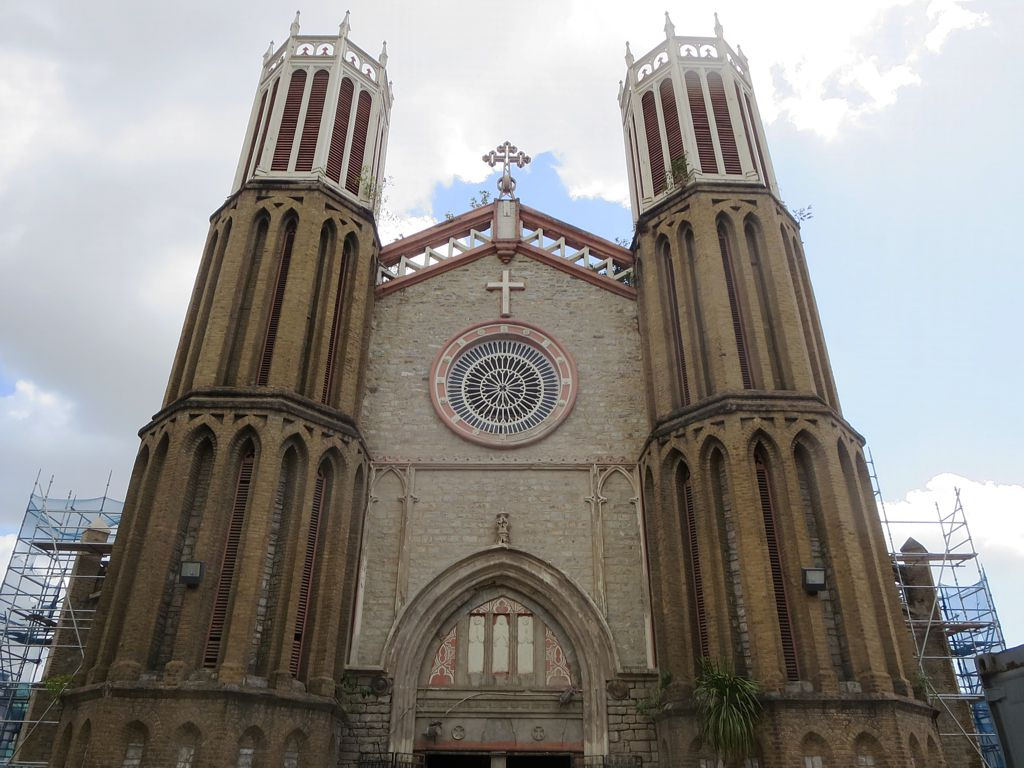
The Cathedral of the Immaculate Conception in Port of Spain.

=== Protestantism ===
==== Seventh-day Adventists ====
The Caribbean Union Conference of the Seventh-day Adventist Church recognizes 620 churches holding a membership of 236, 257 Adventists in Trinidad and Tobago, as of October 3, 2016. Because Seventh-day Adventists consider spiritual well-being to be holistic, there are notable contributions to the healthcare system, such as the Community Hospital of Seventh-day Adventists in Port of Spain, Trinidad. The University of the Southern Caribbean (formerly Caribbean Union College) is a Seventh-day Adventist educational facility providing Christian education to undergraduate and graduate students on the island of Trinidad.

== Hinduism ==
The Hanuman Temple at Carapichaima

- Sanātanī, the orthodox sect being the largest and most dominant Hindu sect in Trinidad and Tobago, with notable influence from Ramanandi (Bairagi) Vaishnavism, Shaivism (Daśanāmi Sampradaya (Gosines)/Natha Sampradaya/Aghoras), Smartism, Shaktism, Sauraism, Vedanta (incl. Vishishtadvaita), and other Hindu traditions
  - Sanatan Dharma Maha Sabha, the major Sanātanī group in Trinidad and Tobago
  - SWAHA International, a smaller Sanātanī group
- Arya Samaj
  - Arya Pratinidhi Sabha
  - Vedic Mission
- Kabir Panth
- Seunariani (Sieunarini/Siewnaraini/Shiv Narayani)
  - Shiva Dharam Sabha, formerly known as the Seunarine Dharam Sabha
- Kali Mai Dharam (Madrasi)
- Chinmaya Mission
- Bharat Sevashram Sangha
- Sathya Sai Baba movement
- Jagadguru Kripalu Parishat (Radha Madhav)
- ISKCON
- Ganapathi Sachchidananda movement
- Divine Life Society
- Brahma Kumaris
- Blue Star

== Islam ==
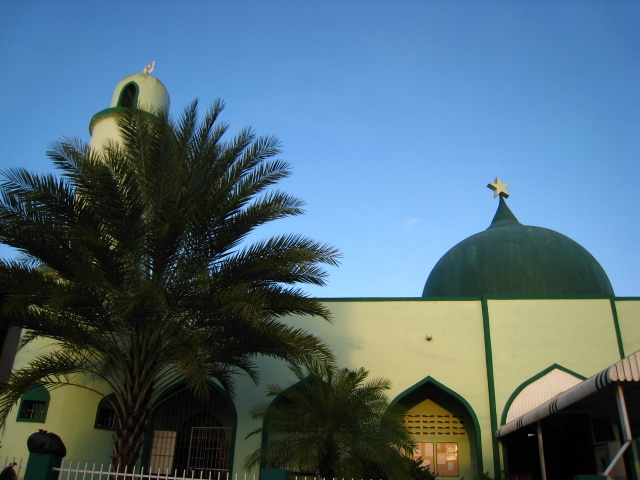
A mosque in Montrose, Chaguanas

- Anjuman Sunnat-ul-Jamaat Association
- Trinidad Muslim League
- Tackveeyatul Islamic Association
- Ahmadiyya Anjuman Isha'at Islam Trinidad and Tobago Inc.
- Ahmadiyya Muslim Community
- Tobago Muslim Association
- Sunni-Shia Relations

== Afro-Caribbean syncretic groups ==
- Spiritual Baptist
  - National Evangelical Spiritual Baptist
  - West Indies Spiritual Sacred Order
  - Royal Priesthood Spiritual Baptist Archdiocese of Trinidad and Tobago and the Western Hemisphere (under the Leadership of the Archbishop & Founder Addelon Braveboy, the Episkopos Bishop of all the Churches of the Royal Priesthood)
  - King of Kings Spiritual Baptist, Faith Ministries International Church of the Royal Priesthood
  - Solomon Healing Temple, Church of the Royal Priesthood.
  - St Francis Divine Healing Temple, Church of the Royal Priesthood
  - St Philomena Mystical Court, Church of the Royal Priesthood
- Santería
- Orisha also known as Shango or Ifá
  - Ojubo Orisa Omolu - Ose'tura Ifa Temple of Light.
- Rastafari

== Baháʼí Faith ==
The Baháʼí Faith in Trinidad and Tobago begins with a mention by `Abdu'l-Bahá, then head of the religion, in 1916, when the Caribbean was among the places Baháʼís should take the religion. The first Baháʼí to visit came in 1927, while pioneers arrived by 1956, and the first Baháʼí Local Spiritual Assembly was elected in 1957. In 1971, the first Baháʼí National Spiritual Assembly was elected. A count of the community then noted 27 assemblies, with Baháʼís living in 77 locations. Since then, Baháʼís have participated in several projects for the benefit of the wider community, and in 2005/10, various sources report that nearly 1.2% of the country, about 10,000 to 16,000 citizens, are Baháʼís.

== Judaism ==
The introduction of Judaism in Trinidad and Tobago dates back to the 17th century, when several Jewish merchants from Suriname settled on the islands in the 1660s, during the time when they were still under Spanish control. By the 1790s, after the islands had passed into British control, there were no records of the Jewish community remaining.

In the 19th century, a small number of Sephardic Jewish families from Curaçao settled in Trinidad but left no trace of an organized community. In the late 1930s, an estimated 600 East European Jews settled in Trinidad, mainly in Port of Spain, escaping the growth of Nazism in Europe. The settlers established synagogues in rented houses in the capital and consecrated a Jewish cemetery. After World War II, the majority of Trinidadian Jews migrated to the United States, Israel, and Canada. In 2007, an estimated 55 Jews lived in Trinidad and Tobago.

== Freedom of religion ==
The constitution of Trinidad and Tobago establishes the freedom of religion and prohibits religious discrimination. An anti-blasphemy law is part of the legal code but is not enforced.

Religious groups must register with the government in order to be able to perform marriages, sponsor missionaries, or accept tax-exempt donations.

Voluntary religious instruction is available as part of the public school curriculum. The government subsidizes religious private schools affiliated with Christian, Muslim, and Hindu groups.

In 2017, Trinidad and Tobago set a uniform minimum marriage age of 18 years. Previously, different age limits were enforced for different religious groups. While many organizations (and particularly religiously affiliated women's organizations) welcomed this change, some religious organizations such as the orthodox Hindu organization Sanatan Dharma Maha Sabha stated that they would oppose the law on the grounds that it infringes on religious freedom and their view that girls 16-17 who are pregnant should be able to marry the father of their child.

The government of Trinidad and Tobago hosts the Inter-Religious Organization, an interfaith coordinating committee with representatives from 25 religious groups, including Christian, Muslim, Hindu, Orisha and Baháʼí groups. Chaplains from the various religious denominations present in Trinidad Tobago are able to provide religious services to inmates in prisons.

The Government of Trinidad and Tobago provides substantial subventions to religious groups. In 2003 the government provided TT$ 420,750 to religious groups.

In 2023, the country was scored 4 out of 4 for religious freedom.
