= Religion in Suriname =

Religion in Suriname (2012 census)
1. Protestantism (26.7%)
2. Catholicism (21.6%)
3. Jehovah's Witnesses (1.20%)
4. Hinduism (22.3%)
5. Islam (13.9%)
6. Winti (1.80%)
7. Kejawen (0.80%)
8. Other religion (0.90%)
9. None (7.50%)
10. Not stated (3.20%)

Religion in Suriname is characterized by a range of religious beliefs and practices due to its ethnic diversity. The government is vocally supportive of religious diversity and tolerance, and these attitudes are present in general society as well. According to the most recent census (2012), 48.4 percent of the population is Christian (the largest groups being Pentecostalism, the Moravian Church, and the Catholic Church), 22.3 percent is Hindu, 13.9 percent is Muslim, 1.8 percent follows Winti, and 0.8 percent is Javanism (mainly adhered to Kejawèn Javanism). In addition 2.1 percent of the population follows other faiths (including Jehovah's Witnesses), 7.5 percent are atheist or agnostic, and 3.2 percent did not answer the question about their religion.

Indigenous religions are practiced by the Amerindian and Afro-descendant Maroon populations. Amerindians, found principally in the interior and to a lesser extent in coastal areas, practice shamanism, worship of all living things, and their rites are led by medicine men, or piaiman. Maroons, who inhabit the interior, worship nature through a practice that has no special name, and they also worship their ancestors through a rite called Winti. Citizens of Amerindian and Maroon origin who classify themselves as Christian often simultaneously follow indigenous religious customs, with the acknowledgment of their Christian church leaders.

The negligible Jewish community numbers 181, and there are also small numbers of Baháʼís and Buddhists. The Church of Jesus Christ of Latter-day Saints (LDS Church) claimed 1,797 members in six congregations in 2022. Other groups include the Ahmadiyya Muslim Community and the World Islamic Call Society. At the start of the 21st century, Guido Robles, a prominent Jewish businessman in Paramaribo, quipped, "No religion in Suriname has any problem with any other religion, all the problems are caused by the politicians."

In 2017, many political parties, including six of the eight governing coalition parties, had strong ethnic ties, and members tended to adhere to or practice one faith. For example, within the governing coalition, the majority of members of the mostly ethnic-National Party of Suriname (NPS) were Protestant, most members of the mostly ethnic-Indian Progressive Reform Party were Hindu, and those of the mostly ethnic-Javanese Pertjaja Luhur Party tended to be Muslim. However, parties had no requirement that political party leaders or members adhere to a particular religion.

== Demography ==
=== Religion for Suriname in 2004 and 2012 ===
The religious demography of Suriname as per the 2004 Census is as follows:

| Religion | 2004 | | 2012 | |
| Religion | Number | % | Number | % |
|---|---|---|---|---|
| Christianity | 200,744 | 40.7 | 262,320 | 48.4 |
| Hinduism | 98,240 | 19.9 | 120,623 | 22.3 |
| Islam | 66,307 | 13.5 | 75,053 | 13.9 |
| Other or none | 50,334 | 10.2 | 66,560 | 12.3 |
| Religion not stated | 77,204 | 15.7 | 17,082 | 3.2 |
| Total population | 492,829 | 100.0 | 541,638 | 100.0 |

=== Religion by province in 2004 ===
| Religion | Suriname | Para- maribo (7) | Wanica (10) | Nickerie (5) | Coronie (3) | Sara- macca (8) | Comme- wijne (2) | Maro- wijne (4) | Para (6) | Broko- pondo (1) | Sipali- wini (9) |
|---|---|---|---|---|---|---|---|---|---|---|---|
| Christian | 40.7% | 47.9% | 29.7% | 20.6% | 75.0% | 23.5% | 22.0% | 58.7% | 56.5% | 52.4% | 35.2% |
| Hindu | 19.9% | 13.8% | 39.9% | 43.2% | 2.2% | 44.6% | 24.5% | 0.9% | 4.9% | 0.4% | 0.3% |
| Islam | 13.5% | 9.4% | 21.7% | 22.5% | 11.0% | 18.8% | 40.4% | 6.8% | 11.3% | 0.2% | 0.1% |
| Tribal + Other | 5.8% | 3.8% | 3.4% | 0.7% | 1.6% | 3.0% | 4.2% | 11.5% | 6.8% | 16.8% | 26.8% |
| None | 4.4% | 3.9% | 2.7% | 0.6% | 1.8% | 1.4% | 1.5% | 4.7% | 8.1% | 11.8% | 14.8% |
| Not Known | 15.7% | 21.1% | 2.6% | 12.4% | 8.4% | 8.6% | 7.3% | 17.4% | 12.5% | 18.5% | 22.9% |

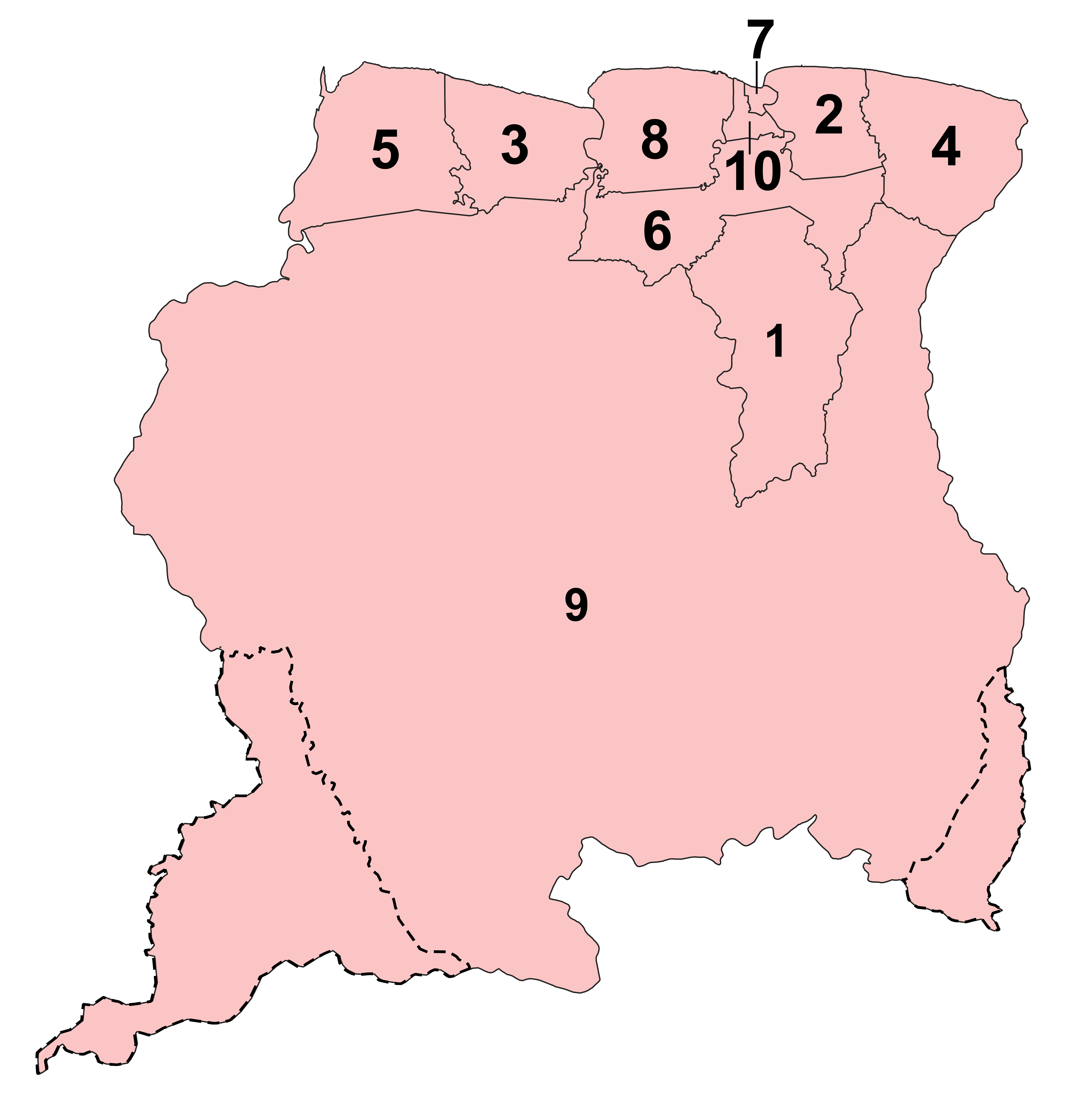
Districts of Suriname

=== 2012 data by denomination ===
| Denomination | 2012 census | |
| Denomination | Number | % |
|---|---|---|
| Catholic Church | 117,261 | 21.6 |
| Pentecostalism (Full Gospel) | 60,530 | 11.18 |
| Moravian Church | 60,420 | 11.16 |
| Jehovah's Witnesses | 6,622 | 1.2 |
| Calvinism | 4,018 | 0.7 |
| Lutheranism | 2,811 | 0.5 |
| Other forms of Christianity | 17,280 | 3.2 |
| Sanatani Hindus | 97,311 | 18 |
| Arya Samaj Hindus | 16,661 | 3.1 |
| Other forms of Hinduism | 6,651 | 1.2 |
| Sunni Islam | 21,159 | 3.9 |
| Ahmadi Islam | 14,161 | 2.6 |
| Other forms of Islam | 39,733 | 7.3 |
| Kejawen Javanism | 4,460 | 0.8 |
| Judaism | 181 | 0.0 |
| Winti | 9,949 | 1.8 |
| Other faith | 4,630 | 0.9 |
| No faith | 40,718 | 7.5 |
| No answer | 17,082 | 3.2 |
| Total population | 541,638 | 100.0 |

=== 2010 data by Pew Research center ===
According to Pew research in 2010, Christians were the largest religious community, at slightly over half the population (51.6%), followed by Hindus (19.8%) and Muslims (15.2%); other religious minorities include adherents of various folk traditions (5.3%), Buddhists (<1%), Jews (<1%), practitioners of other faiths (1.8%), and unaffiliated (5.4%).

== Christianity ==
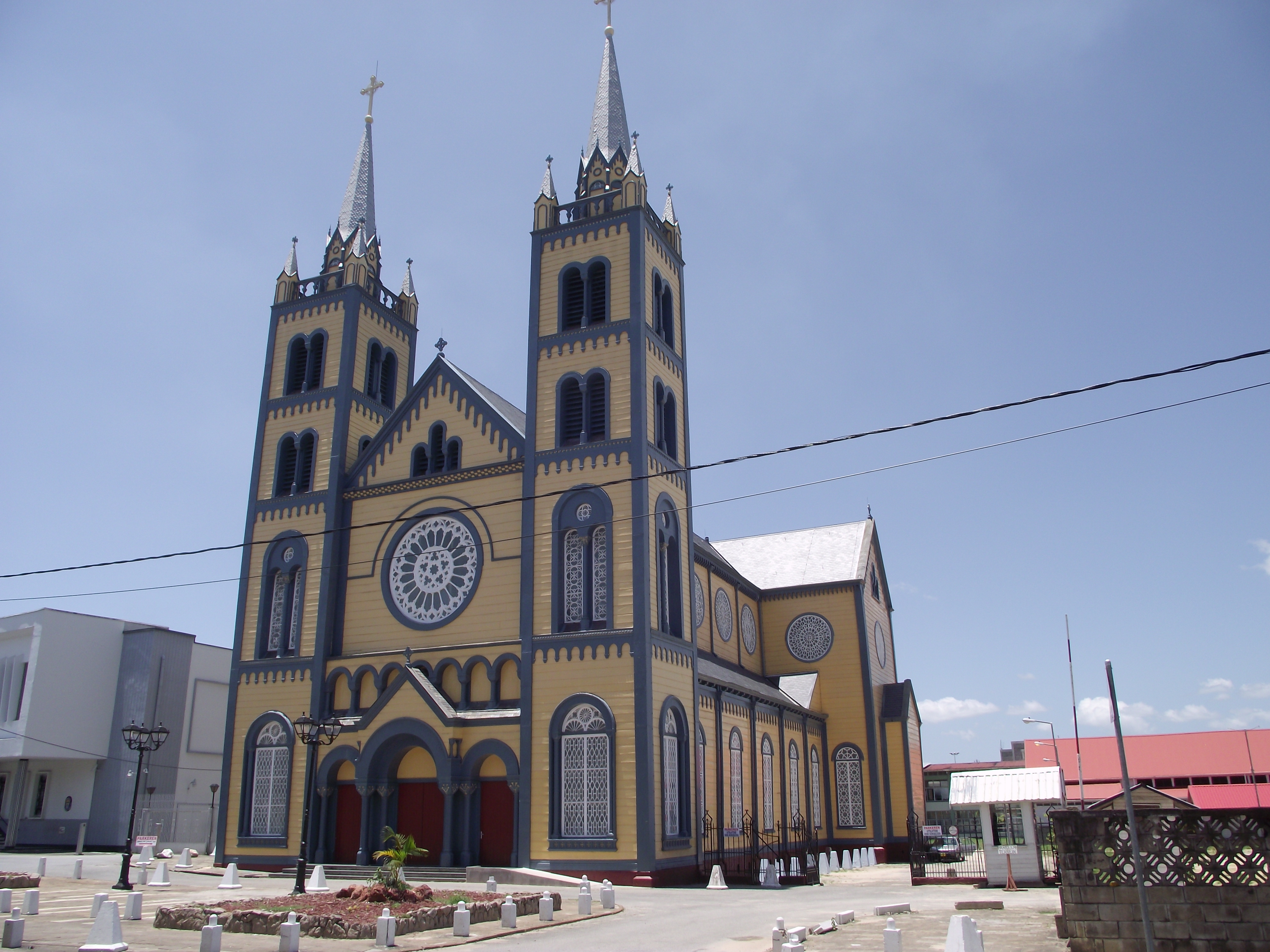
Cathedral of Saint Peter and Paul in Paramaribo.

The dominant religion in Suriname is Christianity, both in the form of Roman Catholicism and various denominations of Protestantism, the Anglican Church being the oldest. According to the 2012 census data 48.4% of the population of Suriname is Christian and the Pentecostal churches are the largest Protestant denomination, closely followed by Moravians.

== Hinduism ==
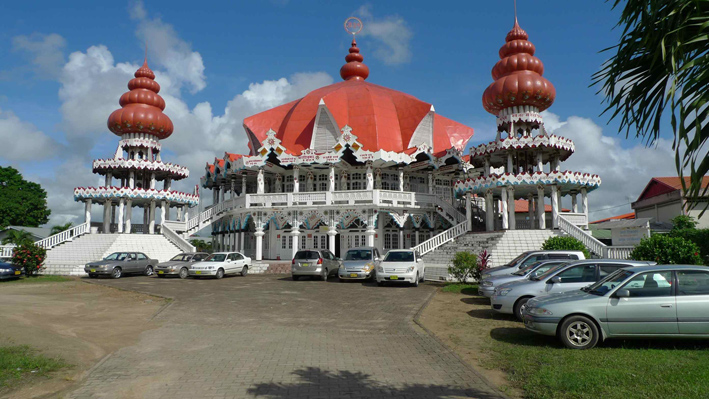
Arya Diwaker, an Arya Samaj Hindu Mandir in Paramaribo.

The story of Hinduism in Suriname is broadly parallel to that in Guyana. Indian indentured labourers were sent to colonial Dutch Guiana by special arrangement between the Dutch and British. The difference is that the Netherlands' more liberal policy toward Hinduism allowed the culture to develop stronger. Examples are the lack of a rigid caste system and the almost universal reading of Gita and Ramayan. According to the 2012 census of Suriname, Hindus constitute 22.3% of the population. Hindus are mostly concentrated in Northern coastal regions of Suriname: Nickerie, Wanica and Saramacca, where they constitute the largest religious group. There are several Hindu temples in Suriname.

== Islam ==
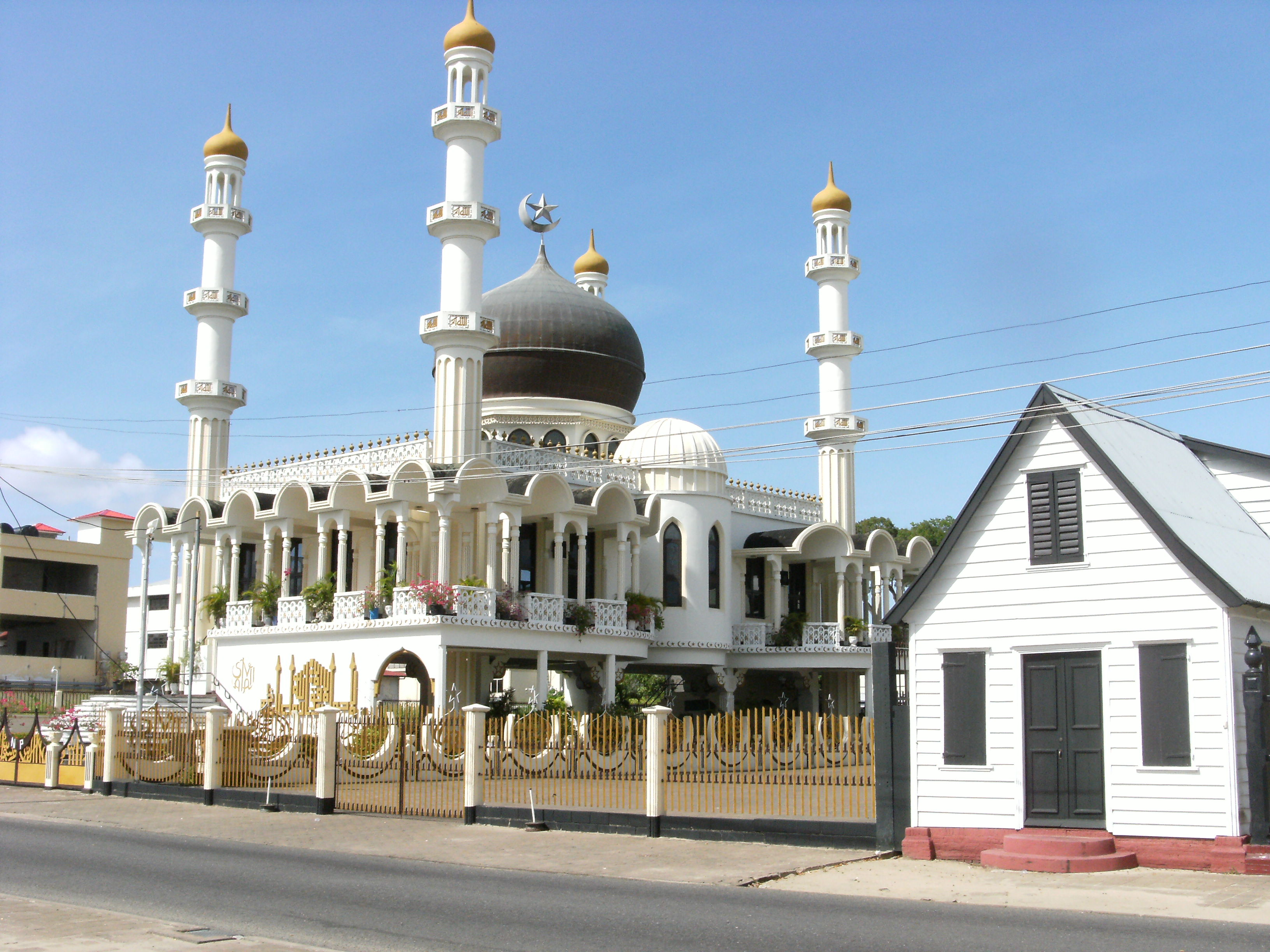
Mosque Keizerstraat in Paramaribo.

According to the most recent census, the Muslim population of Suriname represents about 13.9% of the country's total population, giving the country the highest proportion of Muslims in the Americas.

Muslims that first came to Suriname consisted of indentured laborers from South Asia and Indonesia, from whom today most Muslims in Suriname are descended.

== Javanism ==
Javanism of Kejawen denomination is followed by 0.8% of the Suriname population. It is followed mainly by the Javanese people in Suriname.

== Judaism ==
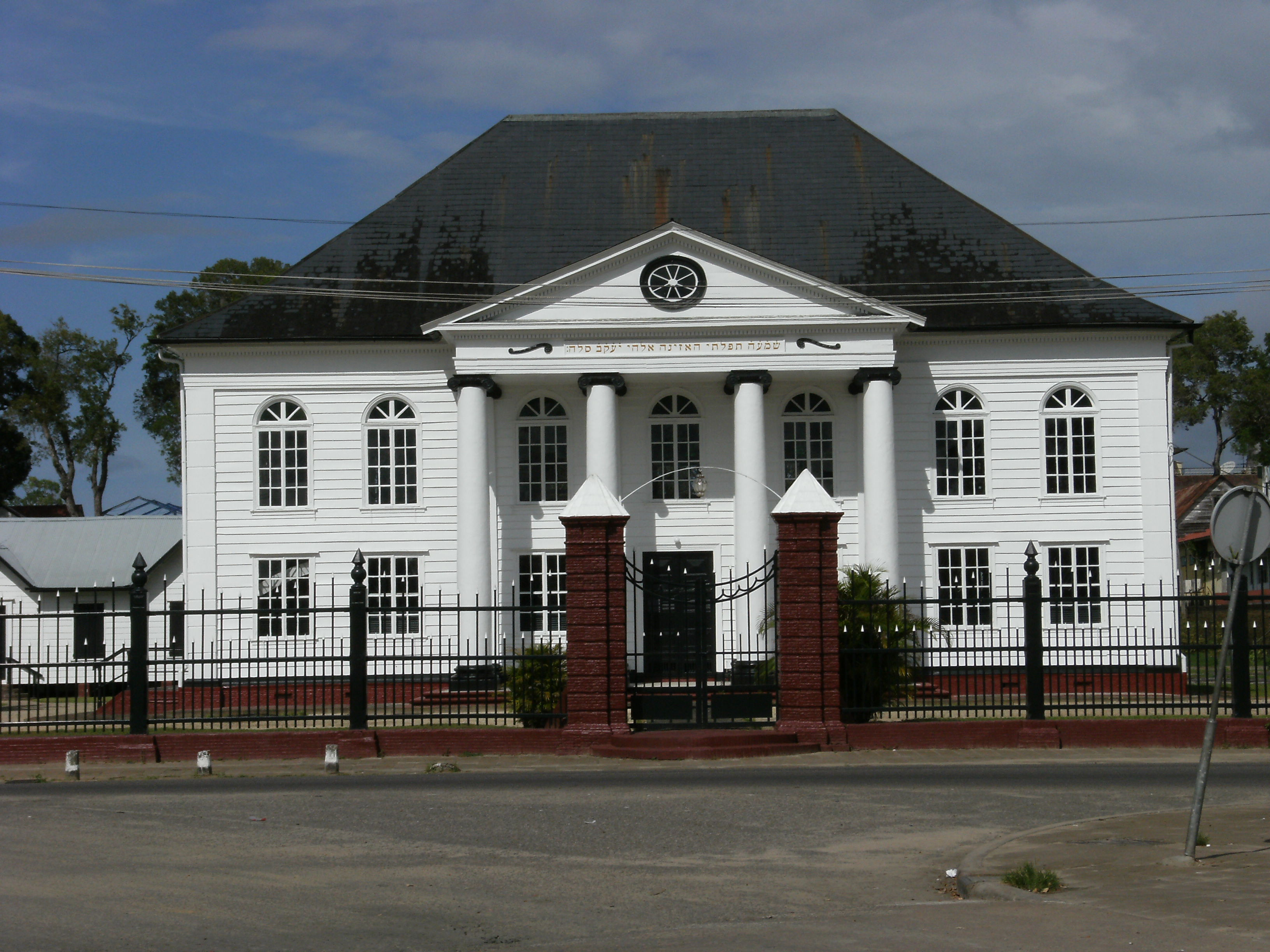
Neveh Shalom Synagogue in Paramaribo.

There has been a Jewish community in Suriname since 1639, when the English government allowed Sephardi Jews to settle the region. In the last few years, the Jewish community has been struggling due to dwindling funds and membership.

== Religious freedom ==
The constitution of Suriname establishes the freedom of religion and outlaws discrimination along religious lines. "Instigating religious hatred" is punishable by fines, and in some cases prison.

Religious groups may register with the government in order to receive financial support. Most groups are registered.

Religious instruction is not allowed in public schools. Private religious schools are allowed, and comprise roughly half of the primary and secondary schools in Suriname. Parents are not allowed to homeschool children for religious reasons.

The government engages in vocal support of religious diversity and tolerance through public statements, attendance at religious events, and hosting events in honor of various religious holidays. The armed forces have chaplains for the Hindu, Muslim, Catholic, and Protestant faiths.

In 2023, the country was scored 4 out of 4 for religious freedom.
