= Outline of religion =

Overview of and topical guide to religion

The following outline is provided as an overview of and topical guide to religion:

Religion – organized collection of beliefs, cultural systems, and world views that relate humanity to an order of existence. Many religions have narratives, symbols, and sacred histories that are intended to explain the meaning of life and/or to explain the origin of life or the Universe. From their beliefs about the cosmos and human nature, people derive morality, ethics, religious laws or a preferred lifestyle.

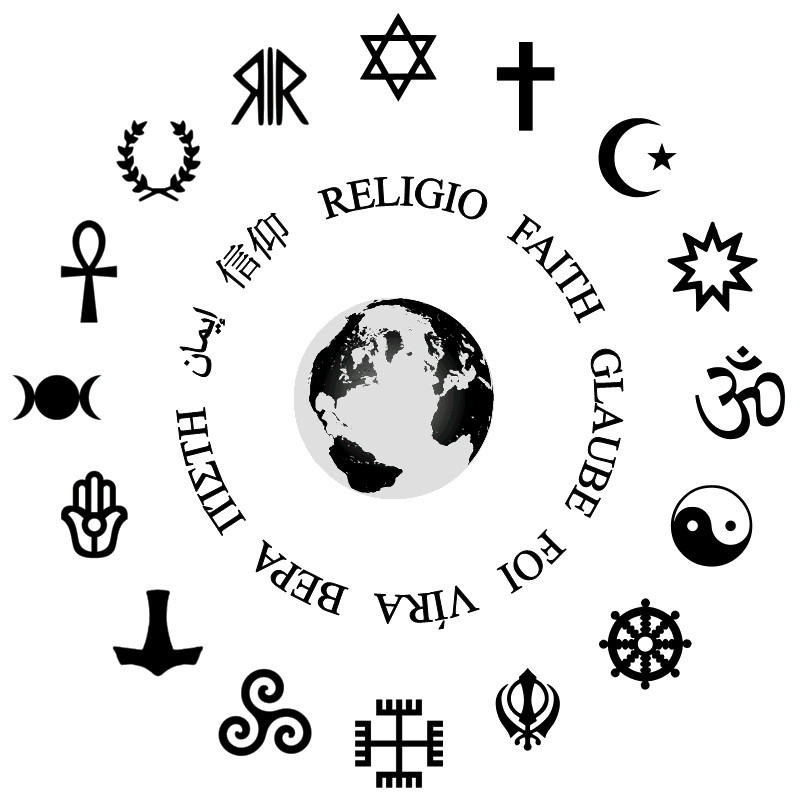
Religious symbols (clock-wise): Judaism, Christianity, Islam, Baháʼí Faith, Hinduism, Taoism, Buddhism, Sikhism, Slavic neopaganism, Celtic polytheism, Heathenism (German paganism), Semitic neopaganism, Wicca, Kemetism (Egyptian paganism), Hellenism, Italo-Roman neopaganism.

== Classification ==
- Religious demographics
  - List of religious populations
  - Trends in adherence
    - Growth of religion
      - Desecularization
    - Secularization

== Religion by region ==
Religion by continent

Africa • Antarctica • Asia • Europe • North America • Oceania (includes Australia) • South America

Religion by political division, arranged alphabetically

Religions by country

Religion by political division, arranged by continent or major geopolitical region

Religion in Africa

Religion in West Africa

Benin • Burkina Faso • Cape Verde • Côte d'Ivoire • Gambia • Ghana • Guinea • Guinea-Bissau • Liberia • Mali • Mauritania • Niger • Nigeria • Senegal • Sierra Leone • Togo

Religion in North Africa

Algeria • Egypt • Libya • Mauritania • Morocco • Sudan • South Sudan •Tunisia

Religion in Central Africa

Angola • Burundi • Cameroon • Central African Republic • Chad • The Democratic Republic of the Congo • Equatorial Guinea • Gabon • Republic of the Congo • Rwanda • São Tomé and Príncipe

Religion in East Africa

Burundi • Comoros • Djibouti • Eritrea • Ethiopia • Kenya • Madagascar • Malawi • Mauritius • Mozambique • Rwanda • Seychelles • Somalia (Somaliland) • Tanzania • Uganda • Zambia • Zimbabwe

Religion in Southern Africa

Botswana • Eswatini • Lesotho • Namibia • South Africa

Religion in Antarctica

Religion in Asia

Religion in Central Asia

Kazakhstan • Kyrgyzstan • Tajikistan • Turkmenistan • Uzbekistan

Religion in East Asia

China (including the territories of Tibet • Hong Kong • Macau) • Japan • North Korea • South Korea • Mongolia • Taiwan

Religion in North Asia

Russia

Religion in Southeast Asia

Brunei • Cambodia • East Timor (Timor-Leste) • Indonesia • Laos • Malaysia • Religion in Myanmar • Philippines • Singapore • Thailand • Vietnam

Religion in South Asia

Afghanistan • Bangladesh • Bhutan • Religion in India (Andhra Pradesh • Arunachal Pradesh • Assam • Bihar • Chhattisgarh • Goa • Gujarat • Haryana • Himachal Pradesh • Jammu and Kashmir • Jharkhand • Karnataka • Kerala • Madhya Pradesh • Maharashtra • Manipur • Meghalaya • Mizoram • Nagaland • Odisha • Punjab • Rajasthan • Sikkim • Tamil Nadu • Telangana • Tripura • Uttar Pradesh • Uttarakhand • West Bengal) • Maldives • Nepal • Pakistan • Sri Lanka

Religion in West Asia

Armenia • Azerbaijan • Bahrain • Cyprus (including disputed Northern Cyprus) • Georgia • Iran • Iraq • Israel • Jordan • Kuwait • Lebanon • Oman • Palestine • Qatar • Saudi Arabia • Syria • Turkey • United Arab Emirates • Yemen

Religion in the Caucasus (a region considered to be in both Asia and Europe, or between them)

Georgia (including disputed Abkhazia, South Ossetia) • Armenia • Azerbaijan (including disputed Nagorno-Karabakh Republic) • Parts of Russia

Religion in Europe

Åland • Albania • Andorra • Armenia • Austria • Azerbaijan • Belarus • Belgium • Bosnia and Herzegovina • Bulgaria • Croatia • Cyprus • Czech Republic • Denmark • Estonia • Faroe Islands • Finland • France • Georgia • Germany • Gibraltar • Greece • Guernsey • Hungary • Iceland • Ireland • Isle of Man • Italy • Jersey • Kazakhstan • Kosovo • Latvia • Liechtenstein • Lithuania • Luxembourg • Malta • Moldova (including disputed Transnistria) • Monaco • Montenegro • Netherlands • North Macedonia • Norway • Poland • Portugal • Romania • Russia • San Marino • Serbia • Slovakia • Slovenia • Spain (including Catalonia) • Sweden • Switzerland • Turkey • Ukraine • United Kingdom (England • Northern Ireland • Scotland • Wales) • Vatican City

Religion in the European Union

North America

Northern America

Canada (Alberta • British Columbia • Manitoba • New Brunswick • Nunavut • Ontario • Prince Edward Island • Quebec • Saskatchewan) • Greenland • Saint Pierre and Miquelon • United States (Alabama • Alaska • Arizona • Arkansas • California • Colorado • Connecticut • Delaware • Florida • Georgia • Hawaii • Idaho • Illinois • Indiana • Iowa • Kansas • Kentucky • Louisiana • Maine • Maryland • Massachusetts • Michigan • Minnesota • Mississippi • Missouri • Montana • Nebraska • Nevada • New Hampshire • New Jersey • New Mexico • New York • North Carolina • North Dakota • Ohio • Oklahoma • Oregon • Pennsylvania • Rhode Island • South Carolina • South Dakota • Tennessee • Texas • Utah • Vermont • Virginia • Washington • Religion in Washington, D.C. • West Virginia • Wisconsin • Wyoming)

Religion in Central America

Belize • Costa Rica • El Salvador • Guatemala • Honduras • Nicaragua • Mexico • Panama

Religion in the Caribbean

Anguilla • Antigua and Barbuda • Aruba • Bahamas • Barbados • Bermuda • British Virgin Islands • Cayman Islands • Cuba • Dominica • Dominican Republic • Grenada • Haiti • Jamaica • Montserrat • Netherlands Antilles • Puerto Rico • Saint Barthélemy • Saint Kitts and Nevis • Saint Lucia • Saint Martin • Saint Vincent and the Grenadines • Trinidad and Tobago • Turks and Caicos Islands • United States Virgin Islands

Religion in Oceania

Religion in Australasia

Australia (Christmas Island Norfolk Island) • New Zealand

Religion in Melanesia

Fiji • Indonesia (Oceanian part only) • New Caledonia (France) • Papua New Guinea • Solomon Islands • Vanuatu •

Religion in Micronesia

Federated States of Micronesia • Guam (USA) • Kiribati • Marshall Islands • Nauru • Northern Mariana Islands (USA) • Palau • Wake Island (USA) •

Religion in Polynesia

American Samoa (USA) • Chatham Islands (NZ) • Cook Islands (NZ) • Easter Island (Chile) • French Polynesia (France) • Hawaii (USA) • Loyalty Islands (France) • Niue (NZ) • Pitcairn Islands (UK) • Adamstown • Samoa • Tokelau (NZ) • Tonga • Tuvalu • Wallis and Futuna (France)

Religion in South America

Argentina • Bolivia • Brazil • Chile • Colombia • Ecuador • Falkland Islands • Guyana • Paraguay • Peru • Suriname • Uruguay • Venezuela

== Religious studies ==
- Anthropology of religion
- Cognitive science of religion
- Comparative religion
- Evolutionary origin of religions
- Evolutionary psychology of religion
- History of religion
- Nonviolence
- Philosophy of religion
- Psychology of religion
- Sociology of religion

== Religious concepts ==
=== Religious belief ===
- Afterlife
- Acosmism
- Animism
- Deity
  - List of deities
  - Theism
    - Deism
    - Henotheism
    - Monotheism
    - Pandeism
    - Panentheism
    - Pantheism
    - Polytheism
    - Post-theism
- Divination
- Doctrine
- Eschatology
- Faith
- Magic and religion
- Memes in religion
- Mysticism
- Mythology
- Reincarnation
- Religious cosmology
  - Creation myth
- Religious naturalism
- Religious philosophy
  - Dualism in cosmology
  - Free will in religion
  - Monism
  - Nondualism
  - Religious ethics
- Sacred
  - Sacred space
- Shamanism
- Soul
- Spirituality
  - List of spirituality-related topics
- Supernatural
- Prophecy
  - Prophet

=== Religious practice ===
- Asceticism
- Clergy
  - Monasticism
  - Ordination
- Meditation
- Nonviolence
- Pilgrimage
- Prayer
  - Call to prayer
- Religious behaviour
- Religious conversion
  - Assimilation
  - Missionary
  - Proselytism
- Religious denomination
- Religious experience
- Religious education
  - Religious school
- Ritual
  - Liturgy
  - Ritual purification
  - Sacrifice
- Worship
  - Place of worship

== Religion in society ==
- Approaches to the beliefs of others
  - Exclusivism
    - Chosen people
    - Fundamentalism
  - Inclusivism
    - Religious pluralism
- Disability and religion
- Freedom of religion
  - Toleration
- Gender and religion
  - Women and religion
- Religion and LGBTQ people
  - Homosexuality and religion
  - Intersex people and religion
  - Transgender people and religion
- Minority religion
- Religion in politics
  - State religion
  - Theocracy
- Relationship between religion and science
- Religion and sexuality
- Religious fanaticism
- Religious violence
  - Religious persecution
  - Religious terrorism
  - Religious war
- Vegetarianism and religion
- Wealth and religion
  - Religion and agriculture
  - Religion and business

== Religion-specific topics ==
=== African traditional and diasporic topics ===
==== Rasta topics ====
- Mansions of Rastafari

=== Anitism topics ===
- Anito
- Philippine shamans
- Bathala
- Dambana

=== East Asian topics ===
==== Shintō topics ====
- Shinto sects and schools

==== Taoism topics ====
- Tao
- History of Taoism
- Taoist diet
- Taoist schools
- Taoist meditation
- Taoist scripture

=== Indian topics ===
- Ahimsa
- Karma
- Saṃsāra

==== Buddhism topics ====
- Buddhahood
  - Arahant
  - Bodhisattva
  - Buddha
- Basic concepts
  - Four Noble Truths
  - Five Aggregates
  - Three marks of existence
  - Dependent Origination
  - Karma
  - Rebirth
  - Saṃsāra
  - Nirvana
  - Noble Eightfold Path
- Branches of Buddhism
  - Theravada
  - Mahayana
  - Vajrayana
- Buddhism by country
- Buddhist monasticism
  - Monk
  - Nun
- Buddhist philosophy
- Buddhist texts
  - Mahayana sutras
  - Pāli Canon
- Cultural elements of Buddhism
- Glossary of Buddhism
- History of Buddhism
- Index of Buddhism-related articles
- List of Buddhists
- Practice
  - Meditation
  - Buddhist vegetarianism
  - Morality
  - Wisdom
- Three Jewels
  - Buddha (the Teacher)
  - Dhamma (the Teaching)
  - Sangha (the Community)

==== Hinduism topics ====
- Diet in Hinduism
- Hindu denominations
  - Ayyavazhi
    - Ayyavazhi scriptures
- History of Hinduism
- List of Hinduism-related articles

==== Jainism topics ====
- History of Jainism

==== Sikhism topics ====
- Diet in Sikhism
- History of Sikhism
- Sikh gurus
- Sikh scriptures
  - Bani – Gurbani
  - Chaupai
  - Dasam Granth
  - Guru Granth Sahib
  - Jaap Sahib
  - Japji Sahib
  - Mul Mantra
  - Sukhmani Sahib

=== Middle Eastern topics ===
- Abrahamic religions
- Angel
  - Demon
    - Demonology
    - Devil
    - List of demons in religion and myth

==== Bábism topics ====
- The Báb

==== Baháʼí Faith topics ====
- ʻAbdu'l-Bahá
- Baháʼí teachings
- Baháʼu'lláh
- History of the Baháʼí Faith

==== Christianity topics ====
- Christianity by country
- God in Christianity
  - God the Father
  - Jesus
  - Holy Spirit
- History of Christianity
- List of Christian denominations
  - Catholicism
    - List of popes
    - Catholic Church by country
  - Eastern Orthodoxy
  - Oriental Christianity
  - Protestantism
    - Protestantism by country
  - Restorationism
    - List of Latter Day Saint movement topics
  - Unitarian Universalism
- List of saints
- Religious texts
  - Bible
    - Antilegomena
    - Deuterocanonical books
    - Gospels
    - Epistles
    - New Testament
    - Old Testament
- Timeline of Christian missions

==== Islam topics ====
- Glossary of Islam
- God in Islam
  - Names of God in Islam
- Hajj
- History of Islam
- Index of Islamic and Muslim related articles
- Islam by country
- Islamic schools and branches
  - Ahmadiyya
  - Sunni
  - Shia
  - Sufi
- Islamic scripture
  - Hadith
    - Hadith collections
      - Nahj al-Balagha
      - Sahih Bukhari
    - Hadith Qudsi
    - Isnad – Ilm ar-rijal – Narrators of hadith
    - Matn
  - Quran – Sura – Ayat
    - Asbab al-nuzul
    - Naskh
    - Quranic literalism
    - Tafsir Qudsi – tafsir
- Prophets and messengers in Islam
  - Muhammad
- Salat
- Zakat
- Animals in Islam

==== Judaism topics ====
- Halakha
  - Kosher
- God in Judaism
  - Names of God in Judaism
- Jewish religious movements
- Jewish scripture
- Judaism by country
- Origins of Judaism
  - Israel

==== Mandaeism topics ====
- Mandaeans
- Mandaean priest
  - List of Mandaean priests
- Mandaean cosmology
- Mandaean calendar
- List of Mandaic manuscripts

==== Zoroastrianism topics ====
- Avesta
- Zoroaster

=== New religious movement topics ===
- List of new religious movements
- List of New Age topics
- Open source religion

==== Modern Paganism topics ====
- Asatru
- Kemetism
- List of Modern pagan movements
- Neoshamanism
- Wicca
- Witchcraft

==== Spiritism topics ====
- History of Spiritism

==== Tenrikyo topics ====
- Joyous Life
- Ofudesaki
- Osashizu
- Oyasama
- Tenri-O-no-Mikoto

== Irreligion topics ==
- Apostasy
  - Disaffiliation
- Anarchism and religion
- Antireligion
- Freethought
- Ignosticism
- Metaphysical realism
- Metaphysical naturalism
- Nontheism
  - Agnosticism
  - Antitheism
  - Atheism
- Religious skepticism
- Secular humanism
