= Protestantism by country =

Distribution of Protestants

Percentage of Protestants by country

Number of Protestants by country

The World Christian Database estimated a total of 637,856,000 Protestants and 426,370,000 Independents (mostly non-denominational Pentecostals who do not self-identify as Protestants), in early 2026. Earlier estimates of Protestants worldwide are between 800 and 900 million, (Note: Most current estimates place the world's Protestant population in the range of 800 million to more than 1 billion. For example, author Hans Hillerbrand estimated a total Protestant population of 833,457,000 in 2004, while the World Christian Database estimated a total of 637,856,000 Protestants and 426,370,000 Independents (mostly non-denominational Pentecostals who do not self-identify as Protestants), in early 2026.) among approximately 2.3 billion Christians. (Note: Current sources are in general agreement that Christians make up about 33% of the world's population—slightly over 2.4 billion adherents in mid-2015.) In 2010, a total of more than 800 million included 300 million in Sub-Saharan Africa, 260 million in the Americas, 140 million in Asia-Pacific region, 100 million in Europe and 2 million in Middle East-North Africa. Protestants account for nearly 35% of Christians worldwide and more than one tenth of the total human population. Various estimates put the percentage of Protestants in relation to the total number of the world's Christians at 33%, 36%, 36.7%, and 40%, while in relation to the world's population at 11.6% and 13%.

Within Europe, Protestantism remains the most practiced religion in the Nordic countries and United Kingdom. In other historical Protestant strongholds such as Germany, the Netherlands, Switzerland, Latvia, Estonia and Hungary, it remains one of the practiced religions. Although Czech Republic was the site of one of the most significant pre-reformation movements, there are only few Protestant adherents—mainly due to historical reasons like persecution of Protestants by the Catholic Habsburgs, restrictions during the Communist rule and also the ongoing secularization. Over the last several decades, Protestant practice has been declining as secularization has increased. According to a 2019 study about religiosity in the European Union (EU) by Eurobarometer, Protestants made up only 9% of the EU population. According to Pew Research Center, Protestants constituted nearly one fifth (or 17.8%) of the continent's Christian population in 2010. Clarke and Beyer estimate that Protestants constituted 15% of all Europeans in 2009, while Noll claims that less than 12% of them lived in Europe in 2010.

Changes in worldwide Protestantism over the last century have been significant. Since 1900, Protestantism has spread rapidly in Africa, Asia and South America. That caused Protestantism to be called a primarily non-Western religion. Much of the growth has occurred after World War II, when decolonization of Africa and abolition of various restrictions against Protestants in Latin American countries occurred. According to one source, Protestants constituted respectively 2.5% of South Americans, 2% of Africans and 0.5% of Asians in 1900. In 2000, these percentages had increased to 17%, more than 27% and 5.5%, respectively. According to Mark A. Noll, 79% of Anglicans lived in the United Kingdom in 1910, while most of the remainder were found in the United States and across the British Commonwealth. By 2010, 59% of Anglicans were found in Africa. China is home to the world's largest Protestant minority. (Note: Estimates for China vary in dozens of millions. Nevertheless, in comparison to the other countries, there is no disagreement that China has the most numerous Protestant minority.)

Protestantism is growing in Africa, Asia, Latin America while declining in North America and Europe. In France, Protestantism was eradicated after the abolition of the Edict of Nantes by the Edict of Fontainebleau and the following persecution of Huguenots. However, "by 2050 it is expected that less than 9% of Protestants will be European" and "sometime around 2040 half of all Protestants will likely live in Africa." The United States is home to approximately 20% of Protestants. According to a 2019 study, Protestant share of U.S. population dropped to 43%, ending its historical status as religion of the majority. The decline is attributed mainly to the dropping membership of the Mainline Protestant churches while Evangelical Protestant and Black churches are relatively stable.

In 2010, the largest Protestant denominational families were historically Pentecostal denominations (10.8%), Anglican (10.6%), Lutheran (9.7%), Baptist (9%), United and uniting churches (unions of different denominations) (7.2%), Presbyterian or Reformed (7%), Methodist (3.4%), Adventist (2.7%), Congregationalist (0.5%), Brethren (0.5%), The Salvation Army (0.3%) and Moravian (0.1%). Other denominations accounted for 38.2% of Protestants.

By 2050, some project Protestantism to rise to slightly more than half of the world's total Christian population. (Note: Protestant, Independent and Anglican parties are understood as Protestant as stated previously in the article, as well as in the book: Statistics for the P, I and A megablocs are often combined because they overlap so much-hence the order followed here.) In 2004, Hans J. Hillerbrand asserted that "wider Protestant" and Catholic share of the global Christian population will almost be the same by 2050, with "wider Protestants" exhibiting a significantly higher growth rate.

== Methodology ==
For the purposes of this list, the following Christian branches are considered Protestant:

- Seventh-day Adventists
- Anabaptists (including Amish, Hutterites, Mennonites)
- Anglicans (including Episcopalians)
- Baptists
- Calvinists (or the Reformed tradition) (including Congregationalists, Presbyterians, Continental Reformed, Waldensians)
- Lutherans
- Methodists
- Pentecostals
- Other Protestants (including Hussites, Brethren, Free Evangelicals, Quakers, United, Holiness and others)

Evangelicals, Charismatics, Neo-charismatics and other revivalists are found virtually across every Protestant branch. Nondenominationals, various independents and Protestants from other denominations, not easily fitting in the traditional classification, are also taken into account.

Estimates of total Protestant population vary considerably. Most reliable sources claim a range of 800 million to more than 1 billion. Difficulties occur as there is no consensus among scholars which denominations should be considered Protestant.

== Countries ==
According to some, Russia is another country to see Protestant growth.

The seven regions considered in the following table are the six traditional ones (Europe, Asia, Africa, North America, South America, Oceania), plus Middle East (i.e., countries with Islamic majority from the Mediterranean to Iran).

Protestants by country
Region	Country	Total population (year)	% Protestant	Protestant total
Asia	Afghanistan (details)	29,928,987	0.03%	10,000
Europe	Albania (details)	3,563,112	0.23%	8,191
Africa	Algeria (details)	35,531,853	1.62%	250,000
Europe	Andorra (details)	71,201	2.1%	1,495
Africa	Angola (details)	19,600,000	30.6%	5,997,600
North America	Antigua and Barbuda (details)	68,722	68%	59,101
South America	Argentina (details)	40,500,000	15.3%	6,874,290
Europe	Armenia (details)	2,982,904	3.7%	110,368
Oceania	Australia (details)	23,401,892 (2016)	23.1%	6,355,952
Europe	Austria (details)	8,823,053 (2017)	3.4%	297,578
Europe	Azerbaijan (details)	8,581,400	0.07%	6,007
North America	Bahamas (details)	353,658	70%	247,561
Asia	Bahrain (details)	688,345	?	?
Asia	Bangladesh (details)	144,319,628	0.23%	331,935
North America	Barbados (details)	278,289	67%	186,454
Europe	Belarus (details)	10,300,483	5%	515,024
Europe	Belgium (details)	10,364,388	1.35%	140,000
North America	Belize (details)	279,457	30%	83,837
Africa	Benin (details)	9,100,000	23%	2,093,000
Asia	Bhutan (details)	791,524	0.05%	400
South America	Bolivia (details)	8,857,870	16%-17.2%-20%	1,417,259
Europe	Bosnia and Herzegovina (details)	4,025,476	0.04%	1,610
Africa	Botswana (details)	2,000,000	66%	1,320,000
South America	Brazil (details)	203,080,756	26.9%	47,418,024
Asia	Brunei (details)	372,361	1.3%	4,841
Europe	Bulgaria (details)	6,445,481	1.1%	69,852
Africa	Burkina Faso (details)	17,000,000	9%	1,360,000
Africa	Burundi (details)	10,200,000	20%	2,400,000
Asia	Cambodia (details)	13,607,069	0.04%	5,390
Africa	Cameroon (details)	16,380,005	20%	3,276,001
North America	Canada (details)	36,242,571	21.7%	7,869,955
Africa	Cape Verde (details)	415,294	3.5%	14,535
Africa	Central African Republic (details)	5,000,000	61%	3,050,000
Africa	Chad (details)	11,500,000	18%	2,070,000
South America	Chile (details)	18,192,000	16.3%	2,466,607
Asia	China (details)	1,382,710,000 (2016)	2.9%	39,970,000
South America	Colombia (details)	46,900,000 (2011 est)	16.4% (2020)	5,862,500
Africa	Comoros (details)	671,247	0.25%	1,678
Africa	Congo, Republic of the (details)	4,100,000	51%	2,091,000
Africa	Congo, Democratic Republic of the (details)	65,966,000 (2010)	50%	31,663,680
North America	Costa Rica (details)	4,700,000 (2011 est)	12.3%-25%	1,250,000
Europe	Croatia (details)	4,495,904	2%	89,918
North America	Cuba (details)	11,346,670	11%	1,248,133
Europe	Cyprus (details)	780,133	2%	15,603
Europe	Czech Republic (details)	10,241,138	1.1%	
Europe	Denmark (details)	5,700,000	77% - 82%	4,389,000 - 4,674,000
Africa	Djibouti (details)	900,000	0.2%	1,800
North America	Dominica (details)	69,278	15%	10,392
North America	Dominican Republic (details)	10,000,000 (2011 est)	18% (poll)	1,800,000
South America	Ecuador (details)	14,700,000	12.5%-14%	1,837,500
Africa	Egypt	105,000,000	2%	2,100,000
North America	El Salvador (details)	6,200,000	34.4% / 28%	2,132,800
Africa	Equatorial Guinea (details)	700,000	6%	42,000
Africa	Eritrea (details)	5,900,000	5%	295,000
Europe	Estonia (details)	1,114,030	9.2%	101,940
Africa	Eswatini (details)	1,200,000	67%	801,000
Africa	Ethiopia (details)	120,750,932 (2020)	32.6%	45,717,673
Oceania	Fiji (details)	893,354	42.5%	379,676
Europe	Finland (details)	5,636,000	62.9%	3,546,000
Europe	France (details)	60,656,178	2%	1,213,124
Africa	Gabon (details)	1,500,000	39.7%	
Africa	Gambia (details)	1,593,256	7%	360,000
Europe	Georgia (details)	4,677,401	2.14%	100,000
Europe	Germany (details)	83,155,000 (2020)	22.6%	18,600,000
Africa	Ghana (details)	24,200,000 (2010)	58.1%	14,060,200
Europe	Greece (details)	10,668,354	0.28%	30,000
North America	Grenada (details)	89,502	30%	26,851
North America	Guatemala (details)	14,700,000	38.2%	6,038,150
Africa	Guinea (details)	10,200,000	4%	408,000
Africa	Guinea-Bissau (details)	1,600,000	2%	32,000
South America	Guyana (details)	765,283	38%	290,808
North America	Haiti (details)	10,100,000 (2011 est)	30%	3,030,000
North America	Honduras (details)	6,975,204	41%	2,859,834
Europe	Hungary (details)	10,006,835	14%	1,401,640
Europe	Iceland (details)	389,400 (2025)	64.1%	249,600
Asia	India (details)	1,407,563,842 (2021)	1.5%	18,860,000
Asia	Indonesia (details)	270,000,000 (2020)	7.6%	20,246,000
Asia	Iran (details)	68,017,860	0.3%	204,054
Asia	Iraq (details)	38,146,025	0.1%	40,000
Europe	Ireland (details)	4,761,900 (2016)	4.2%	201,400
Asia	Israel (details)	9,076,883	0.71%	64,000
Europe	Italy (details)	58,102,112	1,3%	755,328
Africa	Ivory Coast (details)	22,500,000	23%	5,175,000
North America	Jamaica (details)	2,731,832	60%	1,639,099
Asia	Japan (details)	127,417,244	0.4%	509,668
Asia	Jordan (details)	5,759,732	0.5%	28,799
Asia	Kazakhstan (details)	15,185,844	2%	303,717
Africa	Kenya (details)	50,953,000 (2019)	60.8%	31,081,162
Oceania	Kiribati (details)	103,500	40%	41,400
Asia	Kuwait (details)	2,335,648	2.14%	50,000
Asia	Kyrgyzstan (details)	5,146,281	0.03%	1,337
Asia	Laos (details)	6,217,141	0.56%	35,000
Europe	Latvia (details)	2,070,371	35%	714,000
Asia	Lebanon (details)	3,826,018	1%	40,000
Africa	Lesotho (details)	2,200,000	50%	1,100,000
Africa	Liberia (details)	4,100,000	75%	3,075,000
Africa	Libya (details)	6,765,563	Less than 1%	?
Europe	Liechtenstein (details)	33,436	7%	2,341
Europe	Lithuania (details)	3,596,617	1%	35,966
Europe	Luxembourg (details)	468,571	1%	4,686
Africa	Madagascar (details)	21,300,000	38%	8,094,000
Africa	Malawi (details)	15,900,000	55%	8,745,000
Asia	Malaysia (details)	28,900,000	4%	1,156,000
Asia	Maldives (details)	349,106	0	0
Africa	Mali (details)	15,400,000	1%	154,000
Oceania	Marshall Islands (details)	62,000	76.7%	47,554
Africa	Mauritania (details)	3,500,000	0.1%	3,500
Africa	Mauritius (details)	1,230,602	4.5%	55,377
North America	Mexico (details)	114,800,000 (2011 est)	5%-7.3%-10%	5,700,000-11,400,000
Europe	Moldova (details)	4,455,421	0.26%	11,634
Oceania	Micronesia (details)	108,155	47%	50,833
Asia	Mongolia (details)	3,348,272	1.25%	41,800
Africa	Morocco (details)	32,725,847	Protestant minorities	?
Africa	Mozambique (details)	23,100,000	27%	6,237,000
Asia	Myanmar (details)	42,909,464	3%	1,287,284
Africa	Namibia (details)	2,300,000	74%	1,702,000
Oceania	Nauru (details)	13,048	66%	8,612
Asia	Nepal (details)	27,676,547	0.01	3,979
Europe	Netherlands (details)	16,407,491	11%	3,445,573
Oceania	New Zealand (details)	4,699,755	26.7%	1,253,742
North America	Nicaragua (details)	5,900,000 (2011 est)	26.5% (PF)	1,563,500
Africa	Niger (details)	16,100,000	0.5%	80,500
Africa	Nigeria (details)	242,000,000	35.3 % - 37.7%	80,000,000-85,000,000
Asia	North Korea (details)	22,912,177	0.04%	10,000
Europe	North Macedonia (details)	2,045,262	3%	61,358
Europe	Norway (details)	5,367,000	72.0%	3,865,000
Asia	Oman (details)	3,001,583	5.8%[98]	11,500
Asia	Pakistan (details)	162,419,946	0.86%	1,400,000
Oceania	Palau (details)	20,000	29.6%	5,960
North America	Panama (details)	3,600,000	24%	864,000
Oceania	Papua New Guinea (details)	5,545,268	61.5%	3,410,340
South America	Paraguay (details)	6,600,000	6%	396,000
South America	Peru (details)	32,510,000 (2019)	12.5% (2006 census)	3,675,000
Asia	Philippines (details)	100,000,000	10.0%-8.2%	10,000,000
Europe	Poland (details)	38,635,144	0.35%	130,000
Europe	Portugal (details)	10,421,117	2.2%	229,265
North America	Puerto Rico (details)	3,500,000	33%	1,100,000
Asia	Qatar (details)	863,051	1%	Unknown
Europe	Romania (details)	22,329,977	6%	1,339,799
Europe	Russia (details)	143,420,309	2%	2,485,000
Africa	Rwanda (details)	10,900,000	43%	4,687,000
North America	Saint Kitts and Nevis (details)	38,958	74%	29,335
North America	Saint Lucia (details)	166,312	10%	16,631
North America	Saint Vincent and the Grenadines (details)	117,534	77%	90,501
Oceania	Samoa (details)	179,000	49.8%	89,142
Asia	Saudi Arabia (details)	26,417,599	3.33%	800,000
Africa	Senegal (details)	11,126,832	0.5%	55,634
Europe	Serbia (details)	7,186,175	1.2%	80,291
Africa	Seychelles (details)	81,188	8%	6,495
Africa	Sierra Leone (details)	5,400,000	14%	756,000
Asia	Singapore (details)	4,425,720	8%	354,058
Europe	Slovakia (details)	5,431,363	8.9	935,235
Europe	Slovenia (details)	2,011,070	0.8%	16,135
Oceania	Solomon Islands (details)	540,000	76.6%	410,000
Africa	Somalia (details)	9,900,000	0	0
Africa	South Africa (details)	50,500,000 (2010)	72.9%	36,814,500
Asia	South Korea (details)	51,815,810	19.70%	10,207,715
Africa	South Sudan (details)	9,950,000	20.7%	2,060,000
Europe	Spain (details)	50,000,000	3%	1,500,000
Asia	Sri Lanka (details)	20,064,776	0.8%	160,518
Africa	Sudan (details)	44,600,000	5%	2,200,000
South America	Suriname (details)	500,000	25%	125,000
Europe	Sweden (details)	10,000,000	60%	6,000,000
Europe	Switzerland (details)	8,482,152 (2017)	27%	2,290,000
Asia	Syria (details)	18,448,752	0.2%	37,605
Asia	Taiwan (details)	22,894,384	2.6%	595,254
Asia	Tajikistan (details)	7,163,506	0.01%	711
Africa	Tanzania (details)	62,092,761	38%	22,765,045
Asia	Thailand (details)	64,076,033	0.77%	492,800
Asia	Timor-Leste (details)	1,040,880	1.2%-1.96%	31,226
Africa	Togo (details)	5,681,519	9.5%	539,744
Oceania	Tonga (details)	112,422	73%	82,068
North America	Trinidad and Tobago (details)	1,300,000	38%	494,000
Africa	Tunisia (details)	10,074,951	3.33%	335,496
Europe	Turkey (details)	84,680,273	Less than 1%	13,000
Asia	Turkmenistan (details)	4,952,081	0.6%	81
Oceania	Tuvalu (details)	11,636	94%	11,450
Africa	Uganda (details)	34,856,000 (2014)	45.1%	15,720,056
Europe	Ukraine (details)	47,425,336	2.3%	900,000
Asia	United Arab Emirates (details)	2,563,212	5%	128,160
Europe	United Kingdom (details)	67,330,000 (2021)	31%	20,770,000
North America	United States (details)	341,000,000	46.5% 36% 43% 40%	158,565,000; 122,760,000; 146,630,000; 136,400,000
South America	Uruguay (details)	3,400,000	15%	510,000
Asia	Uzbekistan (details)	26,851,195	0.01%	1,345
Oceania	Vanuatu (details)	243,304	40%	97,321
Europe	Vatican City (details)	921	0%	0
South America	Venezuela (details)	33,221,865	17%	5,647,717
Asia	Vietnam (details)	83,535,576	1%	835,355
Asia	Yemen (details)	20,727,063	Approximately 1%	?
Africa	Zambia (details)	13,500,000	68%	9,180,000
Africa	Zimbabwe (details)	12,100,000	67%	8,107,000
World		7,600,000,000 (2017)	12.1%	920,000,000

== By region ==
The following are summary tables of the numbers and percentages of Protestants in each region. Also included are the percentages of Protestants in the world that reside in that region ("% of Protestant total").

Protestants in Africa
Region	Total Population	Protestants	% Protestant	% of Protestant total
Central Africa	91,561,875	18,322,151	20.01%	3.09%
East Africa	225,488,566	36,965,728	16.39%	6.23%
North Africa	161,963,837	100,300	0.06%	0.01%
Southern Africa	137,092,019	55,432,677	40.44%	9.35%
West Africa	269,935,590	49,230,627	18.24%	8.30%
Total	886,041,887	160,051,482	18.06%	26.99%

Protestants in Asia
Region	Total Population	Protestants	% Protestant	% of Protestant total
Central Asia	92,019,166	308,736	0.34%	0.05%
East Asia	1,527,960,261	25,550,708	1.67%	4.31%
Middle East	271,013,623	680,757	0.25%	0.11%
South Asia	1,437,326,682	9,458,283	0.66%	1.59%
Southeast Asia	571,337,070	26,387,155	4.62%	4.45%
Total	3,899,656,802	62,385,639	1.6%	10.52%

Protestants in Europe
Region	Total Population	Protestants	% Protestant	% of Protestant total
Central Europe	82,033,047	7,803,177	9.51%	1.32%
Eastern Europe	209,198,166	1,389,452	0.66%	0.23%
Northern Europe	191,466,473	104,997,796	54.8%	17.71%
Balkans	65,407,609	1,713,080	2.62%	0.31%
Southern Europe	180,498,923	1,964,538	1.09%	0.33%
Total	728,604,218	117,868,043	16.2%	19.90%

Protestants in the Americas
Region	Total Population	Protestants	% Protestant	% of Protestant total
Caribbean	37,285,819	5,912,490	15.86%	0.99%
Central America	147,338,108	16,376,631	11.12%	2.76%
North America	328,539,175	172,167,236	52.4%	29.03%
South America	371,075,531	44,682,767	12.04%	7.53%
Total	884,238,633	239,139,124	27.05%	40.32%

Protestants in Oceania
Region	Total Population	Protestants	% Protestant	% of Protestant total
Oceania	30,809,781	13,474,012	43.73%	2.27%

== Maps ==
=== Europe ===
Approximate spread of Protestantism after the Reformation and following the Counter-Reformation. Crypto-Protestants are not shown.

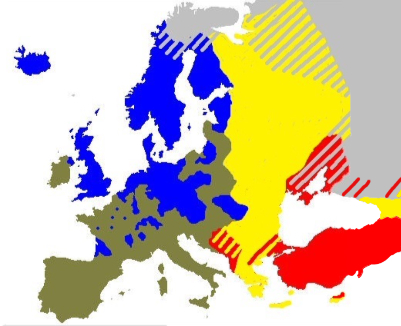
Approximate spread of Protestantism at the Reformation's peak. Crypto-Protestants, Crypto-papists and Crypto-Muslims are not shown.

The Protestant Reformation at its peak

After the Counter-Reformation. Crypto-Protestants are not shown.

After the Edict of Fontainebleau. Crypto-Protestants are not shown.

Modern spread after the Irish independence, Expulsion of Finns from Karelia and the Expulsions of Germans

=== World ===
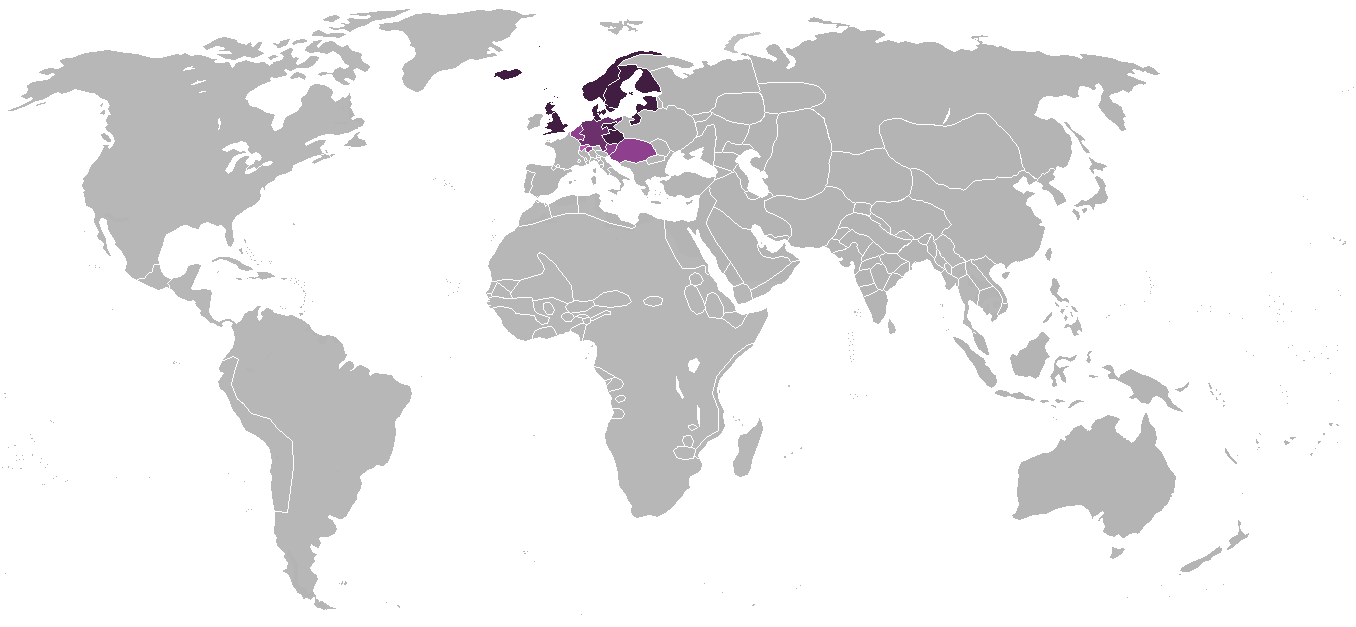
Countries by percentage of Protestants in 1545

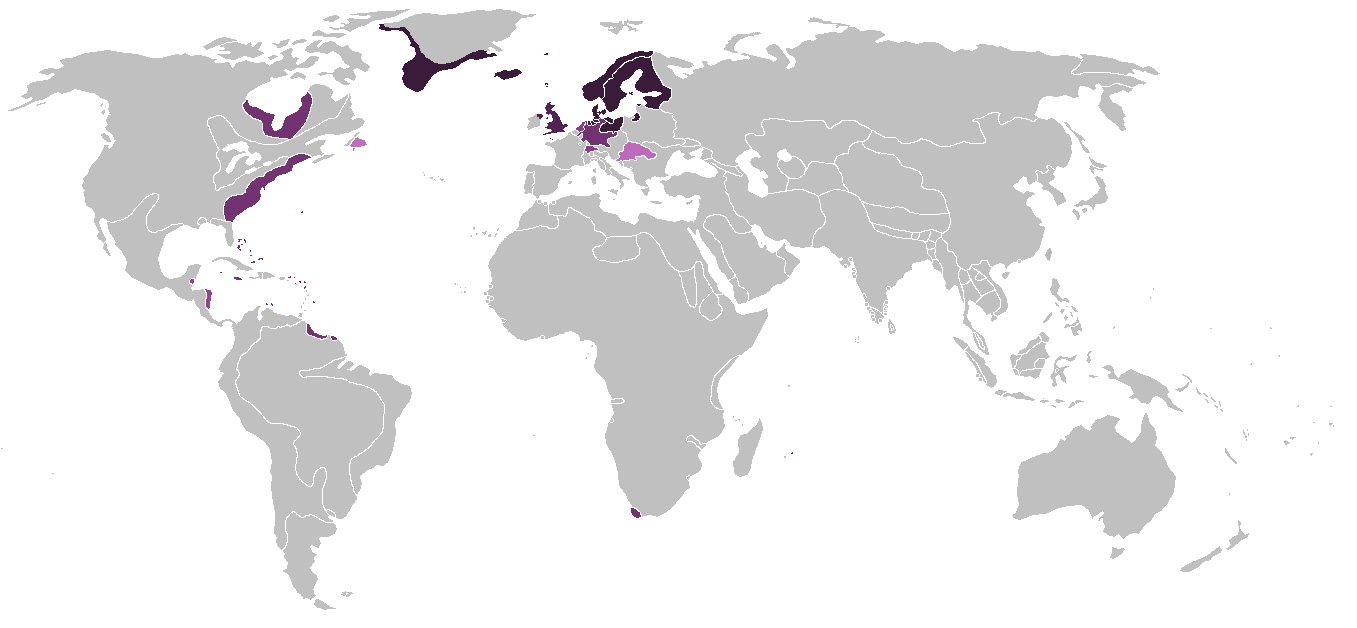
Countries by percentage of Protestants in 1710

Countries by percentage of Protestants in 1938

Countries by percentage of Protestants in 2010

Protestant majority countries in 1938

Protestant majority countries in 2010

== See also ==
- Christianity by country
- Catholic Church by country
- Eastern Orthodoxy by country
- List of Christian denominations by number of members
- List of the largest Protestant denominations
- Oriental Orthodoxy by country

=== Other religions ===
- List of religious populations
- Buddhism by country
- Hinduism by country
- Islam by country
- Irreligion § Demographics
- Jewish population by country
- Bahá'í statistics
