= Christianity by country =

Christian population percentage in 2011 by country

Christians made up 2.3 billion of the worldwide population of about 8 billion people in 2020 according to a 2025 Pew Research Center study. This represents 28.8% of the world's total population, making Christianity the largest global religion. The three biggest Christian denominations are the Catholic Church, Protestantism, and the Eastern Orthodox Church. The largest Christian denomination is the Catholic Church, with 1.3 billion baptized members. The second-largest Christian branch is either Protestantism or the Eastern Orthodox Church depending on whether Protestants are considered to be one group or divided into multiple denominations.

According to the Pew Research Center study, of the 201 countries and territories, 120 had Christian majorities in 2020, which was four fewer than in 2010.

Christianity is the predominant religion and faith in Europe, the Americas, Sub-Saharan Africa, and Oceania. There are also large Christian communities in other parts of the world, such as Central Asia, the Middle East, and West Africa where Christianity is the second-largest religion after Islam. The United States has the largest Christian population in the world, followed by Brazil, Mexico, Russia, and the Philippines.

Christianity in multiple forms is the state religion of the following 16 nations: Armenia (Armenian Apostolic Church), Tuvalu (Church of Tuvalu), Costa Rica (Catholic Church), Kingdom of Denmark (Evangelical Lutheran Church in Denmark), England (Church of England), Greece (Church of Greece), Georgia (Eastern Orthodox Church), Iceland (Church of Iceland), Liechtenstein (Catholic Church), Malta (Catholic Church), Monaco (Catholic Church), Vatican City (Catholic Church), Papua New Guinea, Samoa, and Zambia. Christianity used to be the state religion of the former Ethiopian Empire (adopted in 340 A.D. by the Kingdom of Aksum) prior to the government's overthrow.

== Lists ==
Population data are compiled using statistical science and are subject to observational error; these numbers should therefore be considered estimates only. The total number of Christians for each country is based on the number of people who are members of a Christian denomination or who identify themselves as Christian, plus their children. The number of people who actually believe in God or who regularly attend church is not addressed.

=== Top ten by numbers ===
A list of the top ten countries by largest number of Christians in 2020 according to Pew Research Center.

Rank	Country	Christians	% Christian
1	United States	217,270,000	64.0
2	Brazil	168,300,000	80.7
3	Mexico	113,070,000	89.2
4	Philippines	102,510,000	91.5
5	Russia	102,350,000	69.9
6	Nigeria	92,770,000	43.4
7	Congo DR	92,400,000	96.3
8	Ethiopia	73,230,000	61.6
9	South Africa	51,630,000	85.3
10	Italy	48,210,000	80.5

=== Top ten by percentage ===
A list of the top ten countries by highest percentage of the population in 2010 that is Christian according to Pew Research Center.

Rank	Country	% Christian	Christians
1	Vatican City	100.0%	800
2	Romania	99.0%	21,490,000
3	Papua New Guinea	99.0%	6,860,000
4	Timor-Leste	99.0%	1,120,000
5	Tonga	99.0%	100,000
6	Armenia	98.5%	3,090,000
7	Namibia	97.6%	2,280,000
8	Moldova	97.5%	3,570,000
9	Solomon Islands	97.5%	520,000
10	Marshall Islands	97.5%	50,000

=== UN members and dependent territories ===
Christianity by country
Country or entity	Christians (Note: Included Mormons)	% Christian (Note: Out of total valid answers (exclude unknown/refused to answer), whenever possible)	% Catholic	% Protestant / Orthodox / Other Christian
Afghanistan (details)	6,250/8,000 – 30,000	0.02%		
Albania (details)	384,833	19.0%	10.0%	9.0%
Algeria (details)	20,000 – 200,000 or 71,000 (estimate for 2010)	0.01%	0.01%	1.0%
American Samoa (details)	70,000	98.3%	20.0%	
Andorra (details)	78,000	89.5%	88.2%	1.3%
Angola (details)	27,285,828	79.1%	44.2%	34.9%
Anguilla (details)	15,000	90.5%	3.0%	87.0%
Antigua and Barbuda (details)	70,183	87.6%	8.6%	79.0%
Argentina (details)	34,940,108	77.0%	66.0%	11.0%
Armenia (details)	2,645,110	98.6%	0.6%	98.0%
Aruba (details)	83,128	82.3%	75.7%	6.6%
Australia (details)	11,148,814	43.9%	20%	24%
Austria (details)	6,093,700	68.2%	50% - 55.2%	3.0% – 7.0%
Azerbaijan (details)	280,000	3.1%		3.1%
Bahamas (details)	335,975	95.0%	12.0%	83.0%
Bahrain (details)	185,000	15.0%		9.0%
Bangladesh (details)	488,583	0.3%		
Barbados (details)	244,000	74.0%	4.2%	70.0%
Belarus (details)	5,265,000	59%	6%	53%
Belgium (details)	4,021,000 – 5,795,000	34% – 49%	31% – 44%	3% – 5%
Belize (details)	244,859	62.2%	32.2%	30.0%
Benin (details)	5,570,000	48.5%	25.5%	23%
Bermuda (details)	42,997	66.9%	14.5%	52.4%
Bhutan (details)	7,000	1.0%	0.1%	0.9%
Bolivia (details)	9,730,000	89.0%	76.0%	13.0%
Bosnia and Herzegovina (details)	1,622,093	45.94%	15.19%	30.75%
Botswana (details)	1,416,000	71.6%	5.0%	66.0%
Brazil (details)	147,634,177	83.7%	56.8%	26.9%
British Virgin Islands (details)	22,951	83.9%	9.0%	74.9%
Brunei (details)	29,462	6.7%		
Bulgaria (details)	4,219,270	81.6%	0.7%	80.9%
Burkina Faso (details)	4,787,272	26.3%	20.1%	6.2%
Burundi (details)	7,662,000	75.0%	60.0%	15.0%
Cambodia (details)	50,000	0.3%		
Cameroon (details)	15,390,000	73.0%	44.4%	29.3%
Canada (details)	19,373,325	53.3%	29.9%	23.4%
Cape Verde (details)	287,640	81.9%	72.0%	9.9%
Cayman Islands (details)	52,600	66.9%	13.6%	53.3%
Central African Republic (details)	2,302,000	80.0%	29.0%	51.0%
Chad (details)	4,150,000	35.0%	20.0%	15.0%
Chile (details)	11,061,994	73.2%	54.6%	18.6%
People's Republic of China (details)	31,220,000 – 49,170,000	2.5% – 3.5%	0.46% – 0.69%	2.0% – 2.89%
Colombia (details)	43,560,000	92.0%	79.0%	13.0%
Comoros (details)	15,000	2.1%		
Cook Islands (details)	11,980	79.9%	16.7%	63.2%
Congo, Republic of (details)	3,409,000	90.7%	50.0%	40.0%
Congo, Democratic Republic of (details)	92,400,000	93.1% (n.i. 2.8% Kimbanguist) – 95.8% – 96.3%	29.9% – 47.3%	48.5% – 63.2% (n.i. Kimbanguist)
Costa Rica (details)	4,000,000	82.0%	57.0%	25.0%
Côte d'Ivoire (details)	11,701,583	40.7%		
Croatia (details)	3,383,046	89.6%	80.7%	8.5%
Cuba (details)	6,670,000	65.0%	52.7%	7.5%
Curaçao (details)	130,585	86.1%	70.1%	16.0%
Cyprus (details)	718,067	94.0%	1.8%	92.2%
Czech Republic (details)	1,725,963	16.4%	13.4%	3.0%
Denmark (details)	4,480,000	76.9%	0.8%	76.1%
Djibouti (details)	4,455	0.4%		
Dominica (details)	58,089	85.0%	54.3%	30.7%
Dominican Republic (details)	9,734,000	83.0%	65.0%	18.0%
Ecuador (details)	14,099,000	94.0%	74.0%	20.0%
Egypt (details)	9,029,000	10.0%		
El Salvador (details)	5,073,000	81.9%	52.6%	29.3%
Equatorial Guinea (details)	683,000	88.7%	80.7%	8.0%
Eritrea (details)	3,577,000	67.0%	4.0%	54.0%
Estonia (details)	408,847	30.7%	0.9%	29.8%
Eswatini (details)	975,757	91.3%	3.4%	87.9%
Ethiopia (details)	73,230,000	61.6% - 62.8% - 67.3%	0.7%	62% - 62.1% - 66.6%
Falkland Islands (details)	3,000	94.3%		94.0%
Faroe Islands (details)	33,018	95.4%		94.0%
Fiji (details)	612,415	69.2%		
Finland (details)	3,619,666	64.2%	0.3%	63.9%
France (details)	25,744,860–33,874,816	38.0% (2020 est.) (Note: The 2020 survey of religion by INSEE was conducted on a nationally representative large sample (≈ 28,000) of people aged 18–49 and 18–59. It is reputed to be representative of the whole population of Metropolitan France, comprising French people without immigrant background, French people with immigrant background since various generations, as well as first-generation immigrant citizens.); 50% (2021 est.); 60.6%	29.0% – 47% - 57.5%	9.0% - 3% - 3.1%
Gabon (details)	1,081,000	88.0%	41.9%	46.1%
Gambia (details)	79,000	4.2%		
Georgia (details)	3,240,724	88.3%	0.5%	87.8%
Germany (details)	38,700,000	46.3%	23%	23.3%
Ghana (details)	21,932,708	71.3%	10.0%	61.3%
Gibraltar (details)	26,935	83.7%	72.1%	11.5%
Greece (details)	10,000,000	93.0%	<1.0%	
Greenland (details)	55,000	96.6%		96.6%
Grenada (details)	90,632	90.1%	33.9%	56.2%
Guatemala (details)	14,018,000	87.0%	47.0%	40.0%
Guinea (details)	1,032,000	8.9%	5.0%	5.0%
Guinea-Bissau (details)	318,021	26.2%		
Guyana (details)	477,284	63.9%	7.1%	56.8%
Haiti (details)	9,597,000	96.0%	80.0%	16.0%
Honduras (details)	6,660,000	88.0%	47.0%	41.0%
Hong Kong (details)	1,301,000	17.6%	5.4%	12.2%
Hungary (details)	5,254,179	52.87%	38.96%	13.91%
Iceland (details)	266,000	68.3%	3.9%	64.4%
India (details)	30,000,000	2.3%	1.3%	1.0%
Indonesia (details)	30,102,764	10.44%	3.06%	7.43%
Iran (details)	380,000 – 1,500,000	0.4% –1.5%		0.4% –1.5%
Iraq (details)	500,000	1.2%		1.2%
Ireland (details)	3,888,839	81.0%	73.8%	5.6%
Isle of Man (details)	40,725	54.6%		
Israel (details)	266,000	3.5%		3.5%
Italy (details)	48,210,000 - 53,230,000	80.5% - 83.0%	81.2%	2.0%
Jamaica (details)	1,848,607	70.5%	2.2%	68.3%
Japan (details)	1,872,320	1.1%	0.5%	0.6%
Jordan (details)	388,000	6.0%		
Kazakhstan (details)	3,300,000	17.2%		
Kenya (details)	37,086,506	78.7%	20.6%	58.1%
Kiribati (details)	116,474	97.6%	59.0%	38.7%
Korea, North (details)	406,000	1.7%		
Korea, South (details)	16,028,890	31.0%	11.0%	20.0%
Kuwait (details)	458,000	15.0%	3.2%	12.8%
Kyrgyzstan (details)	610,000 – 944,000	11.4% – 17.0%		
Laos (details)	112,230	1.7%		
Latvia (details)	1,570,000	70.0% – 80.0%	24.1% – 25.1%	46.8% – 54.9%
Lebanon (details)	1,600,000 –1,800,000	38.0% – 41.0%	26.0%	15.0%
Lesotho (details)	1,876,000	90.0%	45.0%	45.0%
Liberia (details)	4,458,286	84.9%		
Libya (details)	170,000	2.7%	0.5%	1.5%
Liechtenstein (details)	30,912	82.4%	72.5%	10.0%
Lithuania (details)	2,236,185	92.2%	86.0%	6.2%
Luxembourg (details)	360,000	72.4%	68.7%	3.7%
Madagascar (details)	22,322,966	85.0%		
Malawi (details)	13,581,623	77.3%	17.2%	60.1%
Malaysia (details)	2,941,049	9.0%		
Maldives (details)	300 - 1,400	0.08%		
Mali (details)	484,857	2.3%		
Malta (details)	399,983	88.5%	82.6%	5.9%
Marshall Islands (details)	40,003	96.2%	9.3%	86.9%
Mauritania (details)	5,000	0.14%		
Mauritius (details)	398,212	32.3%	25.0%	7.3%
Mexico (details)	111,959,525	89.1%	78.0%	11.2%
Micronesia, Federated States of (details)	101,468	98.7%	54.7%	44.0%
Moldova (details)	2,602,368	99.6%	0.1%	99.5%
Monaco (details)	30,000	82.6%	77.0	
Mongolia (details)	42,859	1.3%		
Montenegro (details)	467,349	76.5%	3.3%	73.2%
Montserrat (details)	3,586	84.1%	10.6%	73.5%
Morocco (details)	336,000	1.0%		
Mozambique (details)	12,287,678	62.0%	27.3%	34.7%
Myanmar (details)	3,790,000	6.2%	1.0%	5.2%
Namibia (details)	1,991,000	90.0%	13.7%	76.3%
Nauru (details)	10,975	94.4%	34.0%	60.4%
Nepal (details)	512,313	1.8%		
Netherlands (details)	5,382,883	30.0% (2023)	17.0% (registered, 2023)	14.0% (2023)
New Zealand (details)	1,738,638 (2018)	37.0% (2018)	10.0% (2018)	27.0% (2018)
Nicaragua (details)	5,217,000	84.6%	58.8%	25.8%
Niger (details)	56,856	0.3%		5.0%
Nigeria (details)	74,400,000 –92,770,000 – 107,000,000	43.4% – 45.9%	10.6%	35.3%
North Macedonia (details)	1,100,732	64.6%	0.4%	64.2%
Norway (details)	3,844,000	76.7% (2018)	2.4%	73.8% (2018)
Oman (details)	180,000	6.5%		
Pakistan (details)	3,300,788	1.4%		
Palau (details)	14,148 (Note: Another 867 people believed in Modekngei, a religion considered as partially Christian)	80.3%	46.4%	33.9%
Panama (details)	3,057,000	92.0%	80.0%	12.0%
Papua New Guinea (details)	6,800,000	97.0%	27.0%	70.0%
Paraguay (details)	6,260,000	96.0%	88.0%	8.0%
Peru (details)	29,519,000	94.5%	76.0%	18.5%
Philippines (details)	92,746,021	85.3%	78.8%	6.5%
Pitcairn Islands (details)	50	100.0%		100.0%
Poland (details)	27,550,861	72.4%	71.4%	1%
Portugal (details)	7,445,000	84.8%	80.2%	4.6%
Puerto Rico (details)	3,878,000	89.0%	56.0%	33.0%
Qatar (details)	263,000	13.8%		
Romania (details)	16,155,689	98.5%	5.2%	93.3%
Russia (details)	102,400,000	69.9%		
Rwanda (details)	12,201,213	92.2%	40.0%	52.3%
Saint Helena (details)	3,436	86.4%	2.4%	84.0%
Saint Kitts and Nevis (details)	39,206	83.2%	5.9%	77.2%
Saint Lucia (details)	133,001	80.7%	52.8%	27.9%
Saint Vincent and the Grenadines (details)	89,891	86.4%	6.6%	79.8%
Samoa (details)	183,559	89.3%	18.0%	71.3%
San Marino (details)	31,000	91.6%	90.5%	1.1%
São Tomé and Príncipe (details)	127,938	72.3%	56.3%	16.0%
Saudi Arabia (details)	1,500,000	5.0%		
Senegal (details)	570,000	4.2%		
Serbia (details)	5,758,719	86.68%	3.87%	82.81%
Seychelles (details)	76,937	84.7%	69.3%	15.4%
Sierra Leone (details)	619,000 – 1,294,000	10.0% –20.9%		
Singapore (details)	654,355	18.9%	7.0%	11.9%
Slovakia (details)	3,748,000	68.8%	59.8%	9.0%
Slovenia (details)	1,610,000	68.0%	64.0%	4.0%
Solomon Islands (details)	696,324	96.6%	20.0%	76.6%
Somalia (details)	1,000	0.01%		
South Africa (details)	51,630,000 - 52,886,000	85.3%	5.0%	75.0%
South Sudan (details)	6,010,000	60.5%	30.0%	30.0%
Spain (details)	28,000,000	59.2%	58.2%	1.0%
Sri Lanka (details)	1,552,161	7.6%	6.2%	1.4%
Sudan (details)	525,000	1.5%		
Suriname (details)	262,000	48.4% – 51.6%	21.6%	26.8%
Sweden (details)	6,577,478	64.3%	1.2%	63.1%
Switzerland (details)	5,700,000	66.9% – 69.1%	36.5% – 37.9%	30.4% – 31.2%
Syria (details)	1,800,000	10.0%	2.0%	8.0%
Tajikistan (details)	110,000	1.4%	0.1%	1.3%
Tanzania (details)	31,342,000	61.4%		
Thailand (details)	768,000	1.1%		
Timor-Leste (details)	1,242,668	99.5%	97.5%	2.0%
Togo (details)	3,965,800	49.2%	21%	28%
Tonga (details)	97,075	97.8%	13.7%	84.0%
Trinidad and Tobago (details)	743,105	63.2%	24.3%	38.9%
Tunisia (details)	30,000 (Note: Tunisia's Ministry of Religious Affairs estimates there are approximately 30,000 Christians residing in the country, of which the majority are foreigners and about 80% of whom are Roman Catholic. Approximately 7000 Christians are Tunisian Citizens, mostly Anglicans and other Protestants.)			
Turkey (details)	120,000 – 310,000	0.2%		
Turkmenistan (details)	466,000	9.0%		9.0%
Turks and Caicos Islands (details)	6,442	87.6%	5.7%	82.0%
Tuvalu (details)	10,040	95.7%	0.5%	95.2%
Uganda (details)	37,489,984	84.5%	37.4%	47.0%
Ukraine (details)	34,830,000	81.9%	7.5%	74.4%
United Arab Emirates (details)	940,000	9.0%	7.0%	2.0%
United Kingdom (details)	25,585,000 – 31,889,000	38.0% – 47.7%	7.0%	31.0%
United States (details)	217,270,000	62% – 69%	19% – 21.8%	43% – 47.2%
Uruguay (details)	1,510,000	60.8%		
Uzbekistan (details)	710,000	2.6%		2.6%
Vanuatu (details)	245,163	83.5%	12.1%	71.4%
Venezuela (details)	28,340,000	88.0%	71.0%	17.0%
Vietnam (details)	6,831,000	7.1%	6.1%	1.0%
Yemen (details)	25,000 – 41,000	0.01%	0.01%	
Zambia (details)	19,300,000	98.0%	17.9%	80.0%
Zimbabwe (details)	12,937,804	85.2%	6.4%	78.8%
Europe	565,560,000	76.2%	35.0%	41.2%
Latin America and the Caribbean	531,280,000	90.0%	70.0%	20.0%
Africa	526,016,926	62.7%	21.0%	41.7%
Asia	285,120,000 –375,905,000	7.0% –12.0%	3.0% –5.1%	4.0% –6.8%
North America	266,630,000	77.4%	22.0%	55.4%
Oceania	25,754,000	73.3%	38.9%	34.4%
Middle East-North Africa	12,000,000 –16,000,000	3.8% –5.0%	2.0% –2.6%	1.8% – 2.3%
Total	2,431,209,718	33.4%	16.9%	16.5%

=== Other states ===
State	Christians	% Christian
Abkhazia (details)	130,000	68.0%
Kosovo (details)	150,000	8.7%
Palestine (details) (2020)	173,000	1.0%
Sahrawi Arab Democratic Republic (details)	200	0.03%
South Ossetia (details)	69,000	96.4%
Taiwan (details) (2026)	902,000	6.5%
Transnistria (details)	510,000	95.0%
Vatican City (details) (2026)	836	100.0%

== Population growth ==
According to World Population Review, there were 2.38 billion Christians around the world in 2021. According to a 2012 Pew Research Center survey, if current trends continue, Christianity will remain the world's largest religion by year 2050. According to a 2015 Pew Research Center study, Christianity is estimated to reach 3 billion adherents out of a projected population of 9.3 billion people in 2050, achieving parity with Muslim populations for the first time in history, which are predicted to be about 2.8 billion in 2050.

In 21st century, Christianity lost its majority status in the United Kingdom, Australia and France where no religion/religiously unaffiliated forms majority. On the other hand, countries such as Madagascar and South Sudan gained a christian majority in 20th and 21st century, whereas Christianity replaced Buddhism as the largest religion of South Korea.

Demographics of major traditions within Christianity (Pew Research Center, 2010 data)
Tradition	Followers	% of the Christian population	% of the world population	Follower dynamics	Dynamics inside and outside Christianity
Catholicism	1,200,000,000	52.4	15.9	▲ Growing	Stable
Protestantism	800,640,000	34.9	11.6	▲ Growing	▲ Growing
Orthodoxy	260,380,000	11.4	3.8	▲ Growing	▲ Growing
Other Christianity	28,430,000	1.3	0.4	▲ Growing	▲ Growing
Christianity	2,289,450,000	100	31.7	▲ Growing	Stable

Demographics of major traditions within Christianity 2025
Tradition	Followers	% of the Christian population	% of the world population
Catholicism	1,272,775,000	48.1	15.54
Protestantism	628,862,000	23.77	7.67
Orthodoxy	291,580,000	11.01	3.56
Other Christianity	452,795,124	17.12	5.53
Christianity	2,646,012,124	100	32.3

== See also ==
- List of Christian denominations by number of members
- Catholic Church by country
- Eastern Orthodoxy by country
- Oriental Orthodoxy by country
- Protestantism by country
- List of the largest Protestant denominations

Other religions:

- Baháʼí Faith by country
- Ahmadiyya by country
- Buddhism by country
- Hinduism by country
- Irreligion by country
- Islam by country
- Jewish population by country
- Judaism by country
- Sikhism by country

General:

- List of religious populations
