= Hinduism in Andorra =

Hinduism is a minority religion in Andorra, where Christian forms the majority. It's also the third largest religion in the country, after Christianity and Islam. In 2015, there were 390 (0.5%) Hindus in Andorra. Majority of Hindus in the country are immigrants from India, who had mainly come for jobs and business purpose.

== Demographics ==
Historical Population
Year	Pop.	±%
2001	337	—
2010	340	+0.9%
2011	377	+10.9%
2015	390	+3.4%

Year	Percent	Increase
2001	0.5%	-
2010	0.5%	-
2011	0.4%	-0.1%
2015	0.5%	+0.1%
