= List of religious populations =

2020 estimation of major religious groups
Religion	Percent
Christianity	28.8%
Islam	25.6%
Unaffiliated	24.2%
Hinduism	14.9%
Buddhism	4.1%
Other religions	2.4%

This is a list of religious populations by number of adherents and countries.

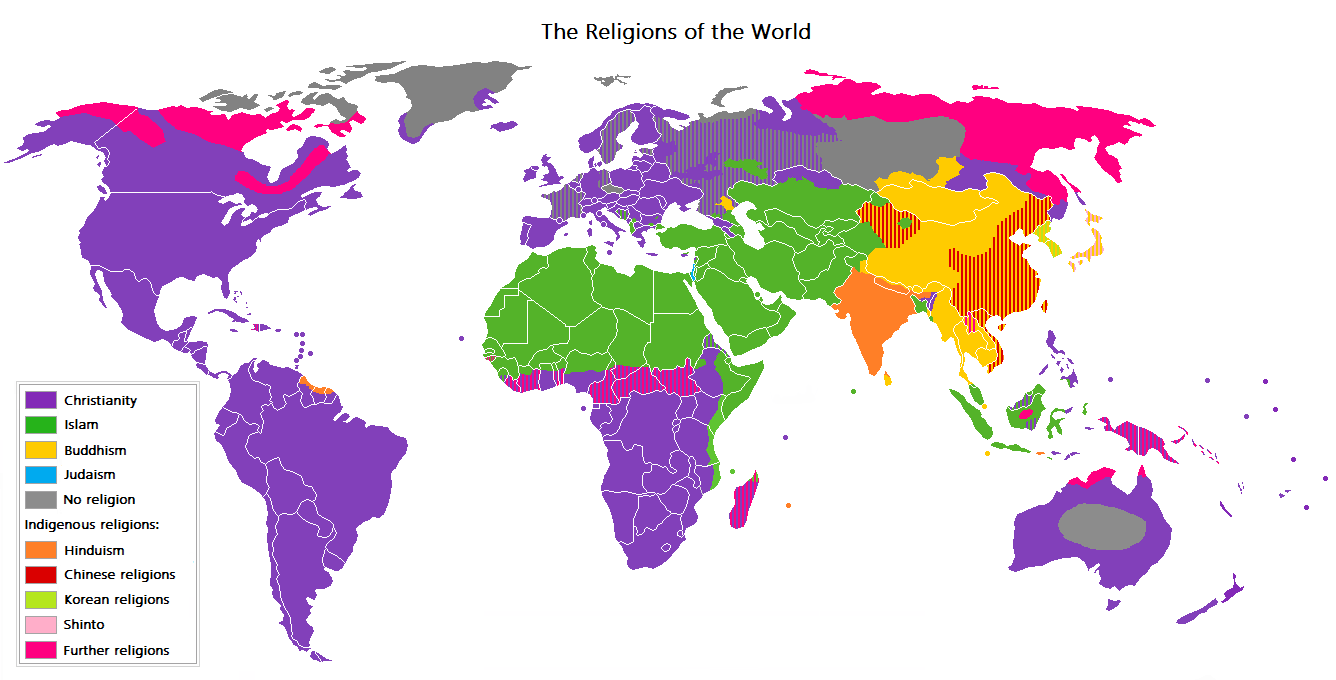
A map of the world, showing the major religions distributed in the world as of today

== Current world estimates ==
Pew Research Center published in 2025 an estimation of the proportions of the major religious groups in 2020.

=== Largest religion by country ===
A map showing the prevailing religious population by country based on the Pew Research Center's 2010 baseline estimates.

== By proportion ==
=== Christians ===
Countries and territories with the greatest proportion of Christians from Christianity by country, in 2010:

Christian population percentage by country, June 2014.

1. Vatican City 100% (100% Roman Catholic)
2. Pitcairn Islands 100% (100% Seventh-day Adventist)
3. East Timor 99.6% (mostly Roman Catholic)
4. Samoa ~99.0% (mostly Protestant)
5. Armenia 98.5% (96% Oriental Orthodox)
6. American Samoa 98.3% (mostly Protestant; ARDA claim)
7. Malta 98.1% (mostly Roman Catholic)
8. Venezuela 98.0% (71% Roman Catholic)
9. Greece 98.0% (95% Eastern Orthodox)
10. Marshall Islands 97.2% (mostly Protestant)
11. Tonga 97.2% (mostly Protestant)
12. San Marino 97.0% (~97% Roman Catholic)
13. Paraguay 96.9% (mostly Roman Catholic)
14. El Salvador 96.4% (mostly Roman Catholic; ARDA claim)
15. Kiribati 96.0% (mostly Protestant)
16. Federated States of Micronesia ~96.0% (mostly Protestant)
17. Barbados 95.1% (mostly Protestant)
18. Papua New Guinea 94.8% (mostly Protestant; ARDA claim)
19. Mexico 94.6% (mostly Roman Catholic)
20. Peru 94.5% (mostly Roman Catholic)
21. Romania 93.0% (mostly Eastern Orthodox)
22. Poland 92.9% (mostly Roman Catholic)
23. Croatia 91.1% (mostly Roman Catholic)

=== Muslims ===
Countries and territories with a considerable proportion of Muslims from Islam by country in 2010, excluding foreign workers in brackets:

Muslim Percentage by country, 2020

1. Maldives 100%
2. Mauritania 99.9%
3. Morocco 99.9%
4. Yemen 99.8% (65% Sunni, 35% Shia)
5. Somalia 99.7%
6. Afghanistan 99.7% (90% Sunni, 10% Shia)
7. Iran 99.6% (95% Shia, 5% Sunni)
8. Tunisia 99.5%
9. Azerbaijan 99.2% (55% Shia, 45% Sunni)
10. (Palestine) Gaza Strip 99.0%
11. Iraq 99.0% (60% Shia, 40% Sunni)
12. Niger 99.0% (mostly Sunni)
13. Turkey 98.6% (85% Sunni, 15% Shia)
14. Comoros 98.3%
15. Algeria 98.0%
16. Tajikistan 97.9%
17. Saudi Arabia 97.2% (90% Sunni, 10% Shia)
18. Sudan 97.0%
19. Djibouti 96.9%
20. Libya 96.6%
21. Pakistan 96.4% (85% Sunni, 12% Shia, 3% Other)
22. Uzbekistan 96.3%
23. Egypt 94.6%
24. Syria 92.2% (80% Sunni, 20% Shia)

=== Irreligious and atheists ===
Countries with the greatest proportion of people without religion, including agnostics and atheists, from Irreligion by country in 2020:

Nonreligious population by country in 2010.

1. China 89.6%
2. North Korea 72.9%
3. Czech Republic 72.8%
4. Hong Kong 71.4%
5. Vietnam 67.7%
6. Macau 67.6%
7. Japan 57.5%
8. Netherlands 54.1%
9. Uruguay 52.4%
10. New Zealand 51.4%
11. South Korea 48.3%
12. Estonia 43.6%
13. France 42.6%
14. Australia 42.3%
15. Mongolia 40.8%
16. United Kingdom 40.2%
17. Belgium 39.0%
18. Germany 36.1%
19. Canada 34.6%
20. Slovenia 32.3%
21. Switzerland 30.8%
22. Chile 30.3%
23. United States 29.7%
24. Sweden 28.9%
25. Hungary 27.0%
26. Spain 26.4%
27. Luxembourg 25.3%
28. Slovakia 25.3%
29. Finland 25.0%
30. Jamaica 23.7%

Data is ranked by mean estimate in parentheses. Irreligious includes agnostic, atheist, secular people, and those having no formal religious adherence. It does not necessarily mean that those of this group don't belong to any religion. Some religions have harmonized with local cultures and can be seen as a cultural background rather than a formal religion. The practice of officially associating a family or household with a religion, while not formally practicing the affiliated religion, is common in many countries. Thus, over half of this group is theistic and/or influenced by religious principles, but nonreligious/non-practicing and not true atheists or agnostics. See Spiritual but not religious.

=== Hindus ===
Countries with the greatest proportion of Hindus from Hinduism by country in 2020:

Hindu population by country in 2010

1. Nepal 81.2%
2. India 79.4%
3. Mauritius 48.3%
4. Fiji 24.1%
5. Guyana 23.4%
6. Bhutan 22.5%
7. Suriname 22.5%
8. Trinidad and Tobago 20.6%
9. Sri Lanka 14.5%
10. United Arab Emirates 11.8%
11. Bahrain 11.2%
12. Qatar 10.6%
13. Oman 9.5%
14. Kuwait 8.5%
15. Bangladesh 7.9%
16. Malaysia 6.1%
17. Singapore 5.3%
18. Réunion 4.5%
19. Australia 3%
20. New Zealand 2.8%
21. Saudi Arabia 2.6%
22. Maldives 2.5%
23. Pakistan 2.1%
24. Curaçao 2%
25. United Kingdom 1.7%
26. French Guiana 1.6%
27. Indonesia 1.6%
28. Canada 1.5%
29. Malta 1.4%
30. Seychelles 1.4%

=== Buddhists ===
Countries with the greatest proportion of Buddhists from Buddhism by country in 2010:

Buddhist population by country in 2010

1. Cambodia 96.9%
2. Thailand 93.2%
3. Myanmar 80.1%
4. Bhutan 74.7%
5. Sri Lanka 69.3%
6. Laos 66.0%
7. Mongolia 55.1%
8. Japan 36.2% - 66.7% (Note: Population figures from the Agency for Cultural Affairs Religious Yearbook 2019, as of the end of 2018, are as follows: Shinto: 80,219,808 Buddhism: 91,336,539 Christianity: 1,921,484 Other: 7,851,545 Percentages calculated using the official total population figure of 126,435,000 as of the end of 2018.)
9. Taiwan 35.1%
10. Singapore 33.2%
11. South Korea 22.9%
12. Malaysia 19.8%
13. China 18.2%
14. Macau 17.3%
15. Vietnam 16.4%
16. Hong Kong 13.2%
17. Northern Mariana Islands 10.6%
18. Nepal 10.3%
19. Brunei 8.6%
20. Qatar 3.1%
21. Kuwait 2.8%
22. Australia 2.7%
23. Bahrain 2.5%
24. United Arab Emirates 2.0%
25. New Zealand 1.6%
26. North Korea 1.5%
27. United States 1.2%
28. Nauru 1.1%

=== Chinese traditional religionists ===
As a spiritual practice, Taoism has made fewer inroads in the West than Buddhism and Hinduism. Despite the popularity of its great classics the I Ching and the Tao Te Ching, the practice of Taoism has not been promulgated in America with much success. These religions are not ubiquitous worldwide in the way that adherents of bigger world religions are, and they remain primarily an ethnic religion. Nonetheless, Taoist ideas and symbols such as taijitu have become popular throughout the world through tai chi, qigong, and various martial arts.

1. Taiwan 33.0–80.0%
2. China 30.0%
3. Hong Kong 28.0%
4. Macau 13.9%
5. Singapore 8.5%
6. Malaysia 2.6%
7. South Korea 0.2–1.0%
8. Philippines 0.01–0.05%
9. Indonesia 0.05%

In 1999, the Chinese traditional religion had 184,000 believers in Latin America, 250,000 believers in Europe, and 839,000 believers in North America.

=== Ethnic and indigenous religionists ===
Indigenous statistics come from the 2009 U.S. Department of State's International Religious Freedom Act, based on the highest estimate of people identified as indigenous or followers of indigenous religions that have been well-defined. Due to the syncretic nature of these religions, the numbers may not reflect the actual number of practitioners.

1. Togo 35.6%
2. South Sudan 32.9%
3. Guinea-Bissau 30.9%
4. North Korea 29.5%
5. Ivory Coast 25.0%
6. Sudan 25.0%
7. Burundi 20.0%
8. Burkina Faso 15.0%
9. South Africa 15.0%
10. Democratic Republic of the Congo 12.0%
11. Benin 10.5%
12. Central African Republic 10.0%
13. Gabon 10.0%
14. Lesotho 10.0%
15. Nigeria 10.0%
16. Sierra Leone 10.0%
17. Kenya 9.0%
18. Palau 9.0%
19. Ghana 8.5%
20. Guinea 5.0%

=== Sikhs ===
Countries with the greatest proportion of Sikhs:

Sikhism by country

1. Canada 2.12%
2. India 1.72% (Note: The Indian Sikh population grew from 16,420,685 to 19,237,391 between 1991 and 2001, a rise of 2,816,706 or 17.15%. It further rose from 19,237,391 to 20,833,116 between 1991 and 2001, a rise of 1,595,725 or 8.29%. Assuming the Indian Sikh population growth rate continues to decline at the same rate, which is likely since Sikhs have the lowest birth rate across all Indian religious groups, the Indian Sikh population would grow by 4.01% between 2011 and 2021, or from 20,833,116 to 21,668,524.)
3. Cyprus 1.10%
4. United Kingdom 0.88%
5. New Zealand 0.88%
6. Australia 0.83%
7. Oman 0.75%
8. United Arab Emirates 0.56%
9. Italy 0.37%
10. Singapore 0.35%

The Sikh homeland is the Punjab state, in India, where Sikhs make up approximately 58% of the population. This is the only place where Sikhs are in the majority. Sikhs have emigrated to countries all over the world – especially to English-speaking and East Asian nations. In doing so they have retained, to an unusually high degree, their distinctive cultural and religious identity.

Sikhs are not ubiquitous worldwide in the way that adherents of larger world religions are, and they remain primarily an ethnic religion. They can be found in many international cities and have become an especially strong religious presence in the United Kingdom and Canada. Sikhism is the fastest growing religion in New Zealand and Australia.

=== Spiritists ===
The data come from ARDA if no other specific source is provided.

1. Cuba 10.3%
2. Jamaica 10.2%
3. Suriname 3.6%
4. Haiti 2.7%
5. Dominican Republic 2.2%
6. The Bahamas 1.9%
7. Brazil 1.8%
8. Nicaragua 1.5%
9. Trinidad and Tobago 1.4%
10. Guyana 1.3%
11. Venezuela 1.1%
12. Colombia 1.0%
13. Belize 1.0%
14. Honduras 0.9%
15. Puerto Rico 0.7%
16. Panama 0.5%
17. Iceland 0.5%
18. Guadeloupe 0.4%
19. Argentina 0.2%
20. Guatemala 0.2%

=== Jews ===
Countries with the greatest proportion of Jews in 2017:

Jewish population by country in 2020

1. Israel 73.60%
2. Gibraltar 2.00%
3. United States 1.76%
4. Canada 1.07%
5. France 0.70%
6. Hungary 0.485%
7. Uruguay 0.483%
8. Australia 0.47%
9. United Kingdom 0.44%
10. Argentina 0.41%
11. U.S. Virgin Islands 0.36%
12. Belgium 0.259%
13. Panama 0.25%
14. Latvia 0.24%
15. Switzerland 0.22%
16. Netherlands 0.17%
17. Estonia 0.154%
18. Bermuda 0.154%
19. Sweden 0.152%
20. Germany 0.14%
21. South Africa 0.124%
22. Ukraine 0.124%
23. Russia 0.122%
24. Denmark 0.112%
25. New Zealand 0.11%

== By population ==
=== Christians ===
Largest Christian populations in 2020:

1. United States 217,270,000
2. Brazil 168,300,000
3. Mexico 113,070,000
4. Philippines 102,510,000
5. Russia 102,350,000
6. Nigeria 92,770,000
7. Democratic Republic of the Congo 92,400,000
8. Ethiopia 73,230,000
9. South Africa 51,630,000
10. Italy 48,210,000
11. Germany 47,030,000
12. Kenya 44,730,000
13. Colombia 43,670,000
14. Argentina 39,970,000
15. Tanzania 39,440,000
16. Uganda 39,010,000
17. Ukraine 37,280,000
18. Poland 34,810,000
19. United Kingdom 33,250,000
20. Spain 33,120,000
21. Angola 31,120,000
22. India 31,060,000
23. Peru 31,030,000
24. France 30,620,000
25. Indonesia 28,200,000
26. China 25,450,000
27. Venezuela 25,060,000
28. Ghana 22,730,000
29. Madagascar 21,490,000
30. Canada 20,350,000

=== Muslims ===
Largest Muslim populations in 2020:

1. Indonesia 238,990,000 (details)
2. Pakistan 226,880,000
3. India 213,060,000
4. Bangladesh 151,440,000
5. Nigeria 119,980,000
6. Egypt 104,040,000
7. Iran 87,520,000
8. Turkey 83,600,000
9. Sudan 46,250,000
10. Algeria 43,330,000
11. Iraq 41,910,000
12. Afghanistan 39,020,000
13. Morocco 36,470,000
14. Yemen 36,090,000
15. Uzbekistan 32,120,000
16. Saudi Arabia 28,730,000
17. China 25,980,000
18. Niger 23,270,000
19. Malaysia 21,730,000
20. Mali 20,440,000
21. Syria 19,820,000
22. Tanzania 18,210,000
23. Somalia 16,620,000
24. Senegal 16,380,000
25. Kazakhstan 15,180,000
26. Burkina Faso 14,480,000
27. Ivory Coast 13,390,000
28. Russia 11,990,000
29. Tunisia 11,890,000
30. Guinea 11,610,000

=== Irreligious and atheists ===
Largest religiously unaffiliated populations in 2020:

1. China 1,278,120,000
2. United States 100,910,000
3. Japan 72,570,000
4. Vietnam 66,370,000
5. Germany 30,230,000
6. Russia 29,560,000
7. Brazil 28,110,000
8. France 28,110,000
9. United Kingdom 27,090,000
10. South Korea 25,030,000
11. North Korea 19,040,000
12. Mexico 13,480,000
13. Canada 13,220,000
14. Spain 12,570,000
15. Australia 10,900,000
16. Netherlands 9,540,000
17. Italy 7,950,000
18. Czech Republic 7,680,000
19. Ukraine 6,770,000
20. Madagascar 6,460,000
21. Chile 5,860,000
22. Taiwan 5,460,000
23. Hong Kong 5,340,000
24. Colombia 5,030,000
25. Belgium 4,500,000
26. Mozambique 4,400,000
27. Argentina 4,170,000
28. Poland 3,300,000
29. Sweden 2,990,000
30. Venezuela 2,770,000

=== Hindus ===
Largest Hindu populations in 2020:

1. India 1,113,200,000
2. Nepal 23,520,000
3. Bangladesh 13,140,000
4. Pakistan 5,030,000
5. Indonesia 4,350,000
6. Sri Lanka 3,280,000
7. United States 3,040,000
8. Malaysia 2,070,000
9. United Kingdom 1,140,000
10. United Arab Emirates 1,110,000
11. Saudi Arabia 810,000
12. Australia 760,000
13. South Africa 640,000
14. Mauritius 620,000
15. Canada 580,000
16. Oman 430,000
17. Kuwait 370,000
18. Trinidad and Tobago 310,000
19. Qatar 300,000
20. Singapore 300,000
21. Italy 260,000
22. Myanmar 230,000
23. Fiji 220,000
24. Guyana 190,000
25. Bhutan 170,000
26. Bahrain 170,000
27. New Zealand 140,000
28. Suriname 140,000
29. Germany 130,000
30. Russia 100,000

=== Buddhists ===
Largest Buddhist populations in 2020.

1. Thailand 67,620,000
2. China 53,380,000
3. Myanmar 47,210,000
4. Japan 46,990,000
5. Vietnam 22,580,000
6. Cambodia 16,240,000
7. Sri Lanka 15,700,000
8. South Korea 9,850,000
9. India 9,550,000
10. Malaysia 6,400,000
11. United States 3,800,023
12. Indonesia 2,062,000
13. Bangladesh 1,001,974
14. Australia 670,000
15. Canada 660,000
16. Hong Kong 630,000
17. Bhutan 580,000
18. Russia 520,000
19. France 470,000
20. North Korea 400,000

=== Sikhs ===
Largest Sikh population in 2023

1. India 23,786,000 (Note: Sikhs comprise 1.7% (23,786,052) of India's total population of 1,399,179,585 per 2023 estimate by the World Factbook.)
2. Canada 771,790
3. United Kingdom 524,000
4. United States ~280,000 (Note: While the U.S. census does not ask about religion, 70,697 Americans (or 0.02% of the total population) declared Sikh as their ethnicity in the 2020 census. In the 2021 Canadian census, 194,640 Canadians declared Sikh as their ethnicity while 771,790 Canadians declared Sikh as their religion, indicating that the Sikh American population may be around 280,329, or 0.08% of the total population. The U.S. Census Bureau estimated the adult Sikh American population at 78,000 in 2008. The Pew Research Center estimated the Sikh American adult population to be 140,000 and the total population at 200,000 in 2012 while the World Religion Database at Boston University estimated the American Sikh population to be at 280,000 in 2012. Sikh organizations like the Sikh Coalition and American Sikh Congressional Caucus estimate the Sikh American population to be as high as 1,000,000, but do not provide any sources for these figures; 500,000 nevertheless remains the most cited Sikh American population size in news media. With 1% of Asian Americans being Sikh, and 90.7% of Sikh Americans being Asian American, the American Sikh population can be estimated around 280,000-500,000 in 2021.)
5. Australia 210,400
6. Italy 210,000
7. Malaysia 100,000
8. Thailand 70,000
9. United Arab Emirates 52,000
10. Philippines 50,000
11. New Zealand 40,908
12. Oman 35,540
13. Portugal 35,000
14. France 30,000
15. Spain 26,000
16. Germany 25,000
17. Bangladesh 23,000
18. Greece 20,000
19. Kuwait 15,000
20. Hong Kong 15,000
21. Netherlands 15,000

=== Jews ===
Largest Jewish populations in 2017:

1. Israel 6,451,000
2. United States 5,700,000
3. France 456,000
4. Canada 390,000
5. United Kingdom 289,500
6. Argentina 180,500
7. Russia 176,000
8. Germany 116,500
9. Australia 113,200
10. Brazil 93,800
11. South Africa 69,300
12. Ukraine 53,000
13. Hungary 47,500
14. Mexico 40,000
15. Netherlands 29,800
16. Belgium 29,300
17. Italy 27,300
18. Switzerland 18,700
19. Chile 18,300
20. Uruguay 16,900
21. Turkey 15,300
22. Sweden 15,000
23. Spain 11,800
24. Belarus 10,000
25. Panama 10,000

=== Baháʼís ===
Largest Baháʼí populations in 2010 in countries with a national population ≥200,000:

1. India 1,897,651
2. United States 512,864
3. Kenya 422,782
4. Vietnam 388,802
5. Bangladesh 300,000
6. Democratic Republic of the Congo 282,916
7. Philippines 275,069
8. Iran 251,127
9. Zambia 241,112
10. South Africa 238,532
11. Bolivia 215,359
12. Tanzania 190,419
13. Venezuela 169,811
14. Uganda 95,098
15. Chad 94,499
16. Pakistan 87,259
17. Myanmar 78,915
18. Colombia 70,504
19. Malaysia 67,549
20. Thailand 65,096
21. Papua New Guinea 59,898

=== Jains ===
In 2005, per ARDA:

1. India 5,146,697
2. United States 79,459
3. Kenya 68,848
4. United Kingdom 35,000
5. Canada 12,101
6. Tanzania 9,002
7. Nepal 6,800
8. Uganda 2,663
9. Myanmar 2,398
10. Malaysia 2,052
11. South Africa 1,918
12. Fiji 1,573
13. Japan 1,535
14. Belgium 1,500
15. Australia 1,449
16. Suriname 1,217
17. Ireland 1,000
18. Bangladesh 1,000
19. Réunion 981
20. Hong Kong 500 families
21. Yemen 229

=== Zoroastrians ===
In 2012, per FEZANA:

1. India 61,000
2. Iran 25,271
3. United States 14,405
4. Canada 6,442
5. United Kingdom 5,500
6. Australia 2,577

== See also ==
- Major religious groups
- World religions
- Importance of religion by country
- Religious demographics

Religions:

- Religions by country
- History of the Baháʼí Faith
- Buddhism by country
- Christianity by country
  - Catholic Church by country
  - Protestantism by country
  - Eastern Orthodoxy by country
  - Oriental Orthodoxy by country
- Hinduism by country
- Islam by country
  - Ahmadiyya by country
- Judaism by country
- Sikhism by country
