= Oriental Orthodoxy by country =

Distribution of Oriental Orthodox Christians in the world by country: More than 75% of population 50–75% of population 20–50% of population 5–20% of population 1–5% of population below 1% of population, but has local autocephaly

Oriental Orthodox Churches are the churches descended from those that rejected the Council of Chalcedon in 451. Despite the similar name, they are therefore a different branch of Christianity from the Eastern Orthodox. Oriental Orthodoxy consists of several autocephalous and autonomous jurisdictions holding a single set of beliefs and united in full communion. However, they each have their own separate rites, and there are significant differences between their respective practices. Thus, there is more internal diversity of practice among the Oriental Orthodox than among the Eastern Orthodox.

== Distribution ==
Oriental Orthodoxy is the dominant religion in Armenia (94%), and Ethiopia (44%, the total Christian population being roughly 67%).

Oriental Orthodoxy is especially the dominant religion in the two Ethiopian regions of Amhara (82%) and Tigray (95%), as well as the chartered city of Addis Ababa (75%). It is also important in Oromia Region (31%).

Oriental Orthodoxy is also one of two dominant religions in Eritrea (47%), especially in its highland regions Maekel Region (87%) and Debub Region (86%).

It is a significant minority religion in Egypt (10-15%-26.1%) , Sudan (1%, the total Christian population being 3%)While some say (3% - 5.4%) Syria (The pre-war figures are 3%, the total Christian population being 10-11%; the rest being Greek Orthodox, Catholic and Church of the East), and Lebanon (5%, the total Christian population being 40%) . In India, Oriental Orthodox Christians are almost entirely concentrated in the state of Kerala. They constitute less than 1% of the overall Indian population. Indian Christians comprised less than 3% of the overall Indian population, while the total Christian population of just Kerala itself is around 18%.

== Predominantly Oriental Orthodox Christian countries ==
Oriental Orthodoxy is the largest single religious faith in:

- Armenia
- Ethiopia
- Eritrea

Countries with a high percentage of Oriental Orthodox Christians include:

- Egypt
- Guatemala
- Sudan
- Syria
- Lebanon
- India
- Iraq

== Oriental Orthodox Churches in full communion ==
- The Coptic Orthodox Church
- The Armenian Apostolic Church
  - The Holy See of Cilicia
  - The Armenian Patriarchate of Constantinople
  - The Armenian Patriarchate of Jerusalem
- The Ethiopian Orthodox Tewahedo Church
- The Eritrean Orthodox Tewahedo Church
- The Syriac Orthodox Church
  - The Jacobite Syrian Christian Church in India
- The Malankara Orthodox Syrian Church

== Statistics ==
Country	Oriental Orthodox population	(%) Oriental Orthodox
Argentina	100,000	0.3%
Armenia	2,796,519	92.60%
Australia	252,300	0.92%
Austria	24,000	0.2%
Bahrain	7,500	0.45%
Belgium	33,000	0.28%
Canada	65,310	0.18%
Cyprus	2,025	0.22%
Djibouti	42,000	3.5%
Egypt	12,000,000-17,000,000	10% - 14%
Eritrea	2,530,000	47%
Ethiopia	47,353,560	43.8%
France	501,840	0.73%
Georgia	109,042	2.9%
Germany	1,140,000	1.5%
Guatemala	600,000	3.9%
Guyana	13,740	1.34%
India	3,700,000	0.26%
Iran	250,000-300,000	0.4%
Iraq	629,340	2%
Israel	38,000 (Note: The Israeli government doesn't release denominational statistics, and classification of Christian minorities is complicated further due to the government's tendency to classify all Christians as Arab. Most Ethiopian-background Israelis are, or descended from, converts to Judaism due to the requirements of Aliyah. In collating unofficial estimates, we arrive at around 38,000 adherents: Around 17,000 Eritrean Tewahedo (many are refugees), 2,000 Ethiopian Tewahedo, 10,000 Armenian Apostolic, 15,000 Syriac Orthodox and 1,000 Coptic Orthodox adherents in Israel.)	0.4%
Jamaica	4,500	0.15%
Jordan	310,656	4.8%
Kazakhstan	21,084	0.1%
Kurdistan	50,000	0.2%
Kuwait	74,000	2.18%
Lebanon	200,000	5%
Libya	60,000	1%
Malta	1,422	0.25%
Netherlands	40,000	0.23%
Norway	12,000	0.22%
Oman	8,200	0.16%
Palestine	118,057	3%
Qatar	7,500	0.27%
Russia	2,151,000	2%
Sudan	500,000	1%
Sweden	69,656	0.7%
Switzerland	16,000	0.18%
Syria	135,000	0.6%
Trinidad and Tobago	11,955	0.79%
Turkey	180,000	0.25%
United Arab Emirates	67,500	0.56%
United Kingdom	100,000	0.15%
United States	492,000	0.15%
Uruguay	16,000	0.45%

== See also ==
- Christianity by country
- Eastern Orthodoxy by country
- Catholicism by Country
- List of Christian denominations by number of members

Other religions:

- Islam by country
- Jews by country
- Hinduism by country
- Buddhism by country
- Irreligion by country

General:

- List of religious populations
