= Protestantism in Honduras =

According to the Latinobarómetro Corporation in The Religions in the Times of the Pope Francisco, 41% of the population in Honduras is Evangelical while 47% is Catholic.

According to the CIA World Factbook, 41% of Hondurans declared themselves as Protestant and 46% as Catholic. A CID-Gallup report in 2007 showed that Protestants comprise 36%.

According to articles published in 2018 by BBC and Periodista Digital, in Honduras and Guatemala there is a sharp decline in the percentage of the population that identifies as Catholic. This is due to rapid increase of Evangelism in the area. Additionally, the percentage of the population that identifies as Evangelical in these two countries practically matches or surpasses the percentage of the population that identifies as Catholic. The article published in the Spanish website, Periodista Digital, states that the percentage of the population that identifies as Catholic in Honduras is only 37%.

== See also ==
- Roman Catholicism in Honduras
