= Religion in Bolivia =

Religion in Bolivia (CIA World Factbook 2023)
1. Catholicism (65.0%)
2. Protestantism (19.6%)
3. Other Christians (0.90%)
4. No religion (8.40%)
5. Other religions (4.80%)
6. Unspecified (1.30%)

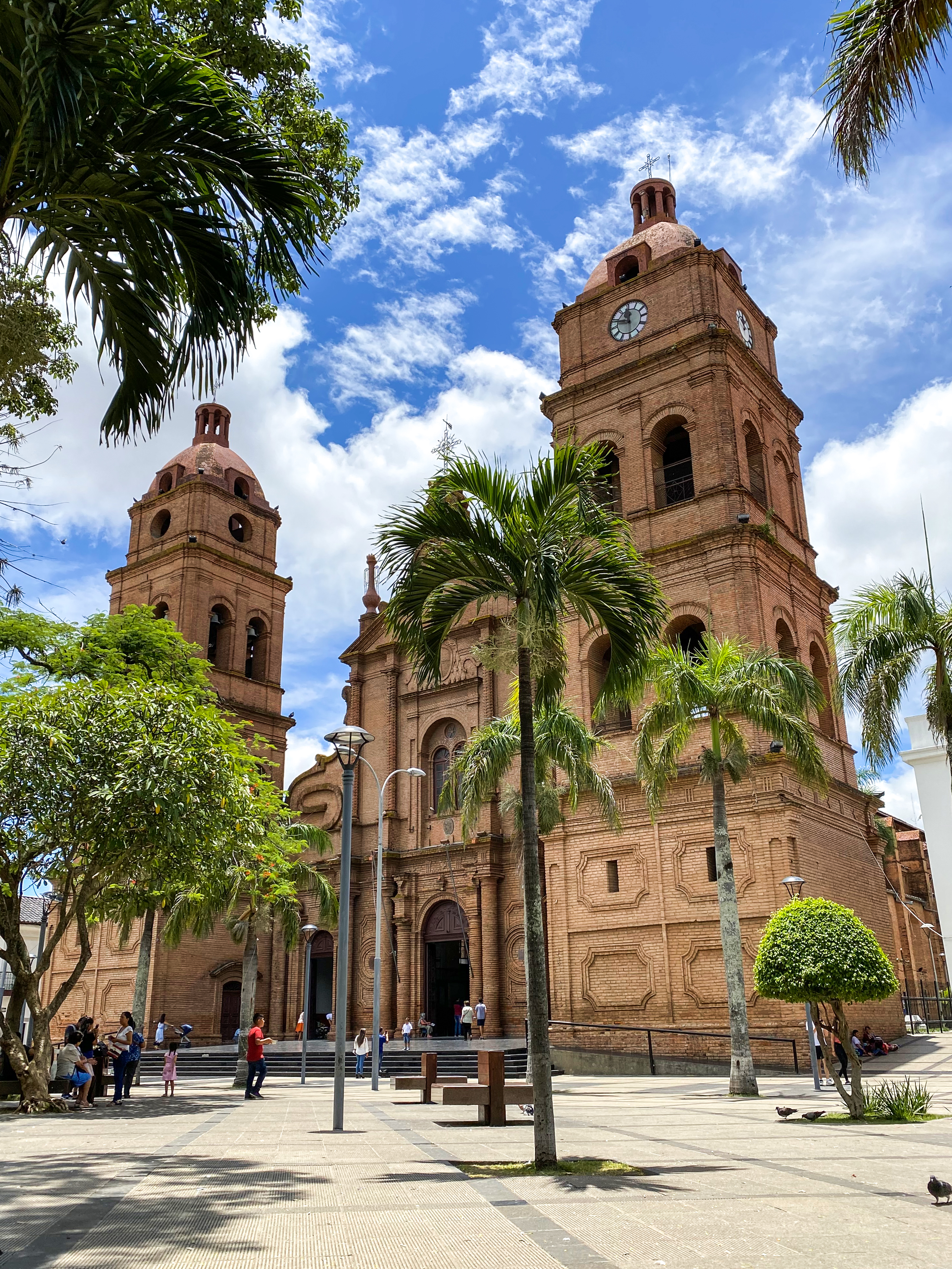
The St. Lawrence's Cathedral in Santa Cruz, Bolivia.

Christianity is the predominant religion in Bolivia, with Catholicism being its largest denomination. Before the arrival of Spanish missionaries, the people residing in the territory of modern day Bolivia practiced a variety of faiths.

Bolivia is a secular nation and its constitution guarantees freedom of religion. In the decades following the Second Vatican Council (1962–65), the Catholic Church has tried to play a more active role in the country's social life.

== Statistics ==
A 2018 survey for Latinobarometro returned these results:

Religion	Percentage of Population	Notes
Catholic	70.0%	36% of Catholics are active
Protestant (census term: Evangelical)	17.2%	Pentecostal, Non-Catholic Charismatic, Lutherans, Methodists, others. 59% of them are active
Non-religious	9.3%	Atheist, None, Agnostic, nothing in particular
Mormon/Jehovah's Witness	1.7%	
Other religion	1.2%	Baháʼí Faith, Jewish, Muslim
No answer	0.6%	

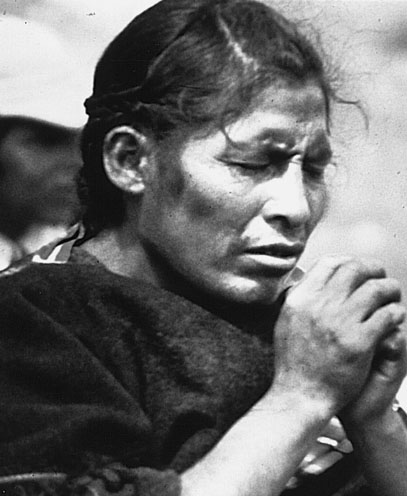
Aymara woman praying

Other reviews of the population vary from these specific results.

== Religious freedom ==
The constitution of Bolivia establishes the freedom of religion and a separation between church and state. The constitution further prohibits discrimination along religious lines.

Religious and spiritual belief organizations are required to register with the Ministry of Foreign Affairs and acquire a national legal personality. Until 2019, when the “law on religious freedom, religious organizations and spiritual beliefs” (LEY Nº 1161) was promulgated, there was an exception for the Catholic Church. Since then, all religions and spiritual beliefs are treated the same, according to law. The same law also establishes a principle of mutual respect, “within the framework of interculturality”.

Public, confessional, and private schools have the option to include religious studies in their curricula. All schools are required to avoid dogmatic imposition and teach ethics courses which emphasize religious tolerance and interreligious dialogue. Confessional schools and universities have a significant presence in all major cities.

Some smaller churches in the evangelical Christian community have refused to register with the government, citing concerns for their privacy. While these groups have been unable to open bank accounts or hold property, the state has not otherwise interfered with their religious practice.

Christian groups have alleged that governments led by Movimiento al Socialismo show a preference toward indigenous religious groups and practices. Conservative and right-wing parties on the other hand tend to privilege Christian beliefs, as evidenced before the accession to power of Jeanine Áñez in 2019 (“The Bible returns to the Government Palace”).

In rural areas of the country, hostility by indigenous communities against Christian missionaries has been reported; in some cases, these incidents have included cases of “indigenous leaders hitting pastors”.

== Christianity ==
=== Catholicism ===
==== Colonial era ====
Christianity had its roots in the Spanish conquest; priests accompanied the first military expeditions. The church's organization, personnel, and role in society were all defined early in the colonial era. Pope Julius III created the La Plata bishopric in 1552; this was followed by those of La Paz and Santa Cruz early in the seventeenth century. A plethora of religious orders – Franciscans, Mercedarians, Dominicans, and Jesuits were the most prominent – joined diocesan priests in the colonial ministry. The clergy were largely of European origin. The few mestizos who joined the ranks were usually admitted as lay brothers rather than priests.

The patronato real (an agreement between the Catholic Church and the Spanish crown) gave the Spanish throne and, by extension, the colonial authorities significant powers in church affairs. Appointments of clergy and bishops normally required the approval of civil authorities. The relationship between church and state was mutual and intimate; each institution had great influence on the other's affairs. In a society where separation from the religious ministrations of the church was unthinkable, the church had great moral influence.

In addition, the colonial church was an extremely wealthy institution. Religious organizations not only owned extensive tracts of land but also served as quasi-official moneylenders to the landed elite and high-ranking officeholders. By the end of the colonial era, a combination of money lending and shrewd real estate investments had made the church the dominant financial power in Bolivia.

==== Independence ====
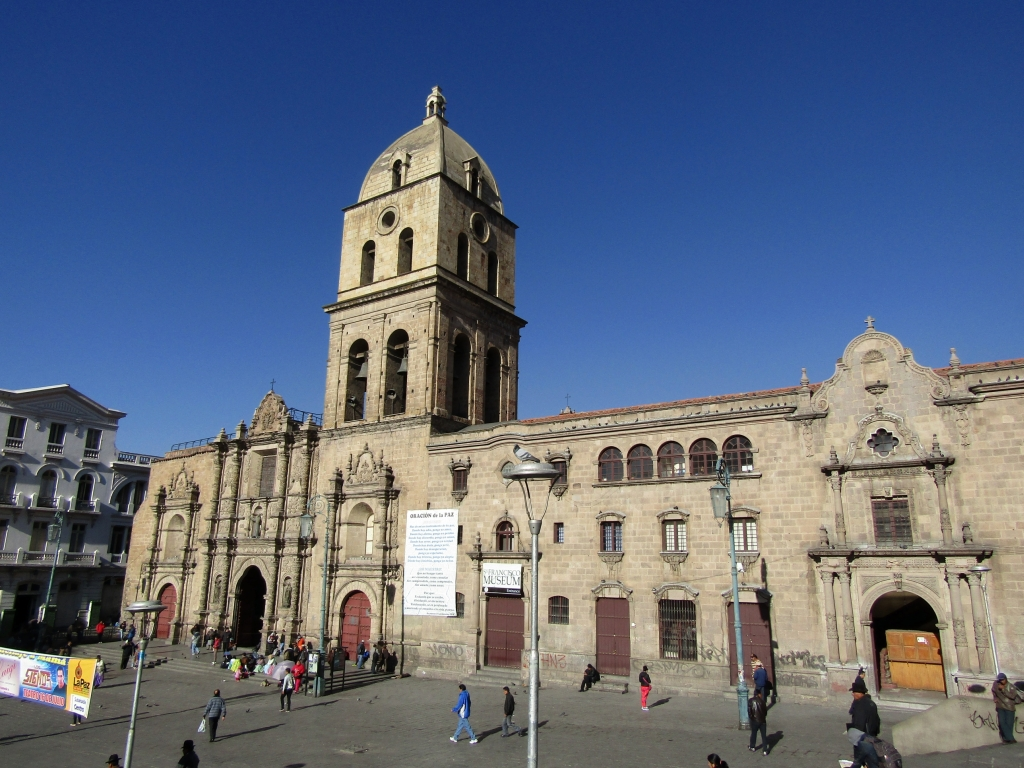
St. Francis Basilica, La Paz, from 1700s

Independence in 1825 brought some changes to Bolivian church-state relations, though the Roman Catholic Church retained its status as the nation's sole religion. Except for a brief period during the 1870s, this pattern continued throughout the nineteenth century. At the same time, however, the new Bolivian government quickly asserted its primacy over the church. In 1826 President Antonio José de Sucre (1825–28) took control over the collection of church tithes, closed all monasteries with fewer than twelve persons, and seized church lands. These actions permanently weakened the church as a political force.

Further changes occurred in the twentieth century. In 1906 the government proclaimed religious toleration and permitted the establishment of non-Roman Catholic churches. In 1961 the government relinquished its right under the patronato nacional (the successor to the patronato real) to mediate in church affairs. No longer could the government have a voice in conciliar decrees, briefs, or bulls that the pope issued or play a role in the selection of high-ranking church officials. The Constitution of 1967 grants official status to the Roman Catholic Church but also guarantees the public exercise of all other religions.

Freed from direct government control, the Roman Catholic Church in the 1960s attempted to establish a more visible presence in Bolivian society. The country's bishops, organized into the Bolivian Bishops Conference (Conferencia Episcopal Boliviana), issued pastoral letters condemning the living conditions of peasants and workers. The bishops established development centers, research organizations, and commissions to address these problems. Many priests, brothers, and sisters took a more direct political stance. The so-called miner priests – oblates assigned to parishes in mining communities – actively defended workers' rights. This experience led to the formation in 1968 of Church and Society in Latin America-Bolivia (Iglesia y Sociedad en América Latina-Bolivia – ISAL-Bolivia). Employing a Marxist analysis of society, ISAL-Bolivia endorsed socialism as the only means of achieving justice.

The political stance of ISAL-Bolivia and others engendered a sharp response from the bishops. Shortly after ISAL-Bolivia contended that capitalism had contaminated the church, the CEB stripped the organization of its official Catholic status. In a subsequent pastoral letter, the bishops stated that although priests had an obligation to promote needed social change, they could not identify with specific political parties or movements. The church hierarchy's caution was evident in its handling of the Bolivian Justice and Peace Commission. Established in 1973 as a research arm of the episcopate, the commission quickly became active in defending the rights of political prisoners of the military government led by Colonel Hugo Banzer Suárez. The government accused the commission of promoting subversive propaganda and deported the organization's key personnel. In their response, the bishops endorsed the commission's human rights agenda but then suspended its operations for two years. The reconstituted commission operated under tighter episcopal controls than did its predecessor.

The return of democracy in the 1980s presented the church with a new set of challenges. Although the CEB recognized that the economic crisis of the early and mid-1980s required strong measures, it publicly questioned the wisdom of the stabilization policies adopted in 1985 by President Víctor Paz Estenssoro. Endorsing the position adopted at the Latin American Bishops Conference in Puebla, Mexico, in 1979, the CEB suggested that Paz Estenssoro's New Economic Policy (Nueva Política Económica – NPE) would generate increasing levels of inequality in society. The bishops followed up this pastoral letter by mediating negotiations in 1986 between the government and the Bolivian Labor Federation (Central Obrera Boliviana).

In 1986 the Roman Catholic Church was organized into four archdioceses (La Paz, Santa Cruz, Cochabamba, and Sucre), four dioceses, two territorial prelatures and six apostolic vicariates. The bishops had at their disposal approximately 750 priests, most of whom were foreigners. The paucity of priests significantly hampered church activities. For example, the archdiocese of Sucre only had sixty-two priests to attend to the needs of an estimated 532,000 Catholics dispersed over 50,000 square kilometers.

Because of the church's weak rural presence, the vast majority of Indians followed their own brand of folk-Catholicism far removed from orthodoxy. Indians saw no inconsistency in mixing professed Roman Catholicism with folk curers or indigenous ritual. Indigenous rituals and fragments of Roman Catholic worship were interwoven in the elaborate fiestas that were the focus of social life.

=== Coptic Orthodox church ===
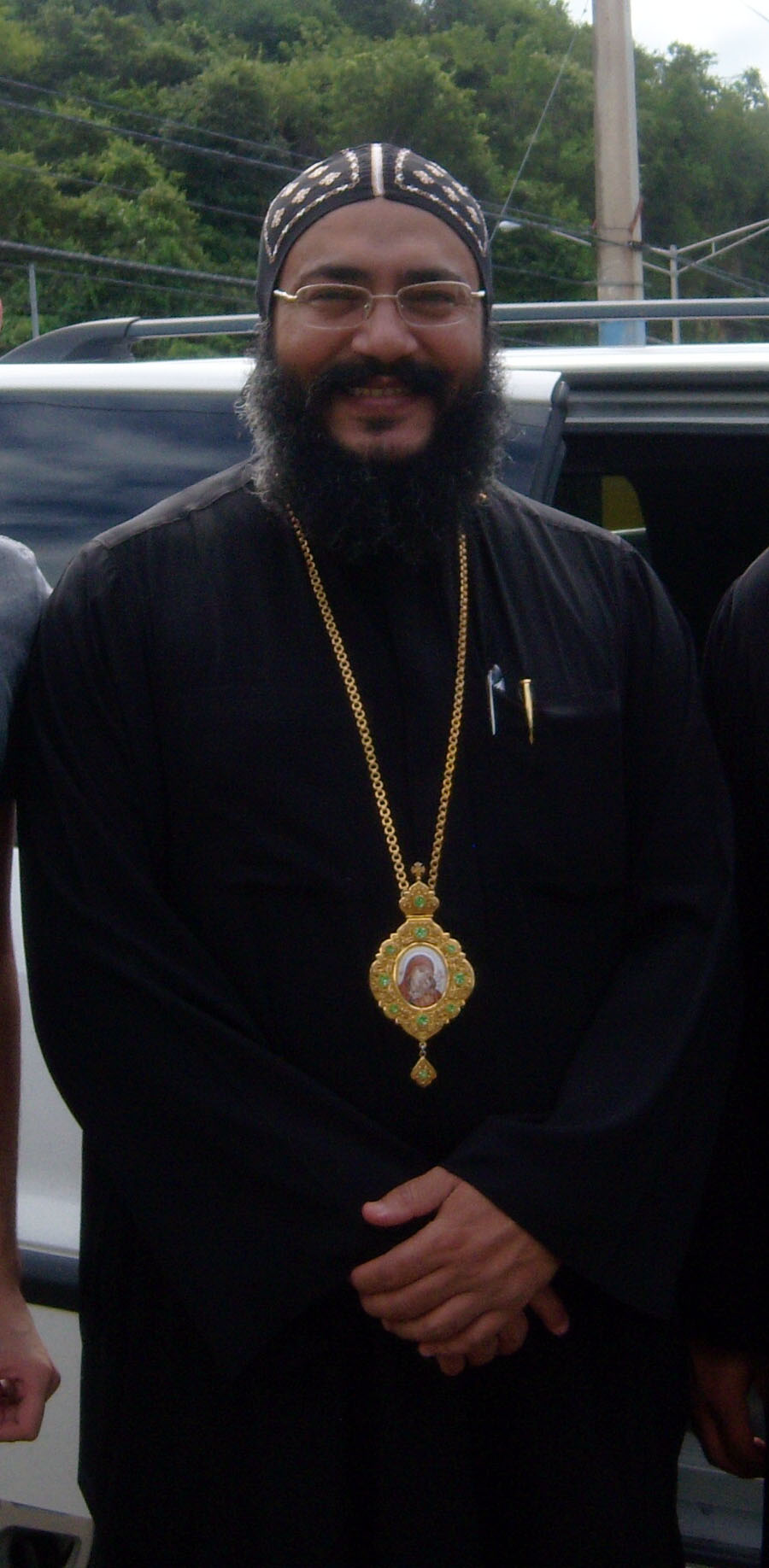
Bishop Youssef of Bolivia

There is a Coptic Orthodox church in Bolivia with Youssef (Joseph) as Bishop of the Holy Diocese of Santa Cruz and all Bolivia.

=== Mormons ===
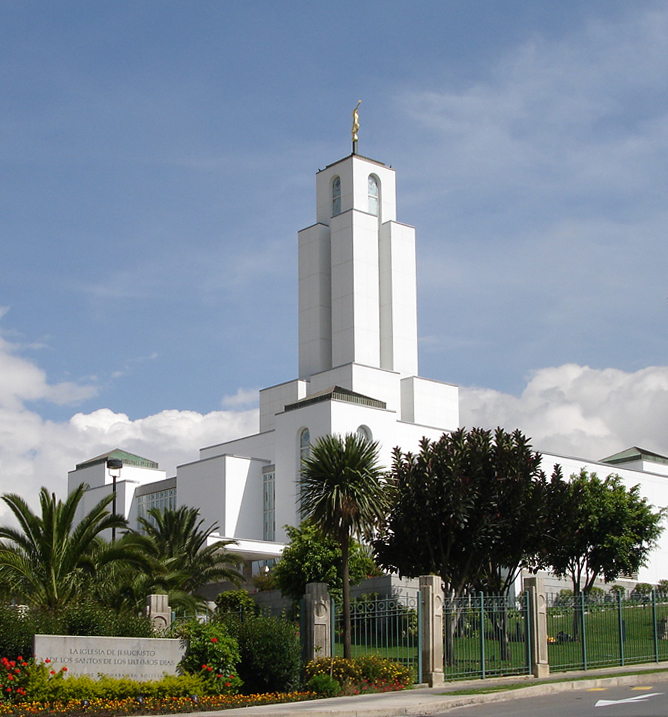
Cochabamba Mormon Temple

The Church of Jesus Christ of Latter-day Saints is also present in Bolivia. In May 1989, left-wing terrorists murdered two Mormon missionaries from the United States who had been working in a squatter community near La Paz.

=== Non-Trinitarians ===
Members of a variety of Pentecostal denominations gained increasing numbers of adherents among the rural and urban squatter populations. Jehovah's Witnesses are also present in Bolivia.

Due to these denominations tending to emphasize individual salvation and to de-emphasize social and political issues, many leftists charged that they were agents of the United States government.

=== Protestantism ===
Bolivia has an active Protestant population made up of various groups since 1934, especially Evangelical Methodists. Other denominations represented in Bolivia include Mennonites; since the early 1950s there are Mennonites in Bolivia, mainly in Santa Cruz Department.

Anglicanism has a small presence in Bolivia, through the Anglican Church of South America (Spanish: Iglesia Anglicana de Sudamérica) the ecclesiastical province of the Anglican Communion that covers six dioceses in the countries of Argentina, Bolivia, Paraguay, Peru, and Uruguay.

Bolivia is home to the largest number of Religious Society of Friends (Quakers) in South America. As of 2017, there were 28,500 Quakers in Bolivia within 6 Yearly Meetings (associations).

=== Religious syncretism among indigenous groups ===
The Quechua and Aymara pantheon was a mix of Christian and pre-conquest spirits and beings. A deity like the virginal daughter of the Inca sun god was transmuted into the Virgin Mary. Many of the supernaturals were linked to a specific place, such as lake and mountain spirits. The earth mother, Pachamama, and fertility rituals played a prominent role.

== Other religions ==
=== Baháʼí Faith ===
The Baháʼí Faith in Bolivia begins with references to the country in Baháʼí literature as early as 1916. The first Baháʼí to arrive in Bolivia was in 1940 through the arrival of coordinated pioneers, people who chose to move for the growth of the religion, from the United States. That same year the first Bolivian joined the religion. The first Baháʼí Local Spiritual Assembly, the local administrative unit of the religion, was elected in La Paz in 1945. Since 1956 indigenous people have joined the religion, and it has spread widely among them. The community elected an independent National Spiritual Assembly in 1961. By 1963 there were hundreds of local assemblies. The Baháʼí Faith is currently the largest international religious minority in Bolivia and the largest population of Baháʼís in South America with a population estimated at 217,000 in 2005, according to the Association of Religion Data Archives.

=== Islam ===
Islam was brought by immigrants from Middle Eastern countries such as Palestine, Iran, Syria and Lebanon. Palestinian immigrants visited the country for the first time in 1970 and built the first Muslim community site called Centro Islámico Boliviano and located in Santa Cruz de la Sierra in 1986. The community was founded by Mahmud Amer Abusharar who spread Islam in Bolivia since 1974.

The famous mosque in Bolivia is the Mezquita Yebel An-Nur which is located in La Paz and was founded in 2004. This mosque is the first recognized Sunni mosque in Bolivia. This mosque was founded in collaboration with Bolivian Muslims with local residents who often visit their homes.

According to the 2010 census by Pew, there are 2,000 Muslims in Bolivia (representing 0.01% from total population), compared to 1,000 Muslims in 1990.

=== Judaism ===
The Jewish population is about 500 members, making it one of the smallest Jewish communities in South America.

== No religion ==
A 2007 Gallup poll asking "Is religion important in your life?" showed 12% of respondents answering "No". The 2008 survey done by the Americas Barometer had 3.3% of participants indicating "no religion". A later survey, from February 2010, published in the newspaper La Prensa, but performed only in the capitals of El Alto, La Paz, Cochabamba and Santa Cruz, showed 5% of respondents professing to have no religion.
