= Religion in Andorra =

Overview of religion in Andorra

Religion in Andorra (2020 estimate)
1. Catholicism (85.5%)
2. Other Christian (5.30%)
3. None (6.90%)
4. Other (2.30%)

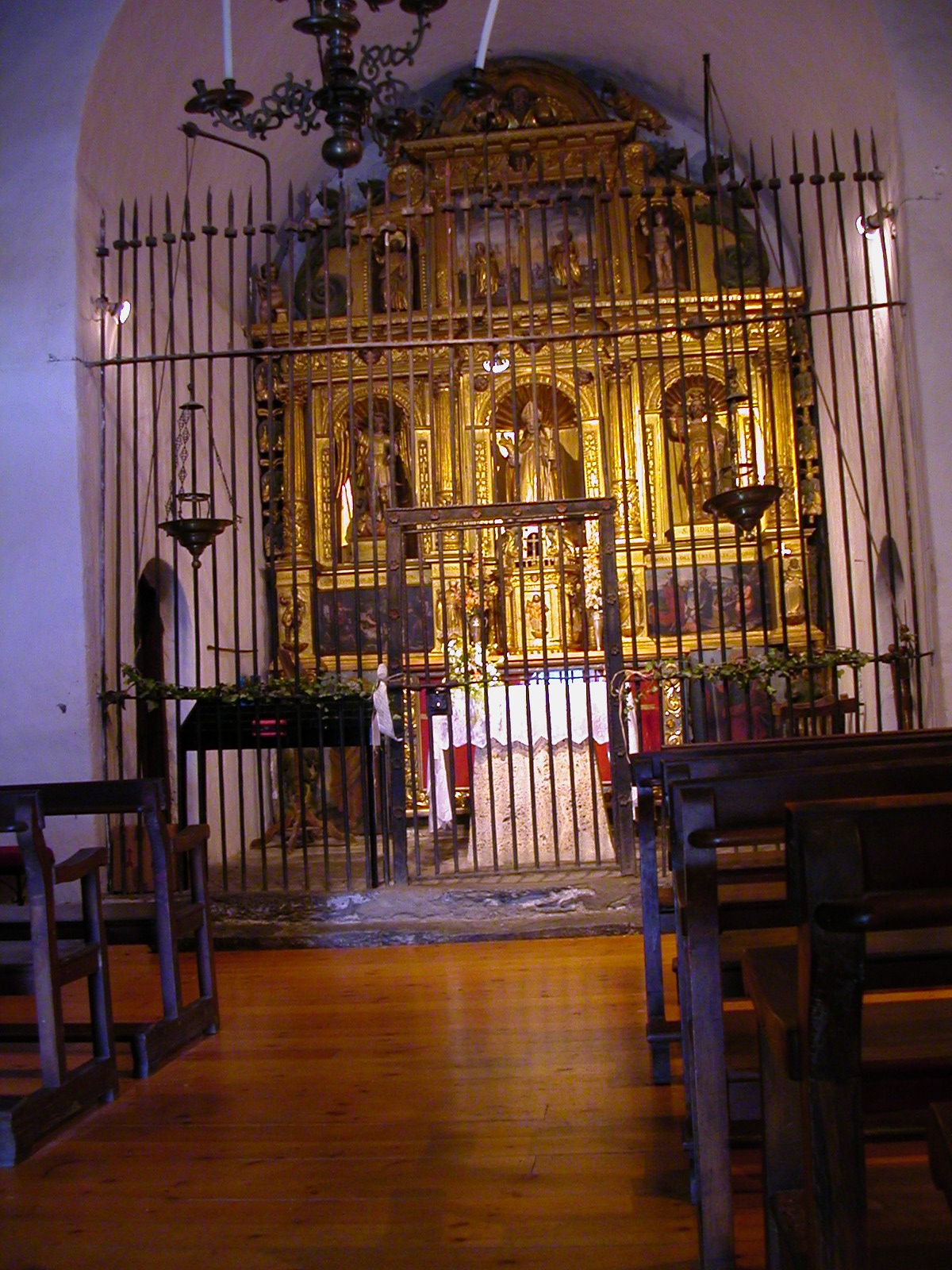
St. Martin's Cathedral in Ordino

Christianity is the largest religion in Andorra, with more than 90 per cent of the population as adherents. Catholicism is the largest Christian denomination in the country, having more than 85 per cent of the Andorran population as members.

Andorra is also home to sizeable communities of non-religious people (nearly 7 per cent) and adherents of other faiths. Among these are: Sunni Islam, with 1.32 per cent of the population; Hinduism is followed by 0.49 per cent, Judaism by 0.34 per cent, and the Baháʼí Faith by 0.16 per cent.

The Constitution of Andorra guarantees freedom of individual religious belief and expression. Only Catholicism has the legal status of a religious group; all other faiths are registered with the government as cultural associations, operating under Andorra's association law. The country has non-discrimination laws which prohibit and penalise unequal or unfair treatment including of members of religious groups. In 2022, the country banned wearing such religious symbols as Islamic headscarves and Jewish kippahs. Despite petitions by Muslims and Jews, no public land has been provided for cemeteries. In 2024, the president of the Jewish community said that they were negotiating with the government for a cemetery by 2026.

Andorra does not allow mosques, synagogues, or other houses of worship besides Catholicism. As a result, Jewish worship is conducted in a discrete location, not an explicit synagogue, "in a large meeting hall tucked away on an underground level of a medical office building that used to be a warehouse." It does not have any outside indications of its function and does not have a mezuzah. The nearest synagogue is in Barcelona. By 2024, only 2 Jews reported kept kosher. There is no mikvah, ritual bath, no mohel for ritual circumcisions, and the only rabbis visit from France.

In 2010 the Pew Research Center estimated that 88.2% of the population was Catholic, 0.3% Protestant, 0.3% Orthodox and 0.7% was Other Christian.

According to a 2018 survey by World Values Survey, 66.7% of the population was Christian, with 64.0% Catholic, 1.0% Protestant and 1.7% Orthodox. 30.1% declared themselves Non-religious, 1.1% Muslim and the remaining part were followers of other religions.

== See also ==
- Hinduism in Andorra
- History of the Jews in Andorra
- Islam in Andorra
