= Protestantism in Bolivia =

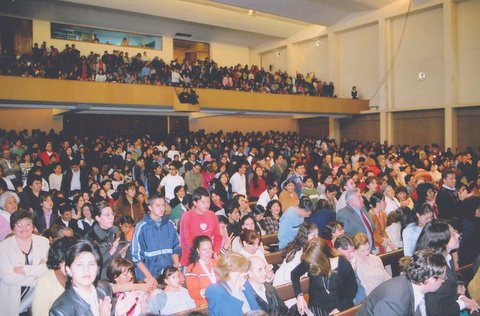
A Pentecostal church in La Paz

Bolivia has an active Protestant minority of various groups, especially Evangelical Methodists. Other denominations represented in Bolivia included Mennonites. Since the 1970s, various Pentecostal, Baptist and Seventh-day Adventist denominations gained increasing adherents.

In 2015 there were 1,4 million Protestants in Bolivia, representing 13.7% of the population. The largest denominations within Protestantism were Pentecostals (7.9%), other evangelical communities (approx. 3%), and Seventh-day Adventists (2.2%).

In 2018 there were 17.2% Protestants in Bolivia, according to Latinobarometro. According to estimates, around the year 2025 Protestant groups in Bolivia account for somewhere between 16-19% of the population, with most of the demographic concentration being within the poorer Native population, whereas Mennonites are overwhelmingly German speaking ethnic Mennonites, see also Mennonites in Bolivia.

== History ==
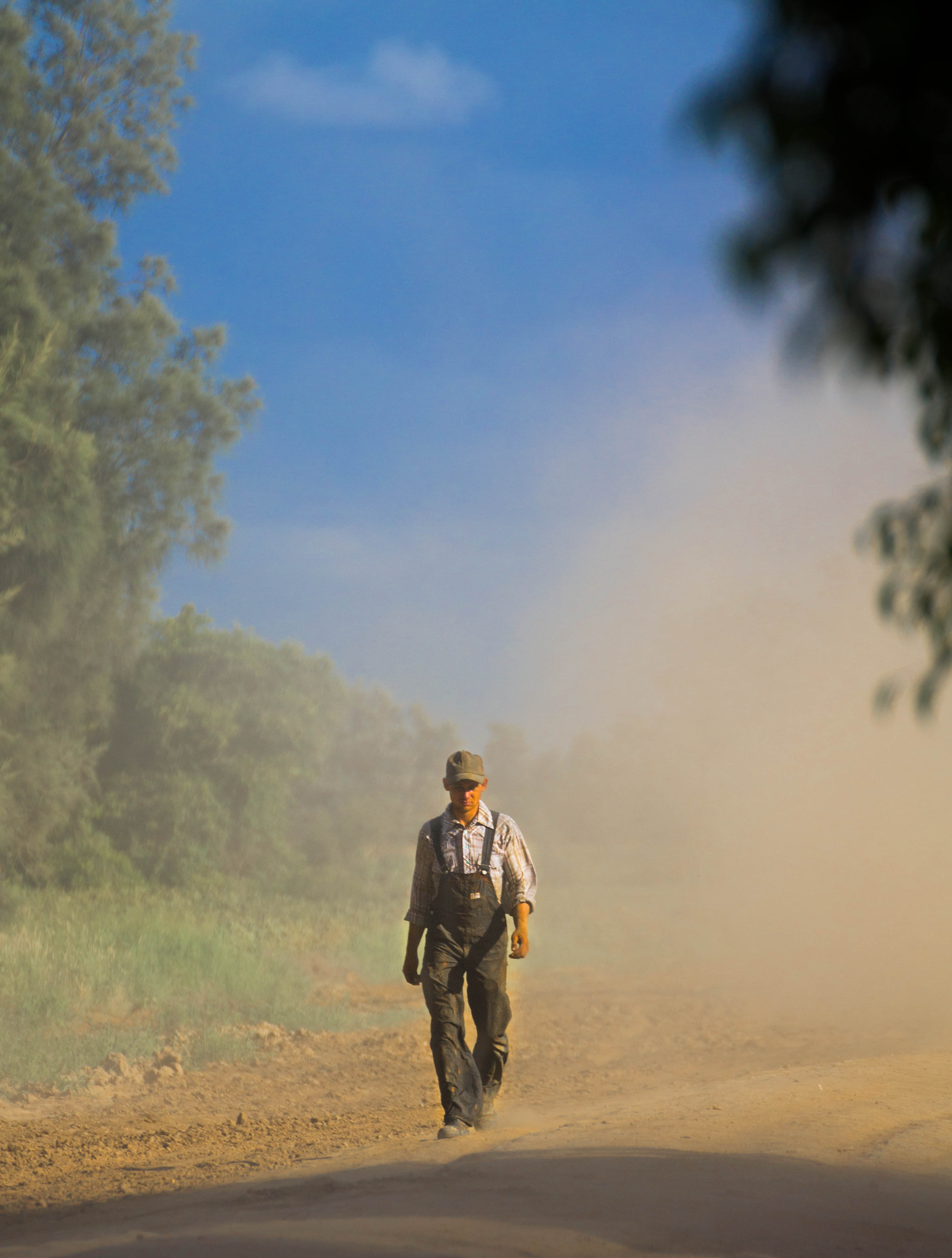
Mennonite man in traditional clothing in Colonia del Norte.

- In 1895 (significantly later than in other Latin American countries), the Plymouth Brethrenarrieved as the first Protestant missionaries.
- In 1898, Canadian Baptists began their missionary work, followed by Methodists in 1901, and Seventh-day Adventists in 1907.
- In 1902, George Allan arrived and began a mission among the Quechua Indians and in 1907, he founded the Bolivian Indian Mission (BIM).
- In 1920, the first Pentecostal missionaries arrived (the Swedish Free Mission).
- In 1929, the American mission of the Fourfold Gospel Church arrived, followed by the Evangelical Pentecostal Church (from Chile) in 1938, and in 1946, the American Assemblies of God began their work.
- In 1923, with the help of Bolivians, George Allan translated and published the New Testament into Quechua. During this period, he also founded Bible schools.
- In 1959, two Protestant missions merged to form the Christian Evangelical Union (UCE), which is currently the third largest Protestant church in Bolivia.[4]
