= Religion in Transnistria =

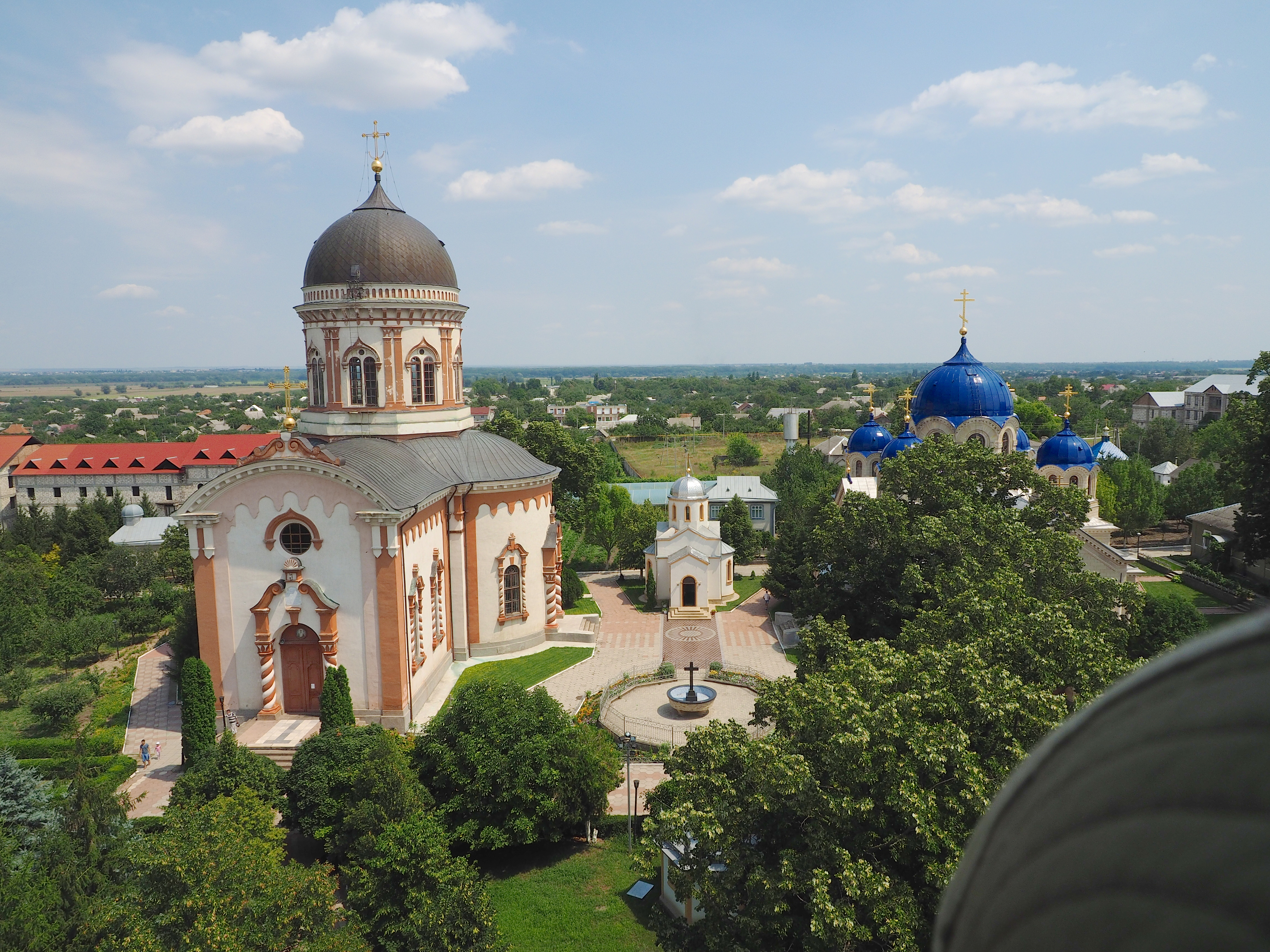
Noul Neamț Monastery

Official statistics of the self-proclaimed Pridnestrovian Moldavian Republic, commonly known in English as Transnistria, show that 91 percent of the Transnistrian population adhere to Eastern Orthodox Christianity, with 4 percent belonging to the Catholic Church. Roman Catholics are mainly located in northern Transnistria, a region with a notable Polish minority.

Transnistria's government has supported the restoration and construction of new Orthodox churches. It affirms that the republic has freedom of religion and states that 114 religious beliefs and congregations are officially registered.

== Eastern Orthodox Christianity ==
Eastern Orthodoxy is the dominant religion in Transnistria.

=== Russian Orthodox Church ===
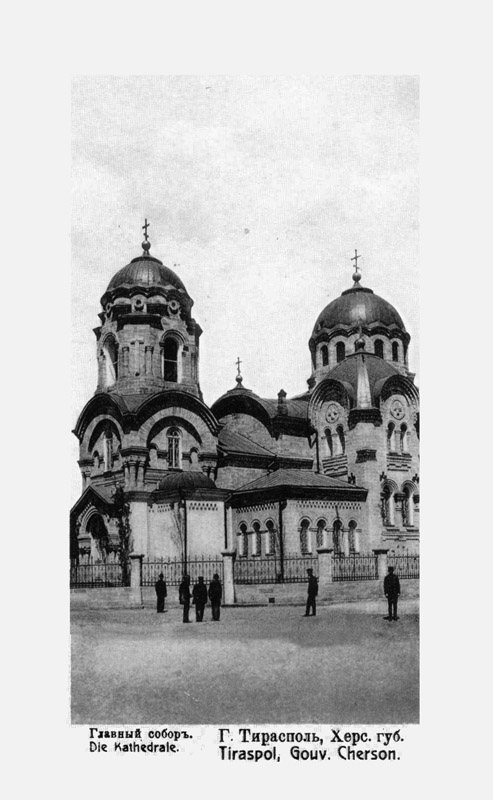
The Saint Nicholas Cathedral in Tiraspol (pictured in 1910) was built in the early 19th century. It was the main orthodox church of Tiraspol until its demolishion in the mid-1930s, by the Soviet authorities.

Most Orthodox Transnistrians are under the jurisdiction of the Diocese of Tiraspol and Dubăsari of the Russian Orthodox Church's Metropolis of Chișinău and All Moldova. Since 5 March 2010, the ruling bishop has been Sabbas Volkov, Archbishop of Tiraspol and Dubăsari. The diocese includes seven deaneries; Tiraspol, Bender, Slobozia, Grigoriopol, Dubăsari, Rîbnița, and Camenca. The cathedrals are located in Tiraspol and Dubăsari.

=== Romanian Orthodox Church ===
The Romanian Orthodox Church is represented in Transnistria by the Diocese of Dubăsari and Transnistria, a suffragan of the Metropolis of Bessarabia considered a continuation of the former Romanian Orthodox Mission in Transnistria. It is based in the city of Dubăsari, however it is vacant.

=== Old Believers ===
The territory of Transnistria is under the Diocese of Chișinău and All Moldova of the Russian Orthodox Old Believer Church. As of 2016, there are three Old Believer churches in Transnistria; the Church of the Intercession of the Most Holy Theotokos in Tiraspol, the Church of the Great Martyr George the Victorious in the village of Bîcioc, and the Church of the Intercession of the Most Holy Theotokos in Bender.

== Catholic Christianity ==
In Rașcov, there is a rectory and a historic heritage church in operation named after Saint Cajetan. In Rîbnița, a church named after Saint Joseph is being built. There are no religious buildings in Tiraspol and Bender, although the issue of their construction is being considered. Currently, the rites are held in the parish chapel of Tiraspol. Transnistrian parishes are headed by Anton Coșa, the Bishop of the Roman Catholic Church in Moldova.

== Protestant Christianity ==
Protestantism is represented in Tiraspol by the Church of Christ the Savior and the Seventh-Day Adventist churches of Maranafa and Emmanuel.

== Islam ==
Today Islam is one of the smallest religions in Transnistria, with the majority of the population being Orthodox or atheist, but until the beginning of the 20th century it was professed by a significant number. It was centered in the city of Bender, the former center of Ottoman power in the region.

The history of the spread of Islam in the region began after the Turkish Sultan Suleiman the Magnificent defeated the Principality of Moldavia in August 1538. The mixed Romanian–Slavic population on the left bank of the Dniester was left open to the wild steppes from the east and was defeated. After fierce battles, the Turks occupied the entire territory of Moldavia, turning it into an Ottoman vassal. The city of Tighina, as well as the 18 villages adjacent to it, were turned into a Turkish raya called Bender. On the site of the former citadel, the famous Ottoman architect Mimar Sinan designed a more advanced fortification called the Bender Fortress. Budjak Tatars settled behind its walls, forming the basis of local Muslims for more than 200 subsequent years.

In 1789, during the Russo-Turkish war, Prince Potemkin allowed the entire Muslim population of the besieged city to leave it with the possibility of selling houses, property and livestock. Most Muslims went to Dobruja, becoming muhacirs. On the map compiled in the same year, four mosques can be seen located on the territory of the fortress. Bender itself was finally ceded de facto to the Russian Empire only in November 1806, and de jure not until 1812.

== Judaism ==
There are 4 synagogues in Transnistria, being in Tiraspol, Bender, Dubăsari and Rîbnița. There are no rabbis in Transnistria, so religious rites are performed by Jewish hazzans who live in the controlled territory of the Republic of Moldova. Transnistrian Jews are united in the Association of Jewish Communities.
