= Eastern Orthodoxy by country =

Based on the numbers of adherents, the Eastern Orthodox Church (also known as Eastern Orthodoxy) is the second largest Christian communion in the world, after the Roman Catholic Church, with the most common estimates of adherents being around 220 million.

Eastern Orthodox Church is the third-largest religious community in the world, after Sunni Islam and the Catholic Church.

== Overview ==
As of 2024, Eastern Orthodoxy was the predominant religion in Russia (62%), where roughly half the world's Eastern Orthodox Christians live. It is heavily concentrated in the rest of Eastern Europe, where it is the majority religion in Ukraine (65%–77%), Romania (73%), Greece (90%), Belarus (60%), Serbia (81%), Bulgaria (62%), Moldova (94%), Georgia (82%), North Macedonia (46%), Cyprus (74%) and Montenegro (71%).

Significant Orthodox minorities were present in several European countries: Bosnia and Herzegovina (31%), Latvia (18%), Estonia (14%), Albania (7%), Lithuania (4%), Croatia (4%), Slovenia (2%), and Finland (1.5%). In the post-Soviet states of Central Asia, Eastern Orthodoxy constitutes significant minority in Kazakhstan (17%), Turkmenistan (6%), Kyrgyzstan (3%), Uzbekistan (2%), and Azerbaijan (2%). In the Levant, the most significant Eastern Orthodox populations are in Lebanon (8%), Syria (5–8% prior to the 2011 civil war) in Palestine (0.5%–2.5%) and Jordan (over 1%).

The percentage of Christians in Turkey, home to an historically large and influential Eastern Orthodox community, fell from 19% in 1914 to 2.5% in 1927, due to genocide, demographic upheavals caused by the population exchange between Greece and Turkey, and the emigration of Christians to foreign countries (mostly in Europe and the Americas). In 2022, there was a large increase in the number of Eastern Orthodox Christians in Turkey to over 150,000 people; this included approximately 100,000 people escaping the Russian invasion of Ukraine.

In 2021 and 2022, the Russian Orthodox Church opened more than 200 parishes throughout the continent of Africa, and had plans to build a cathedral in Johannesburg.

Recent immigration and missionary activity have raised the numbers of Eastern Orthodox adherents in traditionally Catholic and Protestant countries, including Australia, Austria, Germany, Italy, Spain, Canada and Switzerland, where they comprise roughly 2% of the population in each.

== Eastern Orthodox population by country ==
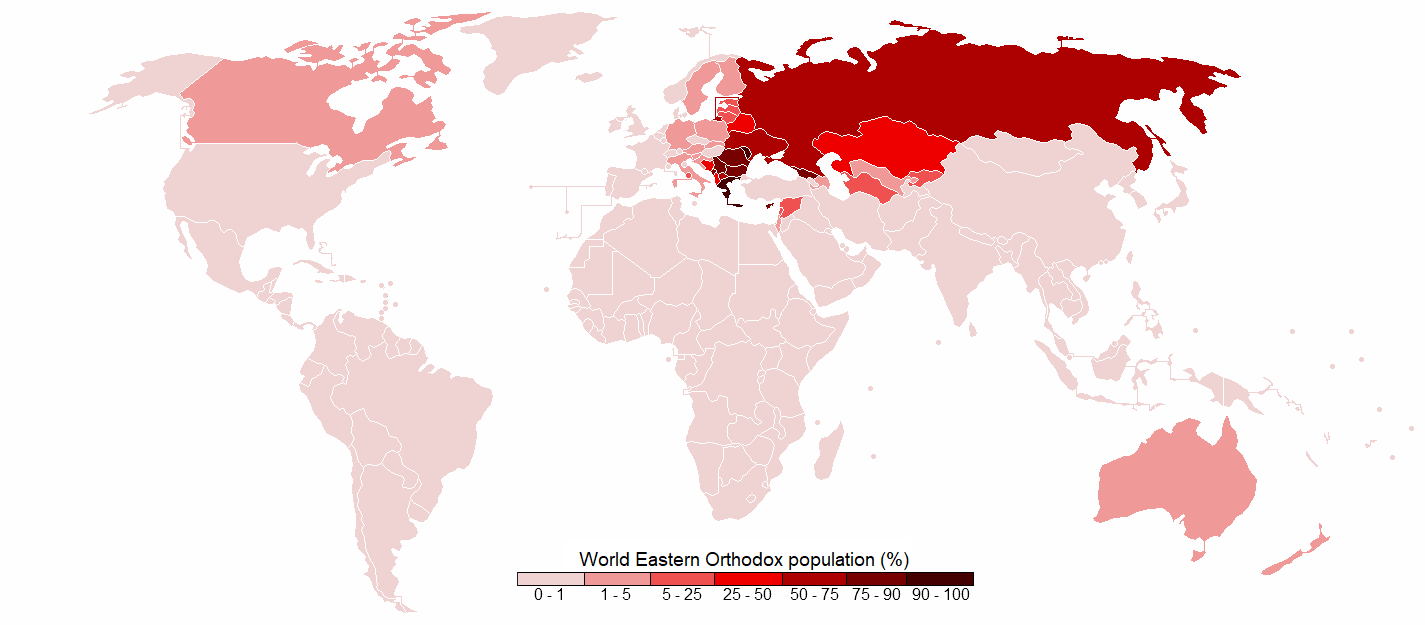
Eastern Orthodox population by country

There is no universal agreement on the number of members of the Eastern Orthodox Church in each country. Each study performed that seeks to discover the number of adherents in a country may use different criteria, and be submitted to different populations. As such, some numbers may be inflated, and therefore inaccurate. Examples of this are Greece and Russia, where estimates of adherence to Eastern Orthodoxy may reach 80–98%, but where surveys found lower percentages professing Eastern Orthodoxy or belief in God. The likely reason for this disparity is that many people in majority Eastern Orthodox countries will culturally identify with the Eastern Orthodox Church, especially if they were baptized as children, even if they are not currently practicing. This includes those who may be irreligious, yet culturally identify with the Eastern Orthodox Church, or for whom Eastern Orthodox Christianity is listed on official state records. Other cases of incongruent data also might be due to counting ethnic groups from Eastern Orthodox countries rather than actual adherents. For example, the Eastern Orthodox jurisdictions in the United States, which has large numbers of immigrants from Eastern Orthodox countries, have collectively reported a total of 2–3 million across the country.

However, a 2010 study by Alexei Krindatch sought data from each parish, with the specific criteria of annual participation, discovering that there were only about 817,000 Eastern Orthodox Christians actively practicing their faith (i.e., attending church services on a regular basis) in the United States. The study explained that such a difference was due to a variety of circumstances, for example the higher numbers having counted all people who self-identify as Eastern Orthodox on a census regardless of active participation, or all people belonging to ethnic groups originating in Eastern Orthodox countries. This study, while initially controversial, proved groundbreaking, and has since been officially approved for use by the Assembly of Canonical Orthodox Bishops of the United States of America.

Country	Total population	% Eastern Orthodox	Eastern Orthodox total
Albania (details)	2,621,977	7.2%	173,645
Armenia (details)	3,018,854	0.2%	7,587
Australia (details)	23,824,600	2.6%	563,100
Austria (details)	8,773,000	6%	500,000
Azerbaijan (details)	9,624,900	2.5%	240,000
Belarus (details)	9,349,645	60.1%	5,619,106
Bosnia and Herzegovina (details)	3,531,159	30.7%	1,089,658
Brazil (details)	210,147,125	0.06%	135,000
Bulgaria (details)	6,519,789	62.7%	4,091,780
Canada (details)	36,991,981	1.7%	623,005
China (details)	1,386,000,000	0.001%	15,000
Croatia (details)	3,871,833	3.3%	129,820
Cyprus (details)	923,281	74.5%	688,075
Czech Republic (details)	10,538,275	0.2%	20,533
Egypt (details)	105,000,000	0.3%	350,000
Estonia (details)	1,114,030	16.3%	181,770
France (details)	67,150,000	1%	500,000–700,000
Fiji (details)	912,241	0.02%	200+
Finland (details)	5,477,359	1.1%	70,000
Georgia (details)	3,929,581	82%	3,223,206
Germany (details)	79,652,360	1.3%	1,050,740
Greece (details)	10,423,054	90%	9,380,749
Grenada (details)	107,317	0.1%	100
Guatemala (details)	17,263,239	3%	200,000–550,000
Israel (details)	9,010,050	0.6%	100,000
Italy (details)	60,795,612	3%	1,800,000
Japan (details)	126,226,568	0.02%	20,000
Jordan (details)	9,531,712	2–4.5%	150,000–350,000
Kazakhstan (details)	19,186,015	17.1%	3,269,143
Korea, South (details)	51,413,925	0.01%	6,000
Kosovo (details)	1,585,566	5%	95,000
Kyrgyzstan (details)	6,636,800	2.8%	185,000
Latvia (details)	1,842,226	14%	258,000
Lebanon (details)	4,525,247	9%	330,000
Lithuania (details)	2,966,954	4.2%	125,189
Madagascar (details)	26,262,313	0.06%	15,000
Mexico (details)	121,736,809	0.01%	15,000
Moldova (details)	2,409,207	94.3%	2,271,205
Montenegro (details)	623,633	71.1%	443,394
New Zealand (details)	4,599,327	0.3%	13,883
North Macedonia (details)	1,836,713	46.1%	847,390
Norway (details)	5,328,212	0.4%	21,993
Palestine (details)	4,550,368	2.5%	100,000
Philippines	109,035,343	0.002%	2,500
Poland (details)	38,386,000	1.4%	504,400
Romania (details)	19,053,815	73.4%	14,044,790
Russia (details)	145,500,000	61.8%–72%	101,450,000–104,000,000
Serbia (details)	6,647,003	81.1%	5,387,426
Slovakia (details)	5,397,036	0.9%	49,133
Slovenia (details)	2,055,496	2.2%	45,000
Spain (details)	46,464,053	3.1%	1,500,000
Sweden (details)	9,775,572	1.5%	145,279
Switzerland (details)	8,211,700	1.7%	140,000
Syria (details)	22,457,336	3.1%	700,000
Tajikistan (details)	8,208,000	0.5%	45,000
Transnistria (details)	505,153	91%	460,000
Turkey (details)	84,277,439	0.02%	16,000
Turkmenistan (details)	7,057,841	6.4%	450,000
Ukraine (details)	40,000,000	65.4–76.6%	27,802,000–34,850,000
United States (details)	341,784,857	1%	2,600,000
United Kingdom (details)	67,886,011	0.7%	475,000
Uzbekistan (details)	39,047,321	2.1%	822,000
TOTAL	3,331,625,296	4%	~220,000,000

^{a} Unreliable census data.

== Eastern Orthodox Church by jurisdiction ==
=== Autocephalous Eastern Orthodox Churches ===
The Eastern Orthodox Church is organized as a union of several autocephalous subdivisions, which are also called "Churches" (or, sometimes, "jurisdictions"). Some are associated with a specific country, while others are not. This table presents some known data regarding individual jurisdictions. "NA" means that data is not available.

Eastern Orthodox Church by jurisdiction
Jurisdiction	Bishops	Priests	Monastics	Monasteries	Parishes
Constantinople	125	NA	1,800 (Note: Including Mount Athos)	142	648
Alexandria	41	NA	NA	NA	NA
Antioch	36	NA	NA	NA	NA
Jerusalem	20	NA	NA	NA	NA
Russia	217	30,675	NA	807	30,142
Serbia	47	2,863	1,461	204	3,100
Romania	53	15,068	7,605	359	15,717
Bulgaria	15	1,500	NA	120	2,600
Georgia	37	730	NA	NA	600
Cyprus	16	NA	NA	67	NA
Greece	101	10,000	3,541	646	9,146
Poland	12	NA	NA	NA	400
Albania	6	135	NA	150	909
Czech Lands & Slovakia	6	NA	NA	NA	172
Orthodox Church in America	50	2700	NA	100	1200
Ukraine	62	4,500	NA	71	7,000
North Macedonia	NA	NA	NA	NA	NA
Total	743	54,382	12,946	2,256	61,939
