= Religion in the Czech Republic =

Religion in the Czech Republic (2021 census)
1. No religion (47.8%)
2. Catholicism (9.30%)
3. Other Christians (2.40%)
4. Believers without religion (9.60%)
5. Other religions (1.20%)
6. Undeclared (30.1%)

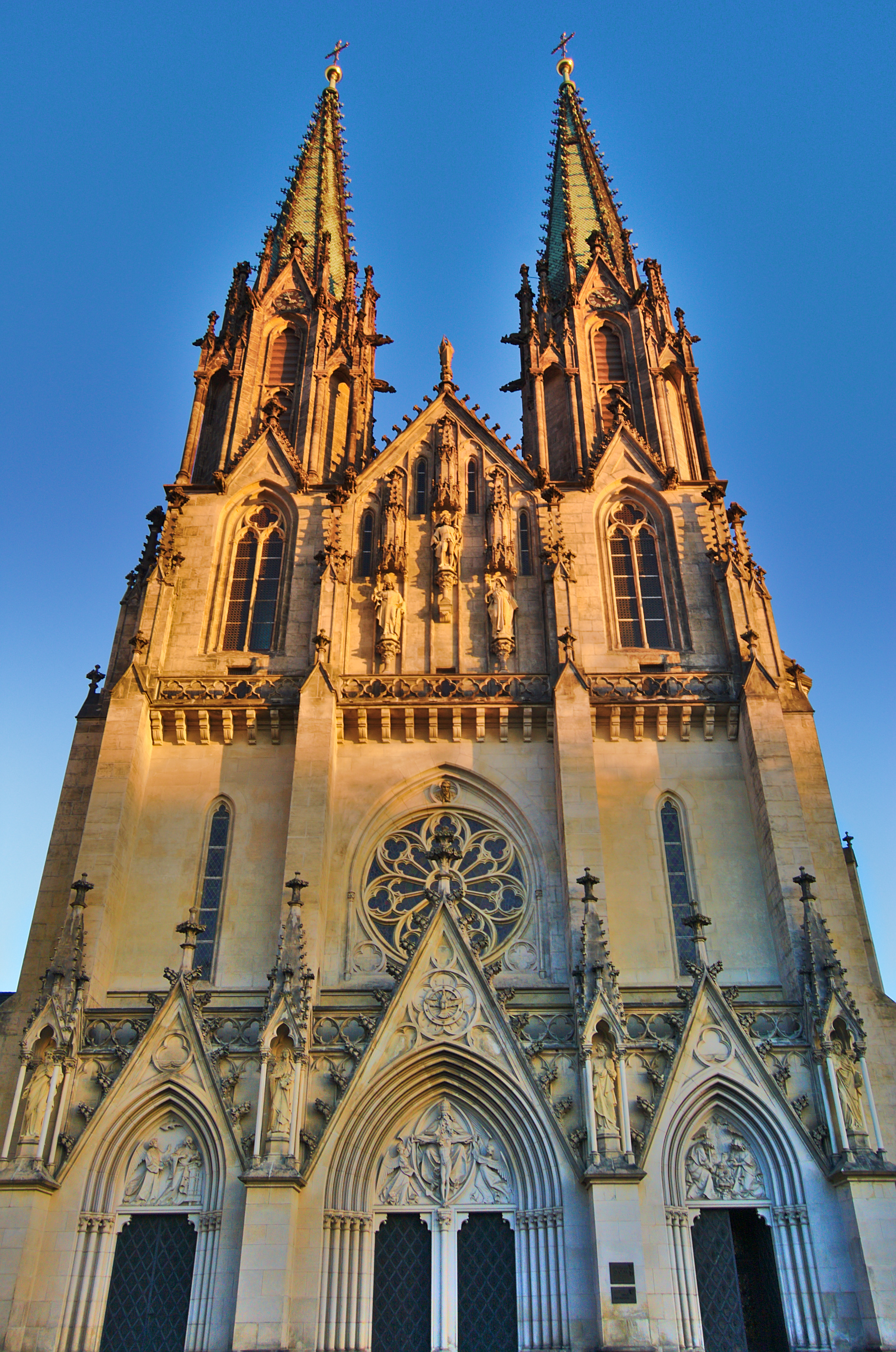
Cathedral of Saint Wenceslaus in Olomouc

In the Czech Republic, 47.8% of the population is irreligious (atheist, agnostic or other irreligious life stances), while 21.3% of the population are believers. The religious identity of the country has changed drastically since the first half of the 20th century, when more than 90% of Czechs were Christians. As of 2021, 11.7% of the population identified with Christianity (9.3% identifying with Catholicism and 2.4% with all other Christian denominations); 10.8% identified with other religious identities or beliefs. According to research dating back to the year 2002 and according to sociologist Jan Spousta, not all the irreligious people are atheists; indeed, since the late 20th century there has been an increasing distancing from both Christian dogmatism and atheism, and at the same time ideas and non-institutional models similar to those of Eastern religions have become widespread through movements started by various gurus, and hermetic and mystical paths.

The Christianisation of the Czechs (Bohemians, Moravians and Silesians) occurred in the 9th and 10th centuries, when they were incorporated into the Catholic Church and abandoned indigenous Slavic paganism. After the Bohemian Reformation which began in the late 14th century, most Czechs became Hussites, that is to say followers of Jan Hus, Petr Chelčický and other regional Proto-Protestant religious reformers. Taborites and Utraquists were the two major Hussite factions. During the Hussite Wars in the early 15th century, the Utraquists sided with the Catholic Church, and following the joint Utraquist—Catholic victory, Utraquism was accepted by the Catholic Church as a legitimate doctrine to be practised in the Kingdom of Bohemia, while all the other Hussite movements were prohibited. Jewish minorities were also present in the country.

After the Protestant Reformation in the 16th century, some in Bohemia, especially Sudeten Germans, went with the teachings of Martin Luther (Lutheranism). In the wake of the Reformation, Utraquist Hussites took a renewed increasingly anti-Catholic stance while some of the defeated Hussite factions (notably the Taborites) were revived. The defeat of Bohemian estates by the Habsburg monarchy in the Battle of White Mountain in 1620 affected the religious sentiments of the Czechs, as the Habsburgs endorsed a Counter-Reformation to forcibly reconvert all Czechs, even Utraquist Hussites, back to the Catholic Church.

Since the Battle of White Mountain, widespread anti-Catholic sentiment and resistance to the Catholic Church underlay the history of the Czech lands even when the whole population nominally belonged to the Catholic Church, and the Czechs have been historically characterised as "tolerant and even indifferent towards religion". At the end of the 18th century, Protestant and Jewish minorities were once again granted some rights, but they had to wait another century to have full equality. In 1918 the Habsburg monarchy collapsed, and in the newly independent Czechoslovakia, in 1920, the Catholic Church suffered a schism as the Czechoslovak Hussite Church re-established itself as an independent organism. In 1939–1945, Nazism annihilated or expelled most of the Jewish population. The Catholic Church lost about half of its adherents during the Marxist-Leninist period of the Czechoslovak Socialist Republic (1960–1990), and has continued to decline in the contemporary epoch after the Velvet Revolution of 1989 restored liberal democracy in Czechoslovakia. Protestantism did not recover immediately after the Habsburg Counter-Reformation; it regained some ground when the Habsburg monarchy disintegrated in the early 20th century (in 1950 about 17% of the Czechs were Protestants, mostly Hussites), although after the 1950s it declined again and today it is a very small minority (around 1%).

According to the official censuses conducted by the Czech Statistical Office, Catholicism was the religion of 39.1% of the Czechs in 1991 and has declined to 9.3% in 2021; Protestantism and other types of Christianity declined in the same period from around 5% to around 2%; at the same time, adherents of other religions or believers without an identifiable religion grew from 0.3% to 10.8%. Small minority religions in the Czech Republic include Buddhism, Islam, Paganism, Hinduism, Judaism, and others. In the census of 2021, 47.8% of Czechs declared that they did not believe in any religion, while 30.1% did not respond.

== Demographics ==
=== Census statistics, 1921–2021 ===
Religious affiliations in the Czech Republic, census 1921–2021
Religion	1921		1930		1950		1991		2001		2011		2021	
Religion	Number	%	Number	%	Number	%	Number	%	Number	%	Number	%	Number	%
Christianity	9,150,872	91.5	9,691,392	90.8	8,332,458	93.7	4,518,512	43.9	3,094,227	30.2	1,379,802	13.2	1,241,214	11.7
—Catholicism	8,210,771	82.1	8,390,228	78.6	6,824,908	76.7	4,028,415	39.1	2,748,455	26.9	1,092,346	10.5	985,318	9.3
——Roman Catholic Church	8,201,464	82.0	8,378,079	78.5	6,792,046	76.3	4,021,385	39.0	2,740,780	26.8	1,082,463	10.4	741,175	7.0
——Catholics without church	–	–	–	–	–	–	–	–	–	–	–	–	235,834	2.2
——Ruthenian Greek Catholic Church	9,307	0.1	12,149	0.1	32,862	0.4	7,030	0.1	7,675	0.1	9,883	0.1	8,309	0.1
—Eastern Orthodox Church (majority Czech and Slovak)	9,221	0.1	24,488	0.2	50,365	0.6	19,354	0.2	22,968	0.2	26,370	0.2	41,178	0.4
—Evangelical Church of Czech Brethren	231,199	2.3	290,994	2.7	401,729	4.5	203,996	2.0	117,212	1.1	51,858	0.5	32,577	0.3
—Czechoslovak Hussite Church	523,232	5.2	779,672	7.3	946,813	10.6	178,036	1.7	99,103	1.0	39,229	0.4	23,610	0.2
—Jehovah's Witnesses	–	–	–	–	–	–	14,575	0.1	23,162	0.2	13,069	0.1	13,298	0.1
—Augsburg Confession Lutheran churches (majority Silesian)	150,687	1.5	52,485	0.5	80,144	0.9	37,281	0.4	34,317	0.3	17,379	0.2	11,047	0.1
—German Evangelical Church in Bohemia, Moravia and Silesia	–	–	130,981	1.2	6,401	0.1	–	–	–	–	–	–	–	–
—Old Catholic Church of the Czech Republic	20,103	0.2	22,544	0.2	–	–	2,725	0.03	1,605	0.02	1,730	0.02	672	0.01
—Other Christians (Note: "Other Christians" in the census include people who declared themselves simply "Christians" without denomination, as well as Anglicans, Adventists, Apostolic Pentecostals, Baptists, Brethren, Methodists, Mormons, Moravian Hussites, Unificationists, and nondenominational Evangelicals.)	14,966	0.1	31,033	0.3	22,098	0.2	34,130	0.3	47,405	0.5	137,821	1.3	133,514	1.3
Jediism	–	–	–	–	–	–	–	–	–	–	15,070	0.1	21,539	0.2
Buddhism	–	–	–	–	–	–	–	–	6,817	0.07	6,101	0.06	5,757	0.05
Islam	–	–	–	–	–	–	495	0.0	3,699	0.04	3,358	0.03	5,244	0.05
Paganism	–	–	–	–	–	–	–	–	–	–	863	0.01	2,953	0.03
Pastafarianism	–	–	–	–	–	–	–	–	–	–	–	–	2,696	0.03
Hinduism	–	–	–	–	–	–	–	–	1,061	0.01	2,408	0.02	2,024	0.02
Judaism	125,083	1.3	117,551	1.1	8,038	0.1	1,292	0.01	1,515	0.01	1,474	0.01	1,901	0.02
Biotronics	–	–	–	–	–	–	–	–	–	–	–	–	1,053	0.01
Other religion	2,393	0.02	266	0.002	12,786	0.1	35,651	0.3	180,769	1.8	628	0.01	89,254	0.8
Believers without religion	–	–	–	–	–	–	–	–	–	–	760,316	7.3	1,005,788	9.6
No religion	716,515	7.2	834,144	7.8	519,962	5.8	4,112,864	39.9	6,039,991	59.0	3,604,095	34.5	5,027,794	47.8
Not stated	10,871	0.1	31,033	0.3	22,889	0.3	1,665,617	16.2	901,981	8.8	4,662,455	44.7	3,162,540	30.1
Total population	10,005,734		10,674,386		8,896,133		10,302,215		10,230,060		10,436,560		10,524,167	

=== Line chart of trends, 1921–2021 ===
Census statistics 1921–2021:

View source data.

== Irreligious people ==
Age composition of irreligious Czechs according to the 2011 census.

In the 2021 census, 5,027,794 Czechs, corresponding to 47.8% of the total population of the Czech Republic, identified themselves as irreligious, including atheism, agnosticism and other irreligious life stances. Some Czech atheists have organised themselves in the Civic Association of Atheists (Občanské sdružení ateistů), which is a member of the Atheist Alliance International. Not all irreligious Czechs are atheists; a number of non-religious people believe or practise unorganised forms of spirituality which do not require strict adherence or identification, similar to Eastern religions.

== Religions ==
=== Christianity ===
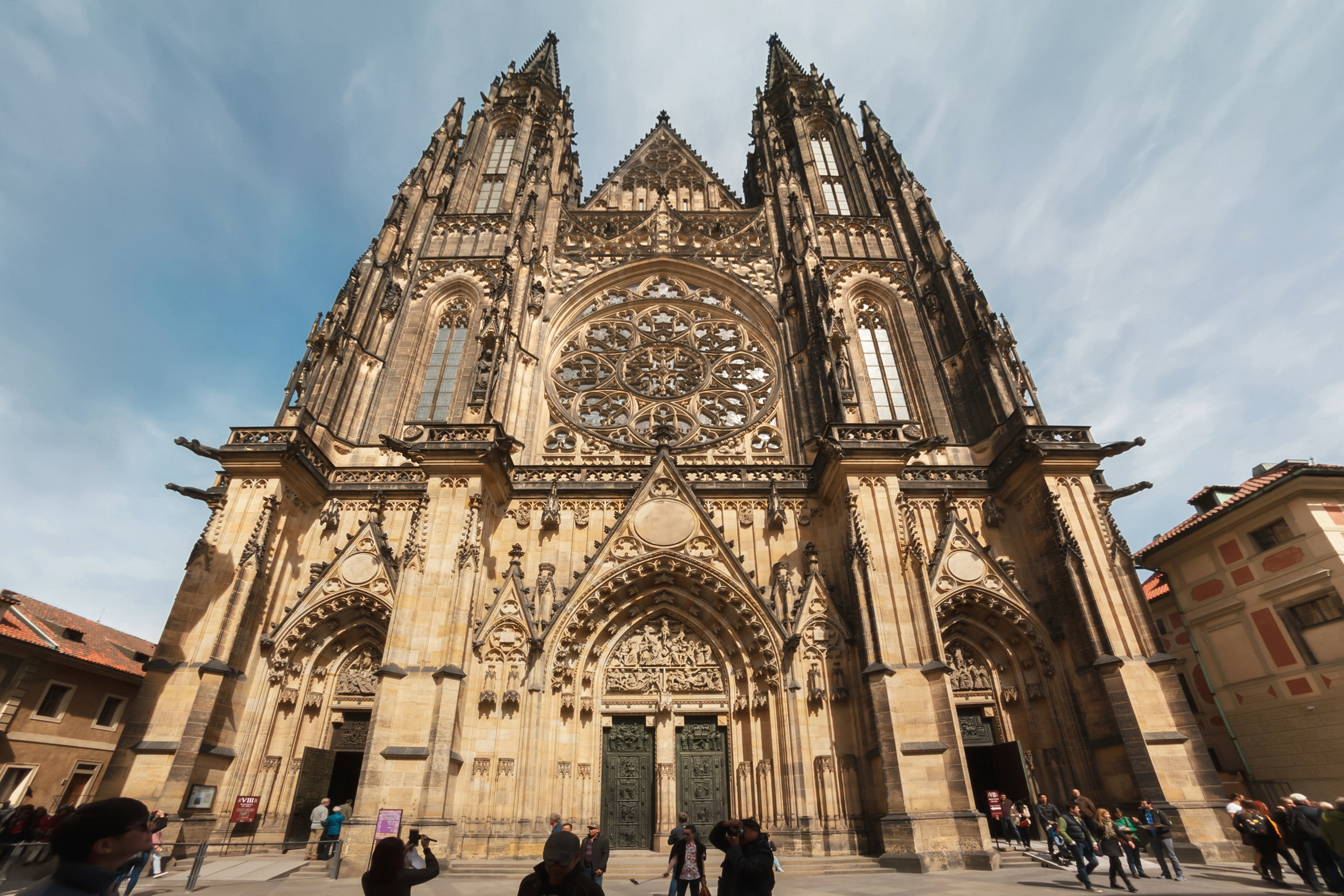
Cathedral of Saint Vitus Adalbert and Wenceslaus, the seat of the Roman Catholic Archbishop of Prague

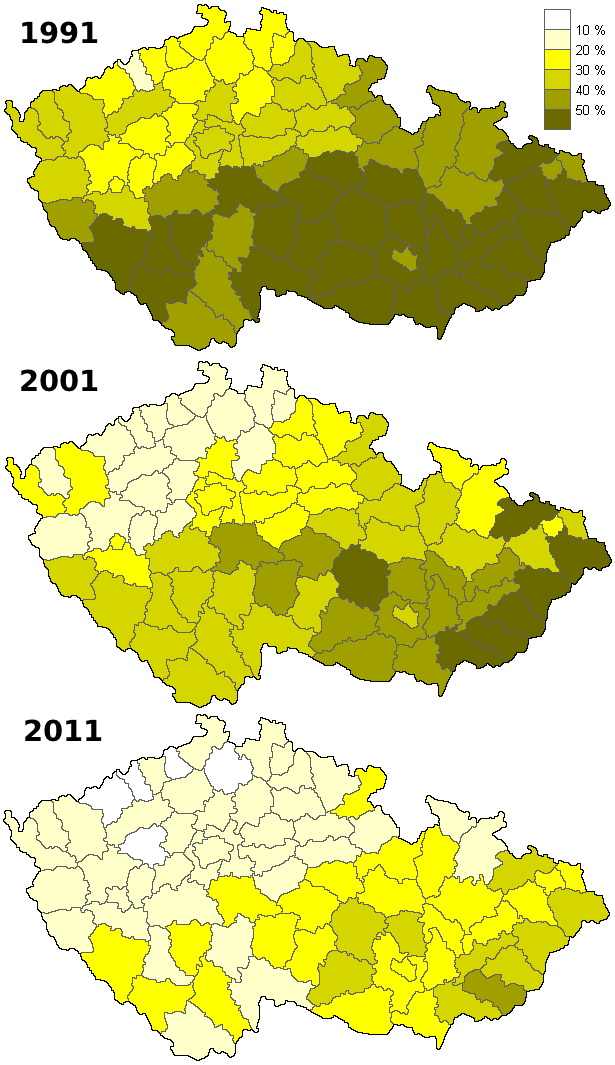
The decline of Christianity recorded throughout the censuses of 1991, 2001 and 2011

The Czechs gradually converted to Christianity from Slavic paganism between the 9th and the 10th centuries, and Christianity—especially the Catholic Church, with significant minorities of Protestantism, and even majorities in some periods, from the 15th century onwards—remained the religion of nearly all the population until the end of the 19th century. Bořivoj I, Duke of Bohemia, baptised by the Saints Cyril and Methodius, was the first ruler of Bohemia to adopt Christianity as the state religion. Since the late 19th century, and especially throughout the 20th century, Christianity was gradually abandoned by the majority of the Czechs and today it remains the religion of a minority. From 1950 to 2021, the official censuses of the Czech Statistical Office recorded a decline of professed Christianity from about 94% to about 12% of the population of the Czech lands.

The Marxist–Leninist period of the Czechoslovak Socialist Republic (1960–1990) certainly saw an oppression of Christianity, thus contributing to its decline, but also hampered the appearance of any alternatives in the area of religion, so that Christianity continued to have a monopolistic position in the religious interpretation of the world. Only the restoration of liberal democracy after the Velvet Revolution of 1989 opened the country to the spread of non-Christian religions. According to the scholar Jan Spousta, throughout the 20th century Christianity gradually lost its character as the Czechs' traditional religion, and was abandoned by most while turning into a religion of sincere choice for the minority who continues to identify itself with it and practise it. Spousta also found that Christians in the early 21st century tended to be older and less educated than the general population, and females were far more likely than males to be believers. Christianity remained relatively higher in percentage among the populations of the agrarian south-eastern regions of Moravia, while the percentages were already very low in the large cities and the north-western more industrialised regions of Bohemia.

==== Catholicism ====
Catholicism was the main tradition of Christianity historically practised by the Czechs after they converted from Slavic paganism, and although in the 15th and 16th century many Czechs—in many areas and periods most—joined Proto-Protestant and Protestant churches, the Habsburg monarchy which gained imperial power on the Czech lands in the early 17th century enacted a Counter-Reformation movement which reconverted most Czechs to the Catholic Church. By the time of the collapse of the Habsburg power and the establishment of independent Czechoslovakia in 1918, the position of the Catholic Church had already been weakened by criticism from the intellectual class and by the social changes brought by the rapid industrialisation of especially the northern and western parts of the country, Bohemia. At the same time, the association of Catholicism with the unpopular erstwhile Habsburg power led to widespread anticlericalism and anti-Catholicism, and to a revival of the native historical form of Czech Protestantism, namely Hussitism; in 1920, Hussites split out of the Catholic Church with about 10% of the formerly Catholic clergy and established themselves as the Czechoslovak Hussite Church.

From 1950 onwards, Marxist–Leninists gained power in Czechoslovakia, which from 1960 to 1989 became the Czechoslovak Socialist Republic, and while they fought all religions, Catholicism was targeted with particular aggressiveness. After the Velvet Revolution in 1989 and the restoration of liberal democracy in the Czech lands, Catholicism, like other forms of Christianity, did not recover and continued to lose adherents. The data from the national censuses show that Catholics decreased from 76.7% of the Czechs in 1950 prior to the Marxist-Leninist period, to 39.1% in 1991 after the fall of Marxism-Leninism, to 26.9% in 2001, to 10.5% in 2011, and to 9.3% in 2021.

==== Protestantism ====
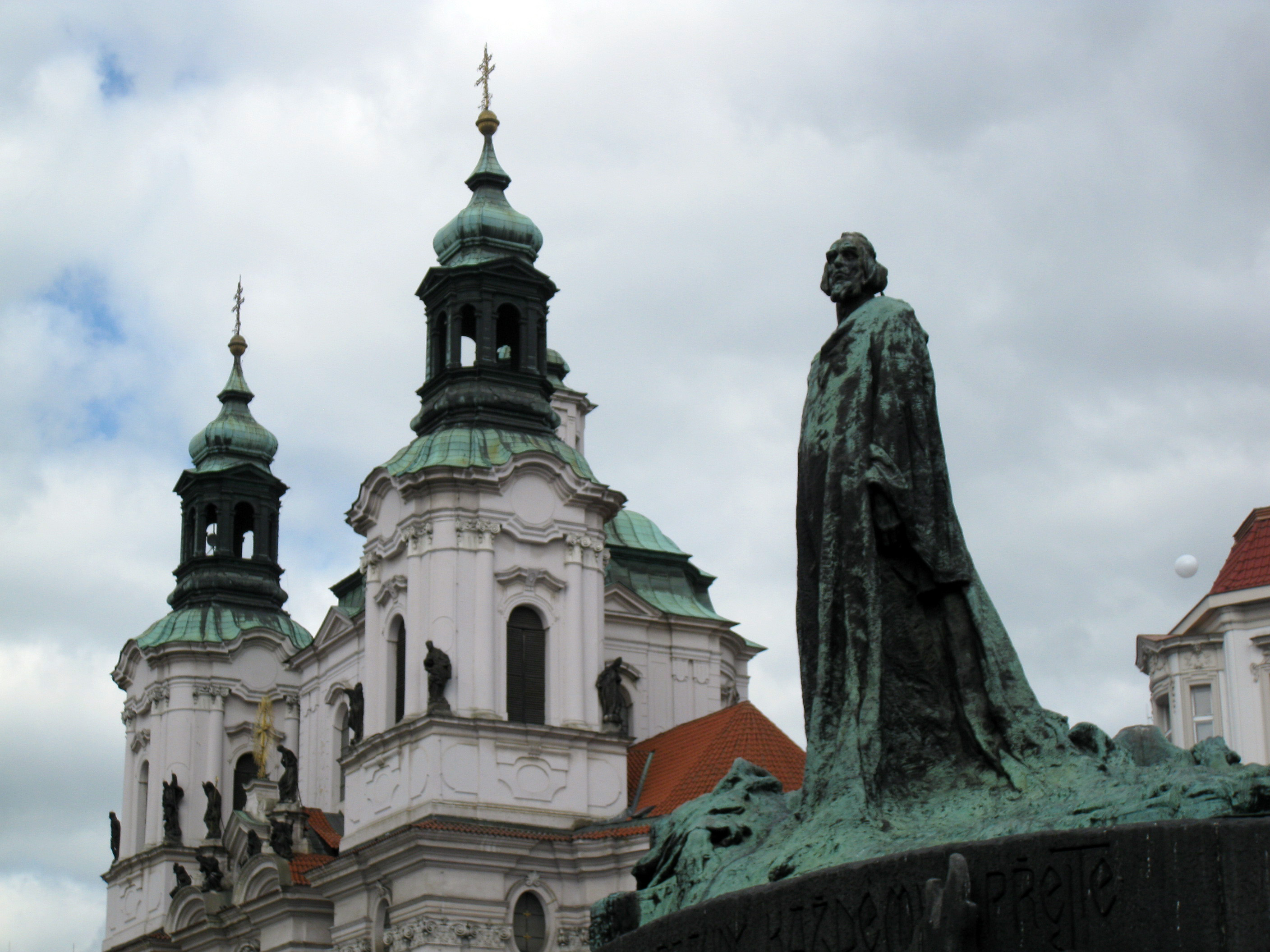
Church of Saint Nicholas, the main church of the Czechoslovak Hussite Church with the Jan Hus Memorial, in Prague. Jan Hus (1369–1415), a key figure of the Bohemian Reformation, inspired the Proto-Protestant movement of Hussitism.

In the late 14th century, the religious and social reformer Jan Hus started a Proto-Protestant movement which would later be called Hussitism after him. Although Jan Hus was declared heretic by the Catholic Church and burnt at the stake in Constance in 1415, his followers seceded from the Catholic Church and in the Hussite Wars (1419–1434) they defeated five crusades organised against them by the Holy Roman Emperor Sigismund. Petr Chelčický continued in the wake of the Bohemian Hussite Reformation and gave rise to the Hussite Moravian Church. During the 15th and 16th century, most of Czechs were adherents of Hussitism, and at the same time many Sudeten Germans of the Czech lands joined the Protestant Reformation of Martin Luther and his doctrine (Lutheranism).

After 1526, Bohemia came increasingly under the control of the Habsburg monarchy, as the Habsburgs became first the elected and later the hereditary rulers of Bohemia. The Defenestration of Prague and the subsequent revolt against the Habsburgs in 1618 marked the start of the Thirty Years' War, which quickly spread throughout Central Europe. In 1620, the rebellion in Bohemia was crushed at the Battle of White Mountain, and the ties between Bohemia and the Habsburgs' hereditary lands in Austria were strengthened. The war had a devastating effect on the local population, and the people were forced to convert back to Catholicism under the Habsburgs' Counter-Reformation efforts.

In 1918, when the Habsburg monarchy disintegrated and independent Czechoslovakia emerged, most of the Czechs professed formal affiliation to Catholicism; anti-Catholic sentiments spread quickly as Catholicism was viewed as the religion re-imposed by the Habsburg, so that in 1920 the Czechoslovak Hussite Church split off the Catholic Church and was joined by about 10% of the former Catholic clergy, and 10.6% of the Czechs had become again Hussites by 1950. The Czechoslovak Church was supported by the government of the first president of Czechoslovakia, Tomáš Masaryk (1850–1937). In the same years, the Evangelical Church of Czech Brethren (a doctrinally mixed church of Lutheran, Calvinist and Hussite traditions) represented another 4.5% of the population, and another 1% were members of Lutheran churches of the Augsburg Confession (mostly of the Silesian Evangelical Church of the Augsburg Confession).

During the Marxist–Leninist years of the Czechoslovak Socialist Republic all religions were discouraged by the government; the Czech Protestant churches lost many members (the Czechoslovak Church lost 80% of its adherents), and they continued to decline after the restoration of liberal democracy after 1989. Protestantism today constitutes a small minority of around 1% of the population; according to the 2021 census, only 0.2% of the Czechs (23,610) adhered to the Czechoslovak Hussite Church, 0.3% (32,577) adhered to the Evangelical Church of Czech Brethren, and 0.1% (11,047) were Lutherans of the Augsburg Confession (still mostly Silesian). The Moravian Church, historically tied to the region of Moravia, was still present with a very small number of adherents, about 1,257. Other Protestant minorities include Anglicans, Adventists, Apostolic Pentecostals, Baptists, Brethren, Methodists, and nondenominational Evangelicals.

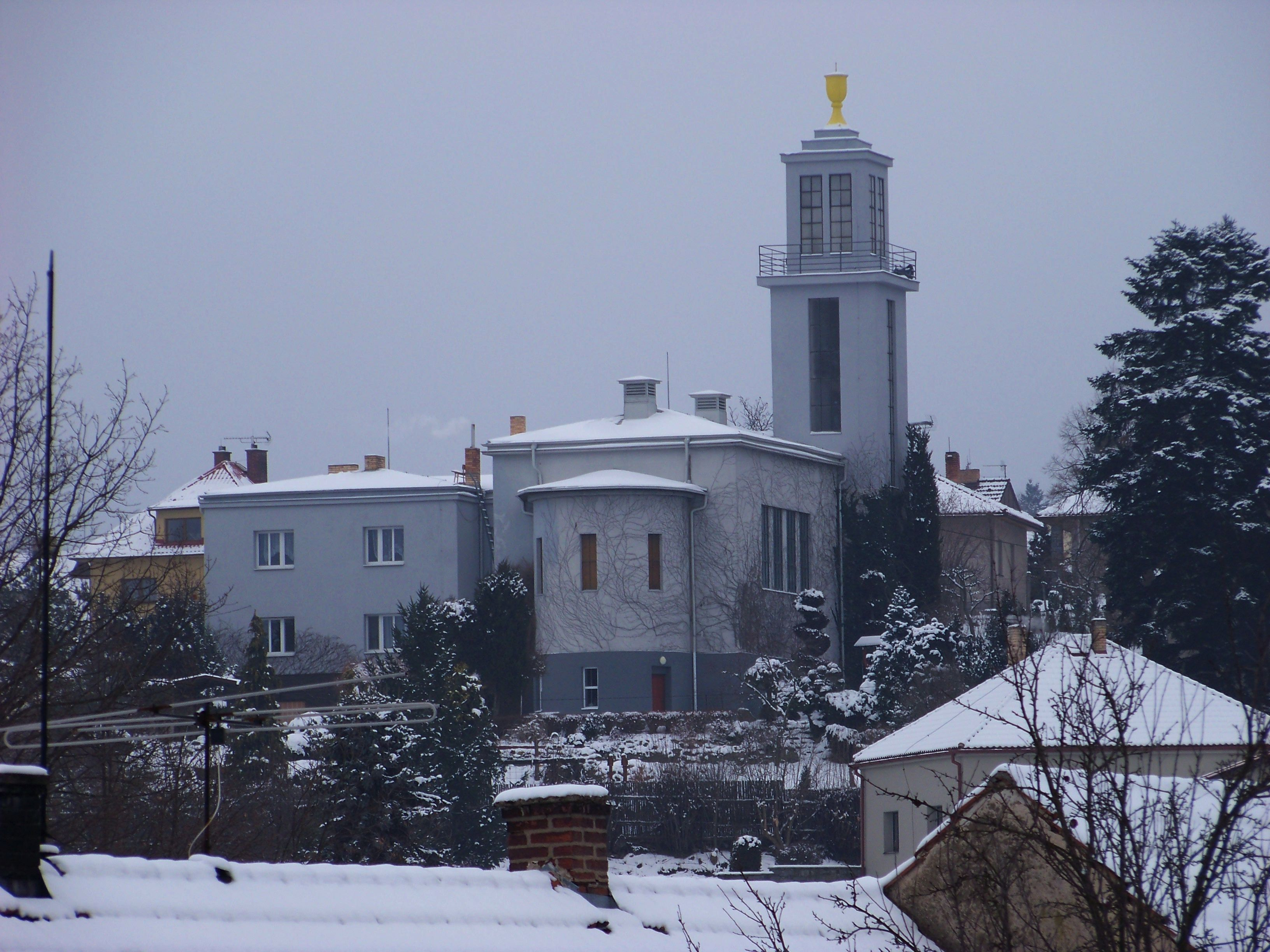
Typical countryside Hussite church of the 20th century in Jílové u Prahy, Central Bohemian Region

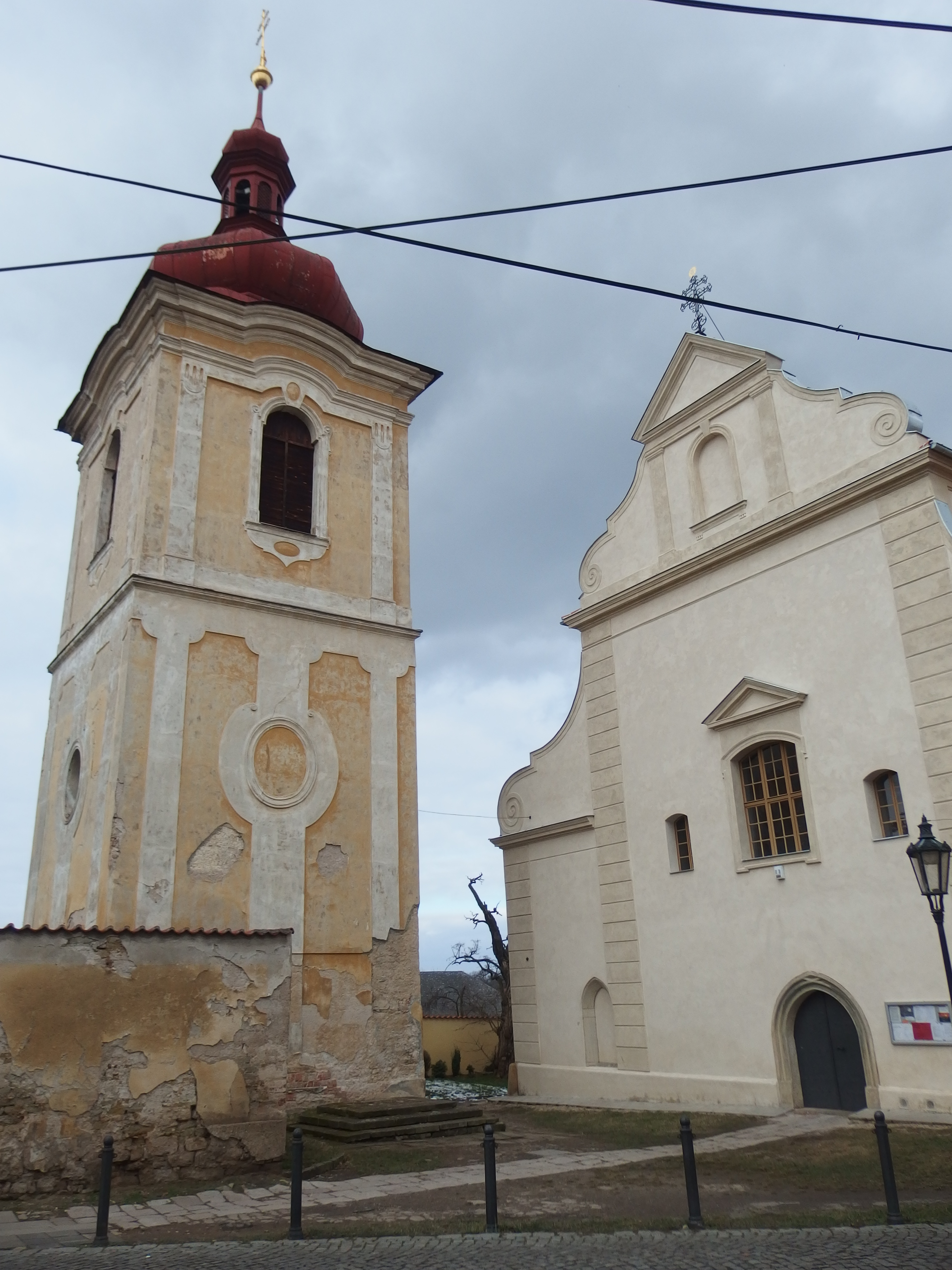
Church of the Conversion of Saint Paul, a historic centre of the Hussite Moravian Church in Brandýs nad Labem-Stará Boleslav, Central Bohemian Region

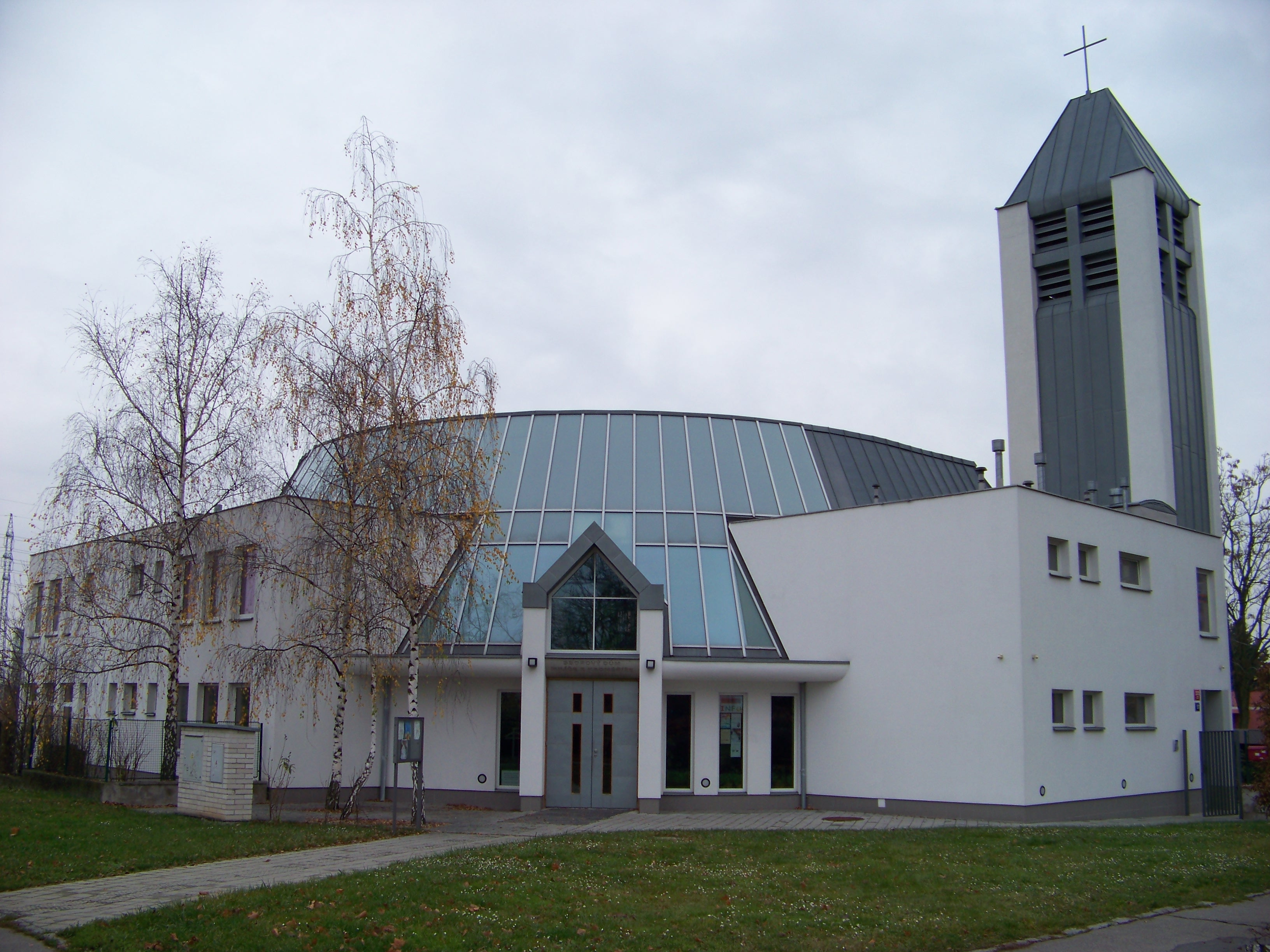
Evangelical Church of the Czech Brethren in Chodov, Prague

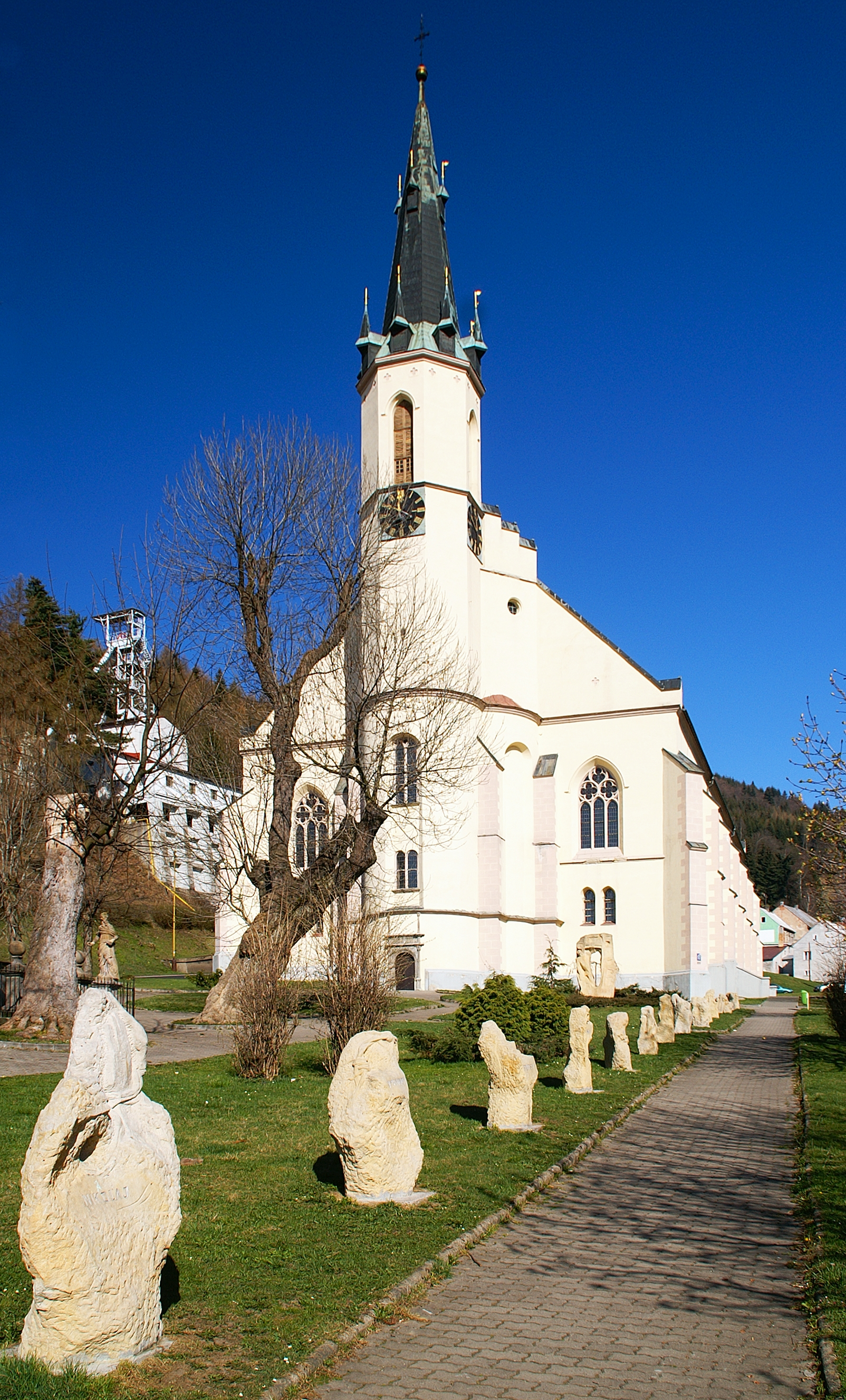
Church of Saint Joachim, a Lutheran church in Jáchymov, Karlovy Vary Region

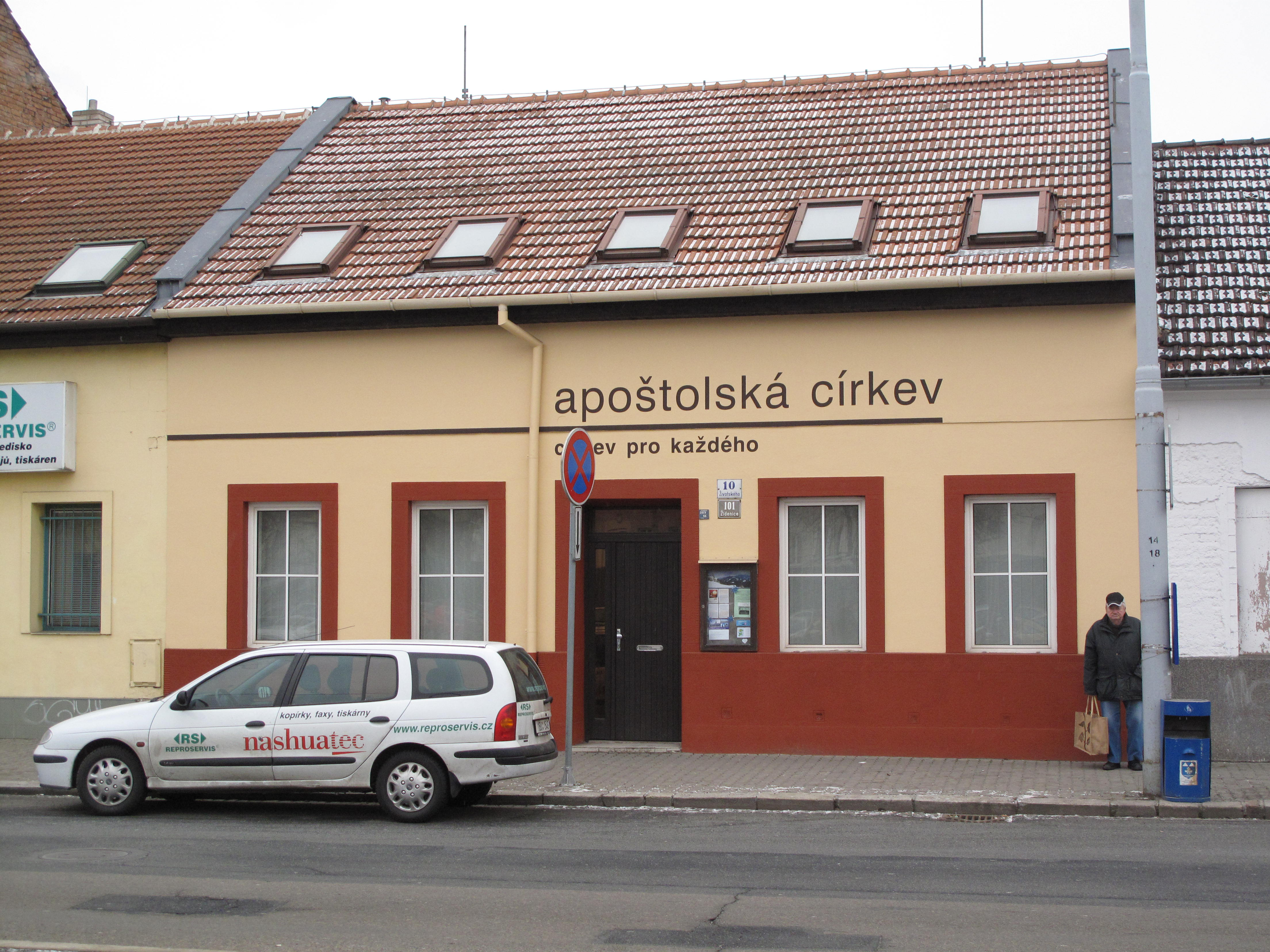
Apostolic Pentecostal church in Brno, South Moravian Region

==== Orthodox Christianity, Jehovah's Witnesses and other Christians ====
In the 2021 census, 41,178 Czechs (0.4% of the population) identified themselves as adherents of the Eastern Orthodox Church, almost all of them members of the Orthodox Church of the Czech Lands and Slovakia and only a few hundred being members of the Czech branch of the Russian Orthodox Church. In the same census, 13,298 (0.1%) identified themselves as Jehovah's Witnesses, and very small minorities as Mormons of the Church of Jesus Christ of Latter-day Saints, adherents of the Unification Church, and of other minor Christian churches. 71,089 Czechs (0.7%) identified themselves simply as "Christians".

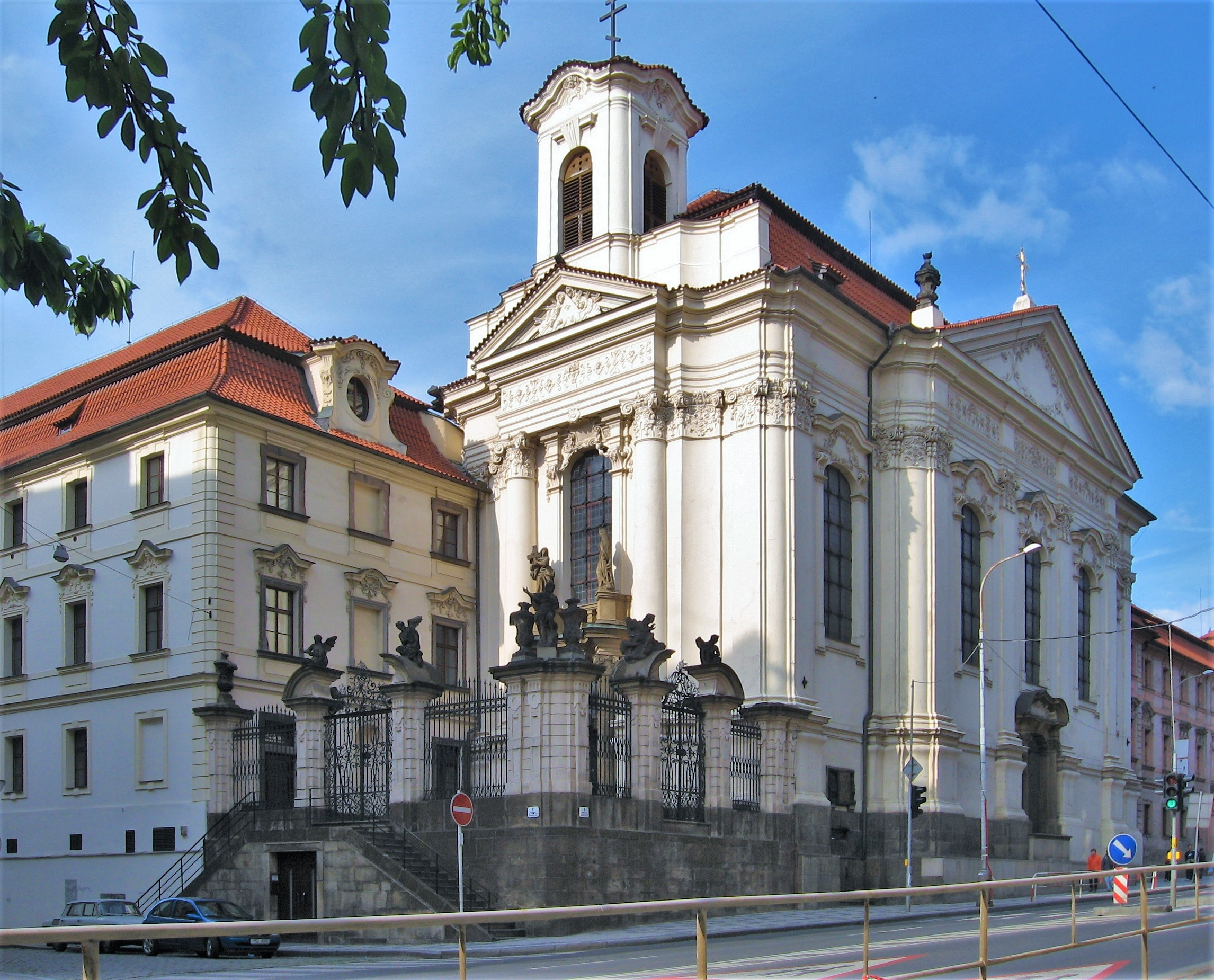
Cathedral of Saints Cyril and Methodius in Prague, the main church of the Czech and Slovak Orthodox Church

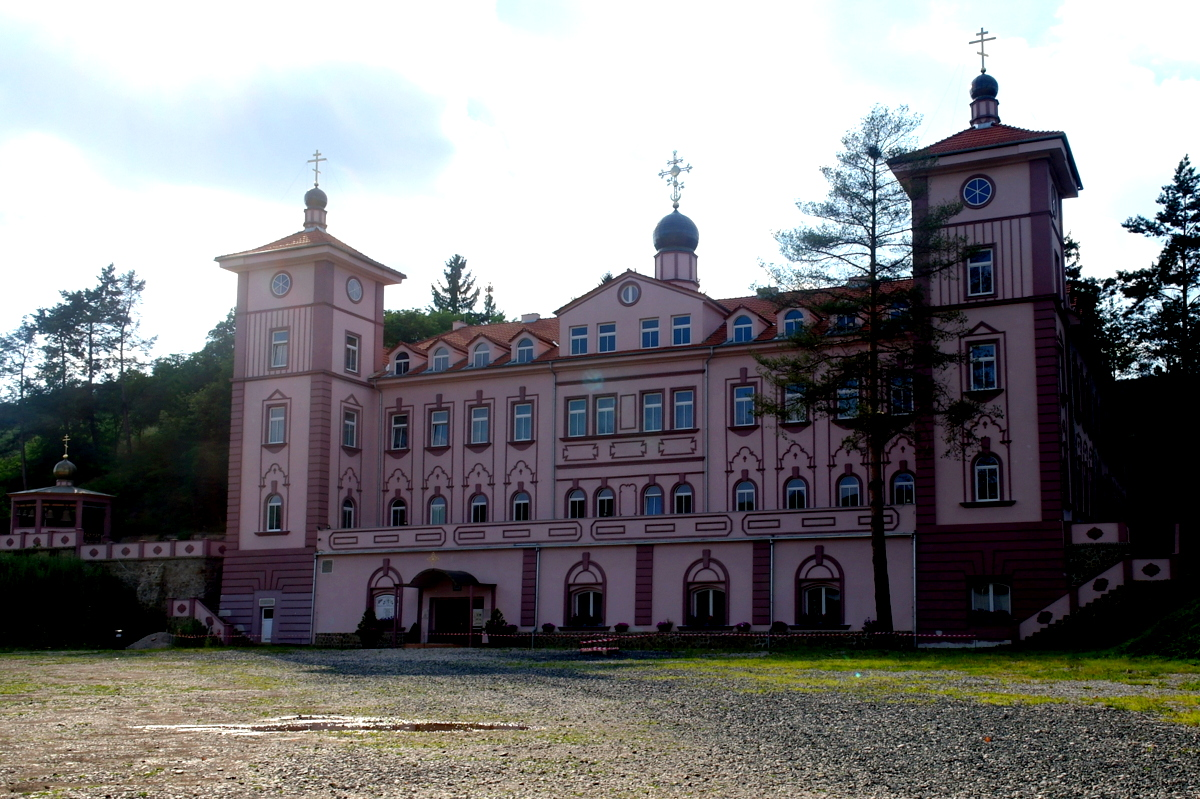
Orthodox Nunnery of Saints Wenceslaus and Ludmila in Loděnice, Central Bohemian Region

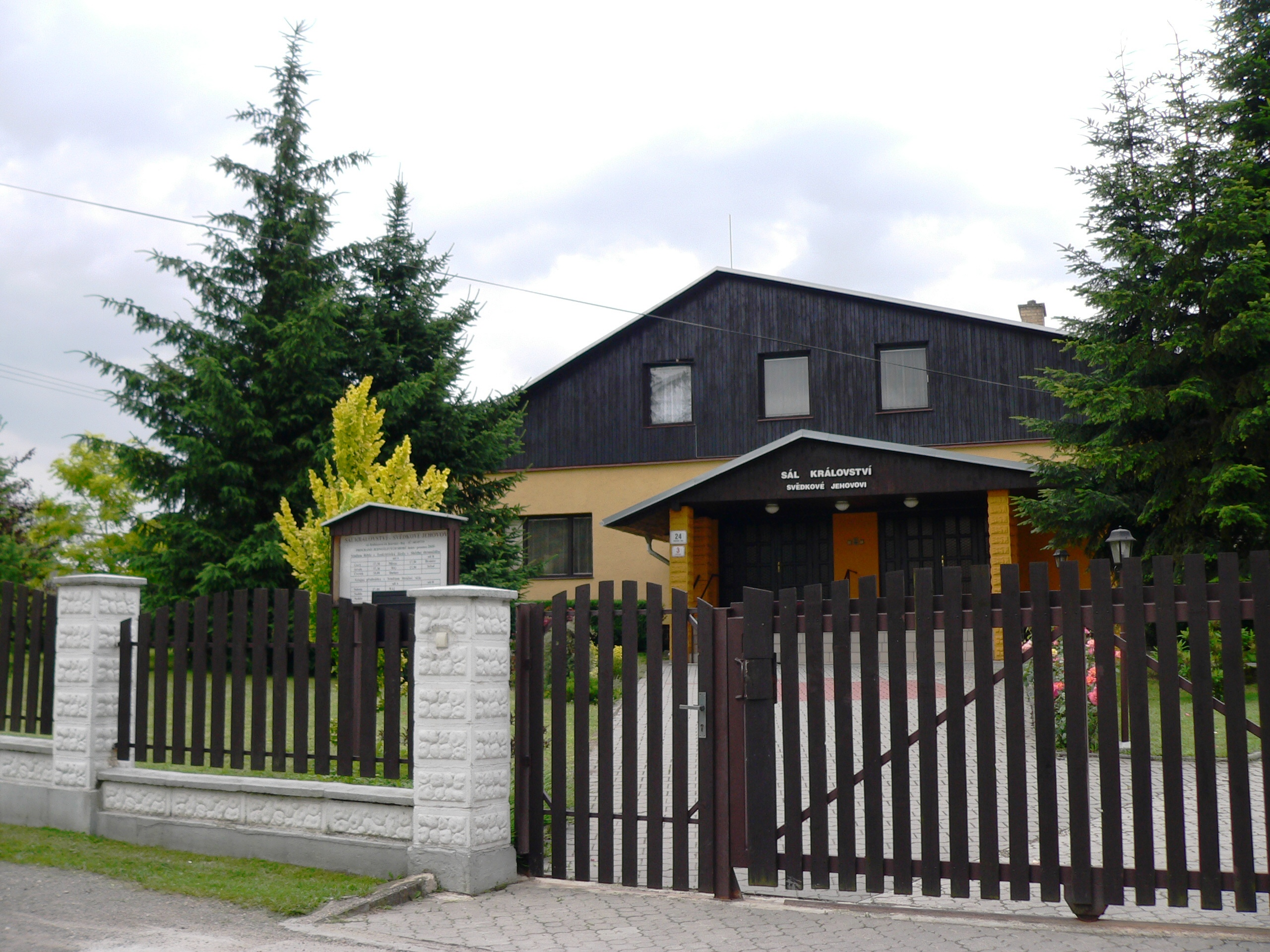
Kingdom hall of the Jehovah's Witnesses in Karviná, Moravian-Silesian Region

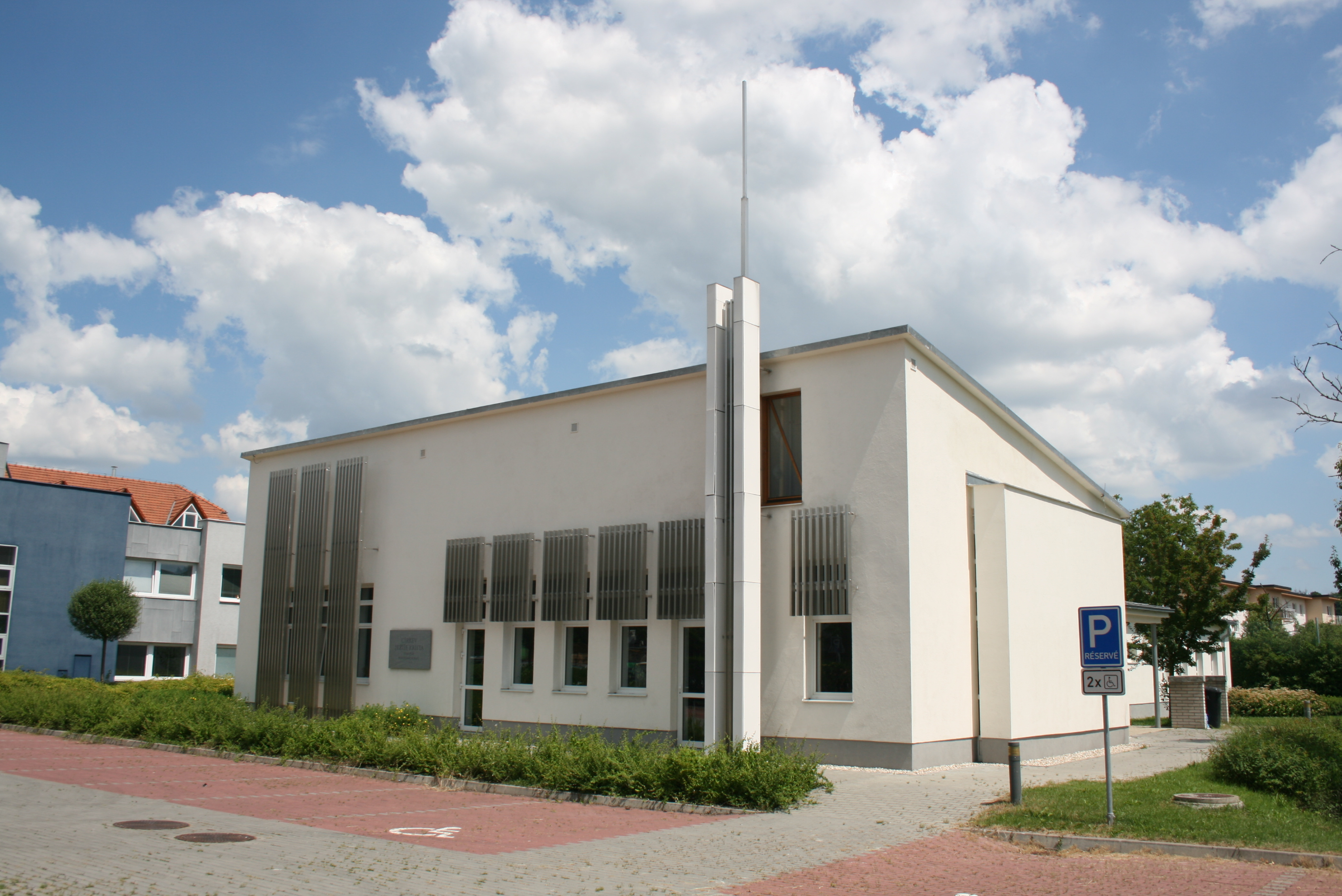
Mormon meetinghouse in Brno, South Moravian Region

=== Buddhism ===
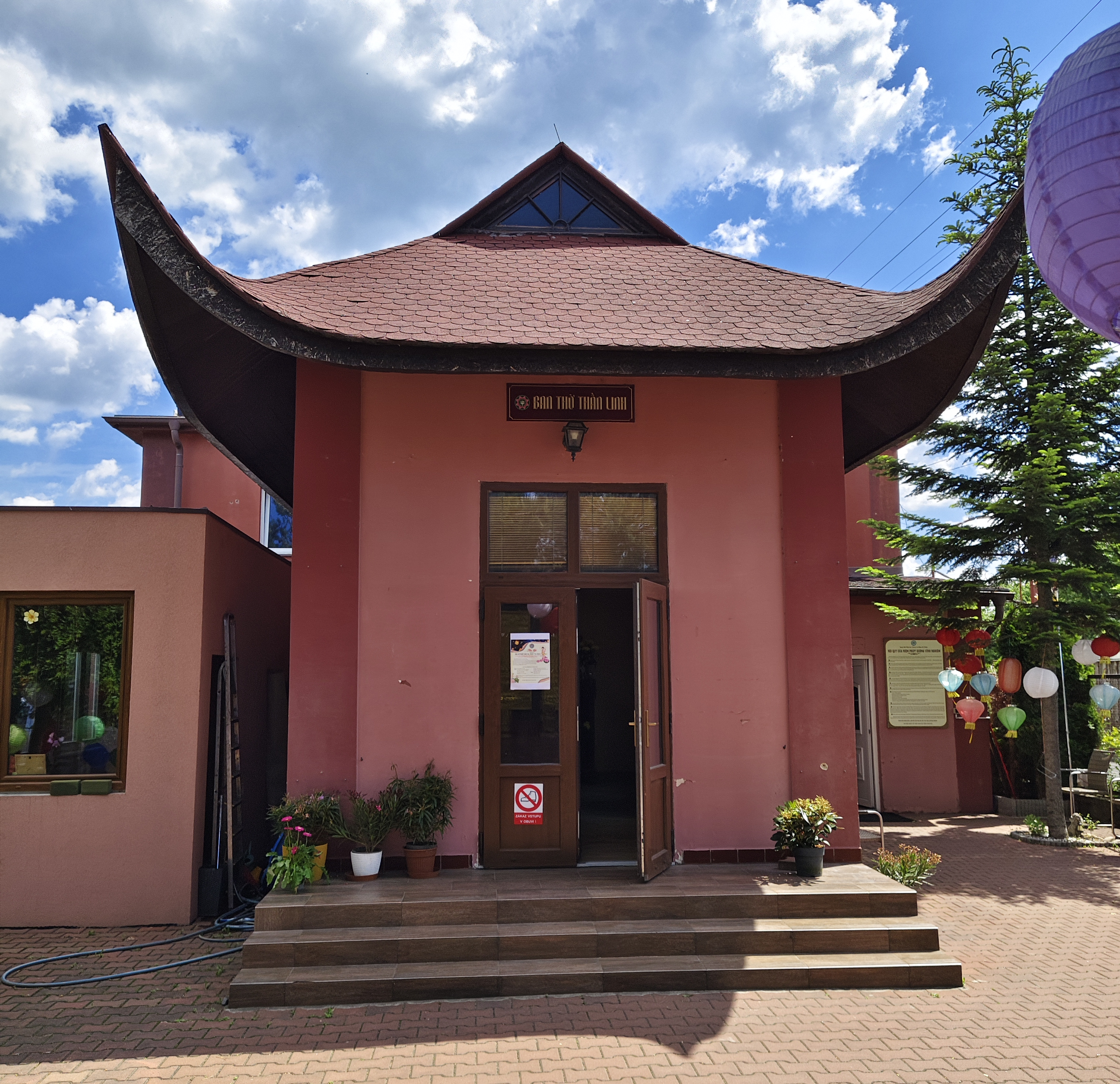
Vietnamese Buddhist temple in Sapa, Prague.

In the 2021 census, 5,257 Czechs declared themselves adherents of Buddhism. Many Vietnamese Czechs, who constitute the largest immigrant ethnic group in the Czech Republic, are adherents of Mahayana traditions of Vietnamese Buddhism. Ethnic Czech Buddhists are otherwise mostly followers of Vajrayana traditions of Tibetan Buddhism, Mahayana traditions of Korean Buddhism, and Theravada traditions. There are various Tibetan Buddhist, Korean Buddhist and Theravada Buddhist centres in the country; many of those of the Tibetan tradition follow the Diamond Way, founded by the Danish lama Ole Nydahl.

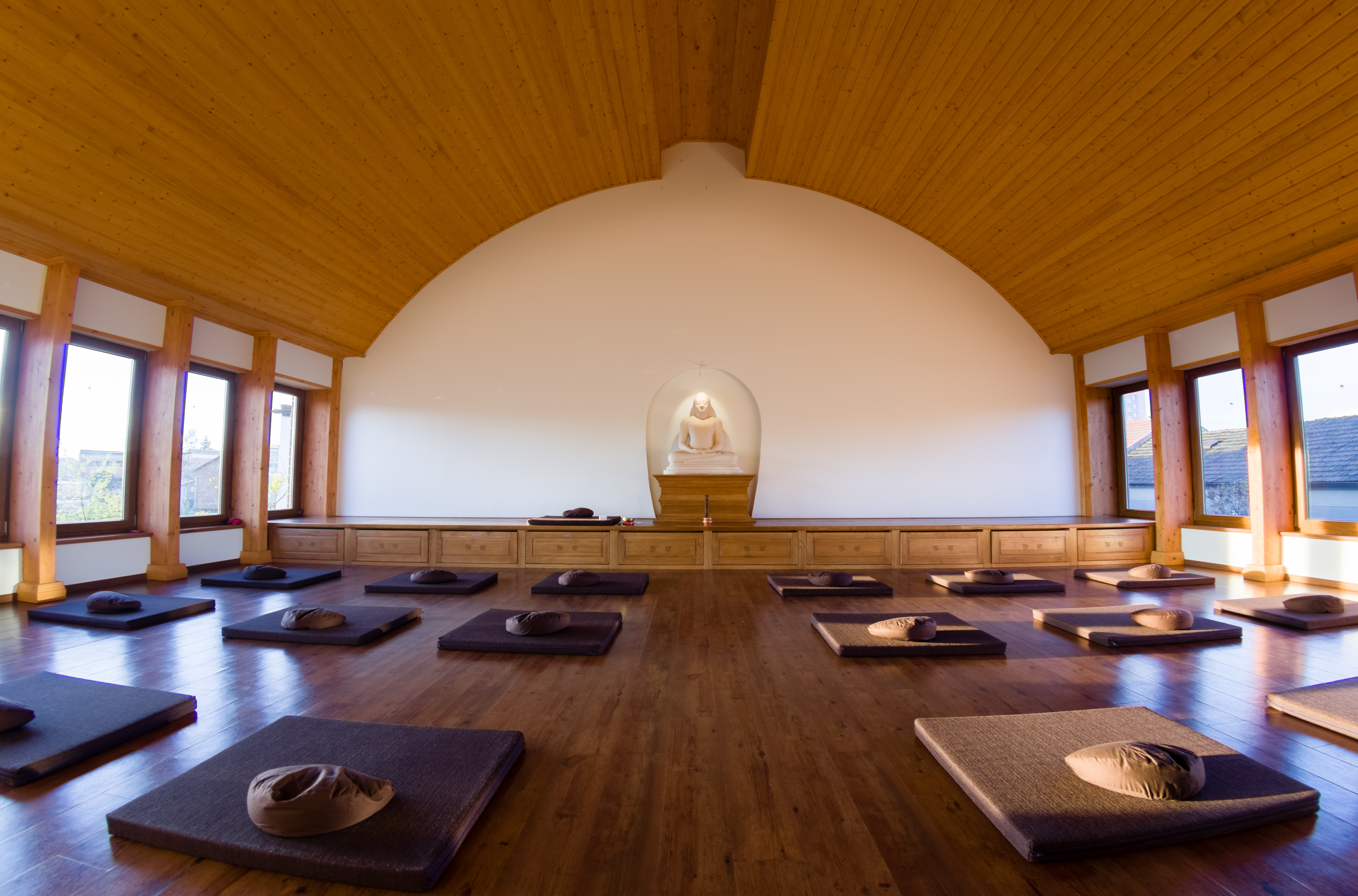
Hall of the Buddhist monastery Ārāma Karuṇā Sevena in Prostějov, Olomouc Region

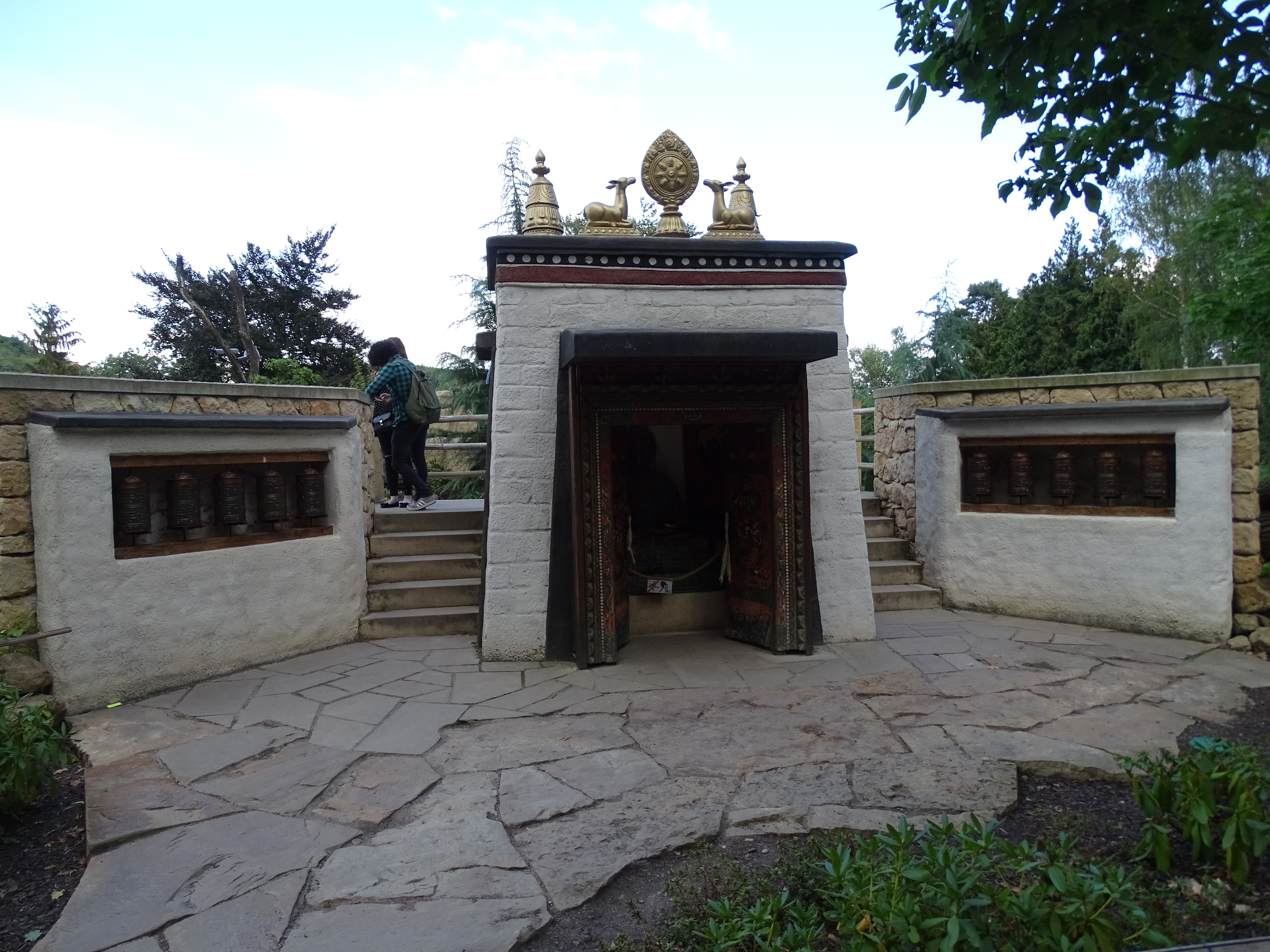
Tibetan Buddhist shrine at the Prague Zoo

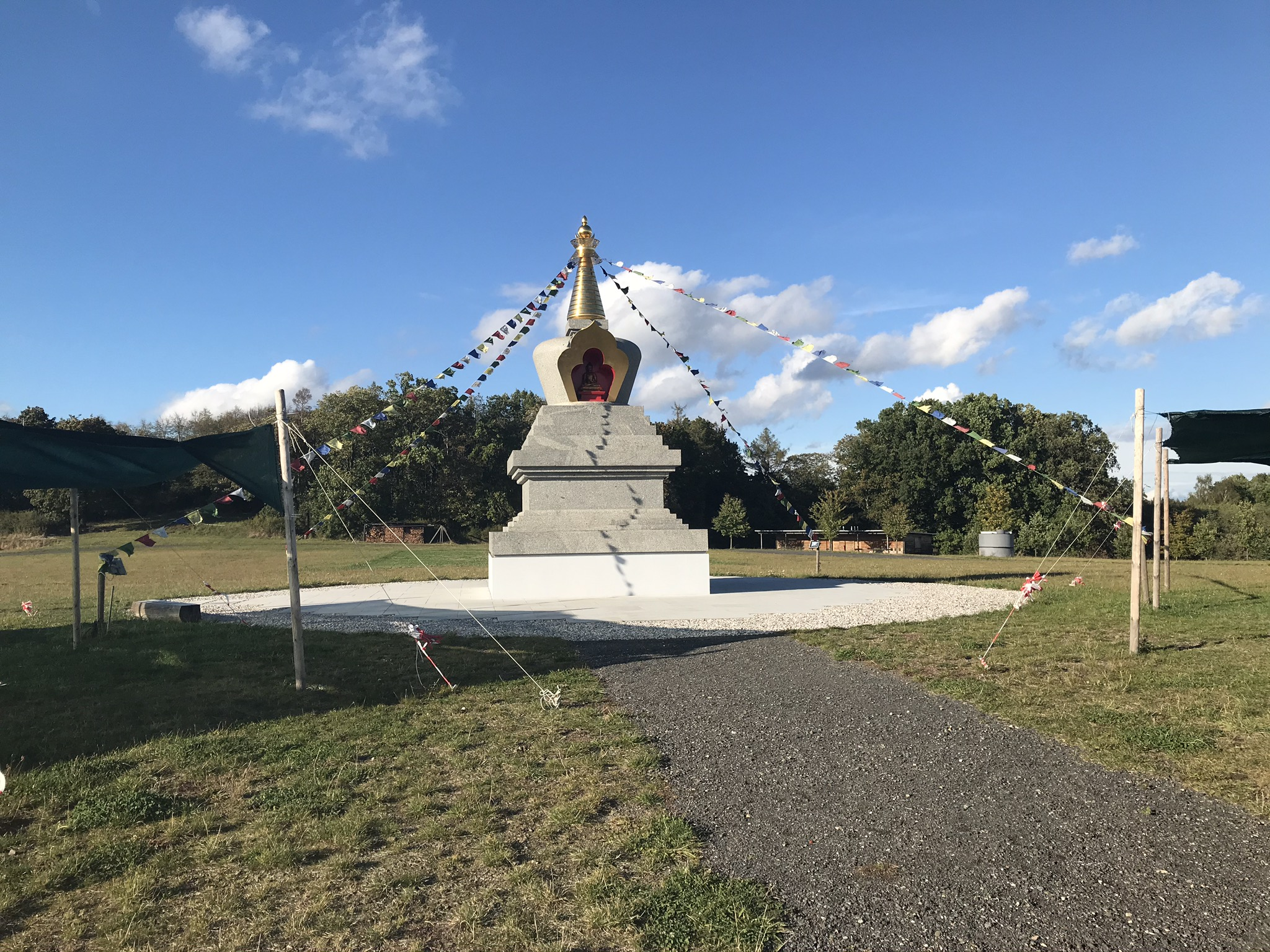
Tibetan Buddhist stupa in Spálené Poříčí, Plzeň Region

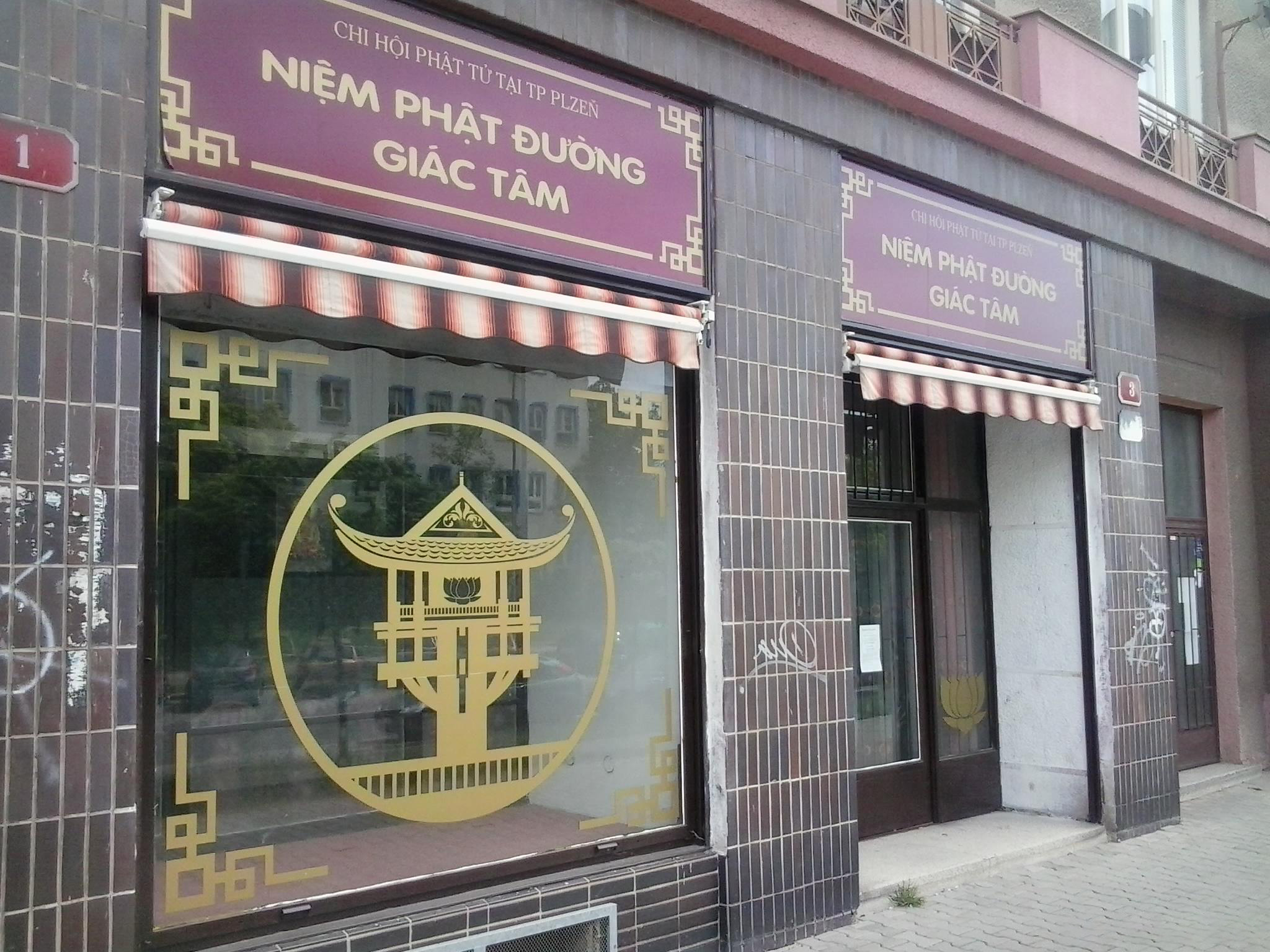
Vietnamese Buddhist hall in Plzeň

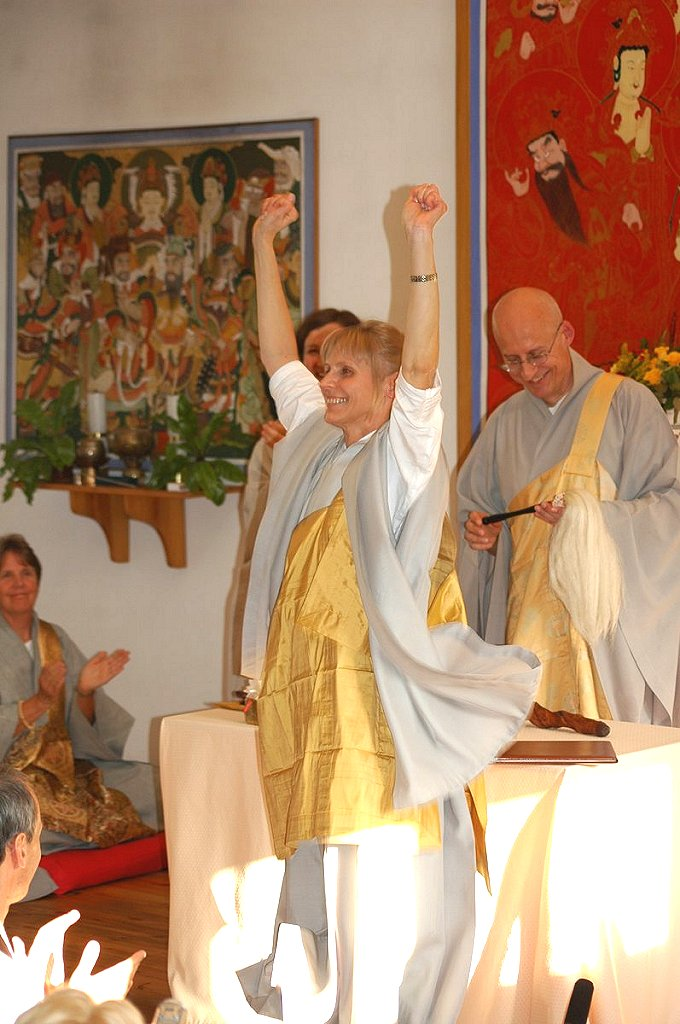
Mistress Bon Shim of the Kwan Um school of Korean Seon Buddhism

=== Paganism ===
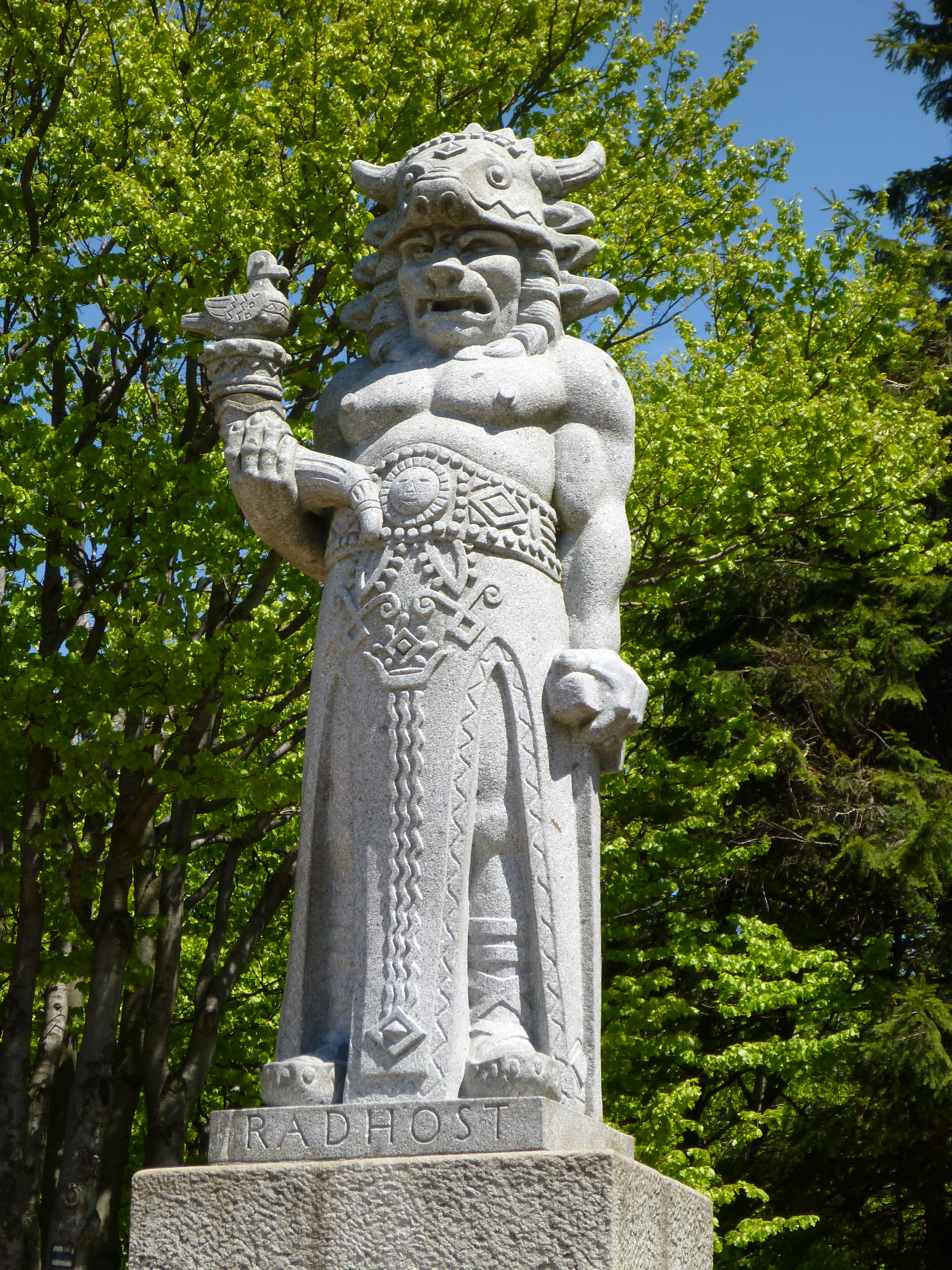
Statue of the Slavic god Radegast on Mount Radhošť, made by the sculptor Albin Polasek. It is object of pilgrimage and worship for local Rodnovers, who also believe that its temporary removal for restoration in 2002 caused the flood which hit Moravia that year.

The entire Pagan community in the Czech Republic, including Slavic Rodnovery (Czech: Rodnověří) as well as other Pagan religions, was described by scholars of religion as small in 2013. In the 2021 census, 2,953 Czechs identified themselves as Pagans (including 189 Druids). The first Pagan groups to emerge in the Czech Republic in the 1990s were oriented towards Germanic Heathenry and Celtic Druidry, while modern Slavic Rodnovery began to develop around 1995–1996 with the foundation of two groups, the National Front of the Castists and Radhoŝť, which in 2000 were merged to form the Community of Native Faith (Společenství Rodná Víra). There are also adherents of the Rodnover denomination of Ynglism; the Civic Association Tartaria (Občanské sdružení Tartaria), headquartered in Slovakia, also caters to Czech Ynglists. Besides Slavic Rodnovers, Germanic Heathens and Celtic Druids, in the Czech Republic there are also Wiccan followers, and one Kemetic organisation, Per Kemet.

The Community of Native Faith was among the government-recognised religious entities until 2010, when it was unregistered and became an informal association due to ideological disagreements between the Castists and other subgroups about whether Slavic religion was Indo-European hierarchic worship (supported by the Castists), Neolithic mother goddess worship, or neither. The leader of the organisation since 2007 has been Richard Bigl (Khotebud), and it is today devoted to the celebration of annual holidays and individual rites of passage, to the restoration of sacred sites associated with Slavic deities, and to the dissemination of knowledge about Slavic spirituality in Czech society. While the contemporary association is completely adogmatic and apolitical, and refuses to "introduce a solid religious or organisational order" due to past internal conflicts, between 2000 and 2010 it had a complex structure, and redacted a Code of Native Faith defining a precise doctrine for Czech Rodnovery (which firmly rejected the Book of Veles). Though Rodná Víra no longer maintains structured territorial groups, it is supported by individual adherents scattered throughout the Czech Republic.

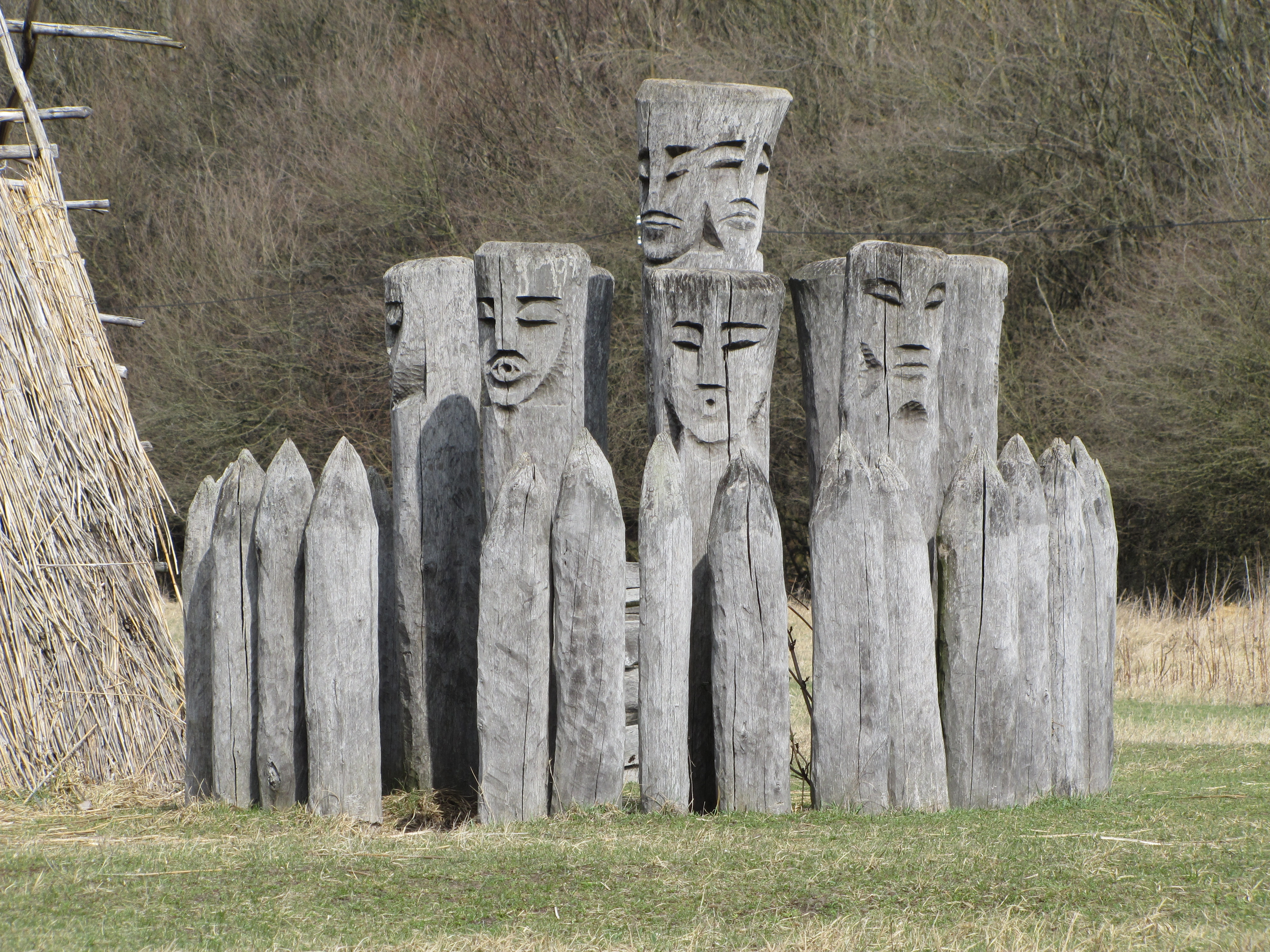
Rodnover idols in Břeclav, South Moravian Region

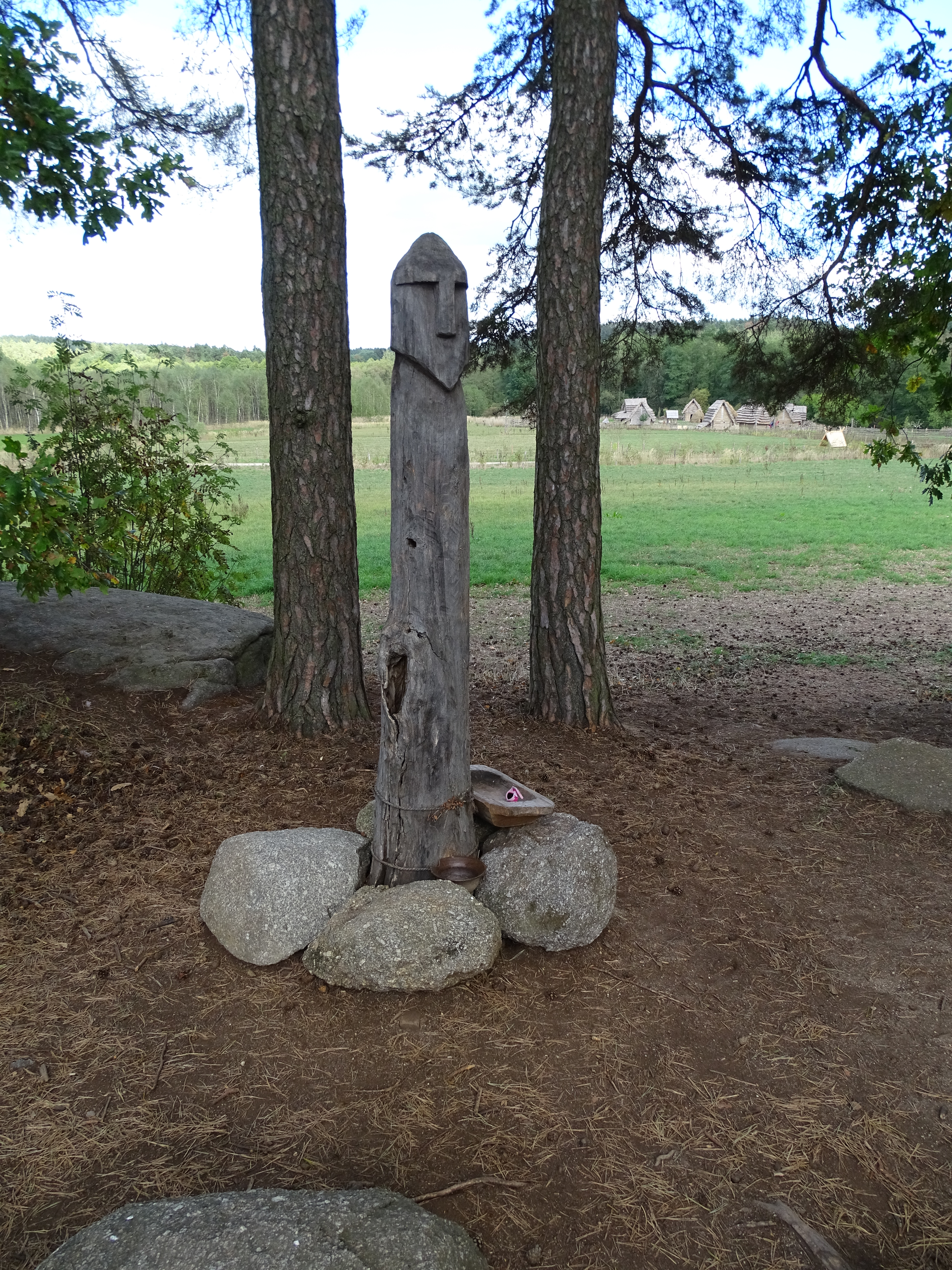
Rodnover idol at a park in Kovářov, South Bohemian Region

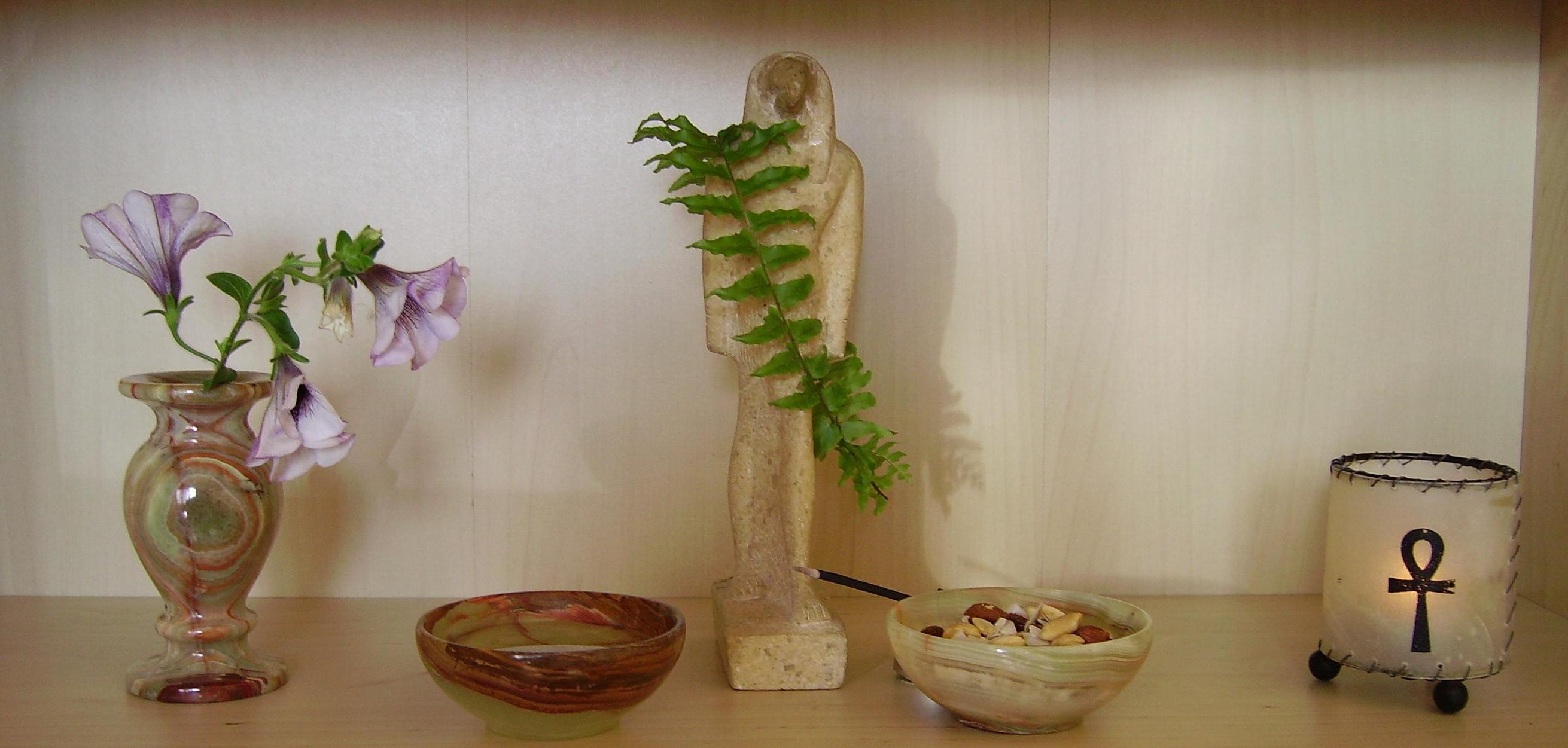
Altar dedicated to the god Thoth by a Czech practitioner of Kemetism

=== Other religions ===
The deep changes in the religious sensibility of the Czechs since the early 20th century, and the loss of religious monopoly and decline of Christianity, opened a space for the growth of new forms of religiousness, including ideas and non-institutional, diffuse models similar to those of Eastern religions, with the spread of movements centred around various gurus, and hermetic and mystical paths.

In the 2021 census, 21,539 Czechs (0.2% of the population) identified themselves as adherents of Jediism (a real philosophy based on that of the fictional Jedi of the Star Wars space opera), 5,244 as Muslims, 2,696 as Pastafarians (an antitheist parody of religion), 2,024 as Hindus, 1,901 as Jews, 1,053 as adherents of Biotronics (incorporated as the Society of Josef Zezulka), and 89,254 (0.8% of the population) as adherents of other minority religions. Another 9.6% of the Czechs declared themselves as having some belief but not identifiable with any specific religion.

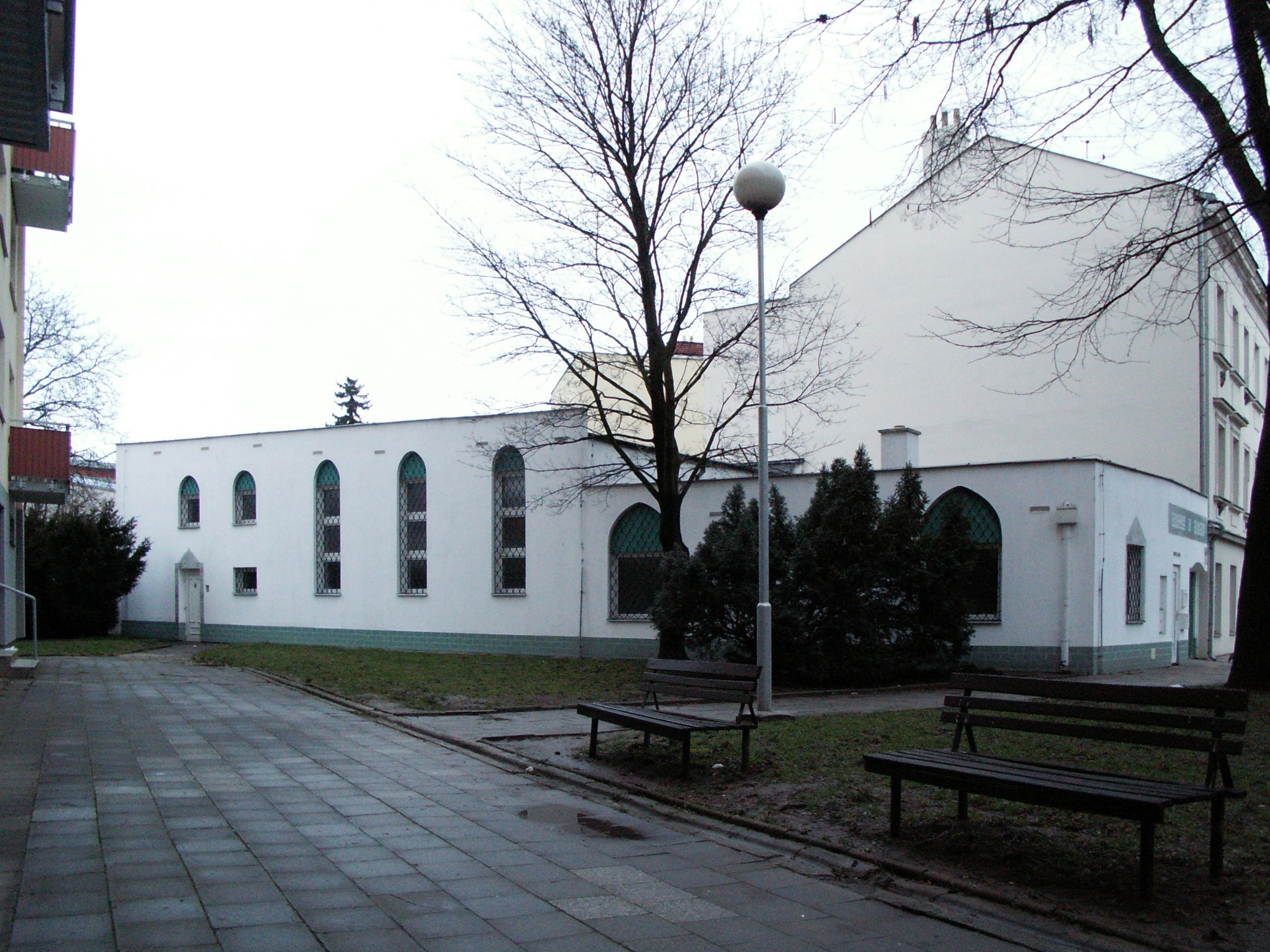
Mosque of Brno, South Moravian Region

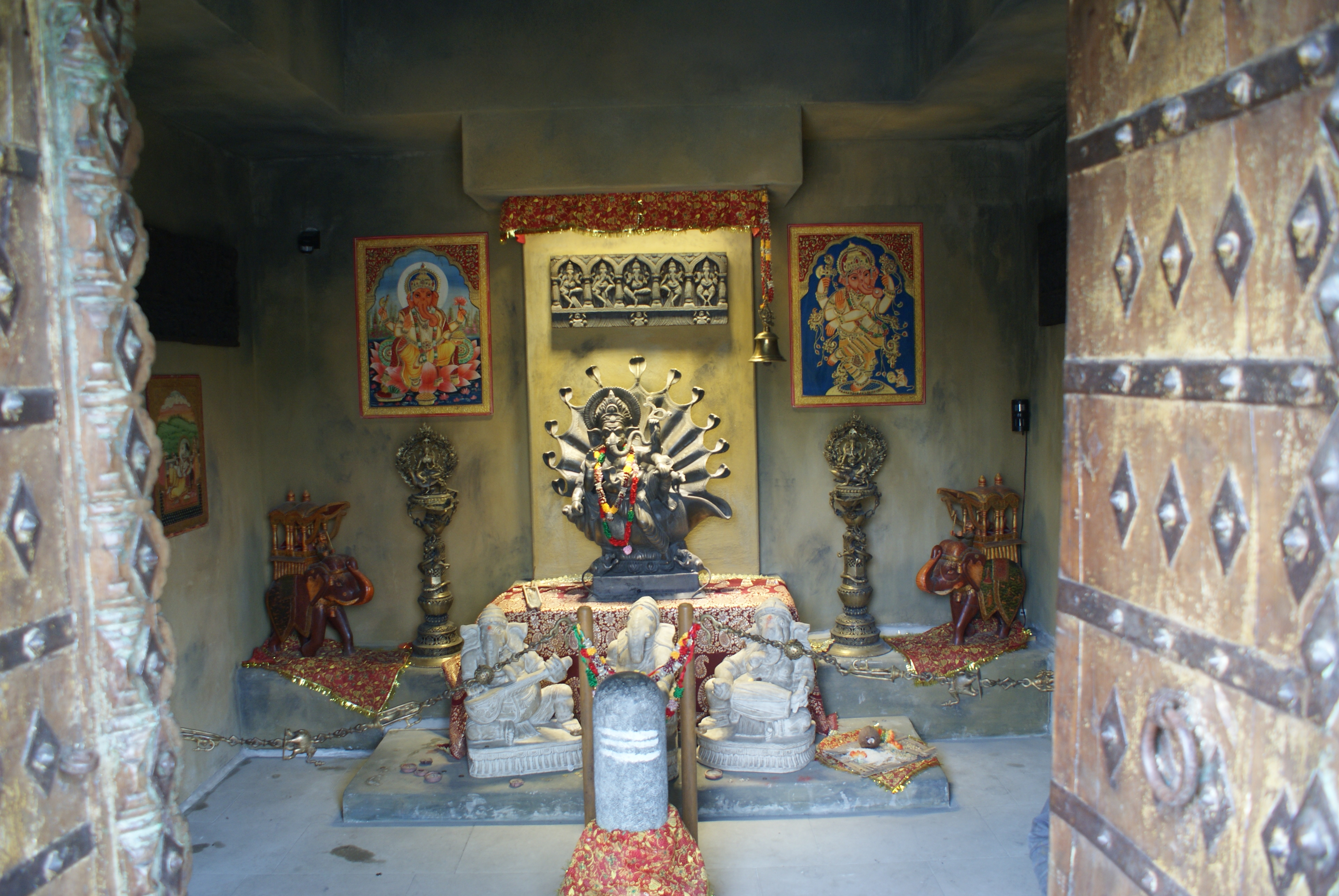
Hindu altar at the Prague Zoo

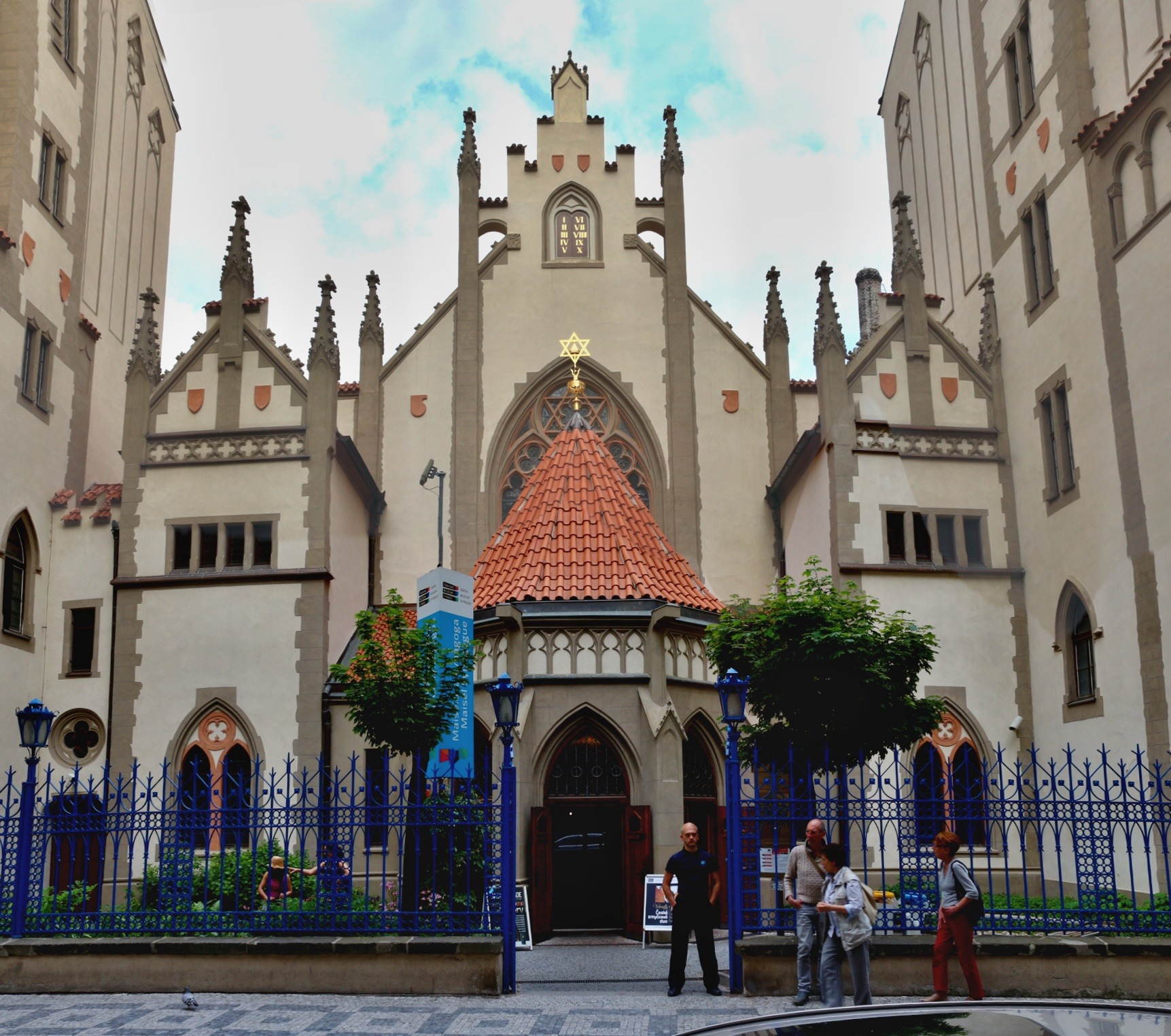
Maisel Synagogue in Prague

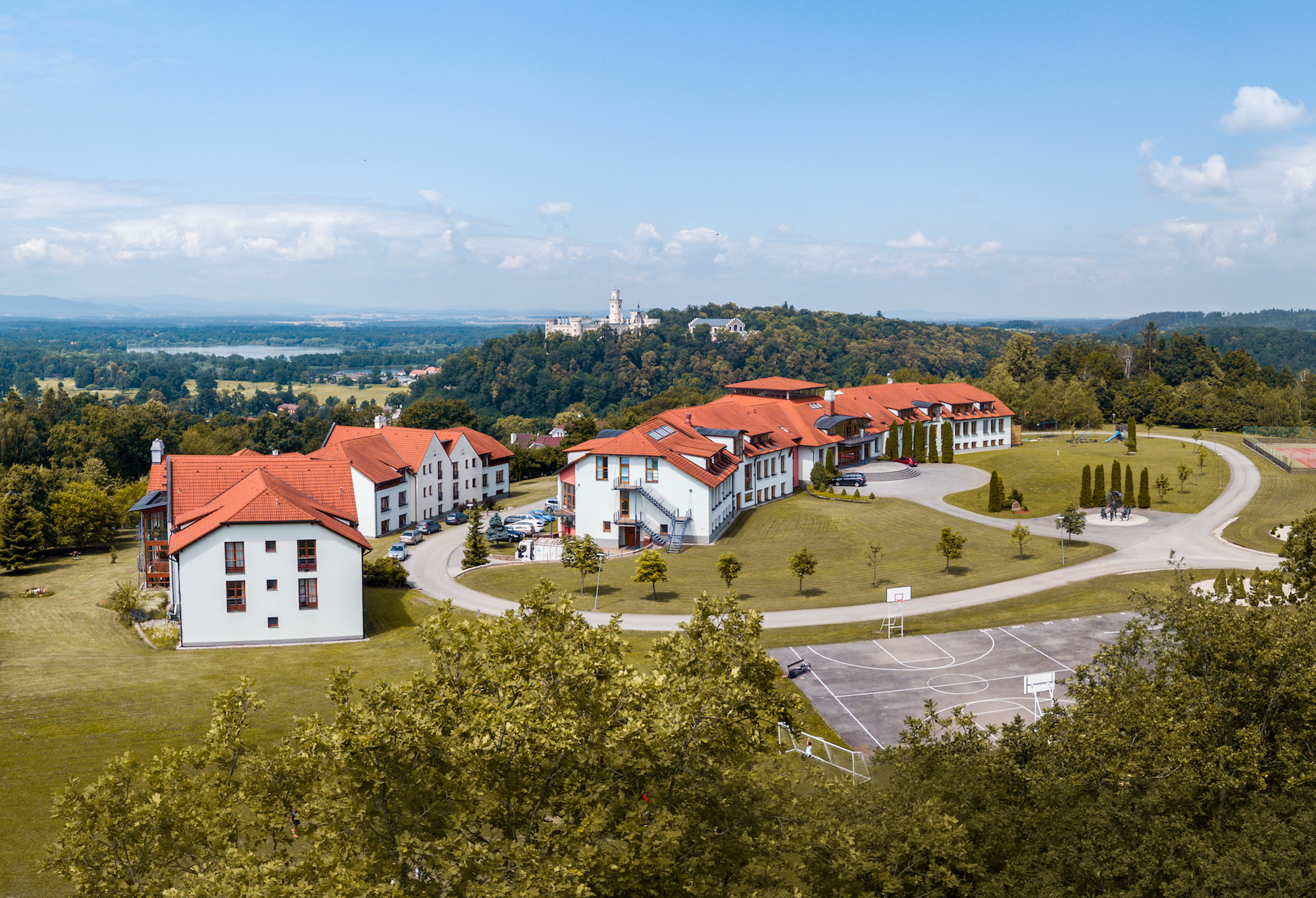
Townshend International School, a Baháʼí school in Hluboká nad Vltavou, South Bohemian Region

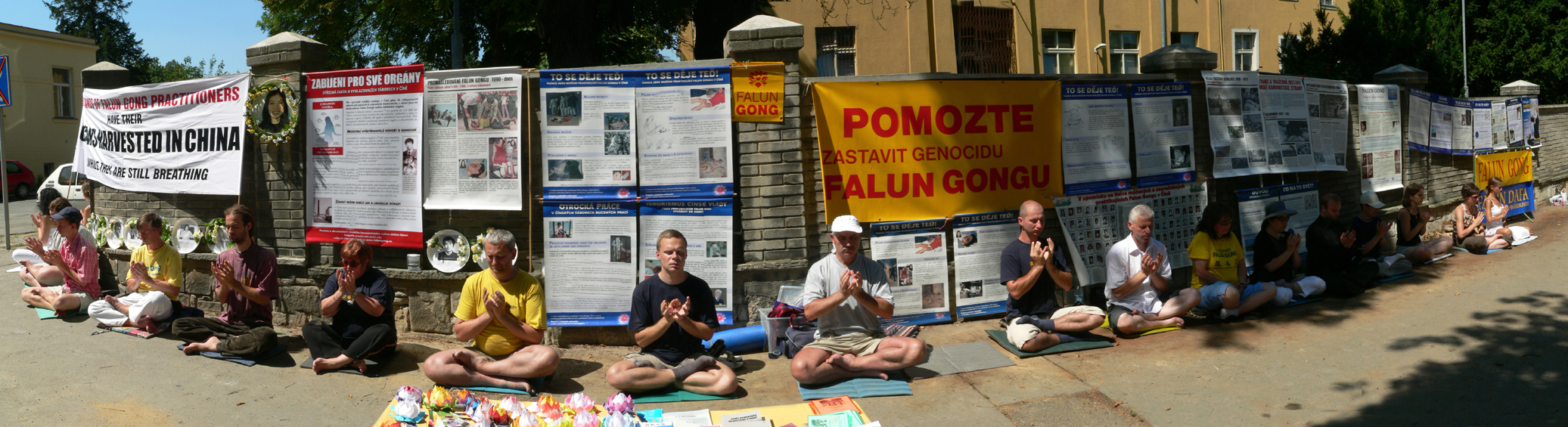
Practitioners of Falun Gong in Prague

== See also ==
- Religion in Slovakia
