= Apostolic Church (Slovakia) =

Denomination in Slovakia

The Apostolic Church in Slovakia (Slovak: Apoštolská cirkev na Slovensku) is a Pentecostal denomination in Slovakia.

It shares much of the history of the Apostolic Church (Czech Republic) until the two countries separated in 1989. Yet, both churches keep a close fellowship and interaction. Pentecostalism came to present Slovak lands in 1927, but only in 1977 did the Pentecostals start to have open meetings, and only in 1989 was the Apostolic Church officially recognized by the Slovak government. Today, the Apostolic Church keeps close fellowship with the Apostolic Church (Czech Republic) and both maintain a Bible school in Kolín, close to Prague.

It has an episcopal polity and 20 congregation with about 1,000 adherents.
