= Josef Zezulka =

Czech philosopher, healer (1912-1992)

- Born: 30 March 1912; Brno, Austria-Hungary
- Died: 13 December 1992 (aged 80)

Philosophical work
- Era: 20. century
- Main interests: biotronics, philosophy, healing, vegetarian
- Notable works: BYTÍ - EXISTENCE - A Philosophy for Life, Přednášky I [Lectures I], Přednášky II [Lectures II]

Josef Zezulka (30 March 1912 – 13 December 1992) was a Czech philosopher, healer and the founder of the discipline of Biotronics. He wrote many philosophical works, best known of which is BYTÍ - EXISTENCE - A Philosophy for Life, which encompasses topics such as the birth of space and its life, evolution of a being, karma, vegetarianism and life energetics.

== Biography ==
Zezulka was born in Brno on 30 March 1912, but lived in Prague for his whole life. He ran a sweet shop before the Second World War. During the war he was involved in the Western resistance, and after the 1948 Czechoslovak coup d'état his sweet shop was confiscated. He worked as an accountant in the National Museum and later, as a result of further persecution, as a museum guard.

His lectures on the philosophy of existence were not favoured by the communist authorities, and took place mostly in private flats. One exception was a speech he gave at the International Congress on Psychotronic Research held in Prague in 1973. His essays were also published in western countries within various publications. His philosophical-religious books were published only after 1989. He died in 1992.

== Josef Zezulka’s Biotronics ==
Founded in Prague during the 1950s by Josef Zezulka, Biotronics is an independent, non-medical discipline of spiritual healing. It uses the realm of biological-vital forces. During a session, a biotronicist apply non-contact treatment, positioning their hands a few centimeters from the patient to transmit vital energy. While remote healing is possible, such treatment is used only in the indicated cases.

In 1968, with the assistance of the Czechoslovak Minister of Health, Vlček, biotronics came close to being incorporated into the national healthcare system, but was interrupted by the August 1968 occupation by the Warsaw Pact allied forces. In 1982 Josef Zezulka conducted research into biotronics treatment in the Vimperk hospital, managed by the Psychoenergetic Laboratory of Professor Kahuda. Josef Zezulka practised his methods mainly in his own flat. He practised healing for more than 40 years.

After 1990, he passed the field on to his successor, Tomáš Pfeiffer, who is its current representative. The field is spreading from the Czech Republic to the entire world with Professional chamber Sanator. The Sanator – the Union of Biotronicists of Josef Zezulka —is an umbrella organization promoting the development of Biotronics and public health in general – see publications. Biotronics, its findings, and research projects are presented at international conferences.

== Publication activities ==
Prior to November 1989 none of his books could be officially published in Czechoslovakia. They have been progressively published since 1990 by the Publishing House Tomáš Pfeiffer - Dimenze 2+2, Praha:

- ZEZULKA Josef, BYTÍ - EXISTENCE - A Philosophy for Life] Dimenze 2+2, 2012,
  - ISBN 978-80-85238-30-3
  - National Library of the Czech Republic https://nkp.knihovny.cz/Record/nkp.NKC01-001828519?sid=13027185&lng=en
- ZEZULKA Josef, Zezulka's Biotronics, Dimenze 2+2
  - ISBN 978-80-85238-37-2
  - National Library of the Czech Republic https://nkp.knihovny.cz/Record/nkp.NKC01-002941152?lng=en&sid=13027213
