= Apostolic Church (Czech Republic) =

The Apostolic Church (Czech: Apoštolská církev) is a Pentecostal denomination in Czech Republic. It is affiliated with the World Assemblies of God Fellowship.

== History ==
Pentecostalism came to northern Moravia before 1910 and spread to Brno, Prague, and other parts of the present-day Czech and Slovak lands. The movement was registered as The Union of Resolved Pentecostal Christians in 1910. The church passed through many difficulties under the Nazi occupation and during the Communist regime, when 1948 it was abolished. Only in 1977 could the Pentecostals establish a new organisation, and so the Apostolic Church was founded in Czechoslovakia. After the separation of Slovakia, the church was officially legalized in 1989 by the Czech Republic government.

== The church today ==
Today, the Apostolic Church keeps close fellowship with its Slovak counterpart and both maintain a Bible school in Kolín, close to Prague.

In 2008 there were nearly 3400 members in 110 communities. The church polity is episcopal. The 2021 census counted 4,958 members.
