= Belarusian Evangelical Reformed Church =

The Belarusian Evangelical Reformed Church is a Protestant church in Belarus.

Reformed presence in the country dates back to the 16th century, with the first Reformed church being founded in Brest-Litovsk in 1553. At the end of the 16th century more than 200 Reformed congregations were in the territory of Belarus. In 1917 a Reformed high school was opened, till the Communist regime a theological school functioned in Koidanava near Minsk. During the Communist rule, church activities were suppressed, and church buildings blown up.

The community started in 1992 to revive the Reformed presence and the church was officially registered in 1996 in Minsk. In 2023, figures show that 2.43% of the country's population is Protestant, but it is unknown how many of these belong to the BERC.

The Apostle Creed, Athanasian Creed and Heidelberg Catechism are the Standards. It is a member of the Communion of Reformed Evangelical Churches and the Joint Eastern European Project.

== See also ==
- Religion in Belarus
- Catholic Church in Belarus
- Freedom of religion in Belarus
