= Buddhism in Belarus =

Buddhism in Belarus is a relatively recent phenomenon with, emerging in a country historically dominated by Christianity, particularly Eastern Orthodoxy. The majority religion in Belarus is Eastern Orthodox Christianity, represented by the Belarusian Orthodox Church, an exarchate of the Russian Orthodox Church.

== See also ==
- Buddhism in the West
- Buddhism in Russia
- Buddhism in Finland
- Religion in Belarus
