= Religion in Belarus =

Religion in Belarus (ARDA 2025)
1. Eastern Orthodoxy (60.1%)
2. Catholicism (15.2%)
3. Other Christians (5.45%)
4. No religion (18.8%)
5. Other religions (0.37%)

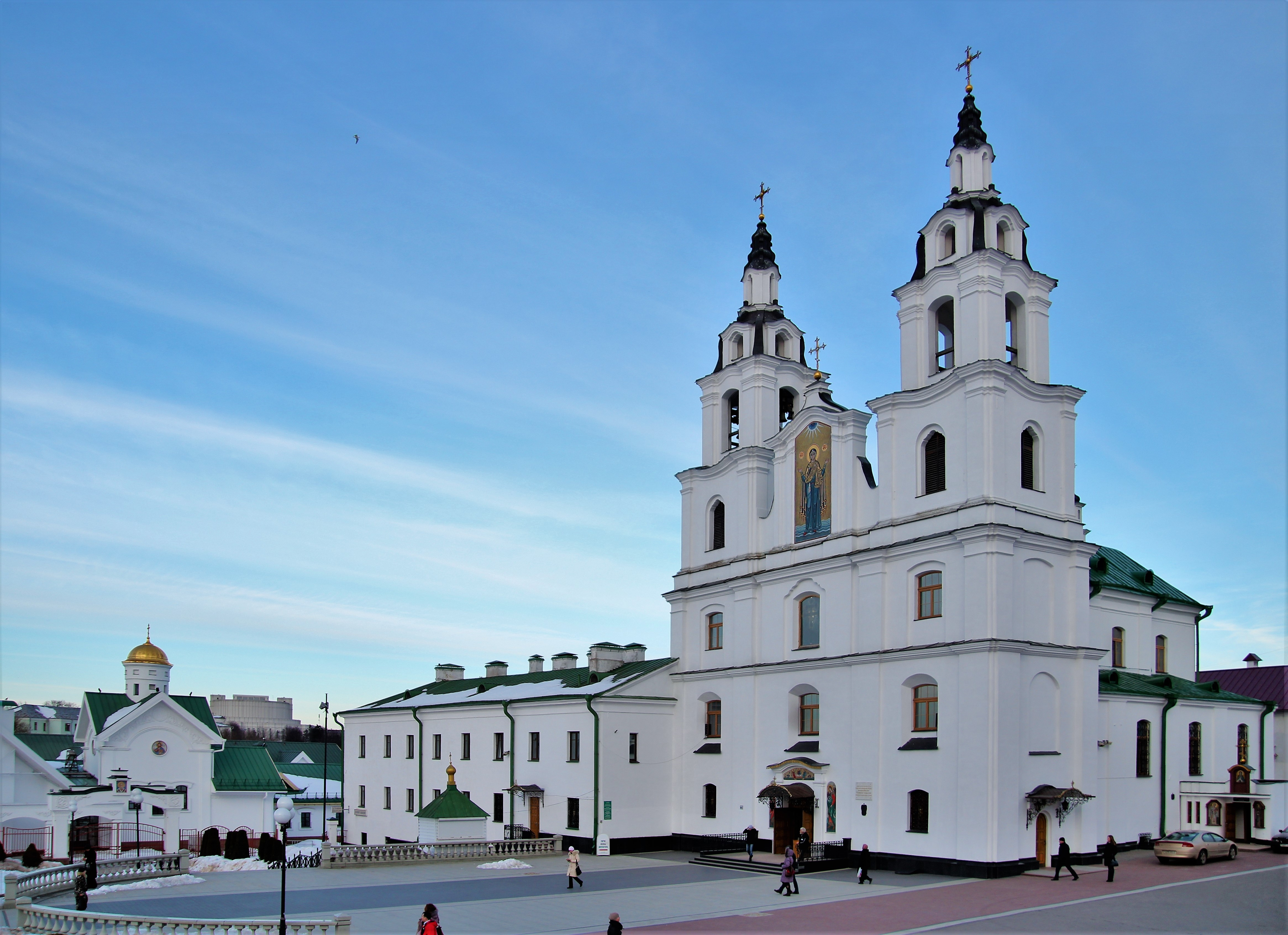
Holy Spirit Cathedral, Minsk (1633–1642), the Belarusian Orthodox Church (former Catholic)

Christianity is the main religion in Belarus, with Eastern Orthodoxy being the largest tradition. The legacy of the state atheism of the Soviet era is apparent in the fact that a proportion of Belarusians (especially in the east part of the country) are not religious. Moreover, other non-traditional and new religions have sprung up in the country after the end of the Soviet Union.

According to the estimations for 2011 by the Ministry of the Interior, 73.3% of the Belarusians are Orthodox Christians, 14.8% are irreligious (atheists and agnostics), 9.7% are Catholics (either Latin Catholic and Belarusian Greek Catholic), and 2.20% are members of other religions (mostly Pentecostals). The Ministry of Foreign Affairs in the same year had 58.9% of Belarusians as believers, 82% of whom were Orthodox, 12% were Catholics, and 6% represented other denominations.

== History ==
By the end of the 12th century, Europe was generally divided into two large areas: Western Europe with dominance of Catholicism, and Eastern Europe with Orthodox and Byzantine influences. The border between them was roughly marked by the Bug River. This placed the area now known as Belarus in a unique position where these two influences mixed and interfered.

Before the 14th century, the Orthodox church was dominant in Belarus. The Union of Krewo in 1385 broke this monopoly and made Catholicism the religion of the ruling class. Władysław II Jagiełło, then ruler of the Grand Duchy of Lithuania, ordered the whole population of Lithuania to convert to Catholicism. The Vilnius episcopate was created one and a half years after the Union of Krewo; it received a lot of land from the Lithuanian dukes. By the mid-16th century, the Catholic Church became strong in Lithuania and in the bordering northwest parts of Belarus, but the Orthodox church was still dominant in Belarus.

In the 16th century, a crisis began in Christianity: the Protestant Reformation began in Catholicism and a period of heresy began in an Orthodox area. From the mid-16th century Protestant ideas began spreading in the Grand Duchy. The first Protestant church in Belarus was created in Brest by Mikołaj Radziwiłł the Black. Protestantism did not survive due to the Counter-Reformation in Poland.

=== Polish—Lithuanian Commonwealth ===
As a result of the Lublin Union of 1569, Belarusian lands, then part of the Grand Duchy of Lithuania, became incorporated into the Polish-Lithuanian Commonwealth, which united the Grand Duchy with the predominantly Catholic Kingdom of Poland. This led to the Brest Union of 1596, which established the Belarusian Greek Catholic Church in the Commonwealth, which brought Orthodox believers in Belarusian territories under the authority of the Pope while preserving their Eastern Rite traditions. This church thus helped preserve the Orthodox ritual as Popes issued numerous edicts prohibiting Greek Catholics from converting to Latin Rite Catholicism.

This conversion was ultimately successful, as by the late 18th century, Greek-rite Catholics constituted 70% of the Belarusian population. Latin-rite Catholics, predominantly from the upper classes, made up 15%; Jews, 7%; and Orthodox, only 6%. Other groups, primarily Protestants, accounted for the remaining 2%.

=== Russian Empire ===
Following the partitions, Russia attempted to convert the local Greek-rite Catholic population to Orthodoxy. By the end of the 18th century, this resulted in the conversion of an estimated 20% of the local Greek Catholic population, approximately 300,000 people, to the Russian Orthodox Church.

In response, Latin Catholics also sought to convert local Greeks to the Latin Rite. Benefiting from the relatively more liberal policies of Emperors Paul I and Alexander I, these efforts led to the conversion of approximately 200,000 Greek-rite Catholics to Latin-rite Catholicism.

The November Uprising of 1830 led to the closure of Catholic monasteries and an intensified campaign to convert the local Greek Catholic population. This effort culminated in the Synod of Polotsk in 1839, which formally abolished the Belarusian Greek Catholic Church. As a result, approximately 1,200,000 (Note: And 300,000 in Ukraine) of its adherents, 99 monasteries, and 2,500 parishes were absorbed into the Russian Orthodox Church.

Following the suppression of the January Uprising, the Russian government intensified its focus on Catholics in the region. Between 1864 and 1868, this policy resulted in approximately 80,000 conversions to Orthodoxy. Consequently, while the Catholic population of the region grew by only 23% between 1858 and 1897, reducing its share to 15%, the Orthodox population simultaneously doubled and constituted 70% of the region's population by 1897.

In 1905, Emperor Nicholas II issued the Edict of Toleration, granting his subjects the freedom to choose their religion. Consequently, approximately 50,000 (Note: Some sources cite a higher figure of 230,000 converts, which includes individuals from Podlachia and Chełm Land, regions that had significant Polish populations. For instance, Minsk Guberniya, with its approximately 2.5 million inhabitants, recorded only 10,000 such conversions.) Orthodox individuals of Greek Catholic background in Belarus converted to Latin-rite Catholicism, a figure that represented less than 1% of the region's total population.

=== Soviet Union ===
Following the October Revolution, the 1918 Soviet Decree on Separation of Church and State stripped the Church of its property. To foster distance from Moscow, the Belarusian Autocephalous Orthodox Metropolia was established in 1922, with the Minsk diocese formally declaring autocephaly in 1927. These actions, combined with the wider Renovationist movement across the USSR, fragmented the Orthodox Church in Belarus. By 1929, of 1,123 Orthodox churches, 424 were controlled by the Russian Orthodox Church, 386 were autocephalous, and 313 were Renovationist.

Soviet anti-religious efforts reduced the number of active churches. By 1932, only 500 remained, with the last closing in the summer of 1939. The German occupation did not oppose their opening, and an easing of persecution under Stalin led to their number increasing to 1,044 in Belarus by 1945.

Khrushchev's religious policies from 1958 to 1964 led to a substantial reduction in Belarus's churches. The republic experienced a 56% loss of its places of worship, compared to Russia's 20% reduction. By 1970, only 380 were active in Belarus. This number held relatively steady, with 369 recorded in 1988 during the state-supported Millennium of the Christianization of Rus' celebration amid Perestroika.

=== Religion in post-Soviet Belarus ===
The revival of religion in Belarus in the post-Soviet era revived the old historical conflict between Orthodoxy and Catholicism. This religious complexity was compounded by the two denominations' links to institutions outside the republic. The Belarusian Orthodox Church was headed by an ethnic Russian, Metropolitan Filaret, who headed an exarchate of the Moscow Patriarchy of the Russian Orthodox Church. The Catholic archdiocese of Belarus was headed by an ethnic Pole, Cardinal Kazimierz Świątek, who had close ties to the church in Poland. However, despite these ties, Archbishop Sviontak, who had been a prisoner in the Soviet camps and a pastor in Pinsk for many years, prohibited the display of Polish national symbols in Catholic churches in Belarus. The current Roman Catholic Archdiocese of Vilnius exists in Belarus now.

Fledgling Belarusian religious movements are having difficulties asserting themselves within these two major religious institutions because of the historical practice of preaching in Russian in the Orthodox churches and in Polish in the Catholic churches. Attempts to introduce the Belarusian language into religious life, including the liturgy, have also not met with wide success because of the cultural predominance of Russians and Poles in their respective churches and the low usage of the Belarusian language in everyday life.

To a certain extent, the 1991 declaration of Belarus's independence and the 1990 law making Belarusian an official language of the republic have generated a new attitude toward the Orthodox and Catholic churches. Some religiously uncommitted young people have turned to the East Catholic Church in reaction to the resistance of the Orthodox and Catholic hierarchies to accepting the Belarusian language as a medium of communication with their flock. Overall, however, national activists have had little success in trying to generate new interest in the Greek Catholic Church.

The Greek Catholic Church, a branch of which existed in Belarus from 1596 to 1839 and had some three-quarters of the Belarusian population as members when it was abolished, is reputed to have used Belarusian in its liturgy and pastoral work. When the church was reestablished in Belarus in the early 1990s, its adherents advertised it as a "national" church. The modest growth of the Greek Catholic Church was accompanied by heated public debates of both a theological and a political character. Because the original allegiance of the Greek Catholic Church was clearly to the Polish–Lithuanian Commonwealth, the reestablished church is viewed by some in the Orthodox Church in Belarus with suspicion, as being a vehicle of both Warsaw and the Vatican and an encouragement of distance from Moscow.

== Demographics by region ==
In 2017 the religious composition of Belarus was estimated to be as follows by the Generations and Gender Survey and the large sample could allow estimating the religious composition at the regional level.

Eastern Orthodoxy is predominant in all over the country, while there is a strong Catholic minority in the western part of the country making up the 6.7% of the total population and the 32.3% of the population in the Grodno Region. Many Catholics in Belarus belong to minority ethnic groups such as Poles (who make up the 3.1% of the total population according to the most recent 2009 Census), but include many ethnic Belarusians as well.

Religious denominations in Belarus, 2017
%	Total Belarus	Brest Region	Vitebsk Region	Gomel Region	Grodno Region	Minsk Region	Mogilev Region	Minsk City
Christians	91.5	96.7	88.2	94.5	96.4	92.5	85.8	87.5
Eastern Orthodoxy	83.3	93.0	79.1	92.3	61.0	86.0	84.5	82.2
Catholicism	6.7	1.8	8.3	0.9	32.3	5.2	0.8	4.0
Protestantism	0.5	0.8	0.2	0.8	0.4	0.3	0.1	0.5
Other Christian denominations	1.0	1.1	0.6	0.5	2.7	1.0	0.4	0.8
No religion	7.8	3.1	11.4	5.0	3.3	6.9	13.1	10.9
Islam	0.2	0	0.2	0.1	0.1	0.3	0.2	0.5
Buddhism	0.1	0.1	0	0	0	0.1	0.2	0.3
Judaism	0.1	0	0.1	0	0	0.1	0.2	0.1
Other religions	0.3	0	0.2	0.1	0.2	0.1	0.6	0.6

== Statistics ==
Before 1917 Belarus had 2,466 religious communities, including: 1,650 Orthodox, 127 Catholic, 657 Jewish, 32 Protestant, and several Muslim communities. Under the communists, the activities of these communities were severely restricted. Many religious communities were destroyed and their leaders exiled or executed; the remaining communities were sometimes co-opted by the government for its own ends, as in the effort to instill patriotism during World War II.

In 1993 one Belarusian publication reported the numbers of religious communities as follows: 787 Orthodox, 305 Catholic, 170 Pentecostal, 141 Baptist, 26 Old Believer, 17 Seventh-Day Adventist, 9 Apostolic Christian, 8 Greek Catholic, 8 New Apostolic, 8 Muslim, 7 Jewish, and 15 other religious groups.

A 2015 Pew Research Center survey based on a sample of 1000 people found that 94% of them declared to be Christians, 3% to be irreligious—a category which includes atheists, agnostics and those who described their religion as "nothing in particular", while 3% belonged to other faiths. The Christians were divided between 73% who declared to be Eastern Orthodox, 12% Catholics, and 9% other Christians.

A 2023 report by the US Department of State, estimated 53% Belarusian Orthodox Church, 6% Roman Catholic, 8% Atheist, 22% Uncertain, and 2% comprised smaller religious groups.

== Religious groups ==
=== Christianity ===
==== Eastern Orthodoxy ====
Although the Russian Orthodox Church was devastated during World War II and continued to decline until the early 1980s because of government policies, it underwent a small revival with the onset of perestroika and the celebration in 1988 of the 1,000- year anniversary of Christianity in Russia. In 1990 Belarus was designated an exarchate of the Russian Orthodox Church, creating the Belarusian Orthodox Church or Belarusian Exarchate of the Russian Orthodox Church. In the early 1990s, 60 percent of the population identified themselves as Orthodox. The church had one seminary, three convents, and one monastery.

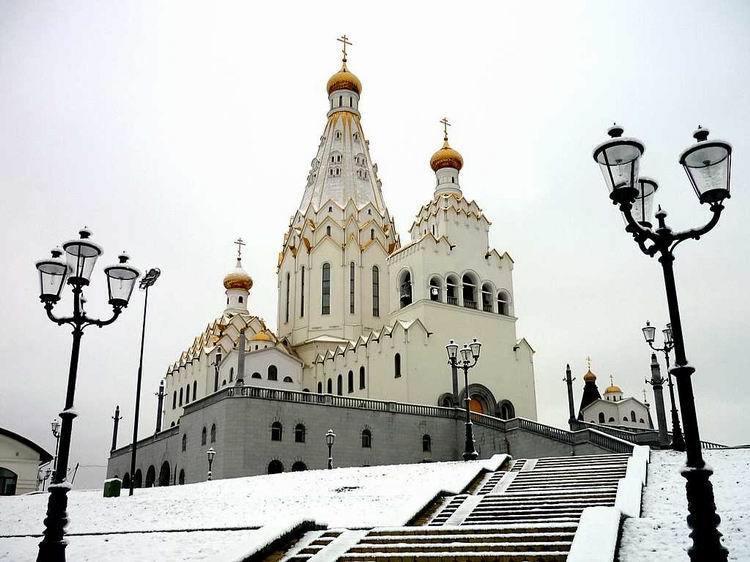
Orthodox Church of All Saints in Minsk

==== Roman Catholicism ====
Soviet policies toward the Roman Catholic Church were strongly influenced by the Catholics' recognition of an outside authority, the pope, as head of the church, as well as by the close historical ties of the church in Belarus with Poland. In 1989 the five official Catholic dioceses, which had existed since World War II and had been without a bishop, were reorganized into five dioceses (covering 455 parishes) and the archdiocese of Minsk and Mahilyow. In the early 1990s, figures for the Catholic population in Belarus ranged from 8 percent to 20 percent; one estimate identified 25 percent of the Catholics as ethnic Poles. The church had one seminary in Belarus.

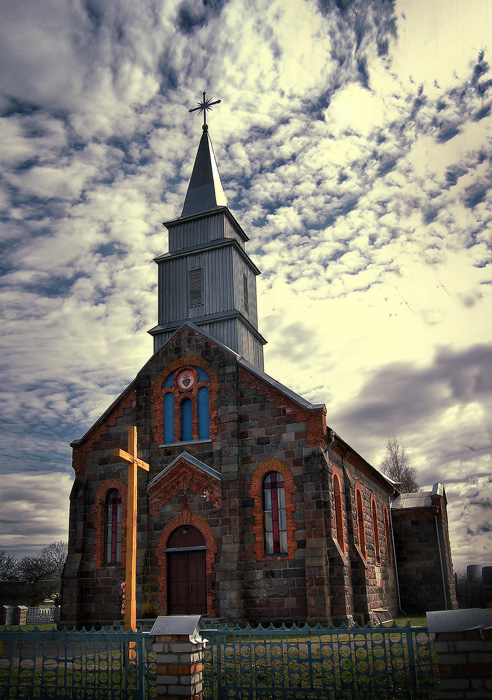
Catholic Church of the Sacred Heart of Jesus in Iĺja

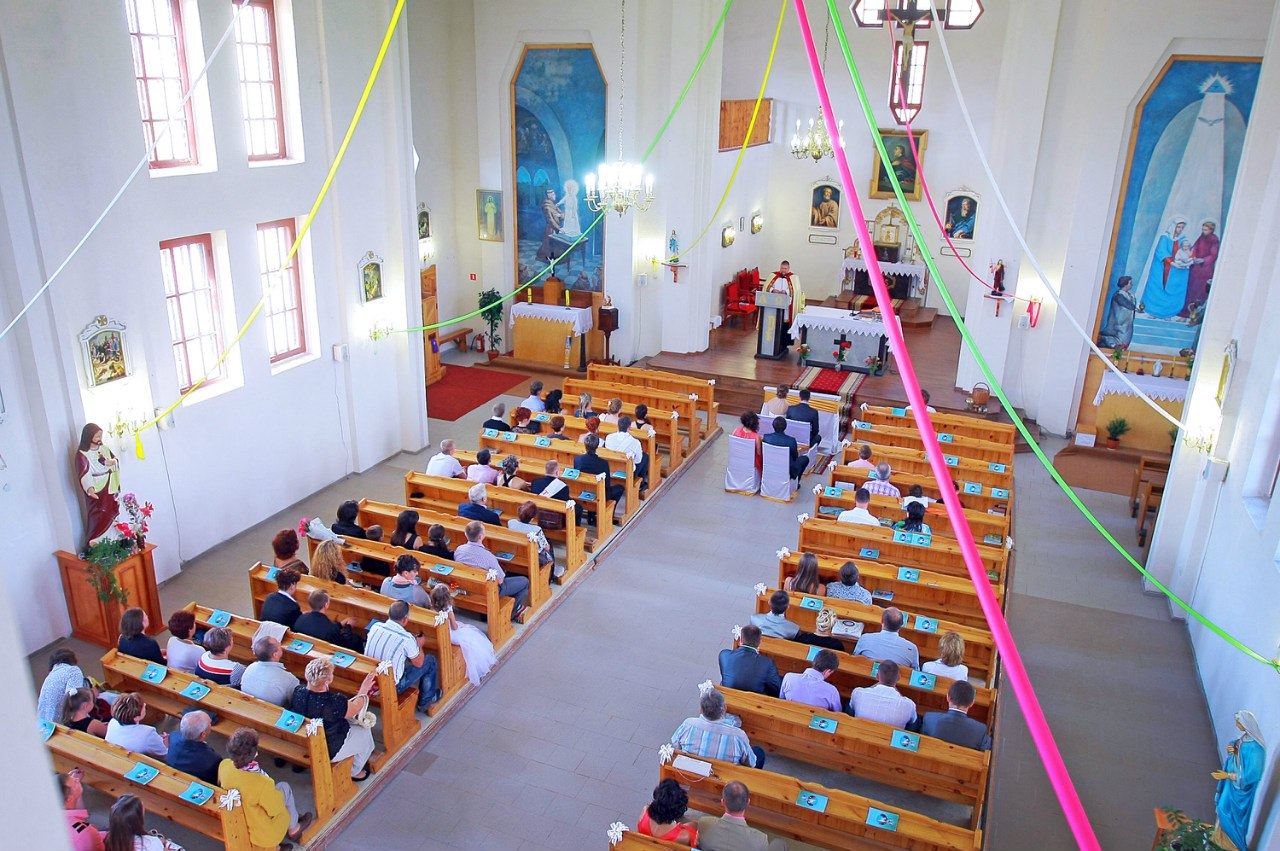
Interior of St. Kaimir Catholic Church in Lahoysk

==== Greek Catholicism ====
At the beginning of 2005, the Belarusian Greek Catholic Church had 20 parishes, of which 13 had obtained state recognition. As of 2003, there have been two Belarusian Greek Catholic parishes in each of the following cities - Minsk, Polatsk and Vitsebsk; and only one in Brest, Hrodna, Mahiliou, Maladziechna and Lida. The faithful permanently attached to these came to about 3,000, while some 4,000 others lived outside the pastoral range of the parishes. Today there are 16 priests, and 9 seminarians. There is a small Studite monastery at Polatsk. The parishes are organized into two deaneries, each headed by an archpriest. The Abbot of the Polatsk monastery serves as the dean of the eastern deanery. There is no eparch (bishop) for the Belarusian Greek Catholic Church. Archimandrite Sergius Gajek, MIC, is the Apostolic Visitator for the Greek-Catholic Church in Belarus. Worship is in the Belarusian language.

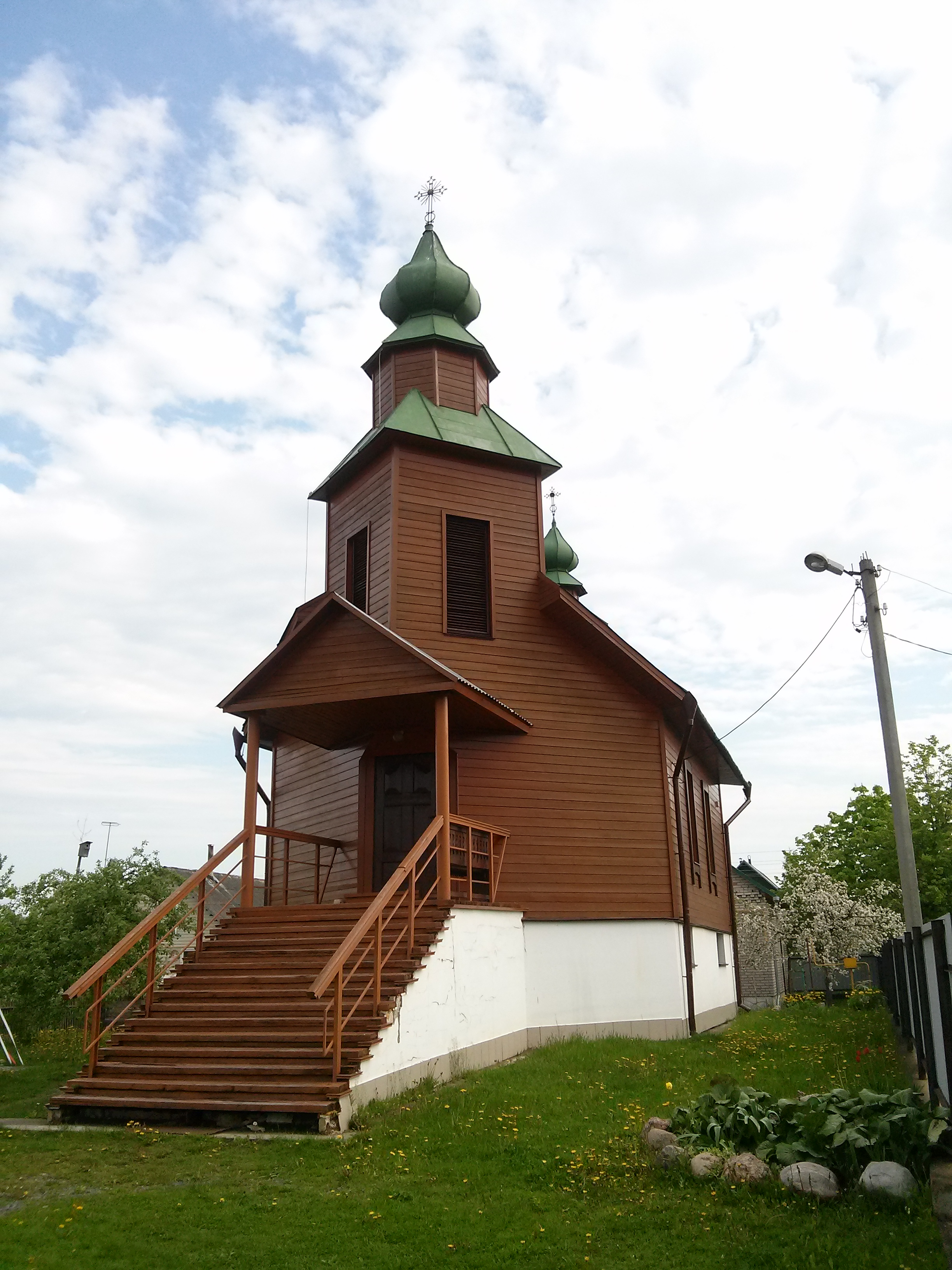
Greek Catholic Church of venerable Paraskieva of Polack in Polotsk

==== Protestantism ====
Before World War II, the number of Protestants in Belarus was quite low in comparison with other Christians, but they have shown growth since then. In 1917, there were 32 Protestant communities. In 1990, there were more than 350 Protestant communities in the country.

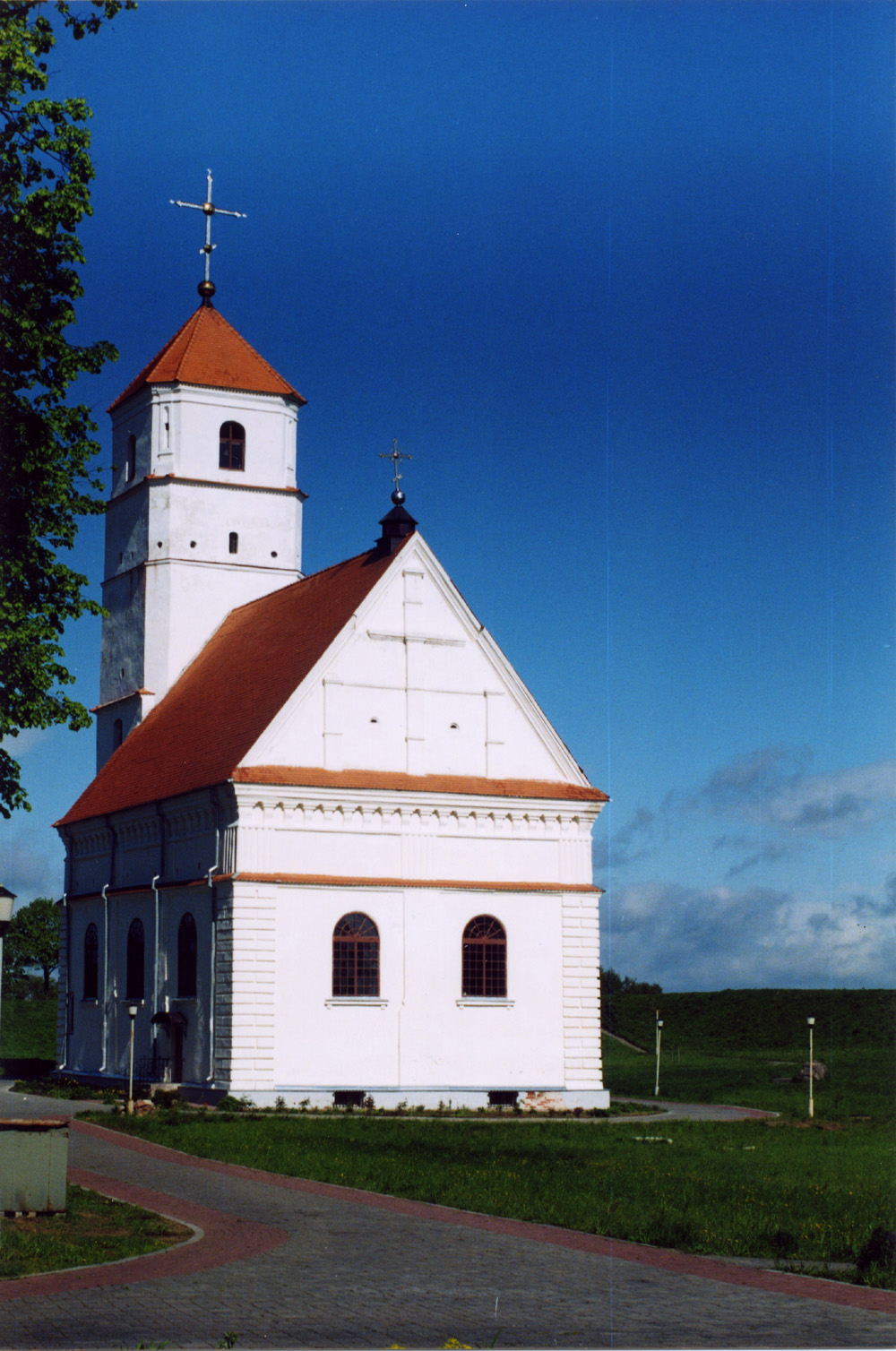
Former Reformed Church in Zaslawye (now Orthodox)

Baptist Church in Maryina Horka

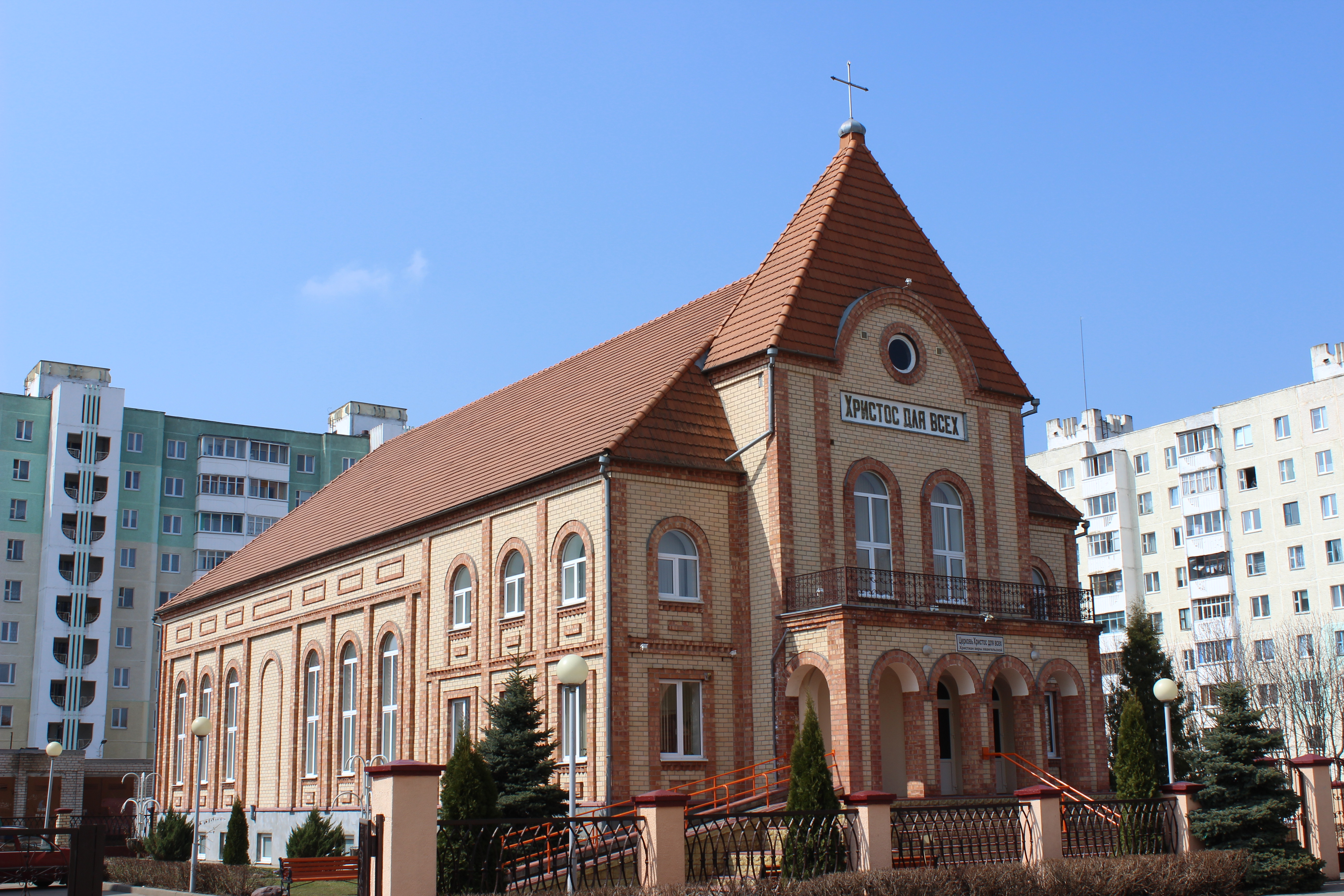
Evangelical Church in Salihorsk

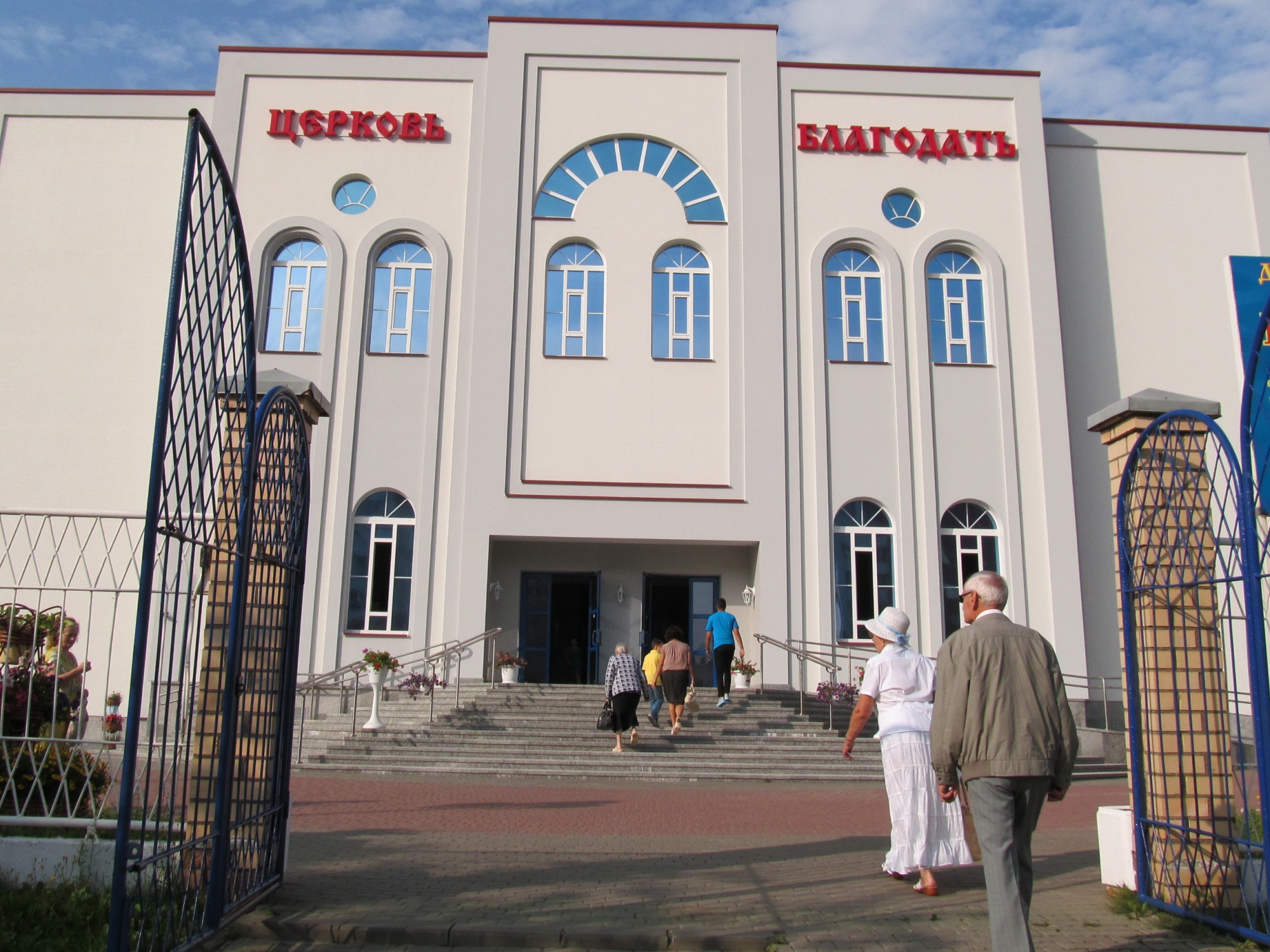
Pentecostal Church of the Grace in Minsk

=== Judaism ===
The first Jewish communities appeared in Belarus at the end of the 14th century and continued to increase until the genocide of World War II. Mainly urban residents, the country's nearly 1.3 million Jews in 1914 accounted for 50 to 60 percent of the population in cities and towns. The Soviet census of 1989 counted some 142,000 Jews, or 1.1 percent of the population, many of whom have since emigrated. Although boundaries of Belarus changed from 1914 to 1922, a significant portion of the decrease was the result of the war. In late 1992, there were nearly seventy Jewish organizations active in Belarus, half of which were country-wide.

=== Islam ===
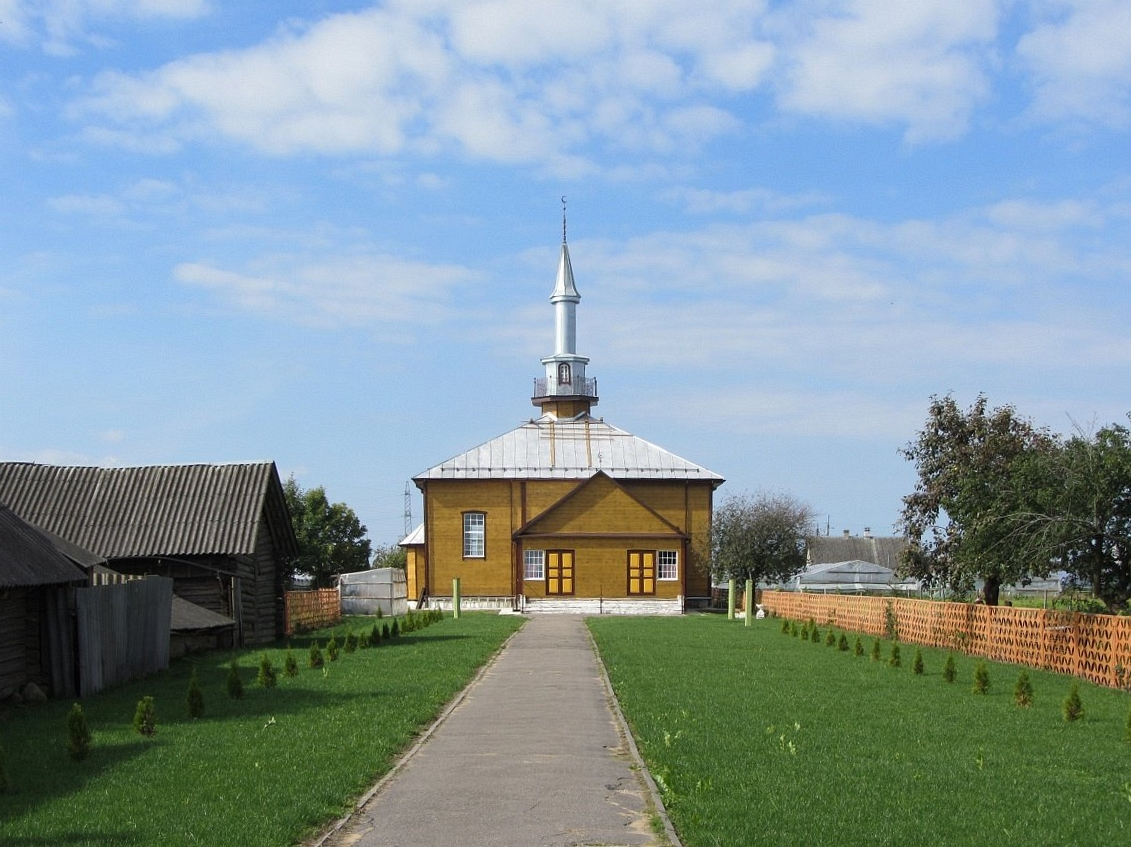
A mosque in Iwye.

Muslims in Belarus are represented by small communities of ethnic Tatars. All of them are followers of Sunni Islam. Some of these Tatars are descendants of emigrants and prisoners of war who settled in Belarus, from the Volga Region, after the 11th century. In 1997 there were 23 Muslim communities, including 19 of those in the Western regions of Belarus.

=== Neopaganism ===
Paganism in Belarus is mostly represented by the Slavic Native Faith, a new religious movement.

== Freedom of religion ==
In 2020, Freedom House rated Belarus' religious freedom as 1 out of 4.

== See also ==
- Belarusian Evangelical Reformed Church
- Belarusian Orthodox Church
- Buddhism in Belarus
- Catholic Church in Belarus
- Freedom of religion in Belarus
- Hinduism in Belarus
