= Freedom of religion in Belarus =

The Constitution of Belarus provides for freedom of religion; however, the Government restricted this right in practice.

The government notes that, “Work continues to protect the different Belarus religious groups and Belarus churches, and to guard against the influence of religious sects.”.

== Overview in 2023 ==
In 2023, there are 9.2 million people living in Belarus. There are 25 registered religious faiths and denominations, encompassing 3,375 religious communities and 175 religious associations, monasteries, missions, brotherhoods, sisterhoods, and schools.

- The Belarusian Orthodox Church has 1,698 religious communities.
- Protestant religious organizations of 14 denominations have 1,037 religious communities.
- The Roman Catholic Church has 499 communities.
- Old Believers have 34 registered communities.
- There are 24 Muslim religious communities (23 Sunni and 1 Shia)
- There are three Jewish religious associations - Orthodox, Chabad-Lubavitch, and Reform Judaism.

Research in 2018 suggested that 27% of Belarusians were ‘highly religious’.

Research in 2017 noted that 73% of Belarusians belong to Orthodox Church, 12% are Catholic and 3% are Muslim.

A survey in 2023 noted that religious groups (with other groups) face restrictions including compulsory state registration, compulsory support of the government regime, planning restrictions for buildings and events, censorship of literature and media, state surveillance and refusal or cancellation of religious visitors’ visas. The survey also noted individual case studies of arrests of religious figures and bans on religious literature for religious prisoners. Much of this is a continuation of previous reports of government suppression.

In 2023, Freedom House rated Belarus’ religious freedom as 1 out of 4.

== Background in the early 21st century ==
Much of the following is informed by the US State Dept 2009 report on International Religious Freedom. A more recent report is available.

Respect for religious freedom has recently worsened. The Government continued to restrict religious freedom in accordance with the provisions of a 2002 law on religion and a 2003 concordat with the Belarusian Orthodox Church (BOC), a branch of the Russian Orthodox Church (ROC) and the only officially recognized Orthodox denomination. Although there is no state religion, the concordat grants the BOC privileged status. Protestants in particular attracted negative attention, presumably for their perceived links with the United States. Numerous antisemitic acts and attacks on religious monuments, buildings, and cemeteries occurred with little discernible response from the Government. Authorities kept many religious communities waiting as long as several years for decisions about property registration or restitution. Authorities also harassed and fined members of certain religious groups, especially those that the authorities appeared to regard as bearers of foreign cultural influence or as having a political agenda. Foreign missionaries, clergy, and humanitarian workers affiliated with churches faced many government-imposed obstacles, including deportation and visa refusal or cancellation.

While some members of society took positive actions to promote religious freedom, instances of societal abuses and discrimination occurred, including numerous acts of vandalism and arson of religious sites, buildings, and memorials.

== Religious demography ==
The country has an area of 207,600 square kilometres (80,200 sq mi) and it had a population of 9,498,400 on 1 January 2016. Historically it has been an area of both interaction and conflict between Belarusian Orthodoxy and Roman Catholicism, although relations between the two groups improved during the period covered by this report. January 2007 figures from the Office of the Plenipotentiary Representative for Religious and Nationality Affairs (OPRRNA) showed that approximately 50% of Belarusians consider themselves religious. The Government claimed that of persons professing a religious faith, approximately 80% belong to the BOC, 14% identify themselves with the Catholic Church, 4% are members of eastern religious groups (including Muslims, Hare Krishnas, and Baha'i), and 2% are Protestant (including Seventh-day Adventists, Old Believers, Jehovah's Witnesses, Apostolic Christians, and Lutherans). Of those who identify themselves as Belarusian Orthodox or Roman Catholic, only 18% and 50%, respectively, regularly attend religious services. There are also adherents of the Greek Catholic Church and of Orthodox groups other than the BOC. Jewish groups claimed that between 50,000 and 70,000 persons identify themselves as Jewish. Most Jews were not religiously active.

In January 2007 OPRRNA reported 3,103 religious organizations of 25 religious confessions and denominations in the country, including 2,953 registered religious communities and 150 national and confessional organizations (monasteries, brotherhoods, missionaries, etc.). This included 1,399 Belarusian Orthodox, 493 Evangelical Christian, 440 Roman Catholic, 267 Evangelical Christian Baptist, 74 Seventh-day Adventist, 54 Full Gospel Christians, 33 Old Believer, 29 Jewish, 27 Lutheran, 26 Jehovah's Witness, 24 Muslim, 21 New Apostolic Church, 17 Progressive Judaism, 13 Greek Catholic, 9 Apostolic Christians, 6 Hare Krishnas, 5 Baha'i, 5 Christ's Church, 4 Mormon, 2 Messianic, 1 Reform Church, 1 Presbyterian, 1 Armenian Apostolic, 1 Latin Catholic, and 1 St. Jogan Church communities.

Foreign clergy and missionaries attempted to operate in the country but were subject to deportation and visa refusal or cancellation.

== Status of religious freedom ==
=== Legal and policy framework ===
The Constitution provides for freedom of religion; however, the Government restricted this right in practice. Although the 1996 amended Constitution affirms the equality of religions and denominations before the law, it also contains restrictive language stipulating that cooperation between the state and religious organizations "is regulated with regard for their influence on the formation of spiritual, cultural, and state traditions of the Belarusian people." OPRRNA regulates all religious matters.

In 2002 President Lukashenko signed a religion law despite protests from human rights organizations, the European Union, and domestic religious groups. The law recognizes the "determining role of the Orthodox Church in the historical formation and development of spiritual, cultural, and state traditions of the Belarusian people" as well as the historical importance of Catholicism, Judaism, Islam, and Evangelical Lutheranism, groups commonly referred to as "traditional faiths." However, the traditional faiths mentioned by the law do not include religious groups such as the Calvinist church which was common amongst the nobility from the 16th century on and Priestless Old Believers and which have historical roots in the country dating to the 17th century.

Despite the law's guarantee of religious freedom, it contains a number of restrictive elements that increase the Government's control of the activities of religious groups. The law requires all religious groups to receive prior governmental approval to import and distribute literature, prevents foreigners from leading religious organizations, and denies religious communities the right to establish schools to train their own clergy. In addition, the law confines the activity of religious communities to areas where they are registered and establishes complex registration requirements that some communities, both "traditional" and "nontraditional," have difficulty fulfilling. The law also required all previously registered groups to reregister by 2004 and bans all religious activity by unregistered groups.

The religion law establishes three tiers of religious groups: religious communities, religious associations, and republican religious associations. Religious communities, or local individual religious organizations, must include at least 20 persons over the age of 18 who live in neighboring areas. Religious associations must include at least 10 religious communities, one of which must have been active in the country for at least 20 years, and may be constituted only by a republican (national level) religious association. Republican religious associations can be formed only when there are active religious communities in the majority of the country's six regions.

A religious community must submit a list of its founders' names, places of residence, citizenship, and signatures, along with copies of its founding statutes, minutes of its founding meeting, and permission from the regional authorities confirming the community's right to occupy or use any property indicated in its founding statutes. Regional executive committees (for groups outside of Minsk) or the Minsk City Executive Committee handle all registration applications. For a community practicing a religion not previously "known" to the Government, information about the faith must also be submitted. No previously "unknown" religious communities were registered during the reporting period.

A religious association must provide a list of members of the managing body with biographical information, proof of permission for the association to be at its designated location, and minutes from its founding congress. Religious associations have the exclusive right to establish religious educational institutions, invite foreigners to work with religious groups, and organize cloistered and monastic communities. All applications to establish associations and republican associations must be submitted to OPRRNA. The Government registered five republican religious organizations during the reporting period. Domestic religious groups continued to call for revocation of at least part of the 2002 law. Christian communities maintained that the law heavily restricts their activities, suppresses freedom of religion, and legalizes criminal prosecution of individuals for their religious beliefs.

The 2003 concordat between the BOC and the Government guarantees the BOC autonomy in its internal affairs, freedom to perform religious rites and other activities, and a special relationship with the state. The concordat recognizes the BOC's "influence on the formation of spiritual, cultural, and national traditions of the Belarusian people." It calls for the Government and the BOC to cooperate in implementing policy in various fields, including education, development and protection of cultural legacies, and security. Although it states that the agreement would not limit the religious freedoms of other religious groups, the concordat calls for the Government and the BOC to combat unnamed "pseudoreligious structures that present a danger to individuals and society." In addition, the BOC possesses the exclusive right to use the word "Orthodox" in its title and to use the image of the Cross of Euphrosynia, the patron saint of the country, as its symbol.

On January 8, 2007, President Lukashenko honored several BOC members with "For Spiritual Revival" awards in recognition of their efforts to develop "moral traditions which contribute to the spiritual values…between various nationalities and religions." In a meeting with BOC bishops on December 21, 2006, President Lukashenko praised the cooperation between the Government and the BOC and stressed their common goals of civil accord and national unity. The President also noted the Government's assistance to the BOC: in 2006 the Government-funded $3 million (6.4 billion rubles) in BOC projects.

=== Restrictions on religious freedom ===
The Government restricted religious freedom both actively and indirectly. The Government enforced laws that limit freedom of worship, speech, and assembly. The Government was sometimes responsible for and regularly failed to condemn acts of religious insensitivity or intolerance. The Government frequently referred to groups it did not consider to be traditional as "nontraditional," and government officials and state media widely used the term "sect" when referring to such groups, although it is not an official designation. Foreign missionaries, clergy, and charity workers faced increased government obstacles, including deportation and visa refusal or revocation. With or without official registration, some religious groups encountered difficulty renting or purchasing property to establish places of worship, building churches, or reacquiring state-controlled religious property. The Ahmadiyya Muslim Community is banned in Belarus.

Forum 18 reported that the BOC and government officials pressured the parishioners of the unregistered Russian Orthodox Church Abroad (ROCA), which split from the BOC in 1927, to withdraw their names from the ROCA's registration application. If even 1 of the 20 signatories of the application were to withdraw his or her name, ROCA would be forced to start the process again. ROCA stated that from August to October 2006, two Moscow Patriarchate priests threatened to withhold sacraments from the parishioners if they continued supporting the "illegal and uncanonical sect." ROCA claimed that the two priests received the parishioners' names from local authorities.

On September 14, 2006, Pastor Sergei Heil, chair of the unregistered Independent Evangelical-Lutheran Church in the Republic of Belarus, reported that the Government refused to register it as a republic-wide association. The Church has tried since October 2004 to register as an association and held four founding sessions in Bobruysk to comply with the registration requirements. OPRRNA maintained that there were "technical errors" in its application.

Many "traditional" and "nontraditional" religious groups continued to experience problems obtaining property or registering property, particularly when attempting to convert residential property for religious use. According to the Government, the law permits residential property to be used for religious services only after it has been converted from residential use. The housing code permits the use of such property for nonresidential purposes with the permission of local executive and administrative bodies. As a result, several Protestant churches and "nontraditional" groups were at an impasse: denied permission to convert their properties for religious use because they were not registered, but unable to register due to the lack of a legal address. Such groups often were forced to meet illegally or in the homes of individual members.

On March 22, 2007, the Supreme Economic Court adjourned indefinitely a case involving the New Life Church in Minsk. The New Life Church faced closure because authorities refused to register it at the cow barn it owned and wished to use for worship; its unregistered status made all its activities illegal. To protest a July 24, 2006, order by the Minsk City Economic Court to sell the church building to the city at a price far below market value and to vacate the premises by October 8, 2006, New Life Church members and sympathizers began a 23-day hunger strike, which prompted the authorities to review their decision. With the permission of Minsk local authorities, approximately 700 New Life Church parishioners and supporters rallied on Bangalore Square on October 21, 2006, to protest the forced sale. The case remained under consideration at the end of the reporting period.

On December 6, 2006, Grodno authorities granted permission for the Blessed Virgin Mary Mother of Mercy Roman Catholic community to build a church for its 8,000-member parish, which had been worshipping in a small wooden house that could accommodate only 300 persons. Twelve members of the church had launched a hunger strike on December 1, 2006, and continued it until authorities agreed to their request. The community first applied for permission to build a church in 1998.

On December 4, 2006, the Minsk Community of Krishna Consciousness (the Hare Krishnas) was forced out of its office in a vehicle service station following an inspection by the sanitary and emergency management authorities. The inspectors, however, allowed all other tenants to remain. The Minsk and Bobruysk Hare Krishna communities had searched for a legal address since being denied registration in 2004. They had attempted to register at the vehicle service station, but in November 2006 authorities denied the application.

On July 15, 2006, the Supreme Court rejected the appeal of Pastor Georgiy Vyazovskiy against the closure of his Christ Covenant Reformed Baptist Church. The Minsk City Court closed the church in May 2006 because the congregation had attempted to register at a residential building in violation of the law's mandate that all religious groups be registered at a "legal" address.

A government decree specifies measures to ensure public order and safety during general public gatherings. Some meeting hall officials cited the decree as a basis for canceling or refusing to extend agreements with religious groups for the use of their facilities. During the reporting period it remained difficult, particularly for unregistered groups, to rent a public facility. Protestant communities suffered most from this decree, since they were less likely to own their own property and needed to rent public space when their members were too numerous to meet in private homes.

On June 25, 2007, the Minsk Tsentralniy District informed John the Baptist Church that it could not rent space at the state Trade Unions House, allegedly due to scheduling conflicts.

Between February 2006 and the end of the reporting period, the charismatic Living Word Church in Grodno tried at least seven times to rent meeting space, but state proprietors refused each attempt.

On December 28, 2006, State Ideology Officer Oleg Bobryk interrupted without explanation a seminar on family relationships held by a Protestant preacher at the Volozhyn Palace of Culture. Volozhyn authorities dismissed 15 Palace of Culture employees that same day. Vefil Evangelical Christian Baptist Pastor Sergey Yasku alleged the dismissals were an attempt by government officials to "eliminate any cooperation of evangelical Christians with public organizations."

The Government restricted peaceful assembly for religious activities during the reporting period. On June 4, 2007, the Minsk City Executive Committee denied permission for the unregistered Belarus Christian Democracy party (BCD) to stage a June 8 rally protesting authorities' crackdown on freedom of conscience on Freedom Square. In April 2007 authorities similarly denied the BCD permission to stage a rally in support of religious freedom.

There were credible reports that local authorities and teachers sought to identify which children attended Baptist Sunday school. According to Forum 18, Baptist pastor Gennady Brutskiy alleged that children identified as having attended Baptist Sunday school were threatened by the head teacher. Similarly, Pastor Yasku claimed State Ideology Officer Bobryk demanded that teachers find out whether their students attended Protestant Sunday school. If children attended such a school, the teachers had to "have a talk" with their parents.

During the reporting period, the Government monitored peaceful minority religious groups, especially those perceived as "foreign" or "cults." Credible sources reported that state security officers often attended Protestant services to conduct surveillance.

Approval for visits by foreign religious workers often involved a lengthy bureaucratic process. The law requires 1-year, multiple-entry "spiritual activities" visas for foreign missionaries and clergy. An organization inviting foreign clergy must make a written request to OPRRNA, including the proposed dates and reason for the requested visit. Even if the visit is for nonreligious purposes such as charitable activities, representatives must obtain a visa and permission from OPRRNA. OPRRNA has 20 days in which to respond, and there is no provision for appeal of its decision.

Observers expressed concern that lack of uniform government guidance on implementation of February 2006 changes to visa laws affected the ability of missionaries to live and work in the country. Authorities frequently questioned foreign missionaries and humanitarian workers and the local citizens who worked with them about the sources and use of their funding. There were also credible reports that these foreign workers were followed and surveilled by security personnel.

According to Forum 18, in September 2006 authorities refused Israeli citizen Rabbi Boruch Lamdan permission to conduct religious activity due to his alleged "illegal commercial activity," although he was allowed to remain in the country. Rabbi Lamdan denied the allegations, stating that the refusal stemmed from his late tax payments on charitable donations that were sent to him personally. Lamdan departed the country in June 2007 after the Government did not renew his religious visa.

In July 2006 authorities denied permission for the unregistered Full Gospel Union to invite Nigerian pastor Anselm Madubuko to preach at three New Generation member churches. The authorities claimed that the group had "no basis" to invite him since it is unregistered and noted that they considered Madubuko's visit "inexpedient" given the New Generation's alleged "violation of Belarusian law."

The Government does not permit foreign missionaries to engage in religious activity outside of their host institutions. Transferring between religious organizations, including parishes, requires prior state permission. For example, on October 13, 2006, authorities fined Polish citizen and Catholic priest Antoni Koczko $29 (62,000 rubles) for conducting an "unauthorized" religious service in Minsk, since he had been assigned to a church in Slutsk.

Internal affairs agencies may compel the departure of foreign clergy by denying registrations and stay permits. Authorities may act independently or based on recommendations from other government entities.

In spring 2007 the founder/pastor of the Minsk-based New Testament Church and pastor of its Messianic Jewish congregation, an American citizen who had worked in the country for 10 years, was forced to leave the country. Authorities had refused to renew his work permit in spring 2006. In October 2006 authorities refused to renew visas for 12 Polish Catholic nuns and priests from the Grodno region who had been working in the country for more than 10 years, citing the need to provide local graduates of the Catholic seminaries with jobs. Despite hunger strikes, petitions, and protests by the Catholic community, the priests and nuns were told to leave the country by December 31, 2006.

Legislation prohibits "subversive activities" by foreign organizations and the establishment of offices by foreign organizations whose activities incite "national, religious, and racial enmity" or could "have negative effects on the physical and mental health of the people." On May 30, 2007, authorities fined Polish citizen Yaroslav Lukasik, an unofficial pastor of the John the Baptist Church, $15 (31,000 rubles) for conducting unauthorized religious services at a fellow pastor's home on May 27. At the same time, they issued him deportation papers for "repeated violations of the regime governing the presence of foreigners," ordered him to leave the country by June 7, and barred him from re-entry for five years. Lukasik denied the charges, stating that he had attended, not conducted, religious services on May 27. On May 8, 2007, authorities canceled Lukasik's residency permit due to his alleged involvement in "activities aimed at causing damage to the national security." Lukasik appealed the fine and the deportation order to the local court, but the court denied the appeals on June 20 and June 27, respectively. Lukasik is married to a local citizen and has three local citizen children. Independent media reported that his family also appealed to a higher court in Minsk; however, authorities alleged that the papers related to the case were "lost" and could not be found before the statute of limitations for the appeal expired.

Foreign citizens officially in the country for nonreligious work can be reprimanded or expelled if they participate in religious activities.

On June 21, 2007, a Mogilyov judge overturned penalties involving seven U.S. citizens due to technical errors and sent the case back for a retrial. On February 16, 2007, the Government had deported the seven and banned them from the country for two years for two separate counts of illegal teaching and illegal religious activities. On February 13, the police charged the group with violating article 185 of the administrative code, "Violation of Rules of Foreign Citizens' Stay in Belarus" and fined them $15 (32,000 rubles) each for engaging in activities incompatible with the terms of their visas; according to the Government, the seven failed to obtain prior permission from the Education Ministry before they began teaching English at a house of worship in Mogilyov. The charges stemmed from a February 9 police raid on a church building; the results of the retrial were pending at the end of the reporting period.

On March 14, 2007, authorities canceled the residency permit of a U.S. Protestant humanitarian aid worker and deported him. Authorities claimed he was involved in activities "aimed at causing damage to national security" without explaining the alleged threat. The man had served as a charity worker and attended a Protestant church in Minsk.

Baptist Union representative Gennadiy Brutskiy reported that authorities questioned a U.S. citizen who held a humanitarian work visa after he addressed a Bible college graduation ceremony in May 2006. In March 2007 authorities refused to renew the man's visa, forcing him to leave the country.

By law, citizens are not prohibited from proselytizing and may speak freely about their religious beliefs; however, in practice authorities often interfered with or punished some individuals who proselytized on behalf of registered or unregistered religious groups. Authorities regulated every aspect of proselytizing and literature distribution.

The Government continued to harass and fine Hare Krishnas for illegally distributing religious literature. In January 2007 authorities confiscated 14 books from a Hare Krishna and fined the person $15 (32,000 rubles) for illegally distributing religious material.

On June 12, 2007, police removed a sign that read "I have the right to faith" from a bridge in downtown Minsk within 90 minutes of its placement thereby opposition activists.

The Government continued to use textbooks that promoted religious intolerance, especially toward "nontraditional" faiths. Leaders of Protestant communities criticized language in the textbook Basics of Home and Personal Security as discriminatory against Protestants, particularly the chapter entitled "Beware of Sects." The chapter includes a paragraph informing students of such "sects" as Seventh-day Adventists, the Church of Maria, White Brotherhood, and Jehovah's Witnesses. The Ministry of Education continued to use the textbook Man, Society, and State, which labels Protestants and Hare Krishnas as "sects," even after protests by religious groups. The authorities promised to change the language in the next edition of the books; neither book was republished by the end of the period covered by this report.

During the reporting period, the Government took steps to "warn" the public of "new" groups and discouraged their growth. On June 15, 2007, the state newspaper Respublika published an article titled "New Crusaders" which compared contemporary Catholic missionary activities to the Crusades and characterized the involvement of Pope John Paul II in the fall of communism as a "devilish enterprise," alleging collaboration with the CIA. The Polish community in the country denounced the article and called for criminal charges against its author and the newspaper's editor. Respublika later issued an apology. On December 12, 2006, Respublika urged government authorities to treat "new" religions with extreme caution because they might lead to tragedy and pose threats to society. The author alleged that new religions, including Scientology, Kabbalah, and Buddhism, are syncretic and do not teach their followers "anything good."

On May 21, 2007, God's Grace Head Pastor Sergey Khomich received a letter from the state-controlled Lad television channel denying any wrongdoing in a May 12 broadcast in which a television host referred to the God's Grace community as a "totalitarian and destructive sect." While broadcasting footage of a God's Grace prayer service and a conference, host Artyom Makhakeyev accused healers of swindling money out of sick people and warned that the wealthy "frequently become the focus of sects' attention."

On December 8, 2006, the Government informed the New Life Church that it would not initiate a case against state-controlled Capital TV (STV). On October 14 and 15, 2006, STV made slanderous allegations against the unregistered Protestant group in a report entitled "Strange Worshippers of a No Less Strange Religion." When STV would not retract its allegations, the New Life Church asked the authorities to open a criminal case against STV and to refute the station's allegations. The Government refused on the grounds that "there was no sign of any crime in their actions."

Despite the BOC's favored status, the Government also warned about the "excessive influence" of the BOC. President Lukashenko met with senior BOC bishops on December 21, 2006, to explain his "pragmatic" approach to the BOC after it complained about an article in a state newspaper by a presidential administration official that warned citizens against the BOC's influence and claimed that it weakens the impact of state ideology.

There were credible reports of government interference with religious travel. The Belarus-based Christian Human Rights House reported that on January 3, 2007, authorities stopped and searched a bus carrying approximately 40 young Catholics and Protestants at the Belarus-Poland border for approximately 5 hours. The group was returning to Belarus after a pilgrimage to Croatia.

On August 9, 2006, border guards took into custody and transported to Minsk 47 Baptist children and adults who were on a religious retreat at a private homestead in the western Grodno region for alleged violations of health and safety regulations. The previous day, local authorities had ordered the gathering to disperse and threatened to take the children to a police facility for juvenile delinquents and abandoned children. After their release, a senior Minsk religious affairs official publicly conceded that the retreat was legal since private individuals had organized the event. According to Forum 18, different government departments conducted up to four daily checks on a Baptist summer youth camp in the Brest region.

Limited restitution of religious property occurred during the reporting period. There is no legal basis for restitution of property seized during the Soviet and Nazi occupations, and the law restricts the restitution of property being used for cultural or educational purposes. The Government did not return buildings if it had nowhere to move the current occupants. For example, most of the Jewish community's past requests for the return of Minsk synagogues, which were in use as theaters, museums, sports complexes, and a beer hall, were refused. However, during the reporting period Jewish communities did not request the return of buildings or other real estate.

On November 28, 2006, local authorities in Volozhyn threatened to rescind the Jewish community's rights to possess a restituted yeshiva building due to lack of renovation work. The Jewish community had started renovations on the yeshiva, which had been returned to the community in the 1990s, but ran out of funds before completing them. The authorities ultimately did not confiscate the 200-year-old building after a U.S.-based committee pledged in May 2007 to raise funds to finance the renovation.

At the end of the reporting period, the St. Joseph Catholic community in Minsk continued a campaign for the Government to return former Bernardine church and monastery buildings, home to the state archives and slated to be converted into a hotel and entertainment center. The community has held regular prayer services at the site since first learning of reconstruction plans in 2004, but in March 2007 the Government announced new conversion plans, after which the community launched the petition drive. As of June 4, 2007, the petition had more than 10,000 signatures. Previously, the OPRRNA chairman said that since the Government did not have funds to construct new archive buildings, the church and monastery could not be handed back. On June 7, authorities prevented the community from gathering to pray, stating that they needed permission to assemble, but did not detain any worshippers. On June 16, approximately 90 persons gathered outside the church and lit candles while police watched.

According to United States Department of State, Belarusian International Society for Krishna Consciousness (ISKCON) activists fear to register their communities because of possible fraud and revenge from authorities.

In 2016, ISKCON activist in Homiel was fined for outdoor religious activity. According to Human Rights Watch, arrests of ISKCON activists and other Hinduists are regular.

In July 2021, Belarusian authorities launched an attack on non-governmental organizations, and among NGOs forcibly closed by Ministry of justice was "Vedanta vada" (Russian: Веданта вада) Hinduist cultural and educational organization. "Vedanta vada" was based in Mahilioŭ and was active in promoting Indian culture and religion.

=== Abuses of religious freedom ===
The Government continued to abuse the religious freedom of several religious groups. As in the past, the most common charge against religious leaders was organizing or hosting an unauthorized meeting, a charge that arises from a law circumscribing freedom of assembly.

The law allows persons to gather to pray in private homes; however, it imposes restrictions on holding rituals, rites, or ceremonies in such locations and requires prior permission from local authorities. During the reporting period, Protestant and non-BOC Orthodox communities were fined or warned for illegally conducting religious services, carrying out unsanctioned religious activities, or illegally gathering without prior government permission.

On June 26, 2007, the Minsk Central District Court rejected a complaint by Antony Bokun, pastor of the registered John the Baptist Church, that police mistreated him following his arrest earlier in the month. On June 4, 2007, a Minsk District Court Judge sentenced Bokun to three days in prison for organizing an unauthorized religious service in his home on June 3. On that day, 10 officials raided Bokun's home during church services and took him and Polish Protestant pastor Yaroslav Lukasik to a police station. The police released Lukasik after a few hours but held Bokun overnight despite his cardiovascular condition. He became ill and needed medical attention. On June 27 and June 20, 2007, respectively, the Minsk City Court dismissed Bokun's appeals of a jail sentence and fine stemming from a separate incident. On May 28, the court had found Bokun guilty of conducting an illegal religious service and fined him $290 (620,000 rubles). Police officers had arrested Bokun on May 27 after entering his house and videotaping the service.

On May 8, 2007, police detained and warned youth activist Ivan Shutko that his participation in the campaign to prevent the Roman Catholic monastery in Minsk from being transformed into a hotel and casino might result in "great problems."

On April 11, 2007, authorities issued an official warning to Sergey Nesterovich of the unregistered God's Transfiguration Brotherhood for regularly conducting illegal religious meetings in his apartment and collecting funds. In March 2007 KGB secret police had conducted a 3-hour raid of Nesterovich's apartment during a prayer meeting. The police searched the apartment, confiscated written materials, and questioned and photographed the attendees. Nesterovich appealed the warning, but authorities denied the appeal.

In December 2006 authorities issued Pastor Nikolay Borichevskiy of the Grace of Jesus Church in Krupki village a written warning for violating residence permit regulations; he ignored the warning and remained in Krupki. When Borichevskiy asked what had brought on the charge, the officials responded that his repeated criticism of the regime drew their attention.

On August 30, 2006, Union of Evangelical Christians Salvation Church (UECSC) pastor Sergey Poznyakovich was fined $2,170 (4.65 million rubles) for performing a baptism ceremony in a nearby lake. In July 2006 UECSC Bishop Nikolay Kurkayev was fined $75 (160,000 rubles) for holding an unauthorized religious service. On July 28, 2006, authorities fined New Life Church Pastor Vyacheslav Goncharenko $470 (1 million rubles) for having conducted an unsanctioned religious service earlier that month. During the previous reporting period, there were at least 13 reported instances of the Government imposing fines ranging from $13 to $2,600 (26,000 to 5.3 million rubles) for illegal religious activity.

There were no reports of forced religious conversion.

=== Anti-Semitism ===
The number of individual anti-Semitic incidents increased during the reporting period. Anti-Semitism is tolerated by the state. Anti-Semitic acts were only sporadically investigated, and the Government allowed state enterprises to freely print and distribute anti-Semitic material.

Unlike in previous reporting periods, state-owned periodicals did not attack Jewish religious groups; however, the sale and distribution of anti-Semitic literature through state press distributors, government agencies, and stores affiliated with the BOC continued. During the reporting period, anti-Semitic and Russian ultranationalist newspapers and literature, DVDs, and videocassettes continued to be sold at Pravoslavnaya Kniga (Orthodox Bookstore), which sells Orthodox literature and religious paraphernalia. The store was part of the Khristianskaya Initsiativa company, whose general director often wrote xenophobic articles. The store continued to distribute the anti-Semitic and xenophobic newspaper Russkiy Vestnik despite a 2003 order by the Prosecutor General and the Ministry of Information to remove copies from the store. The official BOC website honors Gavril Belostokskiy, a young child allegedly murdered by Jews near Grodno in 1690, as one of its saints and martyrs. A memorial prayer to be said on the anniversary of his death alleges the "martyred and courageous" Gavril "exposed Jewish dishonesty." The book Demons on the Russian Land: Globalism as a Product of Evil, by Belarusian National Academy of Sciences (BNAS) researcher Valeriy Zelenevskiy, was also available at Pravoslavnaya Kniga. Published in Minsk at the end of 2006, the book contains numerous anti-Semitic statements, such as "the Jews still adhere to pro-slavery views." Since the state-run BNAS approved publishing of the book, Jewish leaders and human rights activists considered the book to be a reflection of certain segments of the regime's ideology.

Several Jewish religious sites were vandalized during the reporting period.

On June 28, 2007, local Jewish leaders reported that four gravestones in a Jewish cemetery were knocked down by vandals in Mogilyov earlier in the week. Relatives of those buried in the graves appealed to the police, one of whom theorized that the heavy tombstones may have been knocked down by a wind storm, despite the fact that there were no strong storms around the time of the incident.

On May 9, 2007, vandals set fire to flowers laid at the monument to the victims of the Brest Jewish ghetto. Police opened a criminal case but did not identify any suspects. This was the eighth act of vandalism at the monument since it was erected in 1992 and the third during this reporting period. In February 2007 vandals desecrated the monument, but no suspects were identified. On November 29, 2006, an explosion occurred at the same monument. The blast caused minor damage to the memorial. The Jewish community protested the local authorities' refusal to open a criminal investigation into the November incident, which police described as petty hooliganism. According to a local Jewish community leader, police were still investigating the February incident at the end of the reporting period.

On May 4, 2007, vandals drew a picture of a Star of David hanging from a gallows on the foundation of a bridge in Brest. The graffiti was removed not long after it appeared and the local Jewish community did not file a report with the police.

On March 1, 2007, independent media reported that vandals removed part of a metal plaque attached to a monument built on the site of an old Jewish cemetery in remembrance of the killing of the Minsk ghetto Bremen Jews. Also in early March 2007, a bronze memorial plaque on a residential building in central Minsk placed in remembrance of the killing of the Bremen Jews disappeared. An unidentified man claimed to have found the plaque and returned it to the Jewish community following announcements that the German ambassador would pay a $1,350 (2.9 million rubles) reward for the plaque's return. At the end of February 2007, vandals damaged the Star of David on a memorial plaque in Kurapaty honoring Jewish victims of Stalinism.

On May 3, 2007, police in Borisov opened a criminal case in connection with vandalism at the Jewish cemetery. Vandals had removed and damaged 16 tombstones at the end of April. The case remained open at the end of the reporting period; no suspects were identified.

In late February 2007, neo-Nazi activists attacked Larissa Shukailo, the head of the Mogilyov branch of the Belarusian Association for Victims of Political Repression. Two young persons threw a bottle at Shukailo, shouting "Get away to your Israel!" Shukailo filed a complaint with the authorities, but no suspects were identified by the end of the reporting period.

On November 12, 2006, vandals desecrated the Yama Holocaust memorial in central Minsk with white paint and swastikas. Despite a number of neo-Nazi anti-Semitic leaflets signed by the "Belaya Rus Aryan Resistance Front" found at the site, authorities dismissed the incident as a case of teenage hooliganism. The same day swastikas and "Beat the Jews!" graffiti were painted on the Israeli Information and Cultural Center. State-controlled STV's coverage of the vandal attacks referred to Jewish culture as "alien to Belarus." Despite government officials' promises to prosecute offenders, on March 16, 2007, police closed the criminal cases, citing lack of suspects.

In early October 2006, unidentified vandals damaged a concrete fence surrounding a Jewish cemetery and destroyed 10 tombstones in the northern city of Orsha; 17 gravestones were vandalized at a Christian cemetery. Police refused to open criminal cases, calling the acts minor civil offences.

In September 2006 vandals damaged five graves in an old Jewish cemetery in the eastern village of Sverzhan. Police opened an investigation, but no suspects were identified by the end of the reporting period.

The Jewish community continued to express concern over the concept of a "greater Slavic union" popular among nationalist organizations active in the country, including the Russian National Union (RNU), which still existed despite being officially dissolved in 2000. Throughout the reporting period, Jewish leaders petitioned the authorities to investigate neo-Nazi activities, citing continued vandalism, anti-Semitic graffiti, and threats to civil society and religious congregations. Authorities responded with empathetic letters but did not open any criminal cases in connection with these complaints.

On August 10, 2006, independent newspaper Vitebskiy Kuryer received a letter from the neo-Nazi group RNU threatening to close the newspaper if it continued publishing articles discrediting the Belarusian president and his policies aimed at making "Slavonic nations superior in comparison with Jews." The letterhead contained the slogan "To clean Russia!" and a picture of a soldier holding a strangled man with the Star of David painted on his breast and U.S. dollars in his pocket. Law enforcement agencies did not investigate the threat, maintaining that since the RNU was not registered in the region, it was impossible to track down the letter's authors.

=== Improvements and Positive Developments in Respect for Religious Freedom ===
There have been some positive developments in respect for religious freedom.

Authorities granted the St. John the Baptist Catholic Community permission to build a church in Minsk and gave the community a plot of land for the building. Construction began on June 15, 2007. This was the first Catholic church to be built in Minsk since the 1917 Revolution.

In 2007 authorities returned a building in Grodno to the St. Pokrovskiy Orthodox Cathedral.

In August 2006 civil society activists in Orsha managed to save the remains of an 18th-century church. The activists sent letters and petitions to local government officials protesting the construction of a detention center on the site. In early August construction was suspended, and on August 31 officials agreed to alter the project in an effort to prevent the construction from damaging the church's foundation.

On July 20, 2006, the Prosecutor's Office repealed a warning to preschool teacher Lyudmila Izakson-Bolotovskaya for the "illegal and deliberate dissemination of religious dogma to young children" following her appeal. In April 2006 authorities had issued an official warning to Izakson-Bolotovskaya after she and her children's Jewish musical group were shown on local television celebrating a Jewish holiday at a state-run kindergarten. Authorities had claimed that she violated the law by holding a religious celebration in a government building and illegally propagated Judaism. Izakson-Bolotovskaya maintained that this was a cultural event for nonreligious educational purposes. The authorities forced Izakson-Bolotovskaya to remove "Jewish symbols" from the classroom and threatened her with future prosecution if she continued such activities. The group reconvened in September 2006 to continue studying Jewish history and traditions.

On July 5, 2006, President Lukashenko issued a directive to return the Holy Trinity Church (St. Roch Church) in Minsk and property inside to the Roman Catholic Church. For the previous 15 years, the church was used as the music hall for the Belarusian State Philharmonic Society.

Several religious memorials were unveiled during the reporting period. Although most were privately funded, local government officials participated in most dedication ceremonies.

== Societal abuses and discrimination ==
While some members of society tried to promote religious freedom, societal abuses and discrimination based on religious beliefs occurred, and anti-Semitism and negative attitudes toward minority religious groups persisted.

As in previous years, unknown vandals destroyed crosses, both Orthodox and non-Orthodox, erected at Kurapaty, an area used by the People's Commissariat for Internal Affairs to murder more than 300,000 people in the 1930s. In April 2007 vandals attacked the Stalin-era massacre memorial site at Kurapaty, knocking over and breaking six crosses. No criminal investigation took place by the end of the reporting period.

On May 30, 2007, unidentified burglars broke into the St. George Church in Vardomichy, stealing five icons. This was the latest in a string of unsolved church burglaries that resulted in the theft of 16 icons from 3 different churches in 2007. Police did not report any breakthroughs in their investigations of these crimes, which they attributed to a ring of experienced criminals.

There were several incidents of arson during the reporting period. On March 27, 2007, vandals set fire to the Roman Catholic St. Michael Church in Mozyr and drew satanic graffiti on the exterior walls. Ten days earlier, vandals broke a sculpture, crosses, and a window at the church. On March 28, police arrested four members of the satanic group Bloody Moon; the suspects remained in jail, and the investigation was ongoing at the end of the reporting period.

On December 25, 2006, vandals set fire to the Orthodox St. George Church in Mozyr, completely destroying its roof and interior walls. The remaining external walls were covered with graffiti. This was the second time the church had been set on fire in 6 weeks; on November 13, vandals drew satanic symbols on the outside of the church and set it on fire. The four members of the Bloody Moon satanic group who were detained for vandalizing the St. Michael Church in Mozyr pleaded guilty to setting fire to the St. George Church. They remained in police custody and the investigation was ongoing at the end of the reporting period.

On July 13, 2006, there was a suspicious fire at the Roman Catholic St. Francis Xavier (Farny) Church in Grodno. The fire destroyed part of the main altar and four 18th-century sculptures. Police opened a criminal case, but no further information was available at the end of the reporting period.

Several cemeteries and burial grounds were attacked or damaged during the reporting period. On April 27, 2007, police charged a man with damaging historical property after five 10th- and 11th-century burial mounds were vandalized in Zaslavl on March 10 and 16, 2007. No further information was available by the end of the reporting period.

On February 13, 2007, police suspended a criminal investigation into a January 15, 2007, attack on a Muslim cemetery in Slonim that contains the graves of Russian Muslim soldiers killed in World War I due to failure to find suspects. Vandals overturned six gravestones, destroying two. This was the third attack on the cemetery since 1996.

Independent media reported that on November 20, 2006, unidentified vandals painted "Don't Believe Sects!" on a billboard in Baranovichi that directed persons to the Salvation Church, an affiliate of the Union of Evangelical Faith Christians in the Republic of Belarus. Officials and media opined that drunken teenagers might have been the vandals. The church claimed that this was an organized action.

On November 17, 2006, the New Life Church reported that police refused to institute criminal proceedings in connection with the defacing of their church on the night of October 31, 2006. Alleged members of the National Bolshevik Party, a Russian extremist group, splashed black paint on the church and painted in red "No to Totalitarian Sects!" and the party's symbol.

During the reporting period, there were some positive actions undertaken by private actors to promote greater respect and tolerance among different religions and to promote religious freedom.

On June 18, 2007, the General Secretaries of Catholic Bishops' Conferences of Europe concluded a 4-day forum held in Minsk. It was the first time in the contemporary history of the country that the secretaries gathered in Minsk. They discussed migration, ecumenism, pastoral care, relations with Muslim communities, and the issues facing the Roman Catholic communities in the country, including difficulties with building new churches. On June 15, the secretaries had a successful meeting with BOC Head Metropolitan Philaret.

On May 28, 2007, BOC Head Metropolitan Philaret expressed support for the public organizing committee for the commemoration of the victims of Stalinist repressions.

In February 2007 Roma and Baptist communities worked together to provide the Roma population with gospels in Romany at no charge.

On April 19, 2007, the NGO Christian Human Rights House, in cooperation with the BCD, released "Monitoring of the Violations of Christians' Rights in Belarus," which chronicled repression against Christians during 2006. Christian Human Rights House was created in the summer of 2006 to monitor religious freedom violations and to work to alleviate the repression of freedom of conscience in the country.

On June 17, 2007, more than 500 Protestant communities across the country gathered at churches to conduct prayer services calling for changes in the religion law that they see as discriminatory against Protestant congregations. On April 22, Christian communities, including Protestants and Catholics, some individual Orthodox priests, and the BCD launched a campaign to collect 50,000 signatures on a petition calling for the revocation of the 2002 law on religions and religious organizations. On May 8, the Belarusian Exarchate of the ROC urged believers not to sign the petition, claiming that the law helps maintain peace among religious communities and stability in the country. By the end of the reporting period, the campaign reported collecting thousands of signatures.

On June 4, 2007, independent news services reported that approximately 5,000 Protestants gathered at the Church of Grace in Minsk to pray for persecuted religious activists and for freedom of religion, including the right to pray in private homes. The crowd adopted an appeal to President Lukashenko requesting a review of the 2002 religion law and an end to the arrests of ministers.

== See also ==
- Religion in Belarus
- Human rights in Belarus
