= Religion in Germany =

Religion in Germany (2025 estimate)
1. No religion (48.1%)
2. Catholicism (23.0%)
3. Protestantism (20.8%)
4. Eastern Orthodoxy (1.5%)
5. Other Christians (1.0%)
6. Islam, excluding Alevism (4.0%)
7. Alevism (0.8%)
8. Buddhism (0.2%)
9. Judaism (0.1%)
10. Hinduism (0.1%)
11. Yazidism (0.1%)
12. Other religions (0.3%)

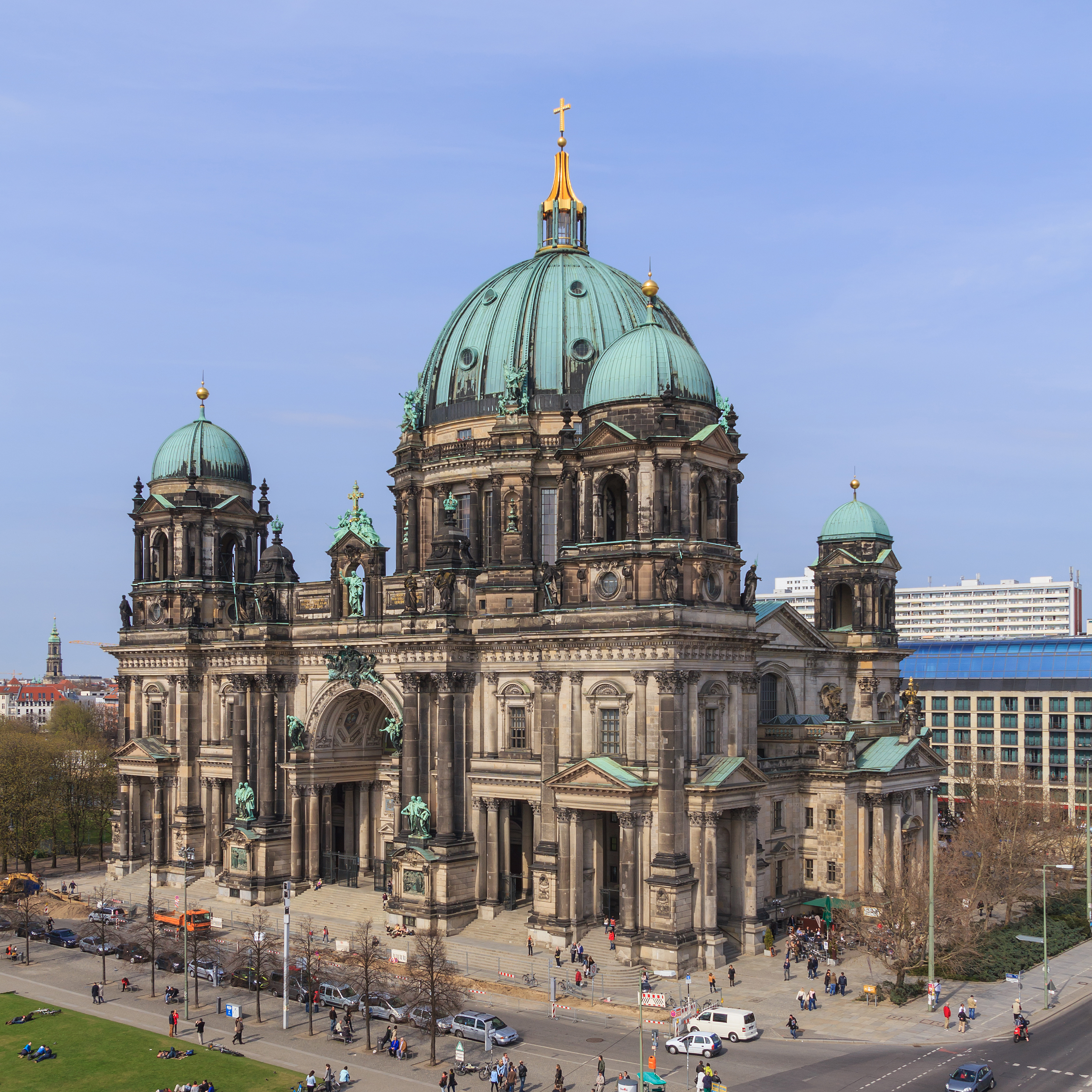
Berlin Cathedral (Protestant).

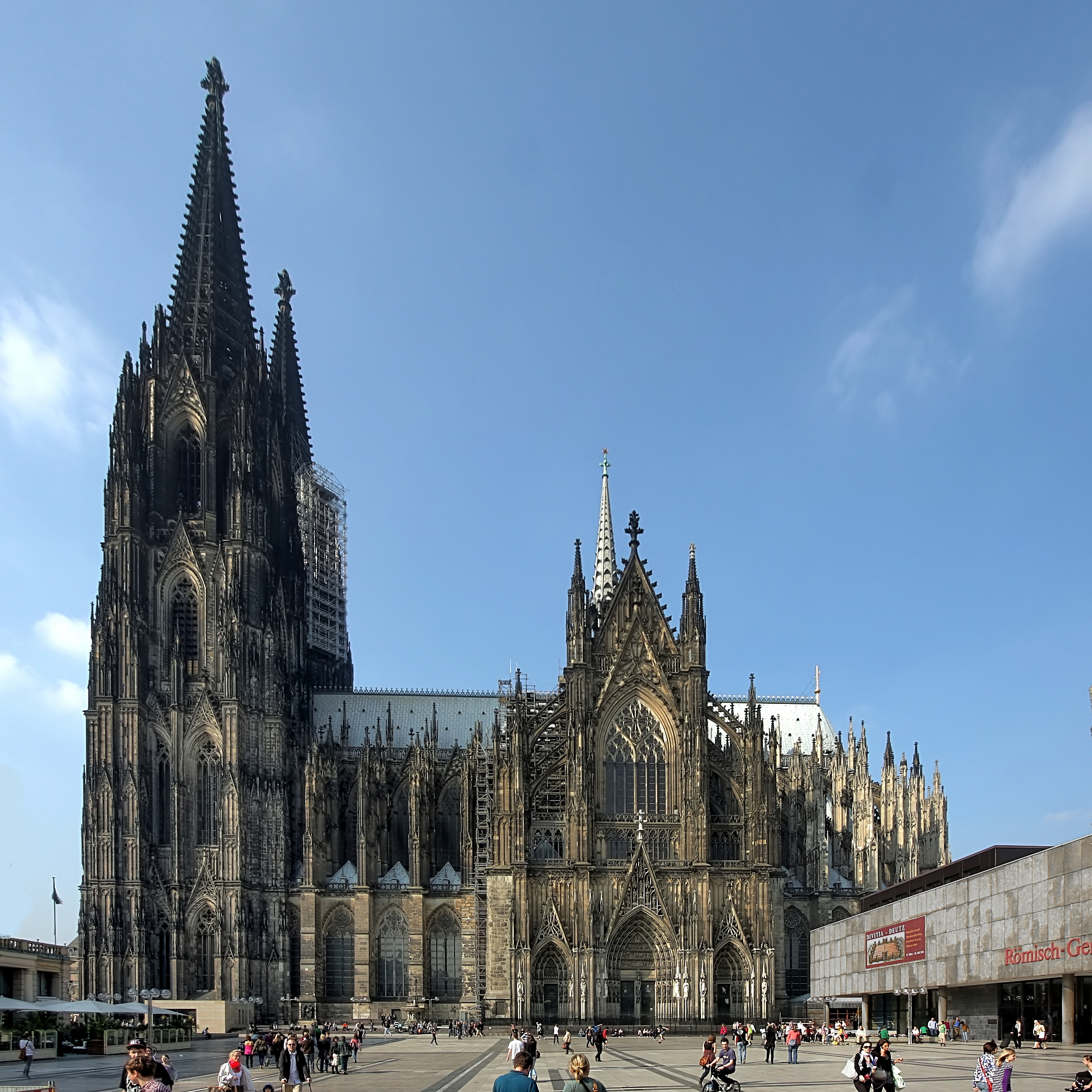
Cologne Cathedral (Catholic).

Christianity is the largest religion in Germany. It was introduced to the area of modern Germany by 300 AD, while parts of that area belonged to the Roman Empire, and later, when Franks and other Germanic tribes converted to Christianity from the fifth century onwards. The area became fully Christianized by the time of Charlemagne in the eighth and ninth century. After the Reformation started by Martin Luther in the early 16th century, many people left the Catholic Church and became Protestant, mainly Lutheran and Reformed. In the 17th and 18th centuries, German cities also became hubs of heretical and sometimes anti-religious freethinking, challenging the influence of religion and contributing to the spread of secular thinking about morality across Germany and Europe.

In 2025, 46.3% of the population were Christians, among them 43.8% members of the two large Christian churches. Around half of Christians in Germany are Catholics, mostly from the Latin Church; Catholicism is stronger in the southern and the western part of the country. Nearly half belongs to the Protestant Church in Germany (EKD) that is stronger in the northern regions, and the rest to several small Christian denominations such as the Union of Evangelical Free Churches in Germany, the Eastern Orthodox Church or the Jehovah's Witnesses. Estimations for the percentage of Muslims vary between 4.8% and 6.7%, while much smaller religions include Buddhism, Judaism, Hinduism and Yazidism. The rest of the population is not affiliated with any church, and many are atheist, agnostic, or otherwise irreligious. 60% of German residents say that they believe there is a God, 9% say that they believe there is a higher power or spiritual force and 27% say that they do not believe there is a God, higher power or spiritual force. In a Eurobarometer survey from 2021 35% of residents identify with their religion or belief.

Nearly half of Germans have no religion. Demographics of religion in Germany vary greatly by region and age, with sharp divides that reflect both the country's history as an Enlightenment hub and its later experiences with post-war communism. Non-religious people typically represent the majority in Germany's city-states, meaning Berlin, Hamburg and Bremen, as well as in the eastern states which used to be East Germany between 1945 and 1990. By contrast, the western states of what in the same period used to be West Germany are more religious.

== History ==
=== Paganism and Roman settlement (1000 BC–300 AD) ===
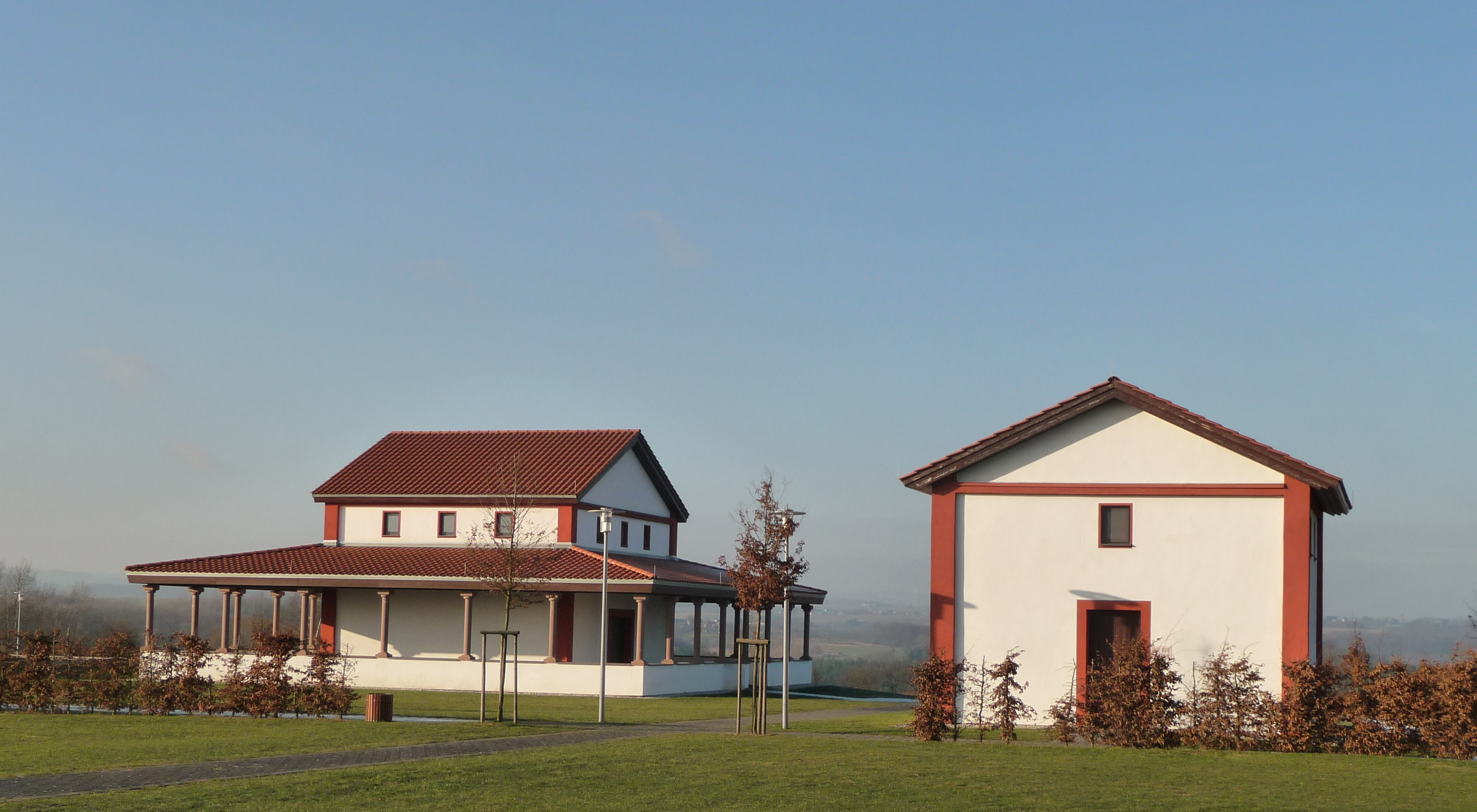
Martberg Gallo-Roman temple dedicated to Lenus, rebuilt in Pommern, Rhineland-Palatinate

Ancient Germanic paganism was a polytheistic religion practised in prehistoric Germany and Scandinavia, as well as Roman territories of Germania by the first century AD. It had a pantheon of deities that included Donar/Thunar, Wuotan/Wodan, Frouwa/Frua, Balder/Phol/Baldag, and others shared with northern Germanic paganism. Celtic paganism and later Gallo-Roman syntheses were instead practised in western and southern parts of modern Germany, while Slavic paganism was practised in the east.

Discovered in 2018 in Praunheim and deciphered in 2024 using computed tomography, the 3rd-century Frankfurt silver inscription is a Christian amulet from Nida. As one of the earliest material testimonies of Christianity north of the Alps, this amulet proves Christianity reached Roman Germany 50 to 100 years earlier than the previously known 4th-century evidence.

=== Late Roman and Carolingian eras (300–1000) ===
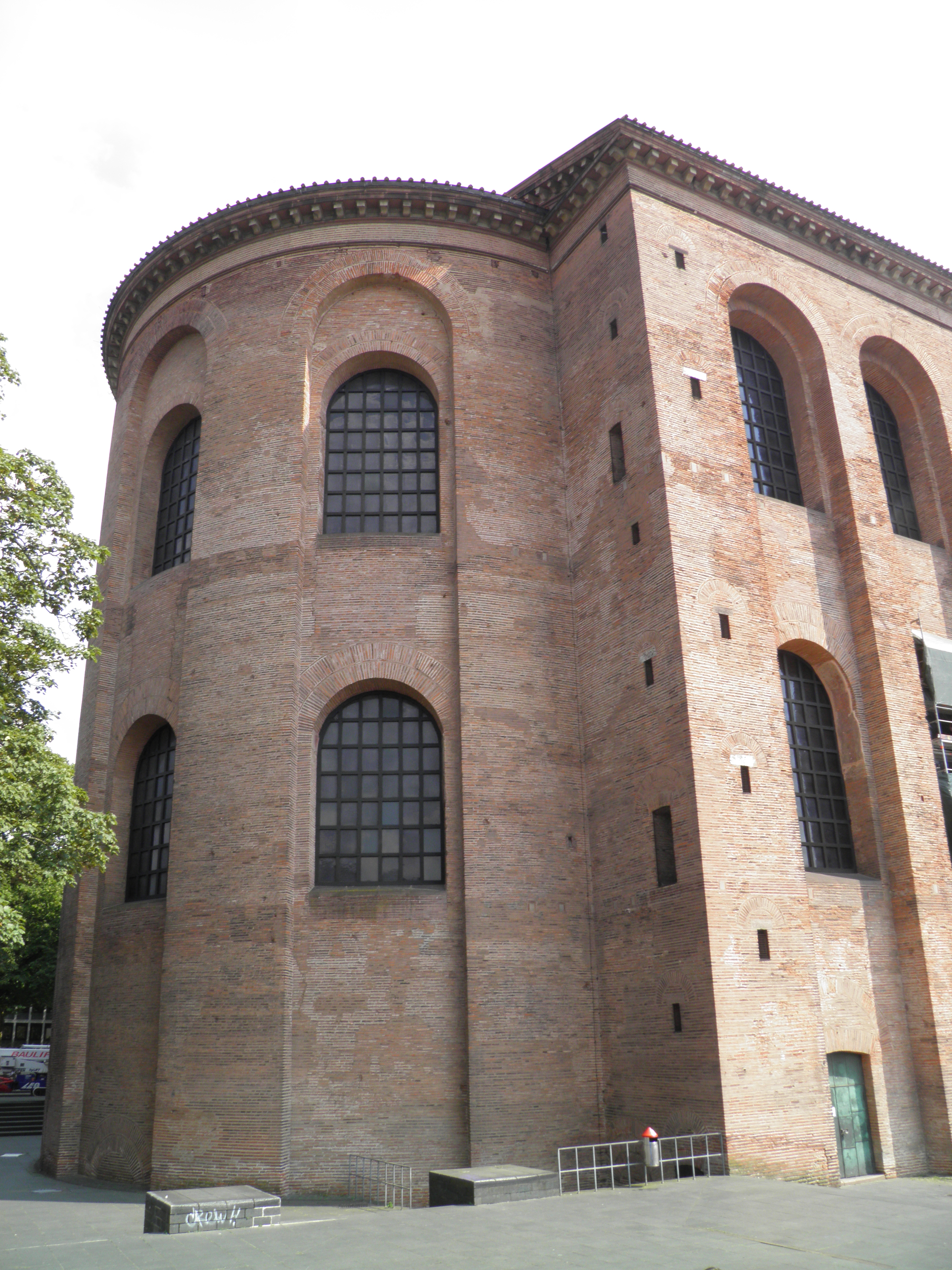
The Aula Palatina of Trier, a basilica constructed during 306–337 AD

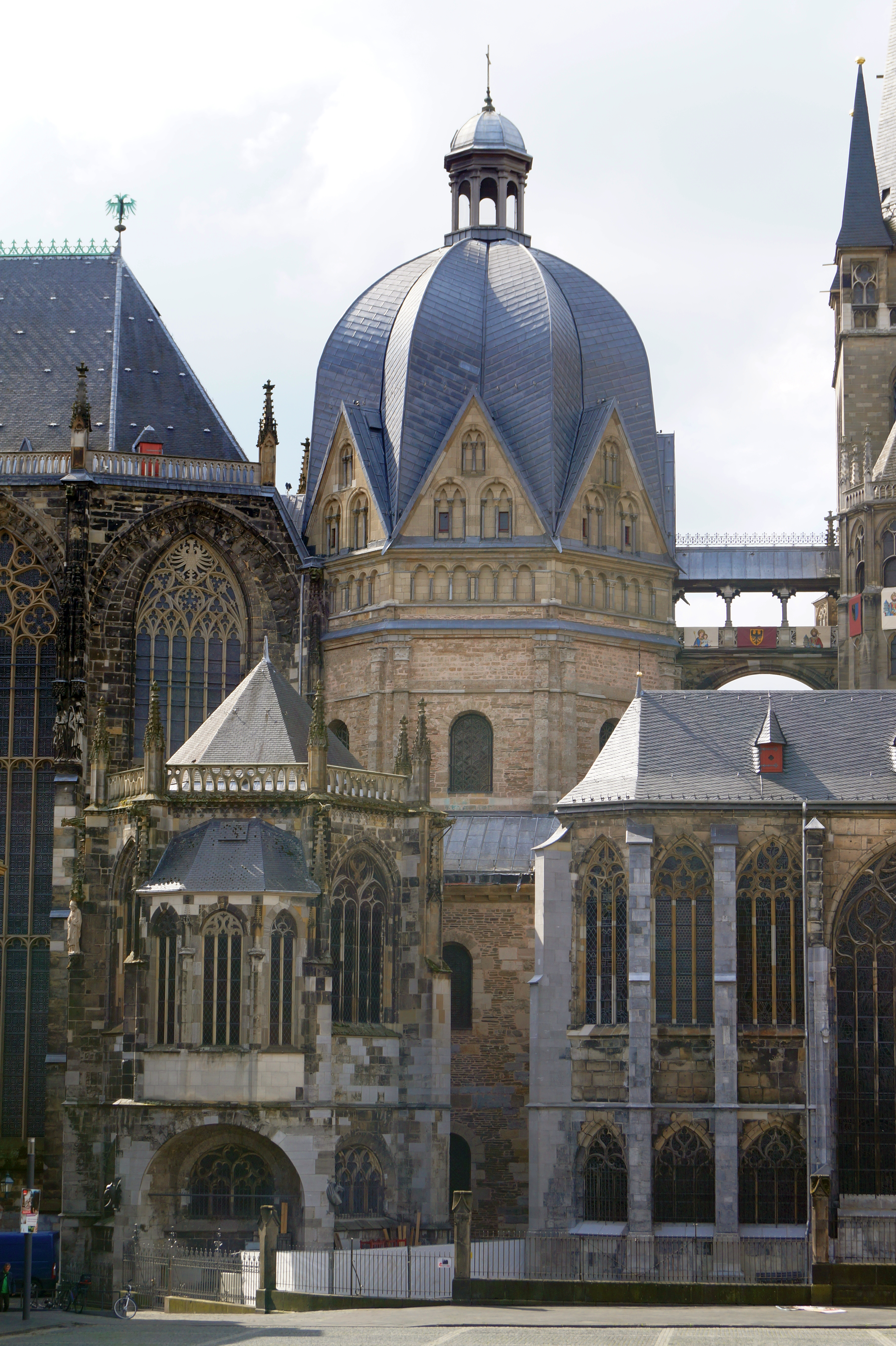
The Palatine Chapel, Aachen, built c. 800

In the territories of Germany under the control of the Roman Empire (the provinces Raetia, Germania Superior and Germania Inferior), early Christianity was introduced and began to flourish after the fourth century. Although pagan Roman temples existed beforehand, Christian religious structures were soon built, such as the Aula Palatina in Trier (then the capital of the Roman province Gallia Belgica), completed during the reign of Roman emperor Constantine I (306–337).

During the Carolingian period, Christianity spread throughout Germany, particularly during the reign of Charlemagne (r. 768–814). Religious structures built during the Carolingian period include the Palatine Chapel, Aachen, a surviving component of the Palace of Aachen built by architect Odo of Metz during the reign of Charlemagne.

=== Pre-Reformation period (1000–1517) ===
Territories of the present-day Germany, like much of Europe, were entirely Roman Catholic with religious break-offs being suppressed by both the Papacy and the Holy Roman Emperor.

=== Reformation, Counter-Reformation and the Thirty Years' War (1517–1648) ===
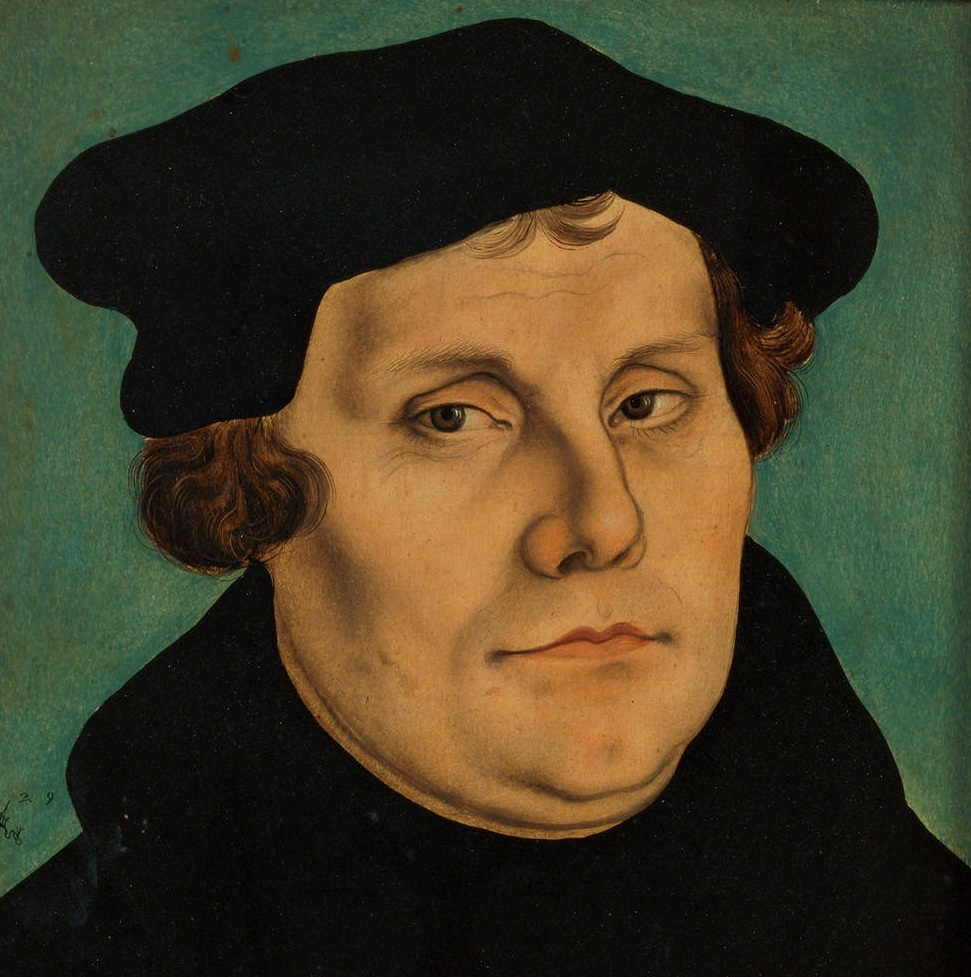
Martin Luther (1483–1546) was responsible for the Protestant Reformation.

Roman Catholicism was the sole established religion in the Holy Roman Empire until the advent of the Protestant Reformation changed this drastically. In the early 16th century abuses (such as selling indulgences in the Catholic Church) occasioned much discontent, and a general desire for reform emerged. In 1517 the Reformation began with the publication of Martin Luther's 95 Theses detailing 95 assertions which Luther believed showed corruption and misguidance within the Catholic Church. The Reformation demonstrated Luther's disagreement both with the way in which the higher clergy used and abused power, and with the very idea of a papacy. In 1521 the Diet of Worms outlawed Luther, but the Reformation spread rapidly. Luther translated the Bible into German by using the Latin Vulgate, Hebrew, and Greek versions, establishing the basis of the modern German language. A curious fact is that Luther spoke a dialect which had minor importance in the German language of that time. After the publication of his Bible translation, his dialect evolved into what is now standard modern German.

With the protestation of the Lutheran princes at the Imperial Diet of Speyer (1529) and rejection of the Lutheran "Augsburg Confession" at the Diet of Augsburg (1530), a separate Lutheran church emerged.

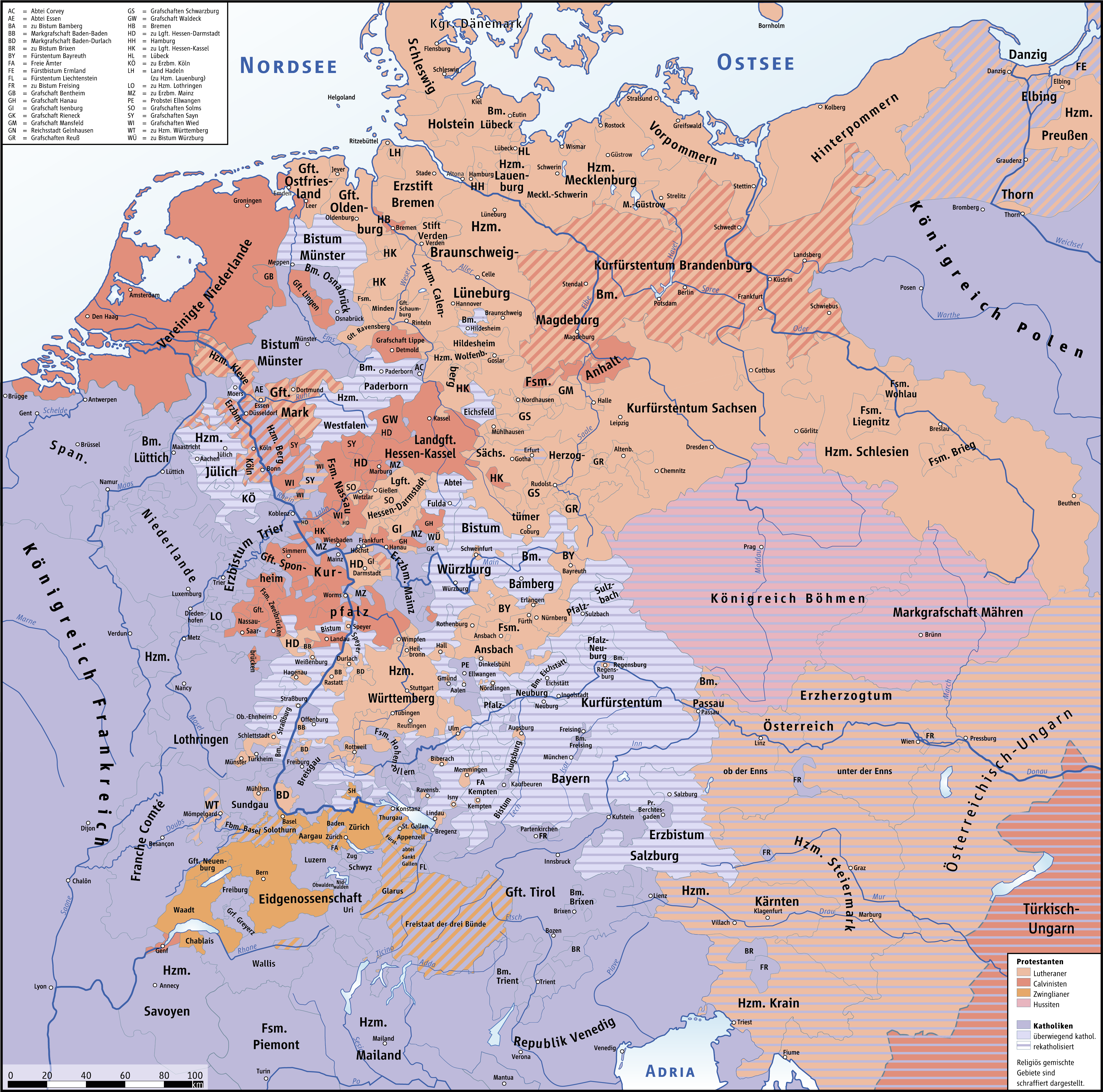
Religious fragmentation at the outbreak of the Thirty Years' War in 1618

From 1545 the Counter-Reformation began in Germany. Much of its impetus came from the newly founded (in 1540) Jesuit order. It restored Catholicism to many areas, including Bavaria. The Holy Roman Empire became religiously diverse; for the most part, the states of northern and central Germany became Protestant (chiefly Lutheran, but also Calvinist/Reformed) while the states of southern Germany and the Rhineland largely remained Catholic. In 1547 the Holy Roman Emperor Charles V defeated the Schmalkaldic League, an alliance of Protestant rulers. The Peace of Augsburg in 1555 brought recognition of the Lutheran faith. But the treaty also stipulated that the religion of a state was to be that of its ruler (cuius regio, eius religio).

In 1608/1609 the Protestant Union and the Catholic League formed. The Thirty Years' War (1618–1648), one of the most destructive conflicts in European history, played out primarily in German lands, but involved most of the countries of Europe. It was to some extent a religious conflict, involving both Protestants and Catholics.

=== Post-Thirty Years' War period and Protestant church unions (1648–1871) ===
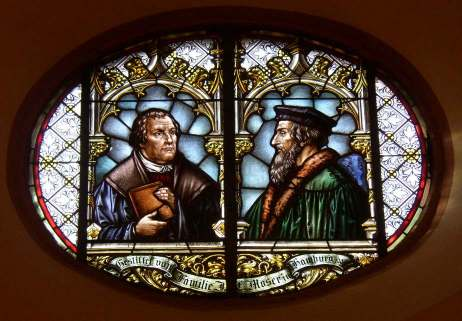
Glass window in the town church of Wiesloch with Martin Luther and John Calvin commemorating the 1821 union of Lutheran and Reformed churches in the Grand Duchy of Baden

Two main developments reshaped religion in Germany after 1814. There was a movement to unite the larger Lutheran and the smaller Reformed Protestant churches. The churches themselves brought this about in Baden, Nassau, and Bavaria. However, in Prussia King Frederick William III was determined to handle unification entirely on his own terms, without consultation. His goal was to unify the Protestant churches, and to impose a single standardised liturgy, organisation, and even architecture. The long-term goal was to have fully centralised royal control of all the Protestant churches. In a series of proclamations over several decades the Evangelical Church of the Prussian Union was formed, bringing together the more numerous Lutherans and the less numerous Reformed Protestants. The government of Prussia now had full control over church affairs, with the king himself recognised as the leading bishop. Opposition to unification came from the "Old Lutherans" in Prussia and Silesia who followed the theological and liturgical forms they had followed since the days of Luther. The government attempted to crack down on them, so they went underground. Tens of thousands migrated to South Australia and the United States, where they formed the Missouri Synod. Finally, in 1845 the new king, Frederick William IV, offered a general amnesty and allowed the Old Lutherans to form separate free church associations with only nominal government control.

From the religious point of view of the typical Catholic or Protestant, major changes were underway in terms of a much more personalised religiosity that focused on the individual more than the church or the ceremony. Opposing the rationalism of the late 18th century, there was a new emphasis on the psychology and feeling of the individual, especially in terms of contemplating sinfulness, redemption, and the mysteries and the revelations of Christianity. Pietistic revivals were common among Protestants. Among Catholics there was a sharp increase in popular pilgrimages. In 1844 alone, half a million pilgrims made a pilgrimage to the city of Trier in the Rhineland to view the Seamless robe of Jesus, said to be the robe that Jesus wore on the way to his crucifixion. Catholic bishops in Germany had historically been largely independent of Rome, but now the Vatican exerted increasing control, a new "ultramontanism" of Catholics highly loyal to Rome. A sharp controversy broke out in 1837–38 in the largely Catholic Rhineland over the religious education of children of mixed marriages, where the mother was Catholic and the father Protestant. The government passed laws to require that these children always be raised as Protestants, contrary to Napoleonic law that had previously prevailed and allowed the parents to make the decision. It put the Catholic Archbishop under house arrest. In 1840, the new King Frederick William IV sought reconciliation and ended the controversy by agreeing to most of the Catholic demands.

=== Kulturkampf and the German Empire (1871–1918) ===
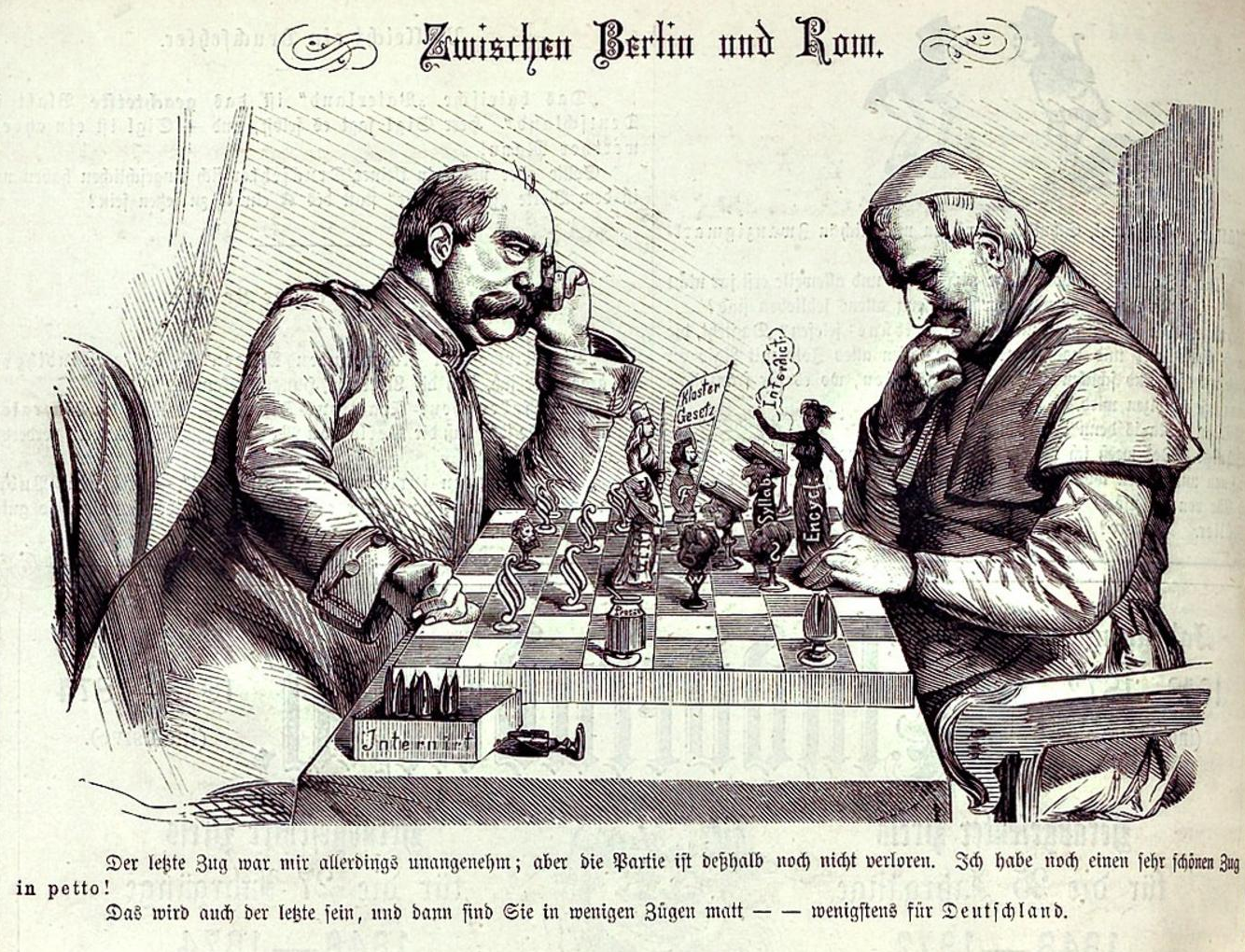
Between Berlin and Rome, Bismarck (left) confronts Pope Pius IX, 1875.

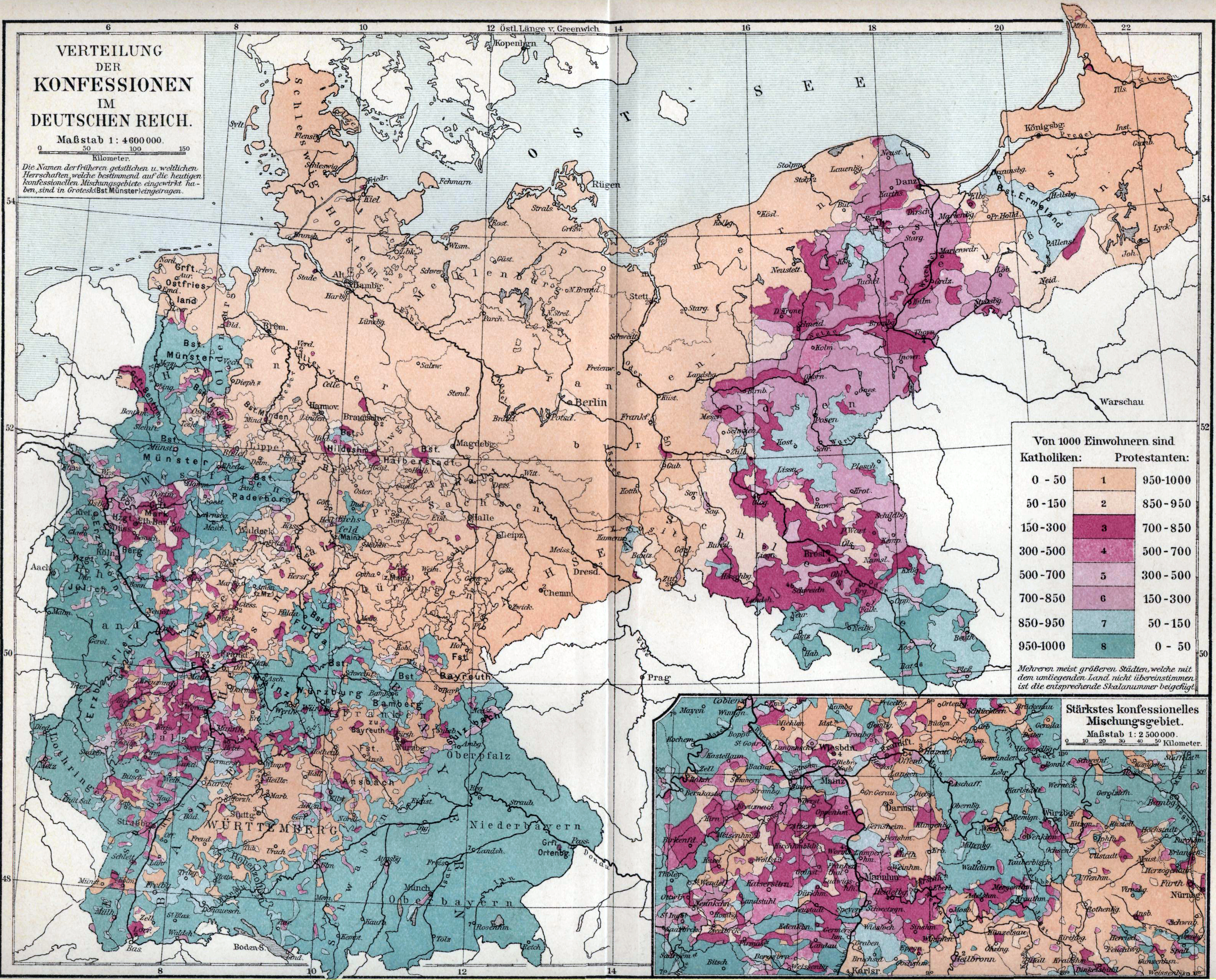
The religious situation in the German Empire about 1895. Tan, purple, and pink areas are predominantly Protestant, lilac and blue areas predominantly Catholic.

Chancellor Otto von Bismarck would not tolerate any base of power outside Germany and launched the Kulturkampf ("culture war") against the power of the pope and the Catholic Church. This gained strong support from German liberals, who saw the Catholic Church as the bastion of reaction and their greatest enemy. The Catholic element, in turn, saw the National Liberals as its worst enemy and formed the Center Party.

Catholics, although about a third of the national population, were seldom allowed to hold major positions in the Imperial government or the Prussian government. After 1871, there was a systematic purge of Catholics; in the powerful interior ministry, which handled all police affairs, the only Catholic was a messenger boy.

The German Empire passed the Pulpit Law (1871), which made it a crime for any cleric to discuss political issues, and the Jesuits Law (1872) drove this order out of German territory. In 1873, Bismarck, as prime minister of Prussia, launched further anti-church measures: Public schools and the registration of births, marriages and deaths were transferred from religious authorities (including the Protestant state church) to the state. Germans could now change their religious affiliation through the civil registry. Other German states followed through with similar measures. Nearly all Catholic bishops, clergy, and laymen rejected the legality of the new laws, and were defiant facing the increasingly heavy penalties and imprisonments imposed by Bismarck's government. Historian Anthony Steinhoff reports the casualty totals:

As of 1878, only three of eight Prussian dioceses still had bishops, some 1,125 of 4,600 parishes were vacant, and nearly 1,800 priests ended up in jail or in exile. ...Finally, between 1872 and 1878, numerous Catholic newspapers were confiscated, Catholic associations and assemblies were dissolved, and Catholic civil servants were dismissed merely on the pretence of having Ultramontane sympathies.

The British ambassador Odo Russell reported to London in October 1872 how Bismarck's plans were backfiring by strengthening the ultramontane (pro-papal) position inside German Catholicism:

The German Bishops who were politically powerless in Germany and theologically in opposition to the Pope in Rome – have now become powerful political leaders in Germany and enthusiastic defenders of the now infallible Faith of Rome, united, disciplined, and thirsting for martyrdom, thanks to Bismarck's uncalled for antiliberal declaration of War on the freedom they had hitherto peacefully enjoyed.

Bismarck underestimated the resolve of the Catholic Church and did not foresee the extremes that this struggle would entail. The Catholic Church denounced the harsh new laws as anti-catholic and mustered the support of its rank and file voters across Germany. In the following elections, the Center Party won a quarter of the seats in the Imperial Diet. The conflict ended after 1879 for two reasons: Pope Pius IX died in 1878 and was succeeded by the more conciliatory Pope Leo XIII. Bismarck was also looking for greater parliamentary support after his alliance with the National Liberals ended over Bismarck's tariff changes and Social-Democrats emerged as new threat. Following negotiations with Leo XIII, peace was restored: the bishops returned, and the jailed clerics were released. Laws were toned down or taken back (Mitigation Laws 1880–1883 and Peace Laws 1886/87), but the Jesuits Law and the Pulpit Law were not repealed until 1917 and 1953, respectively. The changes concerning schools, civil registry, marriage and religious disaffiliation remain in place today. The Center Party gained strength and became an ally of Bismarck, especially when he attacked socialism.

=== Weimar Republic and Nazi Germany (1918–1945) ===
Religion in the 1925 census

The national constitution of 1919 determined that the newly formed Weimar Republic had no state church, and guaranteed freedom of religion. Earlier, these freedoms were mentioned only in state constitutions. Protestants and Catholics were equal before the law, and freethought flourished. The German Freethinkers League attained about 500,000 members, many of whom were atheists, before the organisation was shut down by the Nazis in May 1933.

When Adolf Hitler's Nazi Party seized power in January 1933, it sought to assert state supremacy over all sectors of life. The Reichskonkordat neutralized the Catholic Church as a political force. Through the pro-Nazi Deutsche Christenbewegung ("German Christians movement") and the forced merger of the German Evangelical Church Confederation into the Protestant Reich Church, Protestantism was brought under state control. Following a "gradual worsening of relations" in late 1936, the Nazis supported Kirchenaustrittsbewegung ("movement to leave the church"). Although there was no top-down official directive to revoke church membership, some Nazi Party members started doing so voluntarily and put other members under pressure to follow their example. Those who left the churches were designated as Gottgläubig: they believed in a higher power, often a creator-God with a special interest in the German nation, but did not belong to any church, nor were they atheists. Many were Germanic neopagans. This movement, especially promoted by Reichsführer-SS Heinrich Himmler, remained relatively small and by 1939, 3.5% of Germans identified as Gottgläubig; the overwhelming majority of 94.5% remained Protestant or Catholic, and only 1.5% did not profess any faith. From 1933, Jews in Germany were increasingly marginalised, expelled and persecuted for a combination of religious, racial and economic reasons. From 1941 to the fall of Nazi Germany in 1945, they were actively massacred during the Holocaust.

=== Cold War and contemporary period (1945–present) ===
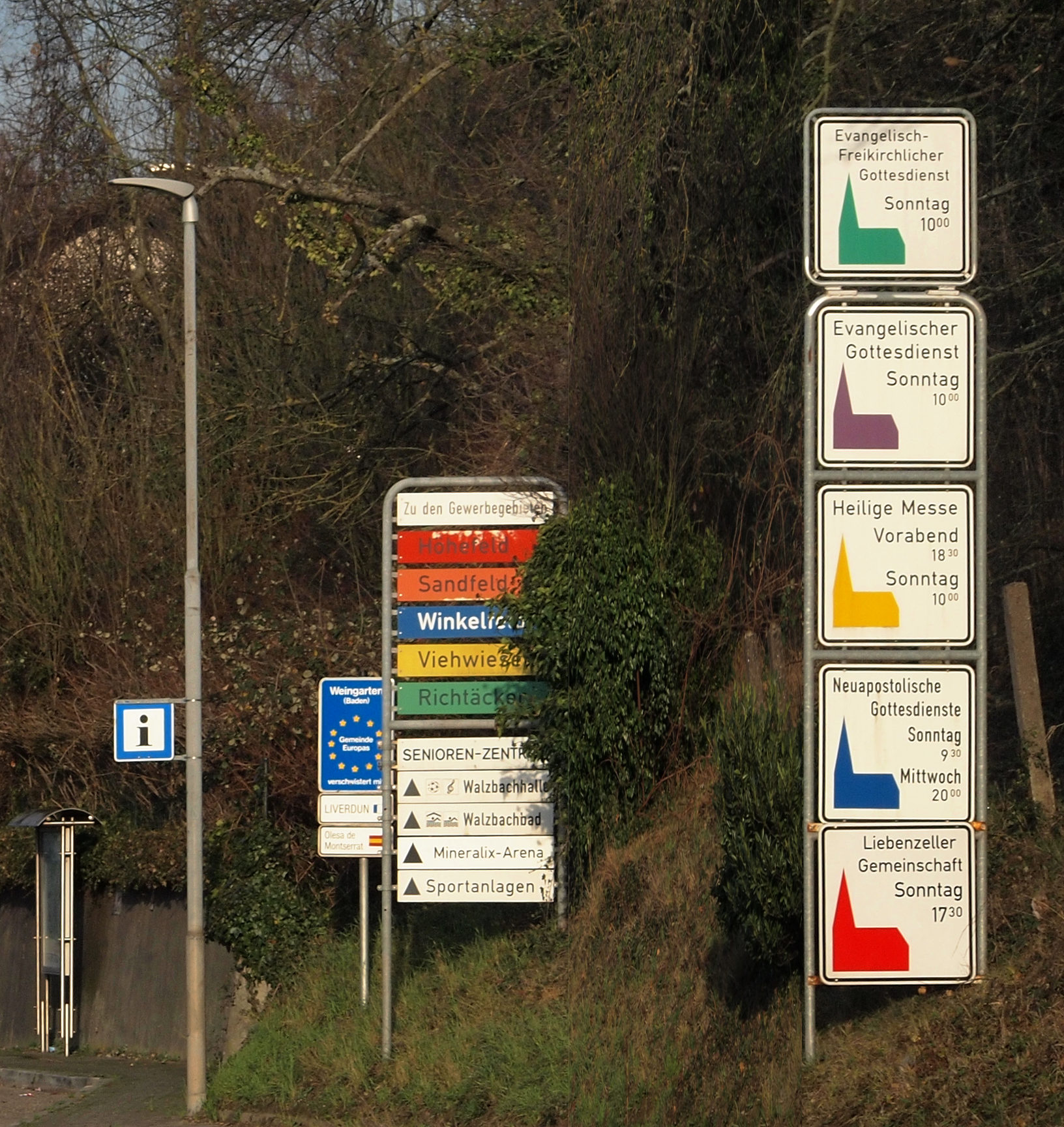
Road signs inform visitors about the usual timing of church services.

In the aftermath of World War II, two states emerged in Germany in 1949: West Germany under the aegis of the Western Allies, and East Germany as part of the Soviet bloc. West Germany, officially known as the Federal Republic of Germany, adopted a constitution in 1949 which protected freedom of religion and adopted the regulations of the Weimar Constitution; consequently, secularisation in West Germany proceeded slowly. East Germany, officially known as the German Democratic Republic, had a communist system which actively tried to reduce the influence of religion in society; the government restricted Christian churches and discriminated against Christians. In the 21st century, eastern German states, including the area of the former eastern capital, East Berlin, are less religious than western German states.

Religious communities which are of sufficient size and stability and which are loyal to the constitution can be recognised as Körperschaften öffentlichen Rechtes (statutory corporations). This gives them certain privileges – for example, being able to give religious instruction in state schools (as enshrined in the German constitution, though some states are exempt from this) and having membership fees collected (for a fee) by the German revenue department as "church tax" (Kirchensteuer): a surcharge of between 8 and 9% of the income tax. The status mainly applies to the Catholic Church, the mainline Protestant Church in Germany, a number of free churches, and Jewish communities. There has been much discussion about allowing other religious groups (such as Muslims) into this system as well.

In 2018 the states of Lower Saxony, Schleswig-Holstein, Hamburg and Bremen made Reformation Day (31 October) a permanent official holiday. This initiative began after the day had been held as a nationwide holiday in 2017, due to the 500th Reformation anniversary of the Reformation, and also due to the fact that the northern German states have significantly fewer holidays than the southern ones.

In 2019 the Catholic News Agency reported that the Catholic church in Germany had a net loss of 216,078 members the previous year. The Protestant churches in Germany had a similar net loss of membership of about 220,000 members. While the total of Catholic and Protestant church membership as of 2019 stands at 45 million or 53%, demographers predict that based on current trends it will fall to 23 million by 2060. In 2020 it was reported that the Catholic church in Germany had a 402,000 loss in membership, the largest ever single year decrease up to that point. The Protestant churches in Germany also had a large drop in membership of about 440,000. Falling membership means empty churches. Consequently between 2000 and 2024 the Catholic church deconsecrated 611 church buildings while the Protestant church decommissioned around half that number. The buildings are used in various ways for example as housing, sporting facilities or cultural amenities. Some are demolished or in rare cases house another Christian church.

== Demographics ==
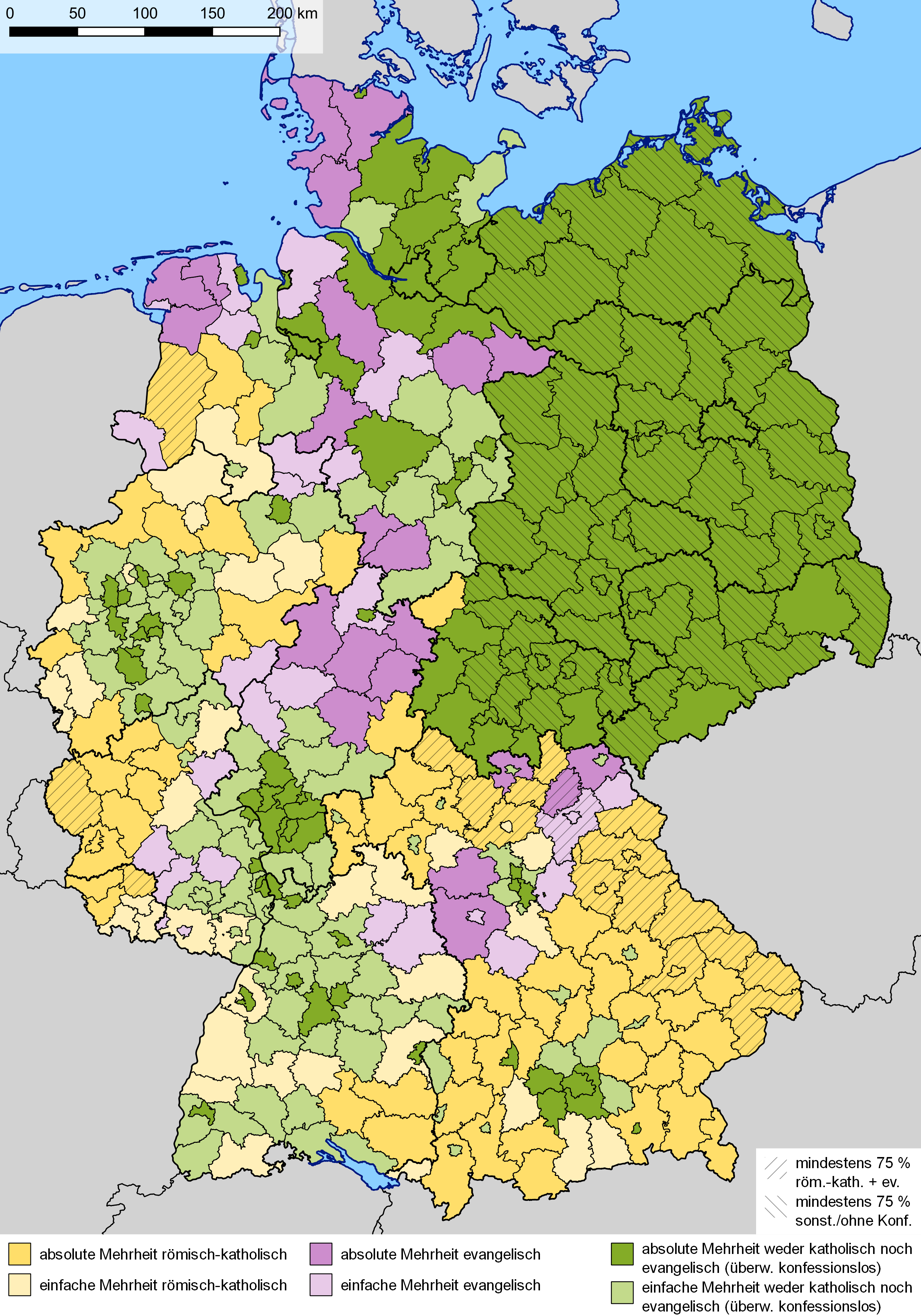
Majority religious affiliation according to the 2022 census. Light colors indicate a simple plurality instead. Slanted lines indicate a +75% supermajority. Roman Catholic Protestant neither Catholic nor Protestant (predominantly non-religious)

As per the most recent census (May 2022) Catholics are predominant in the south and west, while unaffiliated people are concentrated in the east, where they make up the majority of the population, and are also significant in the north and west of the country, were they make up the majority of the population in metropolitan areas. With the decline of Christianity in the late 20th and early 21st century, accentuated in the east by the official atheism of the former German Democratic Republic, the northeastern states of Germany are now mostly not religious (70%), with many of the people living there being agnostics and atheists.

Immigrations in the late 20th and early 21st century have brought new religions into Germany, including Eastern Orthodox Christianity and Islam. Eastern Orthodoxy is practised among immigrant Greeks, Serbs, Russians, Romanians and other communities. Most Muslims are Sunnis, but there are a small number of Alevis, Shi'a and members of other minority sects. Moreover, Germany has Europe's third-largest Jewish population (after France and the United Kingdom).

=== Censuses ===
Map of religion in Germany according to the 1925 census. Protestant Christianity (64.12%) Catholic Christianity (32.35%) Judaism and others (3.53%)

In modern Germany, several censuses have been carried out. From the reformation until the 1960s, the majority of the German population was Protestant (mainly Lutherans belonging to the Protestant Church in Germany) while approximatively one-third of the population was Catholic. After the German reunification, the religious landscape was significantly changed, as found by the 2011 Census, the first one since the 1960s.

The census in 2011 found that Christianity was the religion of 53,257,550 people or 66.8% of the total population, among whom 24,869,380 or 31.2% were Catholics, 24,552,110 or 30.8% were Protestants of the Protestant Church in Germany, 714,360 or 0.9% were members of Protestant free churches, and 1,050,740 or 1.3% were members of Eastern Orthodox and Oriental Orthodox churches. A further 2.6% was affiliated to any other Christian denomination. Jews were 83,430 people or 0.1%, and 4,137,140 or 5.2% were members of other religions. The remaining 22,223,010 people, or 27.9% of the total German population, were not believers in or not members of any religion (including atheists, agnostics and believers in unrecognised religions).

Religion in Germany according to the censuses 1910–2011 The source for the years in italics is the church membership count.
Religion	1910 (Note: German Empire borders.)		1925 (Note: Weimar Republic borders, i.e. German state borders of 31 December 1937.)		1933		1939		1946 (Note: Aggregated data from the Federal Republic of Germany and from the Democratic Republic of Germany, excluding the Saar Protectorate until 1956.)		1950		1960s (Note: The censuses were carried out in different years; that of West Germany was done on 6 June 1961 while that of East Germany was done on 31 December 1964.)		1990		2001		2011	
Religion	Number	%	Number	%	Number	%	Number	%	Number	%	Number	%	Number	%	Number	%	Number	%	Number	%
Christianity	63,812,000	98.3	60,208,000	96.5	62,037,000	95.2	65,127,000	94.0	59,973,519	94.9	65,514,677	94.7	65,455,144	89.4	57,947,000	73.2	52,742,000	64.1	53,257,550	66.8
–EKD and Free Churches	39,991,000	61.6	40,015,000	64.1	40,865,000	62.7	42,103,000	60.8	37,240,625	59.0	40,974,217	59.2	39,293,907	53.7	29,422,000	37.2	26,454,000	32.2	25,266,470	31.7
–Catholicism	23,821,000	36.7	20,193,000	32.4	21,172,000	32.5	23,024,000	33.2	22,732,894	35.9	24,540,460	35.5	26,161,237	35.7	28,525,000	36.1	26,288,000	32.0	24,869,380	31.2
–Eastern Orthodox Christianity	-	-	-	-	-	-	-	-	-	-	-	-	-	-	–	–	–	-	1,050,740	1.3
–Other Christians	–	–	–	–	–	–	–	–	–	–	–	–	–	–	–	–	–	–	2,070,960	2.6
Judaism	615,000	1.0	564,000	0.9	500,000	0.8	222,000	0.3	-	-	-	-	-	-	–	–	–	-	84,430	0.1
Other (Note: Data from 1910 to 1939 included non-religious Germans, non-religious Jews, and people of non-Christian religions, while religious Jews were counted separately. From 1939 onwards non-religious people were counted separately. Data from 1946 to the 1960s included Jews, who otherwise did not have a separate category.)	498,000	0.7	1,639,000	2.6	2,681,000	4.0	3,966,000	5.7	623,956	1.0 (Note: Excluded members of any non-Christian religion living in East Germany.)	752,575	1.1	1,089,673	1.5	–	–	–	-	4,137,140	5.2
No religion	-	-	-	-	-	-	1,190,629	1.5	2,572,369	4.1 (Note: Included members of any non-Christian religion living in East Germany.)	3,438,020	4.9	7,459,914	10.2	–	–	–	-	22,223,010	27.9
Total population	64,926,000	100	62,411,000	100	65,218,000	100	69,314,000	100	63,169,844	100	69,187,072	100	73,178,431	100	79,112,831	100	82,259,540	100	79,652,360	100

=== Church figures and other estimates ===
German major religious bodies publish yearly updated records of their membership.

Only certain religious groups publish updated figures on their official membership, and this kind of data is collected in order to levy taxes on the registered membership of those churches, which corresponds to 9% of the total income tax (8% in Baden-Württemberg). According to a study, nearly 29% of the persons who unregistered from their church in 2022 did so in order to avoid paying the church tax. According to a 2017 study by the Pew Research Center, around 20% of people who are not registered to any church nonetheless considered themselves Christians.

According to these church stats, Christianity is the largest religious group in Germany, with around 38.7 million adherents (46.3%) in 2025 of whom 19.2 million are Catholics (23%) and 17.4 million are Protestants (20.8%).

According to other estimates, Eastern Orthodox Christianity has 1.2 million members or 1.5% of the population. Other minor Christian religions counted together have approximately 0.8 million members, forming 1% of the total population.

The second largest religion in Germany is Islam, with around 3.3–4.7 million adherents (3.9–5.7% of the population), almost all of whom have full or partial foreign background. Smaller religious groups include Buddhism (0.2%), Judaism (0.1%), Hinduism (0.1%), Yazidis (0.1%) and others (0.3%). At the end of 2025, 40.1 million or 48.1% of the country's population were not affiliated with any church or religion.

Demographers estimate that in Germany there are around 100,000 religious Jews (Judaism), and a further 90,000 ethnic Jews with no religion, around 100,000 Yazidis, 130,000 Hindus, and 270,000 Buddhists.

=== Survey data ===
Percentages of the population for different religious groups
Religious group Source	Total Christianity	Christian denominations				No religion	Other religions			
Religious group Source	Total Christianity	Catholicism	Protestants	Eastern Orthodox	Others	No religion	Islam	Judaism	Buddhism	Others
Eurobarometer (September 2019)	61	30	24	2	5	30	4	0	0	4
German General Social Survey (2018)	63.2	29.1	31.9	1.5	0.7	33.3	2.9	0.1	0.1	0.3
International Social Survey Programme (2017)	63.5	30.1	31.1	1.7	0.6	33.4	2.5	0.1	0.1	0.3
Politbarometer (2017) entitled to vote only	66.1	32.4	33.7	included in "others"		29.9	2.2	0.04	1.6 (incl. other Christians)	

- The 2023-2024 European Social Survey found that 23% of Germans identified as Protestant and 22% as Catholic.
- A 2023 IPSOS religion survey found that 24% of Germans identified as Protestant/Evangelical or other christian while 20% identified as Catholic.
- In 2018, according to a study jointly conducted by London's St Mary's University's Benedict XVI Centre for Religion and Society and the Institut Catholique de Paris, and based on data from the European Social Survey 2014–2016, among 16 to 29 years-old Germans 47% were Christians (24% Protestant, 20% Catholic, 2% Eastern Orthodox and 1% other Christian), 7% were Muslims, 1% were of other religions, and 45% were not religious. The data was obtained from two questions, one asking "do you consider yourself as belonging to any particular religion or denomination?" to the full sample of 900 people, and the other one asking "which one?" to the sample who answered "yes".
- In 2017, a survey conducted by Pew Research Center found that 71% of German adult population consider themselves Christians when asking about their current religion (irrespective of whether they are officially members of a particular Christian church). The same survey shows that most of Christians in Germany are non-practicing (defined as people who identify as Christians, but attend church services no more than a few times per year). 5% of people questioned state they have a non-Christian religion and 24% are of no religion.
- According to a 2015 Worldwide Independent Network/Gallup International Association (WIN/GIA) poll, 34% of adult citizens said that they are religious, 42% said that they are not religious and 17% said that they are convinced atheists. 7% gave no response.
- The Eurobarometer Poll 2010 found that 44% of German citizens responded that "they believe there is a God", 25% responded that "they believe there is some sort of spirit or life force" and 27% responded that "they don't believe there is any sort of spirit, God or life force". 4% gave no response.

=== Religion by state ===
In 2016, the survey Politbarometer provided data regarding religion in each of the states of Germany for adults who are entitled to vote (18+), as reported in the table below. Christianity is the dominant religion of Western Germany, excluding Hamburg, which has a non-religious plurality. Northern Germany has traditionally been dominated by Protestantism, especially Lutheranism. The two northernmost provinces of Schleswig-Holstein and Lower Saxony have the largest percentage of self-reported Lutherans in Germany. Southern Germany has a Catholic majority, but also a significant Lutheran Protestant population (especially in Northern Württemberg and some parts of Baden and Franconia (Northern Bavaria)), in contrast to the almost entirely Protestant Northern Germany. Irreligion is predominant in Eastern Germany, which was the least religious region amongst 30 countries surveyed according to a study by the University of Chicago in 2012.

Distribution of religious and irreligious populations in Germany (2011 Church data)

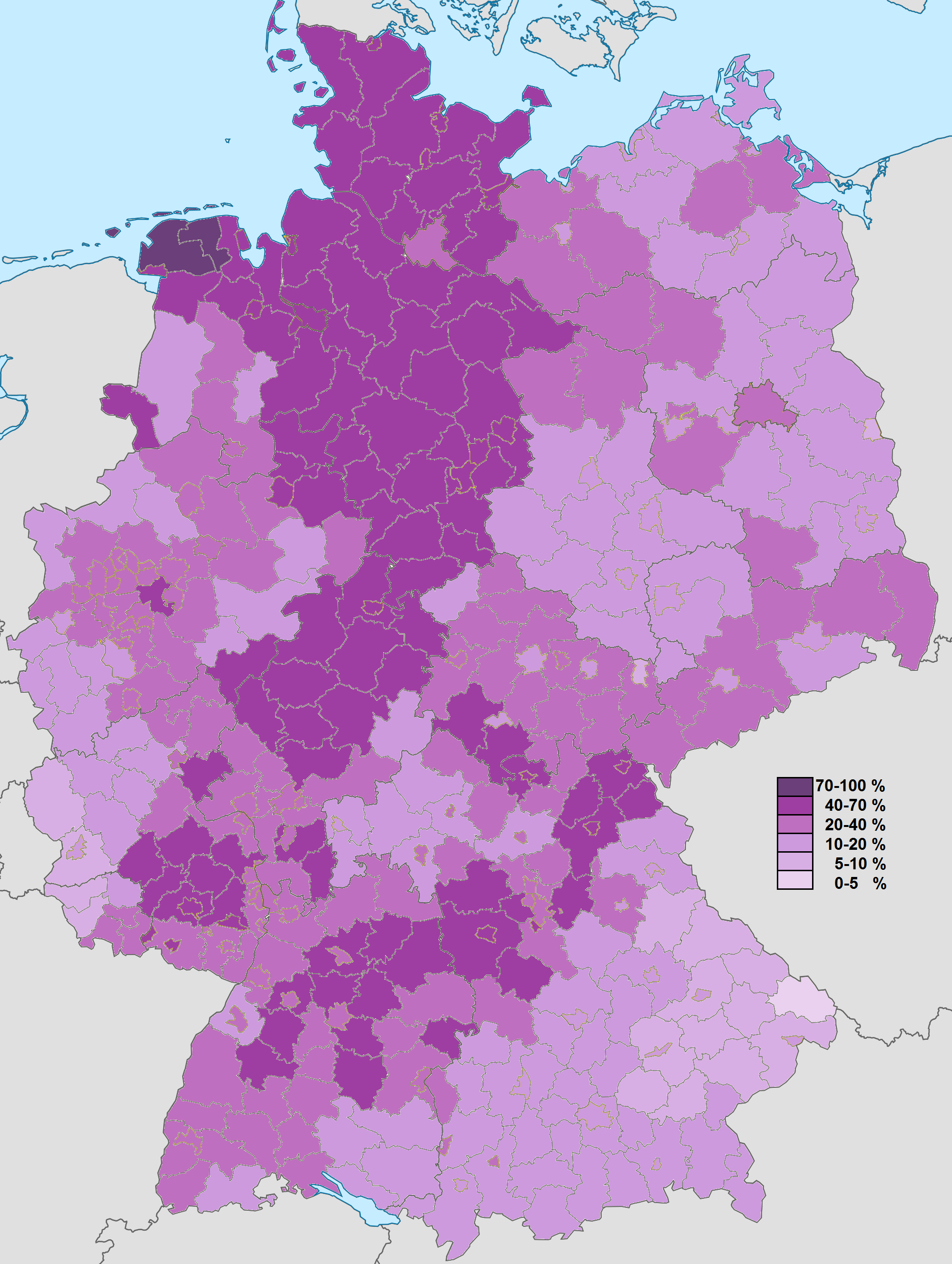
Protestants

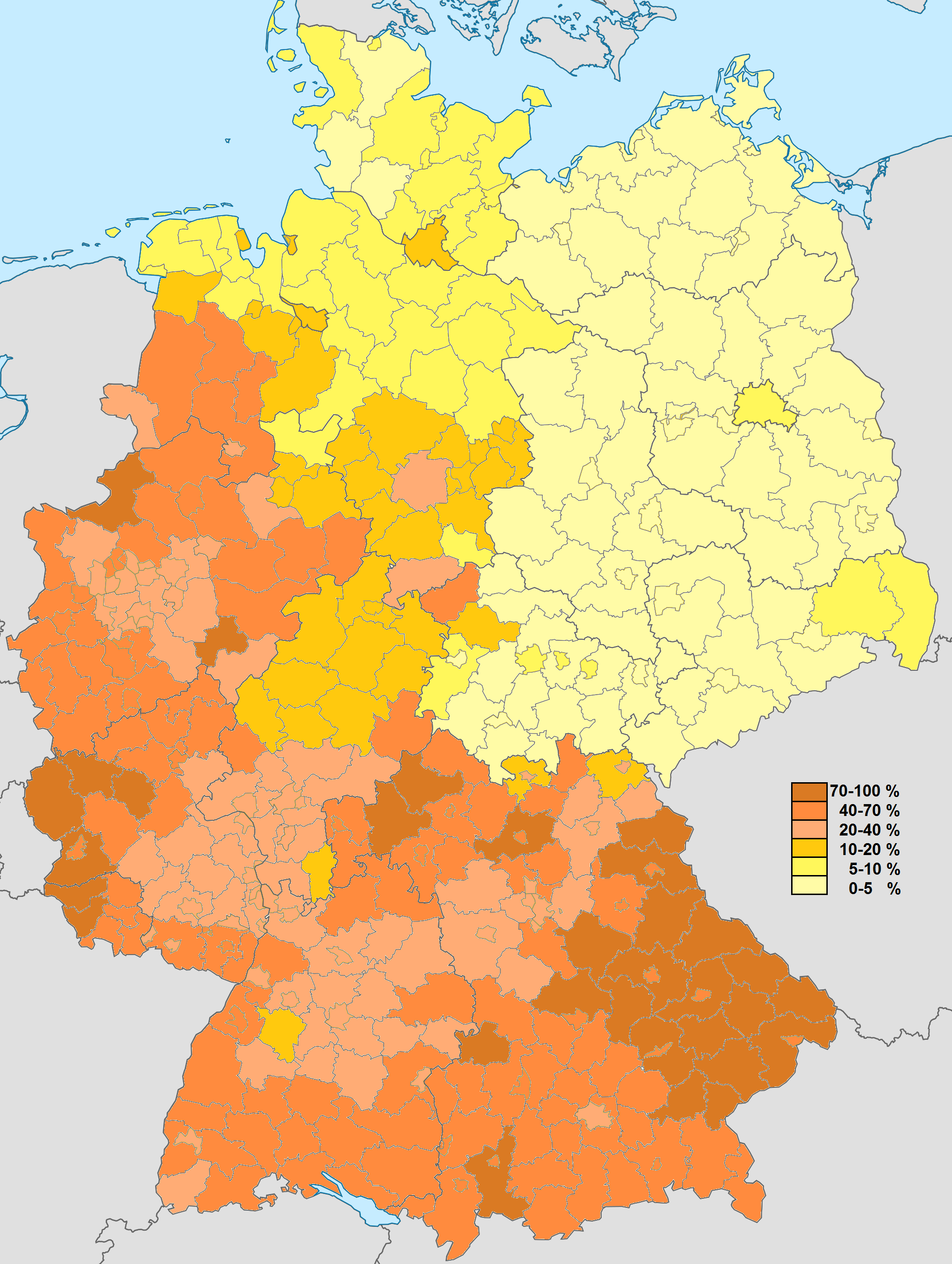
Catholics

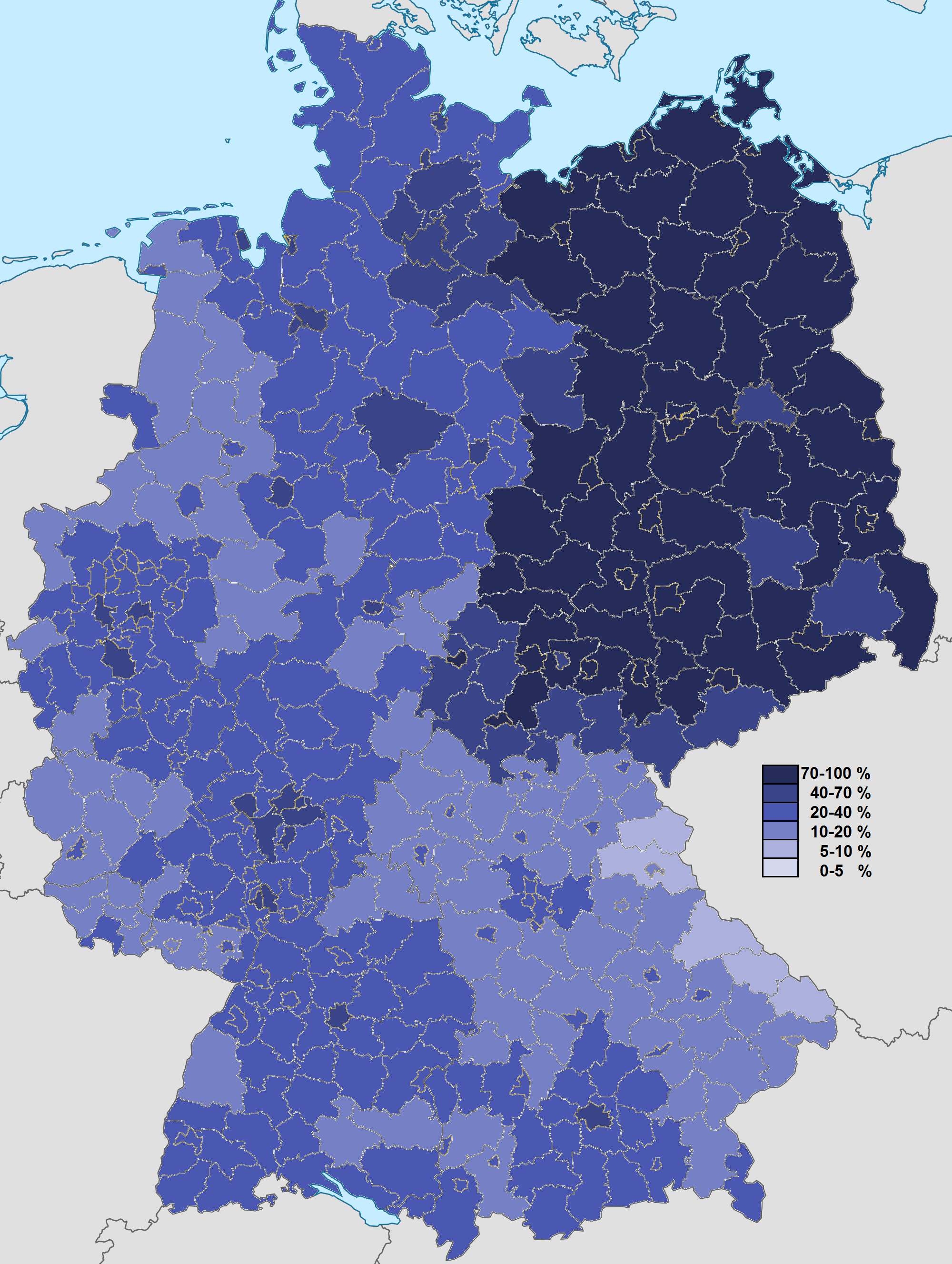
Non-religious and unaffiliated

Religion by state, 2016	Protestants	Catholics	Not religious	Muslims	Others
Baden-Württemberg	37.6%	40.6%	16.4%	2.5%	3.0%
Bavaria	23.4%	58.6%	15.6%	1.1%	1.3%
Brandenburg	24.9%	3.5%	69.9%	0.0%	1.5%
(Bremen (state)) Bremen	51.8%	7.8%	39.1%	0.0%	1.3%
former East Berlin	14.3%	7.5%	74.3%	1.5%	2.4%
former West Berlin	32.0%	12.4%	43.5%	8.5%	3.5%
Hamburg	34.3%	9.0%	44.1%	10.9%	1.7%
Hesse	50.2%	21.7%	22.2%	3.8%	2.1%
Lower Saxony	53.8%	18.7%	24.1%	2.5%	0.9%
Mecklenburg-Vorpommern	24.9%	3.9%	70.0%	0.3%	0.9%
North Rhine-Westphalia	30.9%	44.6%	18.1%	4.4%	2.0%
Rhineland-Palatinate	34.8%	42.4%	19.6%	1.0%	2.1%
Saarland	22.3%	68.1%	8.2%	1.4%	0.0%
Saxony	27.6%	4.0%	66.9%	0.3%	1.1%
Saxony-Anhalt	18.8%	5.1%	74.7%	0.3%	1.2%
Schleswig-Holstein	61.5%	3.2%	31.3%	2.2%	1.7%
Thuringia	27.8%	9.5%	61.2%	0.0%	1.5%
Germany	34.5%	32.2%	29.0%	2.5%	1.8%

=== Personal belief ===
According to a survey by the Pew Research Center in 2017, 60% of the German adult population believe in a God, 9% believe in a higher power or spiritual force and 27% do not believe in any God or higher power or spiritual force:-

Personal belief in Germany (2017)
Belief	% of population
Believe in a God (Monotheism)	60
Believe in a God, absolutely certain	10
Believe in a God, fairly certain	37
Believe in a God, not too certain	12
Believe in a God, not at all certain	1
Believe in a higher power or spiritual force (Ietsism)	9
Do not believe in any God or higher power or spiritual force (Atheism)	27
Don't know (Agnosticism) or refused to answer	4

== Christianity ==
At its foundation in 1871, about two-thirds of the population of the German Empire belonged to a state Protestant church; (Note: German Protestantism has been overwhelmingly a mixture of Lutheran, Reformed (i.e. Calvinist), and United (Lutheran & Reformed/Calvinist) churches, with Pentecostals, Methodists, and various other Protestants being only a recent development. Baptists and Anabaptists exist historically as a minority for centuries.) in 2024 the Protestant Church in Germany was the faith of 21.5%. In 1871, one-third of the population was Catholic; in 2024 its membership was 23.7%. Other faiths have existed in the state, but never achieved the demographic significance and cultural impact of these denominations.

As of 2025, Christianity, with around 38.7 million members, was the largest religion in Germany (46.3% of the population), although many of them take no active part in church life. About 1.5% of the population was Eastern Orthodox Christian in 2024, and about 1% followed other forms of Christianity (including other Protestant churches, Jehovah's Witnesses, The Church of Jesus Christ of Latter-day Saints, and others).

=== Protestantism ===
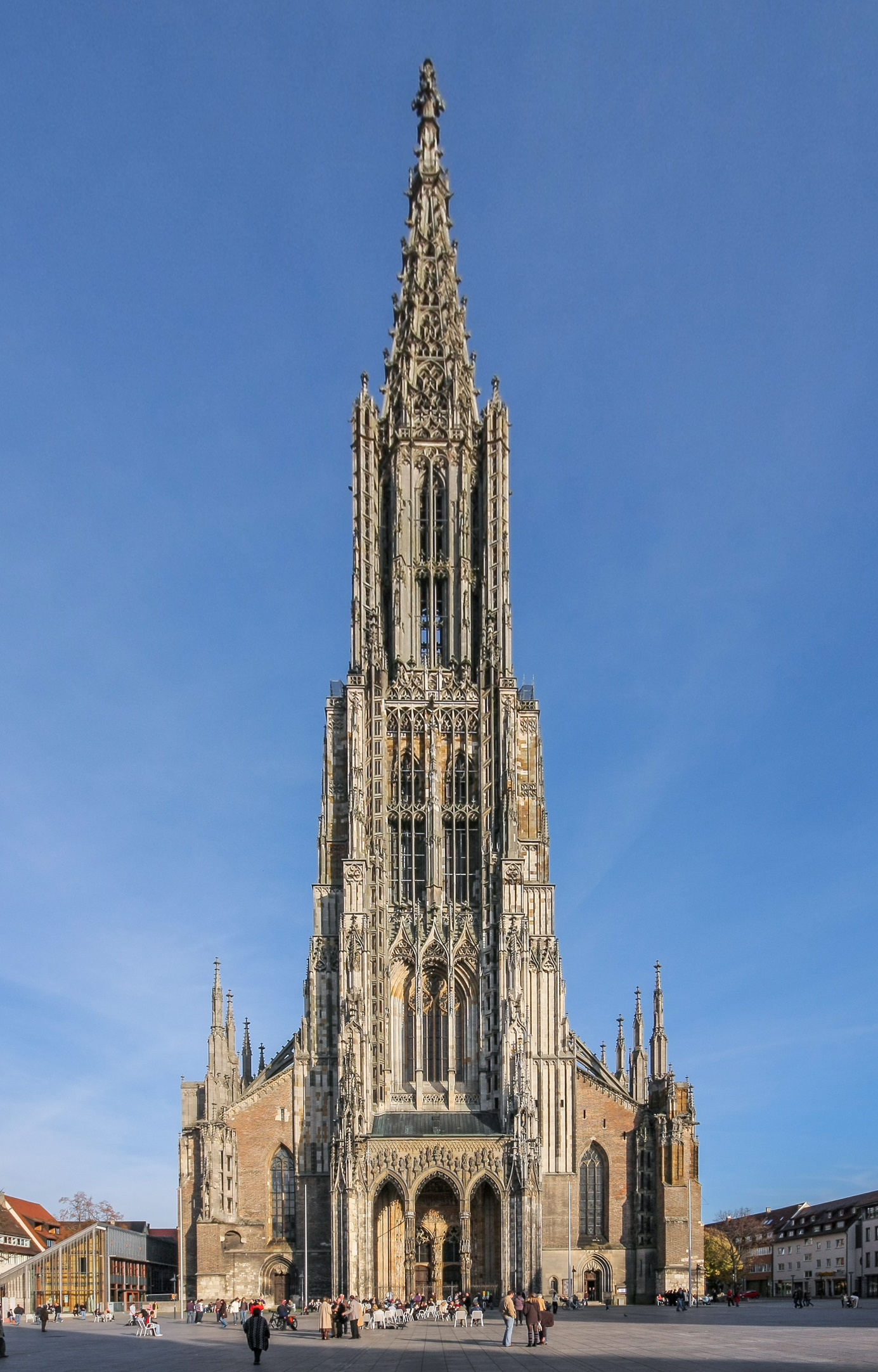
Ulm Minster is the tallest completed church building in the world.

- Protestant Church in Germany — 17,400,000 (2025) — 20.8% of the German population
- Free Baptist and Mennonite Groups — 290,000 (2007)
- Baptists (mostly Union of Evangelical Free Churches in Germany; see Baptists in Germany) — 80,195 (2020)
- Methodists — 52,031 (2016)
- Pentecostals (Bund Freikirchlicher Pfingstgemeinden) — 51,896 (2015)
- Mennonites — 51,771 (2022)
- Bund Freier evangelischer Gemeinden — 41,203 (2017)
- Seventh-day Adventist Church — 34,811 (2014)
- Independent Evangelical-Lutheran Church — 33,175 (2014)
- Independent African Churches — 30,000 (2005)
- Evangelical Lutheran Free Church — 1,300 (2017)

=== Catholicism ===
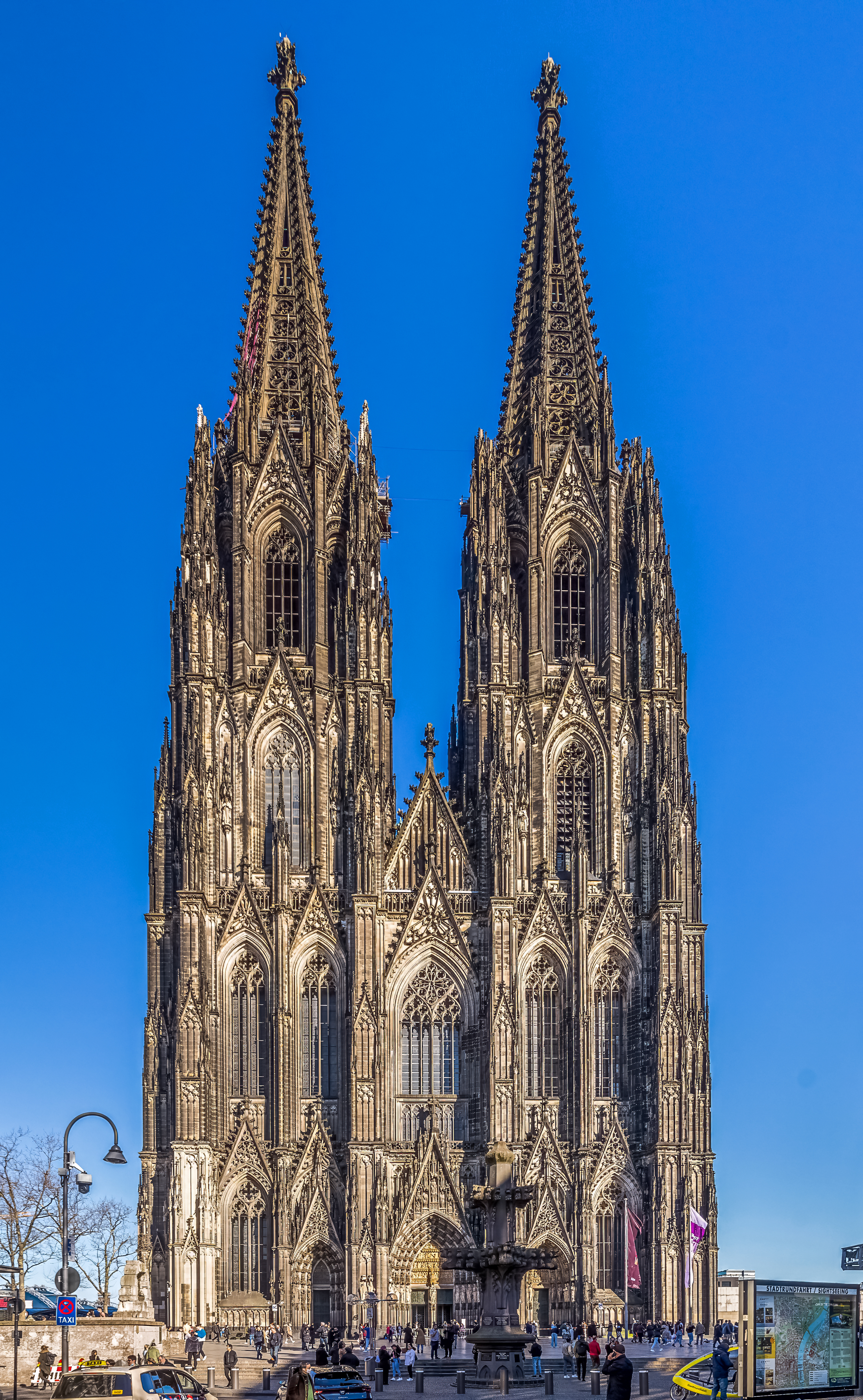
Cologne Cathedral is a World Heritage Site.

Catholic churches in full communion:

- Roman Catholic Church in Germany — 19,220,000 (2025) — 23% of the German population
- Maronite Church Catholics — 6,000

Church not in communion:

- Old Catholic Church — 15,715

=== Eastern Christianity ===
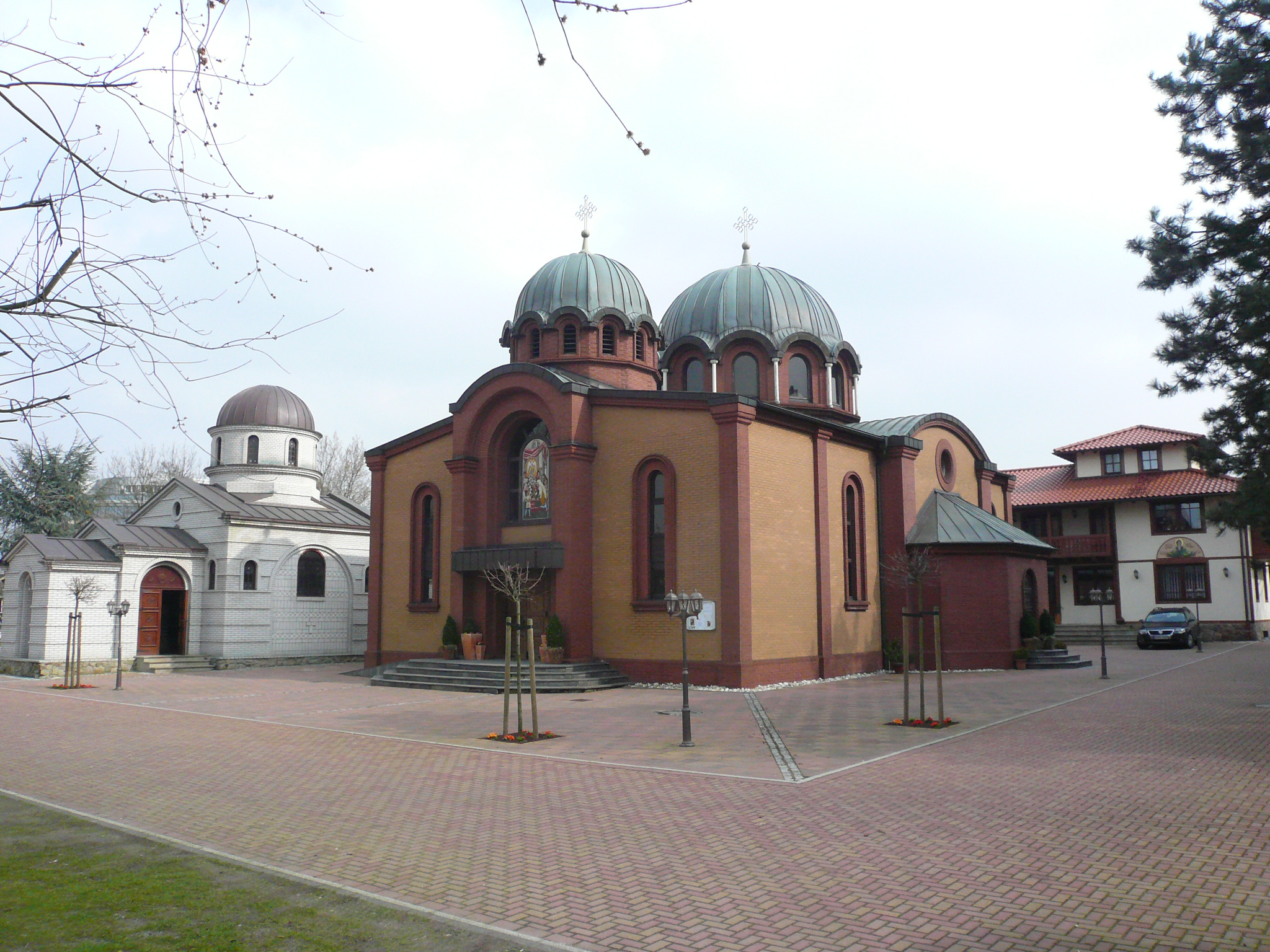
The Serbian Orthodox diocesan Cathedral of the Saint Sava in Düsseldorf

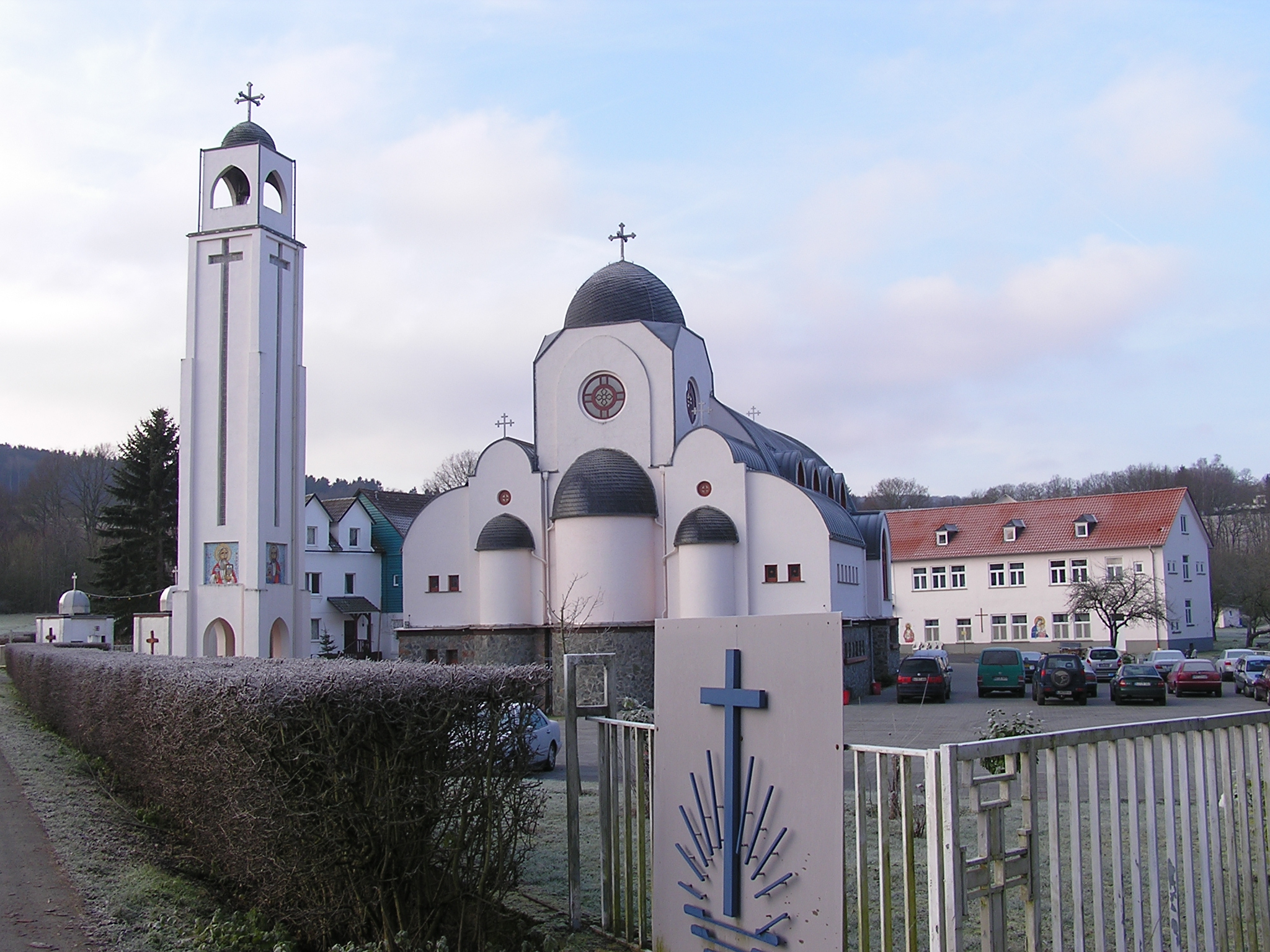
The Coptic Orthodox Monastery of St. Antonious in Waldsolms-Kröffelbach

- Orthodox Christians — around 1.6 million (1.9%)
  - Eastern Orthodox Churches
    - Churches of the Ecumenical Patriarchate of Constantinople — 570,000
      - Greek Orthodox Church — 410,000
      - Ukrainian Orthodox Eparchy of Western Europe — 10,000
      - Patriarchal Exarchate for Orthodox Parishes of the Russian Tradition in Western Europe — 200
    - Serbian Orthodox Church — 337,000
    - Russian Orthodox Church — 270,000
    - Romanian Orthodox Church — 150,000
    - Ukrainian Orthodox — 143,000
      - Ukrainian Orthodox Church - Kyiv Patriarchate — 110,000
      - Ukrainian Orthodox Church - Moscow Patriarchate — 33,000
    - Bulgarian Orthodox Church — 130,000
  - Oriental Orthodox Churches
    - Syriac Orthodox Church of Antioch — 100,000
    - Armenian Apostolic Church — 35,000
    - Coptic Orthodox Church — 22,000
    - Ethiopian Orthodox Tewahedo Church — 20,000
    - Eritrean Orthodox Tewahedo Church — 15,000
- Church of the East
  - Assyrian Church of the East — 10,000

=== Others ===
- New Apostolic Church — 341,202 (2015)
- Jehovah's Witnesses — 168,763
- The Church of Jesus Christ of Latter-day Saints — 38,739
- The Christian Community — 20,000 (2010)

== Minority Religious ==
=== Islam ===
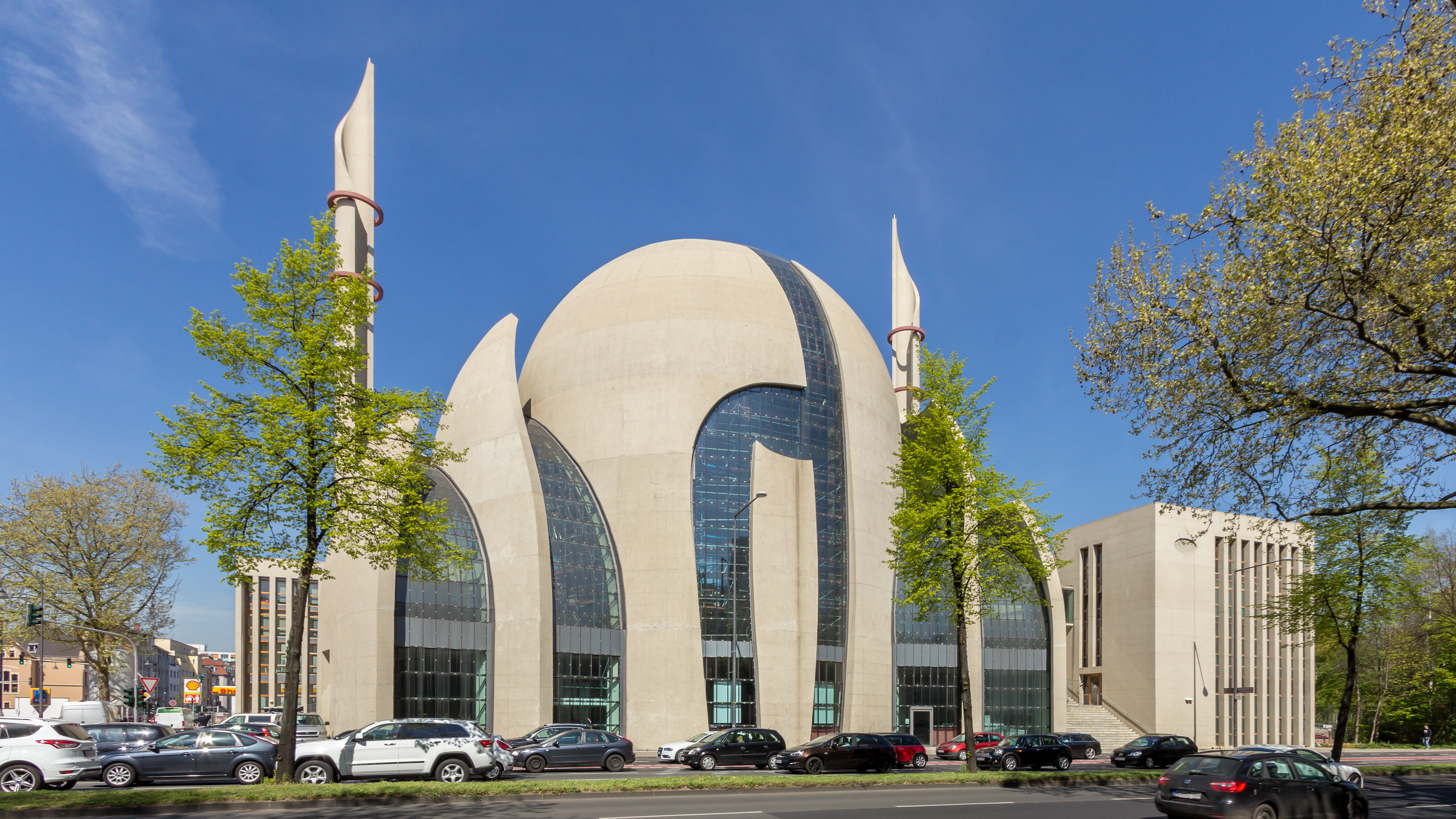
Cologne Central Mosque

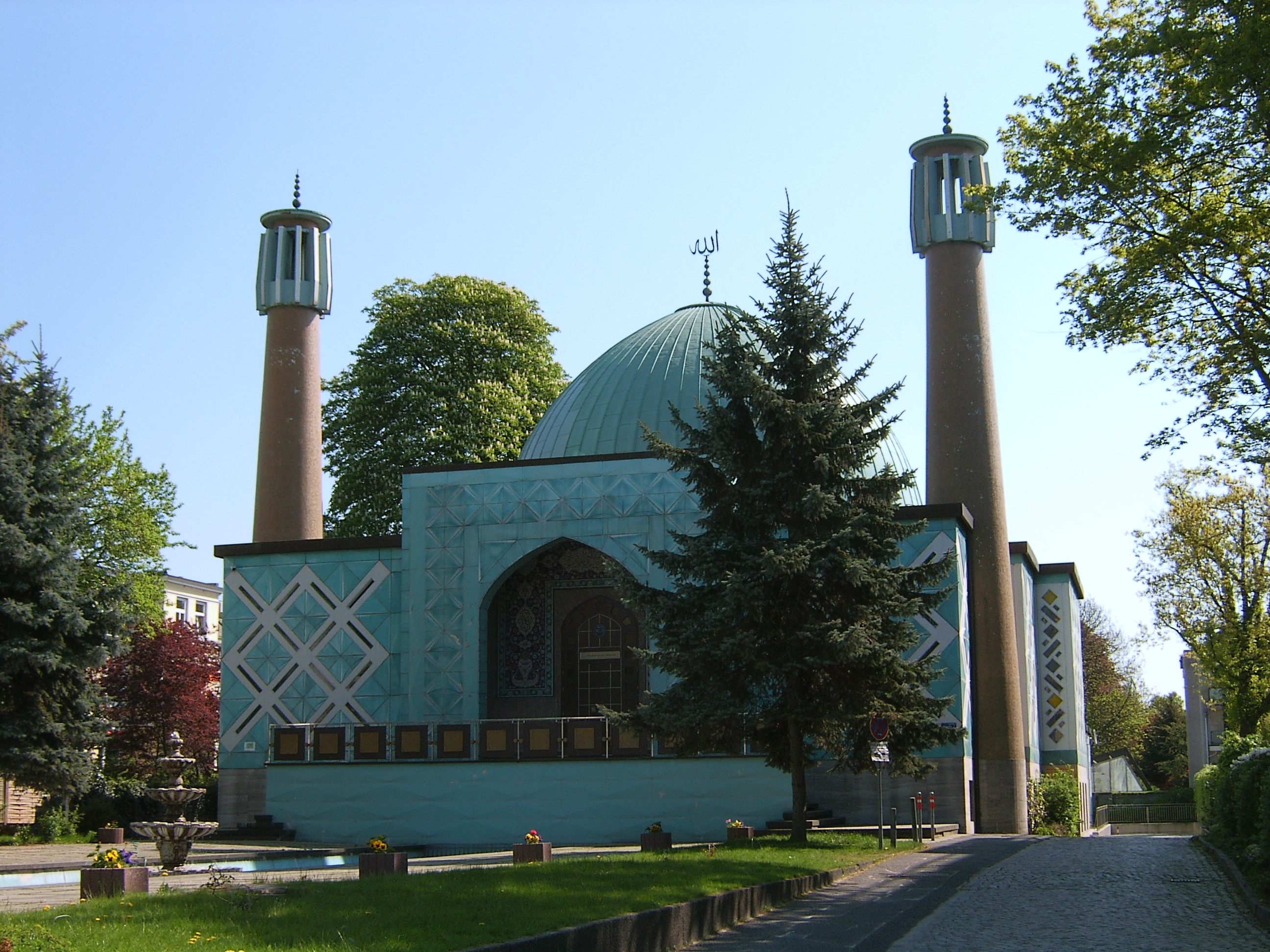
The Shia Islamic Centre Hamburg

Islam is the largest non-Christian religion in the country. There are between 3.2 and 4.7 million Muslims, around 5% of the population. The majority of Muslims in Germany are of Turkish origin, followed by those from Pakistan, countries of the former Yugoslavia, Arab countries, Iran, and Afghanistan. This figure includes the different denominations of Islam, such as Sunni, Shia, Ahmadi, and Alevi. Muslims first came to Germany as part of the diplomatic, military, and economic relations between Germany and the Ottoman Empire in the 18th century.

Between 2010 and 2016, the number of Muslims living in Germany increased from 3.3 million (4.1% of the population) to nearly 5 million (6.1%). The most important factor in the growth of Germany's Muslim population is immigration.

- Muslims — 3.2–4.7 million (5%):
  - Sunnis — 2,640,000
  - Alevis — 500,000
  - Twelver Shi'as — 225,500
  - Alawites — 70,000
  - Ahmadiyya Muslim Jamaat Deutschland K.d.ö.R. — 35,000
  - Sufis — 10,000
  - Salafis — 9,700
  - Ismailis — 1,900
  - Zaydis — 800
  - Ibadis — 270
  - Lahore Ahmadiyya Movement — 60

=== Buddhism ===
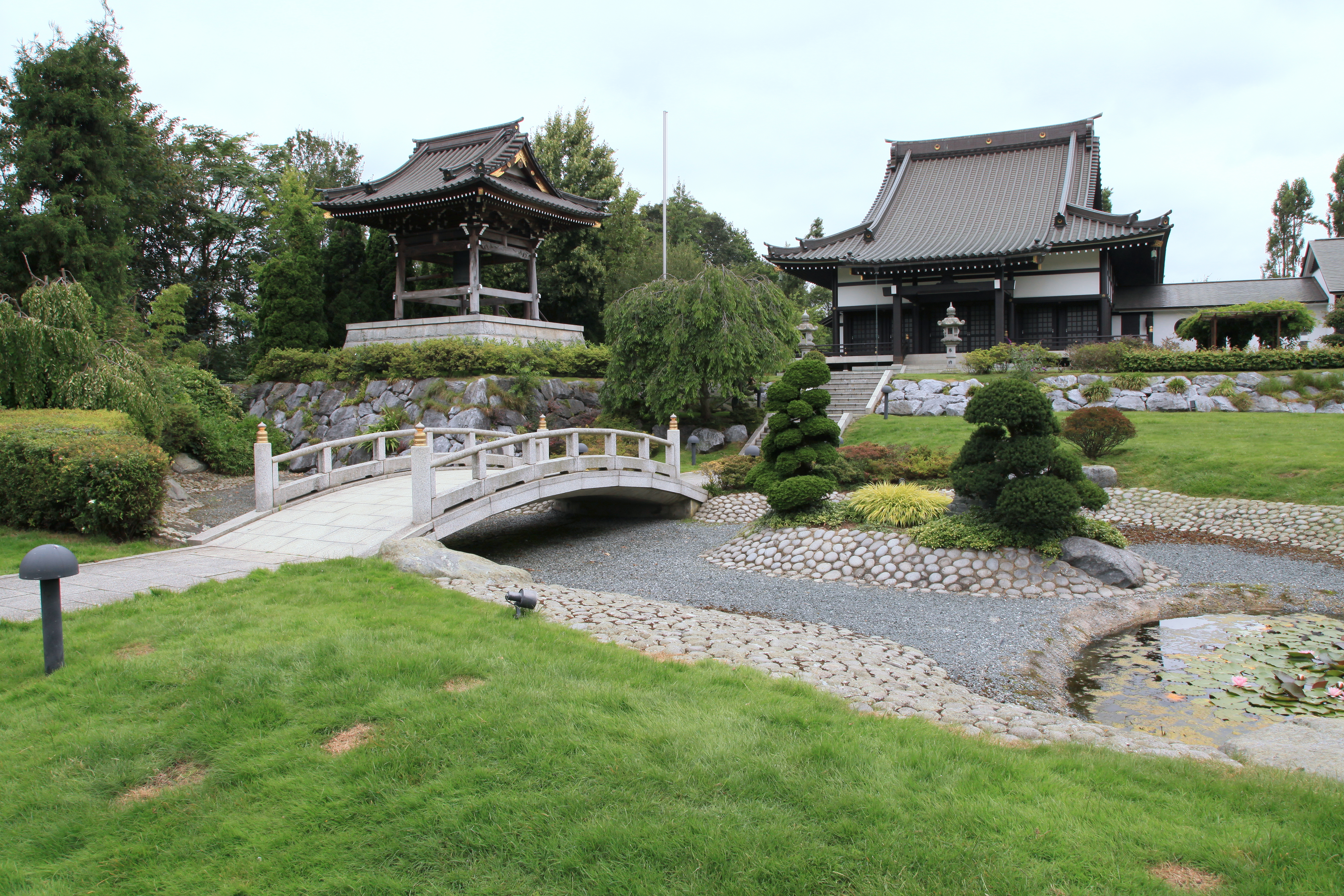
Japanese Buddhist temple in Düsseldorf

Buddhists are the third largest group of believers in Germany after different religious denominations of Christianity and Islam. There are around 270,000 Buddhists who are living in Germany.

Most of them are followers of the Buddhist school of Theravada especially from Sri Lanka. Furthermore, there are followers of Vajrayana, also referred to as Tibetan Buddhism as well as followers of Nichiren Buddhism mainly from Japan and Zen Buddhism from Japan, as well. Around 59,000 Buddhists are from Thailand who follow the school of Theravada and keep 48 temples in Germany and form one of the largest Buddhist community of Buddhists of Asian origin in Germany. A large portion of Buddhists in Eastern Germany are part of the Vietnamese community. Most of the different Buddhist schools and organisation in Germany are members of the non-profit association Deutsche Buddhistische Union e.V. (DBU).

=== Judaism ===
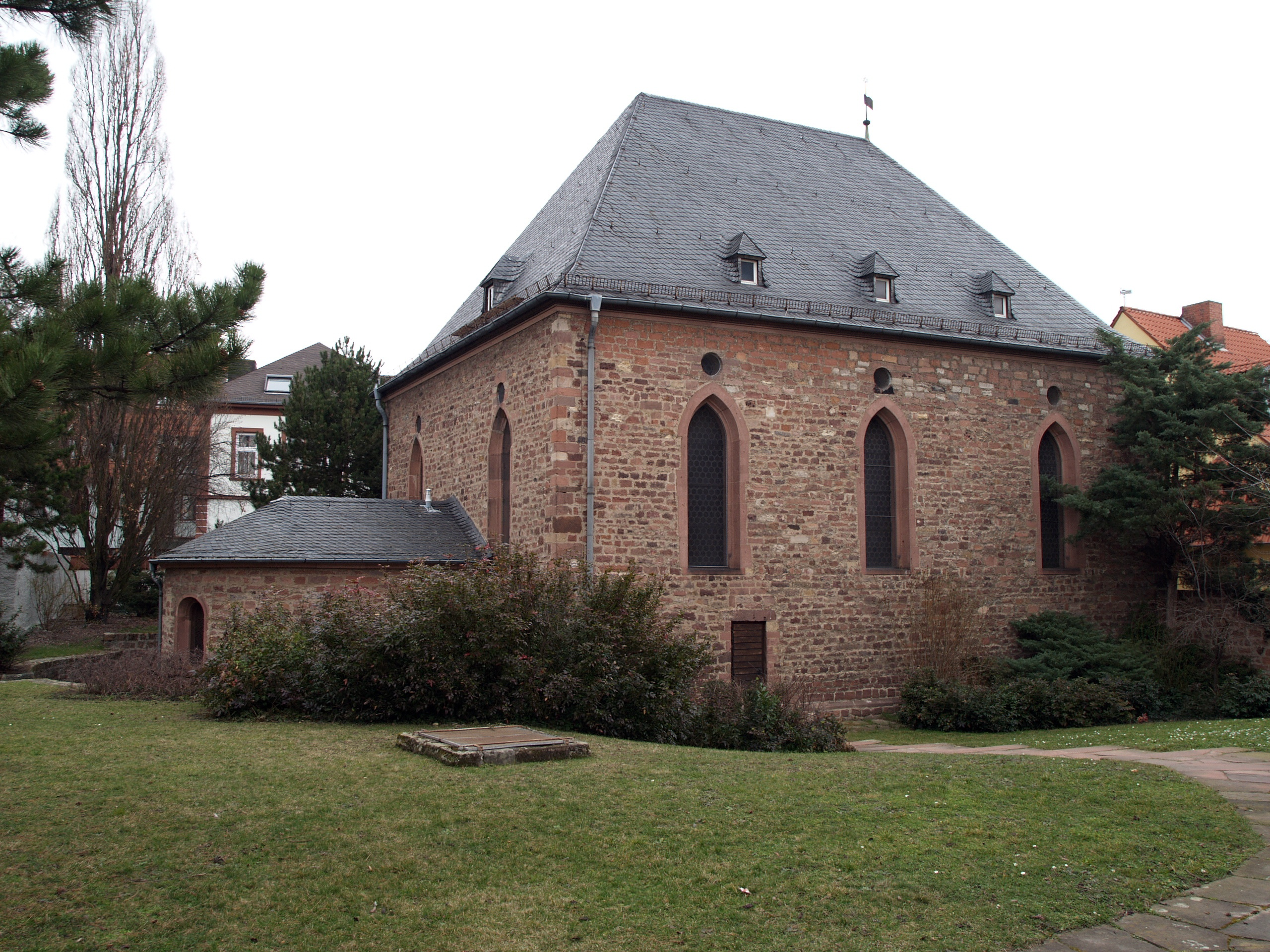
Worms Synagogue (originally built 1034) is the oldest extant synagogue in Germany.

Jewish communities in German speaking regions go back to the fourth century. In 1910, about 600,000 Jews lived in Germany. After Adolf Hitler assumed power in 1933, he began systematically persecuting Jews in Germany. Systematic mass murder of Jews in German-occupied Europe began with the 1941 invasion of the Soviet Union. By the end of World War II, four years later, around 6 million Jews had been killed by the National Socialist government.

About ninety thousand Jews from the former Eastern Bloc, mostly from ex-Soviet Union countries, have settled in Germany since the fall of the Berlin Wall. This is mainly due to a German government policy which effectively grants an immigration opportunity to anyone from the Commonwealth of Independent States and the Baltic states with Jewish heritage, and the fact that today's Germans are seen as more significantly accepting of Jews than many people in ex-Soviet regions.

Recently, antisemitic abuse against Jews in Germany has increased. The Central Council of Jews has urged Jewish Germans to avoid wearing their kippahs in public.

- Total religious Jews — 80,000-100,000 (0.1%)
- Jews whose religious status is not ascertained — 90,000. They come from Eastern Europe and have no membership in any Jewish community.
- Union of Progressive Jews in Germany — 5,000 members
- Central Council of Jews in Germany — 23 national associations of 108 communities comprising approximately 100,500 members in 2014.

=== Hinduism ===
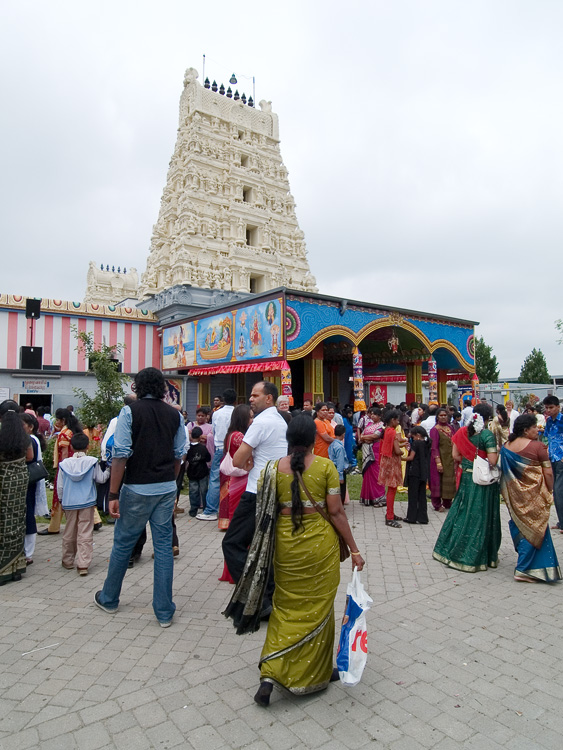
Sri Kamadchi Ampal Hindu temple in the city of Hamm

There are approximately 100,000 Hindus living in Germany. Most of them are Tamil Hindus from Sri Lanka (around 42,000 to 45,000); from India are around 35,000 to 40,000; of German or European origin are around 7,500 and around 5,000 Hindus are originally from Afghanistan. There are also Hindus from Nepal in Germany however this number is very low.

In addition, there are Hindus in Germany who are followers of New religious movements such as Hare Krishna movement, Bhakti yoga, and Transcendental Meditation. However, the total number of these followers in Germany is comparatively low.

== Other religions ==
=== Yazidism ===
There is a large Yazidi community in Germany, estimated to be numbering around 100,000 people. This makes the German Yazidi community one of the largest Yazidi communities in the Yazidi diaspora.

=== Sikhism ===
Between 10,000 and 20,000 Sikhs are living in Germany. Many Sikhs in Germany have their roots from Punjab region in the north of India, as well as from Pakistan and Afghanistan. Germany has the third highest Sikh population in Europe after United Kingdom and Italy. The city Frankfurt is also known to the Sikhs, as Mini Punjab, because of a great Sikh Population, residing there.

=== Druze Faith ===
In 2020, there were more than 10,000 Druze living in Germany, with the largest concentration in Berlin and North Rhine-Westphalia. The number of Druze has increased in recent years with thousands of Syrian refugees of the Syrian Civil War entered Germany to seek refugee status. Druze in Germany are mostly of Syrian descent, and they practice Druzism, a monotheistic religion encompasses aspects of Islam, Hinduism, Christianity, Judaism and Greek philosophy, amongst other influences.

=== Baháʼí Faith ===
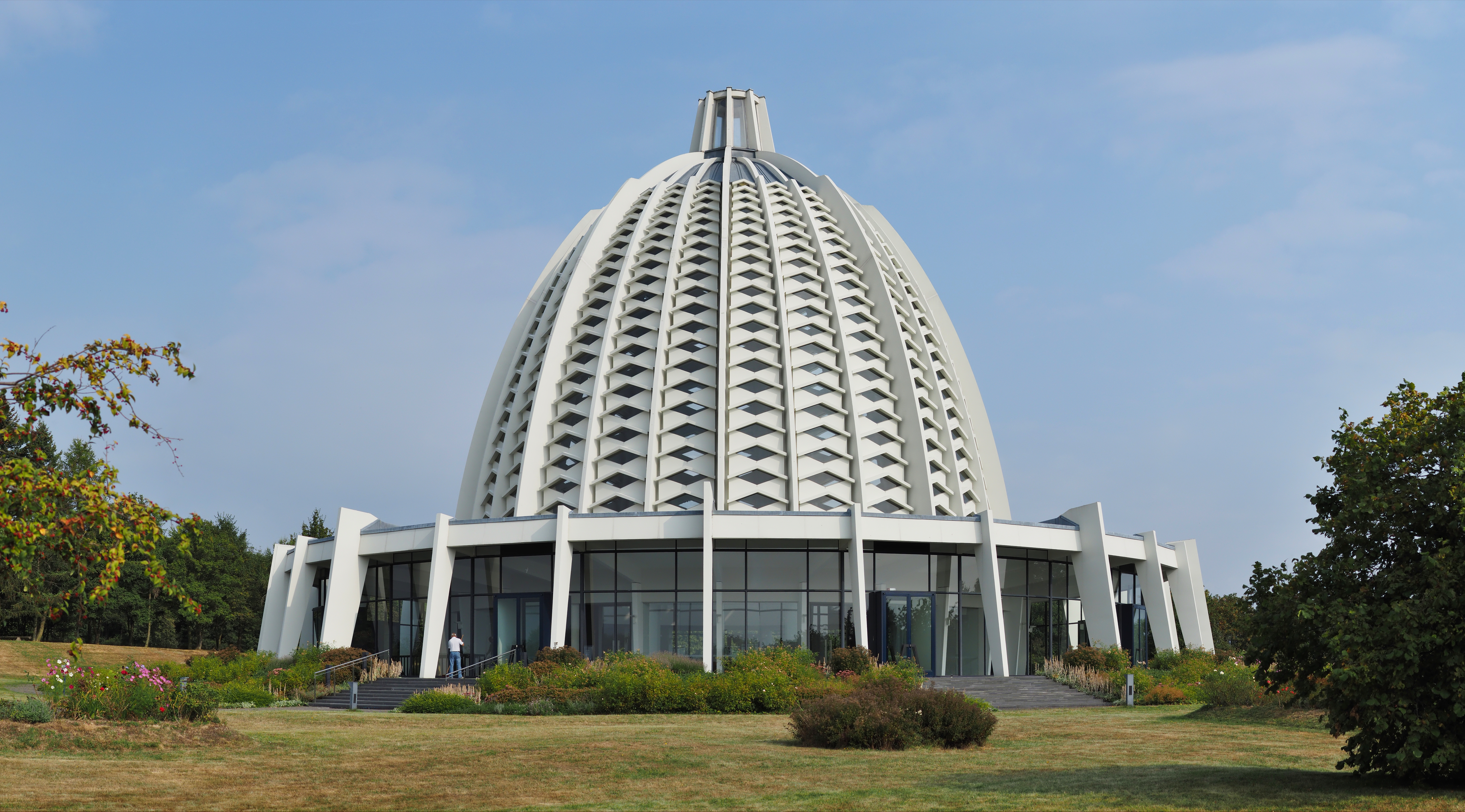
Bahá'í House of Worship in Langenhain near Frankfurt

A 1997–8 estimate is of 4000 Bahá'ís in Germany. In 2002 there were 106 Local Spiritual Assemblies. The 2007-8 German Census using sampling estimated 5–6,000 Bahá'ís in Germany. Following the German reunification in 1989–91 the Federal Constitutional Court of Germany handed down a judgment affirming the status of the Bahá'í Faith as a religion in Germany. Continued development of youth oriented programs included the Diversity Dance Theater (see Oscar DeGruy) which traveled to Albania in February 1997. Udo Schaefer et al.'s 2001 Making the Crooked Straight was written to refute a polemic supported by the Protestant Church in Germany written in 1981. Since its publication the Protestant Church in Germany has revised its own relationship to the German Bahá'í Community. Former member of the federal parliament Ernst Ulrich von Weizsaecker commended the ideas of the German Bahá'í community on social integration, which were published in a statement in 1998, and Chancellor Helmut Kohl sent a congratulatory message to the 1992 ceremony marking the 100th Anniversary of the Ascension of Bahá'u'lláh.

=== Neopaganism ===
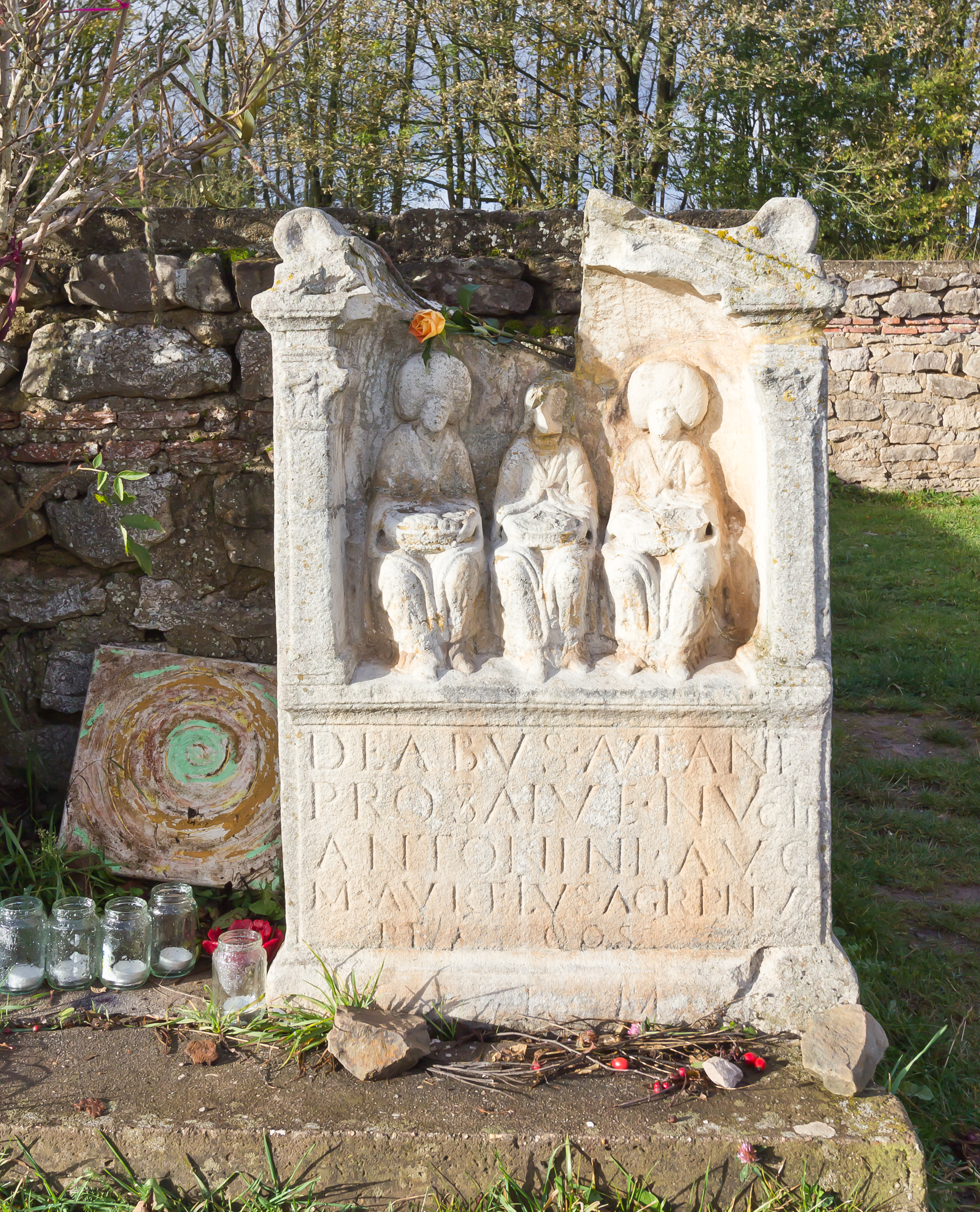
Matronen altar with offerings in Nettersheim

Neopagan religions have been public in Germany at least since the 19th century. Nowadays Germanic Heathenism (Germanisches Heidentum, or Deutschglaube for its peculiar German forms) has many organisations in the country, including the Germanische Glaubens-Gemeinschaft (Communion of Germanic Faith), the Heidnische Gemeinschaft (Heathen Communion), the Verein für germanisches Heidentum (Association for Germanic Heathenry), the Nornirs Ætt, the Eldaring, the Artgemeinschaft, the Armanen-Orden, and Thuringian Firne Sitte.

Other Pagan religions include the Celto-Germanic Matronenkult grassroots worship practiced in Rhineland, Celtoi (a Celtic religious association), and Wiccan groups. As of 2006, 1% of the population of North Rhine-Westphalia adheres to new religions or esoteric groups.

=== Sekten and new religious movements ===
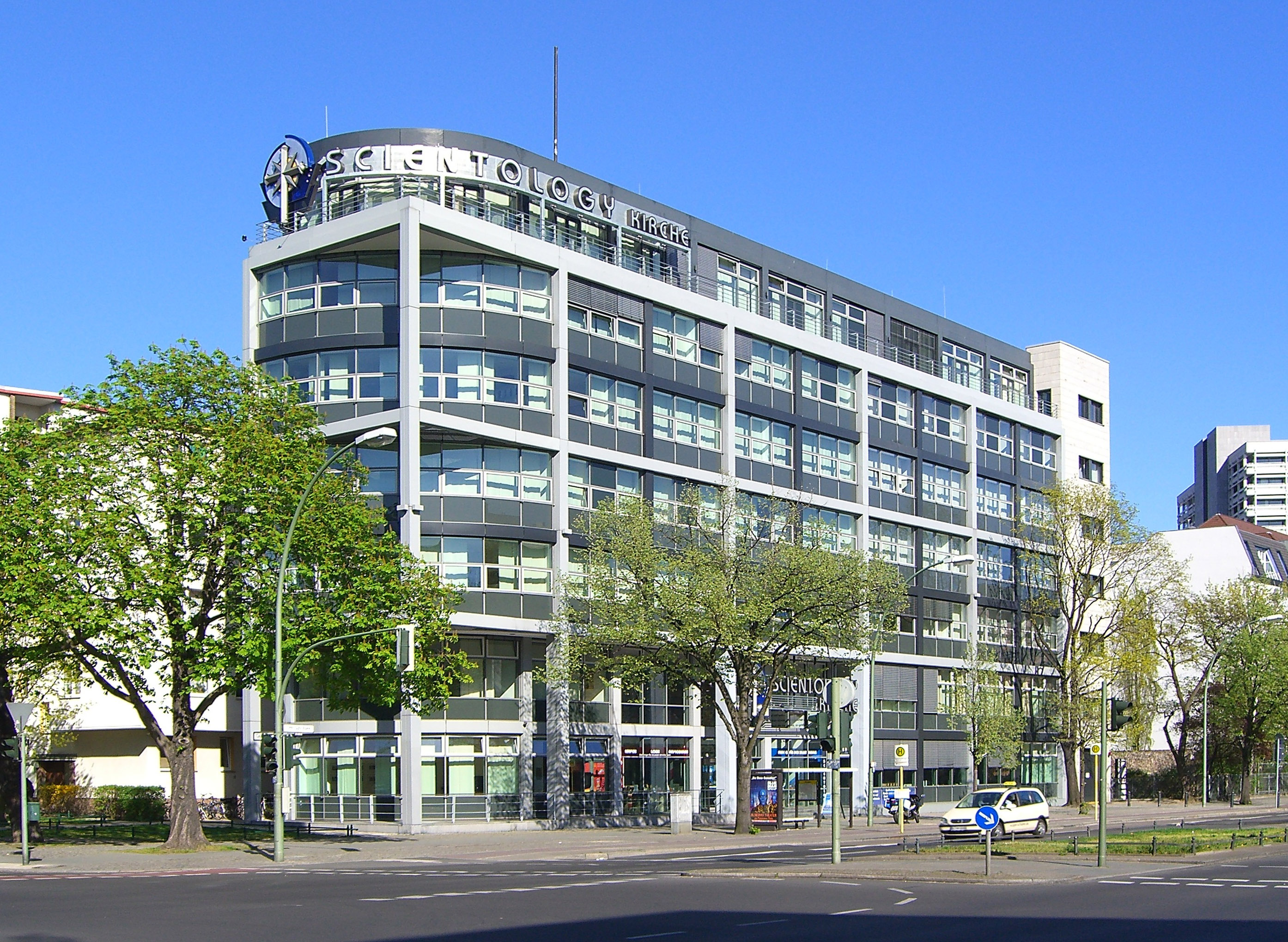
Church of Scientology in Berlin

The German government provides information and warnings about cults, sects, and new religious movements. In 1997, the parliament set up a commission for Sogenannte Sekten und Psychogruppen (literally "so-called sects and psychic groups"), which in 1998 delivered an extensive report on the situation in Germany regarding NRMs. In 2002, the Federal Constitutional Court upheld the governmental right to provide critical information on religious organisations being referred to as Sekte, but stated that "defamatory, discriminating, or falsifying accounts" were illegal.

When classifying religious groups, the Roman Catholic Church and the Protestant Church in Germany (EKD) use a three-level hierarchy of "churches", "free churches" and Sekten:

1. Kirchen (churches) is the term generally applied to the Roman Catholic Church, the Protestant Church in Germany's member churches (Landeskirchen), and the Orthodox Churches. The churches are not only granted the status of a non-profit organisation, but they have additional rights as statutory corporations (German: Körperschaft des öffentlichen Rechts), which means they have the right to employ civil servants (Beamter), do official duties, or issue official documents.
2. Freikirchen (free churches) is the term generally applied to Protestant organisations outside of the EKD, e.g. Baptists, Methodists, independent Lutherans, Pentecostals, Seventh-day Adventists and others. However, the Old Catholics can be referred to as a free church as well. The free churches are not only granted the tax-free status of a non-profit organisation, but many of them have additional rights as statutory corporations.
3. Sekten is the term for religious groups which do not see themselves as part of a major religion (but perhaps as the only real believers of a major religion).

Every Protestant Landeskirche (church whose canonical jurisdiction extends over one or several states, or Länder) and Catholic episcopacy has a Sektenbeauftragter (Sekten delegate) from whom information about religious movements may be obtained.

== No religion ==
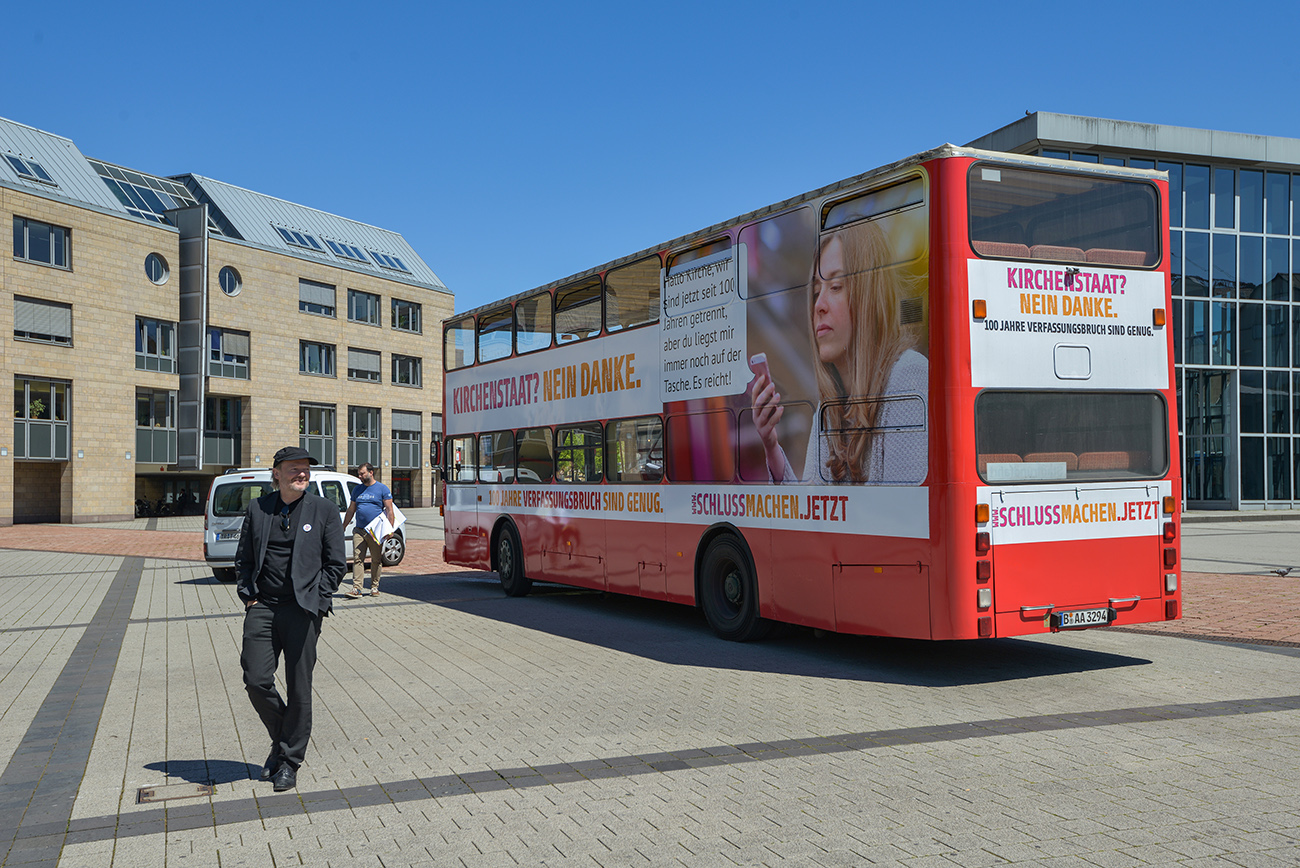
Secular bus campaign by Giordano Bruno Foundation, 2019.

As of 2025, 40.1 million or 48.1% of the Germans are irreligious. Before World War II, about two-thirds of the German population was Protestant and one-third was Roman Catholic. In the north and northeast of Germany especially, Protestants dominated. In the former West Germany between 1945 and 1990, which contained nearly all of Germany's historically Catholic areas, Catholics have had a small majority since the 1980s. Due to a generation behind the Iron Curtain, Protestant areas of the former states of Prussia were much more affected by secularism than predominantly Catholic areas. The predominantly secularised states, such as Hamburg or the East German states, used to be Lutheran or United Protestant strongholds. Because of this, Protestantism is now strongest in two strips of territory in the former West Germany, one extending from the Danish border to Hesse, and the other extending northeast–southwest across southern Germany.

There is a non-religious majority in Hamburg, Hessen, Bremen, Berlin, Brandenburg, Schleswig-Holstein, Saxony, Saxony-Anhalt, Thuringia and Mecklenburg-Vorpommern. In the eastern state of Saxony-Anhalt, only 12.8% belong to the two main denominations of the country. This is the state where Martin Luther was born and lived most of his life.

In what used to be East Germany both religious observance and affiliation are much lower than in the rest of the country, after forty years of Communist rule. The government of the German Democratic Republic encouraged a state atheist worldview through institutions such as Jugendweihen (youth consecrations) — secular coming-of-age ceremonies akin to Christian confirmation which all young people were encouraged to attend. The number of christenings, religious weddings, and funerals is also lower than in the West.

According to a survey among German youths (aged 12 to 24) in the year 2006, most German youths are non-religious (51%). 30% of German youths stated belief in a personal god, 19% believe in some kind of supernatural power, 23% share agnostic views and 28% are atheists.

== Freedom of religion ==
In 2023, Freedom House scored Germany 4 out of 4 for religious freedom.

== See also ==
- Religion by country
- Heathenry (new religious movement)
- History of Germany
- Roman Catholicism (especially the Catholic Church in Germany)
- Protestantism (especially Protestantism in Germany and the Protestant Church in Germany)
  - Lutheranism
  - Calvinism
  - United and uniting churches (especially the Prussian Union of churches)
  - Landeskirche and Freikirche
  - Anabaptism
  - Martin Luther and the Protestant Reformation
  - Max Weber (the Protestant work ethic)
- State atheism in the former East Germany
