= Irreligion in Germany =

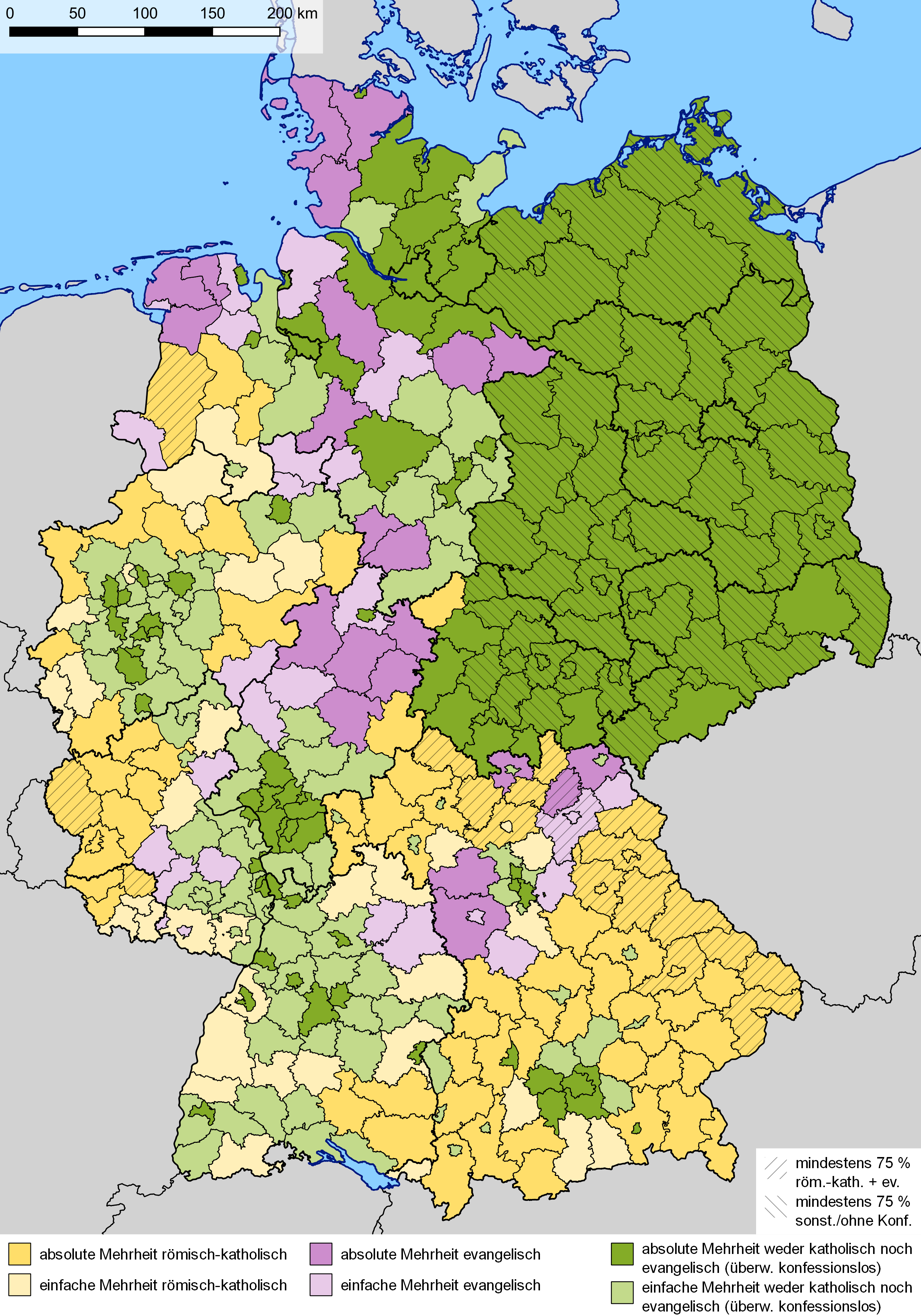
Majority religion according to the 2022 census Protestant Catholic Unaffiliated Dark: absolute majority (>50%) Light: relative majority (<50%)

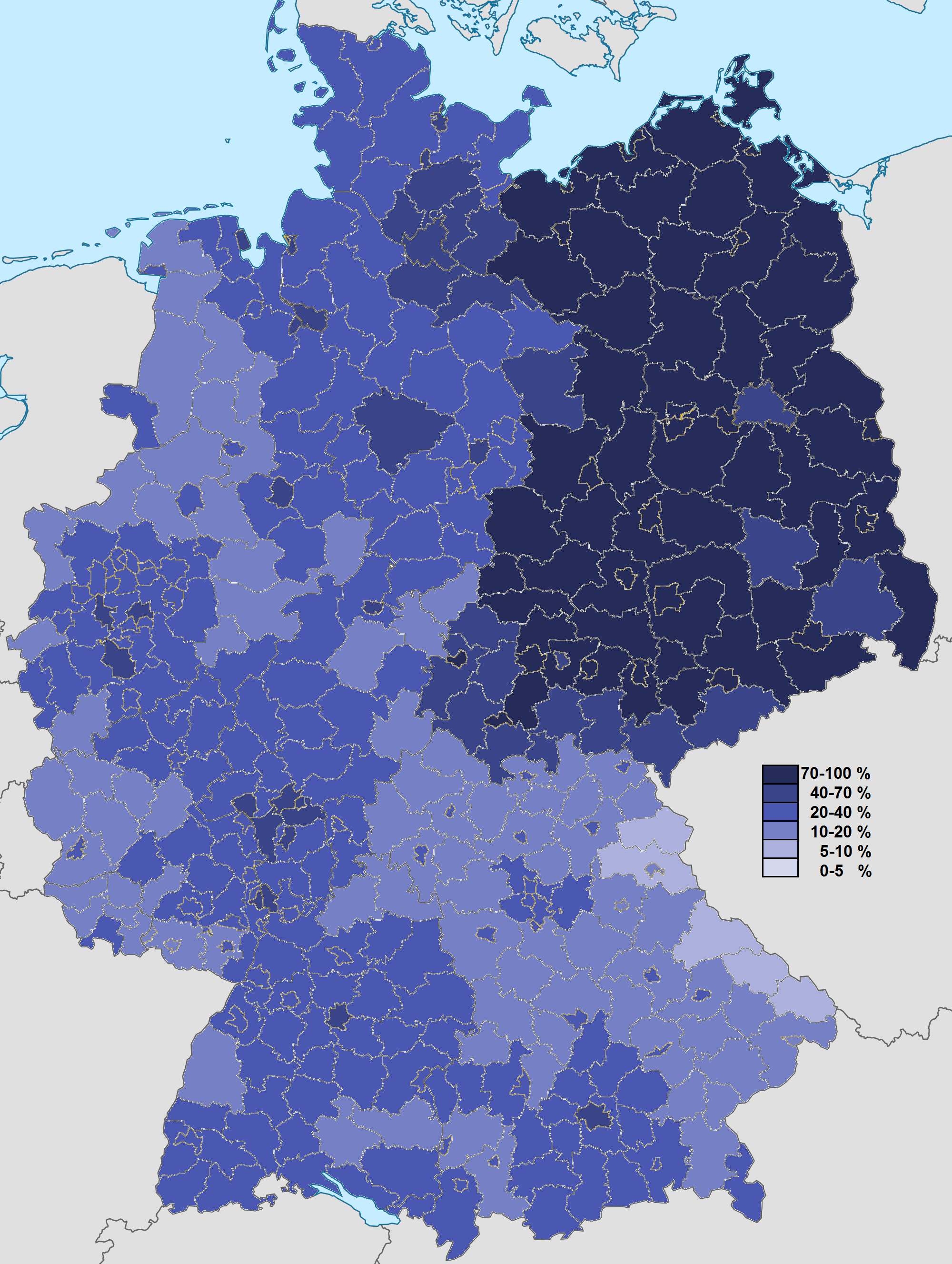
Non-religious population according to the 2011 census (including other religions and not specified)

Irreligion is prevalent in Germany. In a time of near-universal adoption of Christianity, Germany was an intellectual centre for European freethought and humanist thinking, whose ideas spread across Europe and the world in the Age of Enlightenment. Later, religious tradition in Germany was weakened by the twin onslaughts of Nazi rule during World War II and that of the Socialist Unity Party in East Germany during the Cold War. In common with most other European societies, a period of secularisation also continued in the decades that followed. While today Christianity remains prevalent in the west of Germany, in the east relatively few Germans identify with any religion whatsoever.

As of the end of 2025, approximately 48% of Germans are irreligious, with a much higher concentration of irreligious citizens in the former East Germany. Eastern Germany, which was under communist rule, is one of the least religious regions in the world. Pew Research Center's 2018 report found that when grouping all non-Muslims, 36% of Germans selected the option of 'Do not believe in God'.

== History ==
One early irreligious German philosopher was Ludwig Feuerbach, who developed a theory of anthropological materialism in his book The Essence of Christianity. Feuerbach's work influenced contemporaries Karl Marx and Friedrich Engels in their writings against religion. The Freethought movement gained support in Germany during the 19th century. The secular coming of age ceremony Jugendweihe was developed in the 1850s, and Ludwig Büchner founded the German Freethinkers League in 1881.

After its unification in 1871, the German Empire sought to resist attempts by the Catholic Church to impose its authority over the empire's sovereignty. During the Kulturkampf, Germany passed several laws that limited the power of religious authorities over the state.

The Weimar Republic guaranteed freedom of religion when its constitution came into effect in 1919. After the Nazi Party took control of the country in 1933, constitutional protection was ignored in Nazi Germany.

After World War II, Germany was divided into West Germany and East Germany. While West Germany allowed for religious protection, East Germany enacted a system of state atheism and persecuted Christian groups for the first several years of its existence, resulting in East Germany having a much higher rate of irreligion than West Germany. This divide persisted after German reunification and still exists today.

== Demographics ==
A 2023 estimate shows that 46.2% of the German population were non-confessional and not members of any religious group. Christianity still has a notable presence in Western Germany, although the majority of the population in the northern states of Hamburg, Bremen and Schleswig-Holstein are not registered members of the main Catholic and Protestant churches. When taken overall, Germany is one of the least religious countries in the world.

The Cambridge Companion to Atheism estimated that in 2004 there were between thirty-three million and forty million non-believers in Germany. As of 2009, much more Germans are non-believers in Eastern Germany than Western Germany. Eastern Germany, which was under communist rule, is one of the least religious regions in the world. An explanation for this, popular in other regions, is the state atheist policy of the German Democratic Republic's Socialist Unity Party of Germany. However, the promotion of atheism existed only for the first few years. After that, the state allowed churches to have a relatively high level of autonomy. Atheism is embraced by Germans of all ages, although irreligion is particularly common among younger Germans. One study in September 2012 was unable to find a single person under the age of 28 who was certain that a Deity exists. A 2017 Pew Research Center survey in Germany found that less Protestants believed in God with absolute certainty than Catholics.

State	Non-religious (2011)	Percentage of the population
Saxony-Anhalt	1,805,960	79.6%
Mecklenburg-Vorpommern	1,229,350	77.5%
Brandenburg	1,858,370	76.2%
Saxony	2,908,420	72.6%
Thuringia	1,433,690	66.0%
Berlin	2,045,340	62.6%
Hamburg	827,180	48.9%
Bremen	251,770	38.9%
Schleswig-Holstein	955,190	34.3%
Germany	26,265,880	33.0%
Hesse	1,610,090	27.1%
Lower Saxony	1,992,670	25.8%
North Rhine-Westphalia	3,930,270	22.5%
Baden-Württemberg	2,248,600	21.6%
Bavaria	2,317,860	18.8%
Rhineland-Palatinate	720,000	18.1%
Saarland	131,120	13.2%

== See also ==
- Demographics of Germany
- Freedom of religion in Germany
- Humanistischer Verband Deutschlands
- Party of Humanists
- Religion in Germany
