= A. P. Førster =

Danish Baptist missionary (1819–1889)

Andreas Peter Førster
- Born: 1819; Copenhagen, Denmark
- Died: 1889; Kansas, United States
- Occupation(s): Preacher, missionary
- Movement: Baptist Church

Andreas Peter (A. P.) Førster (1819–1889) was a pioneer Danish Baptist pastor and missionary who contributed to the early growth of the Baptist church in Denmark as well as to its establishment in Sweden.

== Life ==
Andreas Peter Førster was born in Copenhagen, Denmark in 1819. As a young man in 1837, Førster traveled to Hamburg, Germany. His exposure to the growing Christian revival came when he met Johann Gerhard Oncken, a German Baptist preacher known as "the father of Continental Baptists."

Førster went to the Primitive Evangelical Baptists in London, who baptized him in 1843. There he studied Calvinist theology and stayed for several years as a member of the Buttesland Street Chapel. With the support of the church, as part of the Strict Baptist Convention, he later returned to Copenhagen as a missionary with his English wife.

On 21 September 1848, in Vallersvik in Norra Halland, Sweden, Førster performed the first Baptist baptisms in Sweden. Swedish Baptist pastor F. O. Nilsson, who had been baptized by Oncken the previous year, invited Førster there to baptize his wife, brothers, and two others. The ceremony was followed the same evening by the founding of the first Swedish Baptist congregation (and first free church in the country) in Nilsson's brother's home, Borekullastugan.

Førster remained in Denmark for some time, serving as a missionary to the new, struggling Baptist churches there. He also served as the head of the Danish Baptist Union, which was part of a larger German-Danish Baptist organization. In the late 1860s, Førster emigrated to the United States, where he worked as a doctor. He died in Kansas in 1889.

== See also ==
- Baptist Union of Denmark
