= Gottfried Wilhelm Lehmann =

German Baptist pastor (1799–1882)

- Born: 23 October 1799; Hamburg, Germany
- Died: 21 February 1882 (aged 82); Berlin, Germany
- Occupation: Baptist pastor
- Spouse: Maria Johanna Eleonora Eichner (m. 1827)
- Children: 7, including Joseph Lehmann

Gottfried Wilhelm Lehmann (23 October 1799 – 21 February 1882) was a German copper engraver and later founder and pastor of the first Baptist congregation in Berlin. Along with Johann Gerhard Oncken and Julius Köbner, together known as the Baptist "cloverleaf" (Kleeblatt), he is one of the founding fathers of German Baptists.

== Life ==
Lehmann was born in Hamburg, but was raised in Berlin, where his father Gottfried Arnold Lehmann (1766–1819) had been working since 1800 as a copper engraver. In the hope of one day being able to take over the business of his hitherto childless uncle, he began an apprenticeship as a saddler in his uncle's workshop in Leer, East Frisia. He found contact with a conventicle of young men during these years and attended revivalist edification meetings held in various private homes. His notebook contains a number of names from the circle of friends and members of the Brethren church, including that of the Moravian Brethren preacher Jakob Friedrich Plessing.

The hope of taking over his uncle's business fell through for various reasons. Lehmann returned to Berlin and in 1819 began training as an engraver and lithographer under Johann Gottfried Schadow at the Berlin Academy of Arts. His religious home was initially the Bohemian Lutheran congregation in the Bethlehem Church in Berlin's Friedrichstadt, of whose preacher Johannes Jaenicke he made a portrait engraving. Through his wife Maria Johanna Eleonora, née Eichner, whom he married on 26 October 1827, Lehmann became acquainted with the Moravian Brethren, whose worship life also made a great impression on him. He was active in various revivalist associations, including the Hauptverein für christliche Erbauungsschriften in den preußischen Staaten ('Main Association for Christian Edification Writings in the Prussian States'), founded by Samuel Elsner, and as secretary in the temperance association, led by Friedrich Wilhelm Georg Kranichfeld.

During a trip to Leer in 1835, he met Johann Gerhard Oncken in Hamburg, who had just founded the first German Baptist congregation there. After intensive study of the Baptist understanding of baptism and congregationalism, he invited Oncken to Berlin in 1837 and was baptized by him there on Pentecost Sunday. With some of those also baptized by Oncken, he founded the first Prussian Baptist congregation in Berlin and became its pastor and elder. For this purpose he was ordained in England in 1840. After initial difficulties with the authorities, his congregation was sponsored by King Frederick William IV from 1854 at the instigation of Christian Charles Josias von Bunsen, but was not able to obtain corporate rights until 1879.

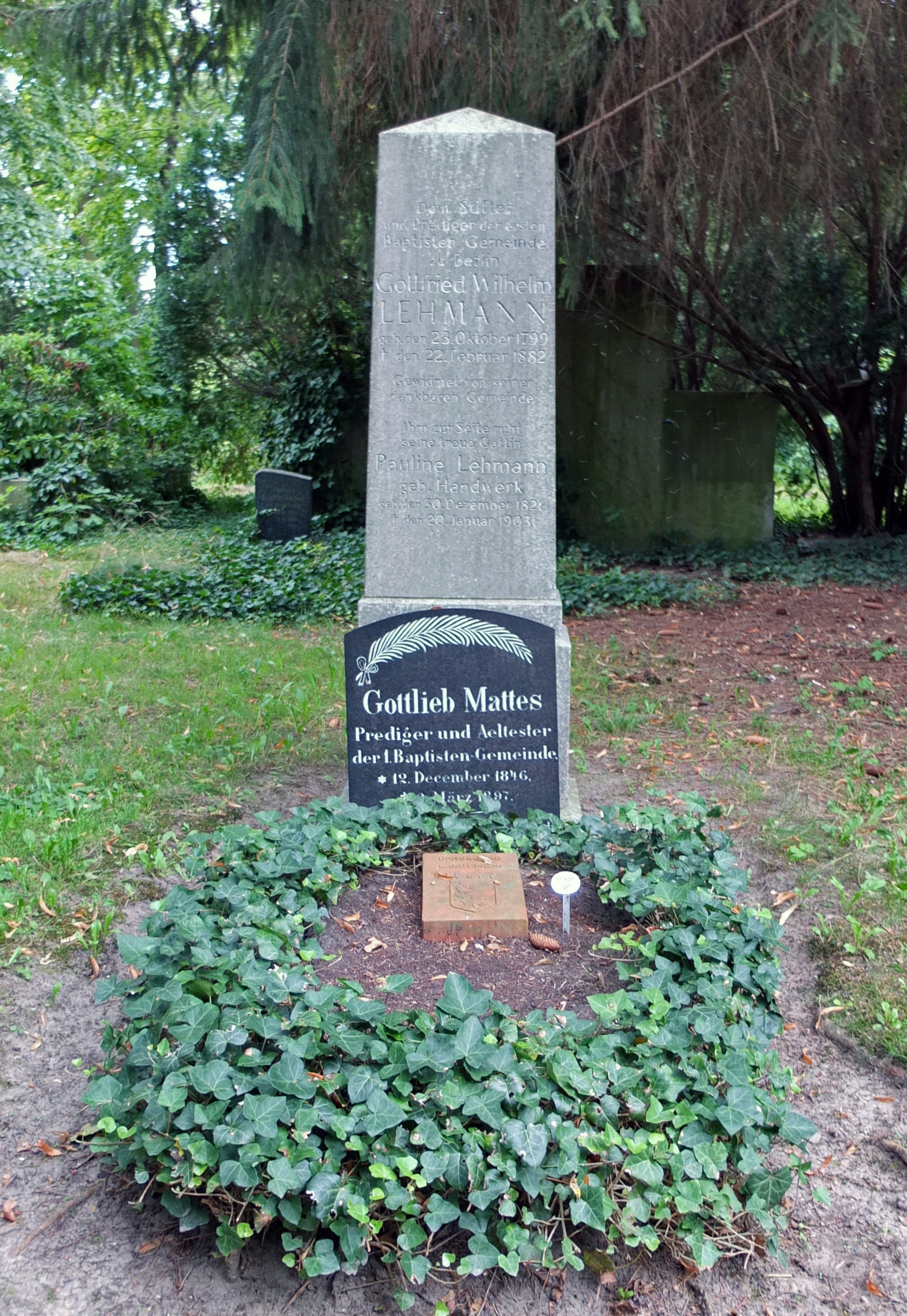
Gravesite at the Luisenstadt Cemetery in Berlin-Kreuzberg

Gottfried Wilhelm Lehmann died in Berlin in 1882 and was given an honorary grave (Ehrengrab) in the Luisenstadt I Evangelical Cemetery in Berlin-Kreuzberg. He had three daughters and four sons, including theologian Joseph Lehmann.

== Significance ==
Lehmann brought Radical Pietistic piety to the still-young German Baptist movement. Lehmann's influence on community life, hymns and the style of piety of the Baptists is still noticeable today. With his Lutheran view of the sacraments, however, Lehmann was not able to assert himself against Oncken, who had a Calvinist influence.

The German Baptists' foreign mission also had its roots in Lehmann. However, Lehmann gained the strongest significance for the young free church by advocating the religious toleration of his church at the highest level. It was not until 1875 that this was enshrined in law in Prussia. The first regional association of German Baptists – the "Prussian Association" – can also be traced back to Lehmann's work. This association, founded in 1848, became the model for the national Baptist Union (today: Union of Evangelical Free Churches) founded in 1849.

Together with pastor Eduard Kuntze, Lehmann led the founding of the German branch of the Evangelical Alliance in 1851.
