= Fredrik Olaus Nilsson =

Swedish Baptist missionary (1809–1881)

Fredrik Olaus (F. O.) Nilsson
- Born: 28 July 1809; Varö, Sweden
- Died: 21 October 1881 (aged 72); Houston, Minnesota, United States
- Burial place: Swede Bottom Cemetery, Houston County, Minnesota
- Occupations: Baptist pastor, missionary
- Spouse: Ulrika Sophia Olsson (m. 1845)

Fredrik Olaus Nilsson (28 July 1809 – 21 or 24 October 1881), also known as F. O. Nilsson, was a pioneer Swedish Baptist pastor and missionary who founded Sweden's first free church, a Baptist congregation. He married Ulrika Sophia Olsson (1812–1903) on 7 June 1845.

== Life ==
=== Early life and influences ===
Nilsson was born to Per Nilsson and Katarina Verdelin on Vendelsö in Värö parish (in what is now Varberg municipality) in northern Halland, Sweden, in 1809. His father was a skipper and his mother died when he was young, leaving behind several children. His father remarried and the family moved to the village of Onsala, in what is now Kungsbacka municipality. The revivalist preaching of Jacob Otto Hoof and Lars Linderot left its mark on the village, although Nilsson himself would come to faith later.

He went to sea at the age of 19. In 1834 he came to faith among Swedish-speaking Methodists in the United States. In 1839 Nilsson returned to Sweden, where the following year he came into contact with Methodist evangelist George Scott. Scott succeeded in getting the American Seamen's Friend Society in New York to employ Nilsson as a seamen's missionary in Gothenburg. Later he also worked as a Bible distributor for the British and Foreign Bible Society.

=== Introduction to Baptist teachings ===
In 1845 Nilsson came into contact with sailor and later sea captain Gustaf Wilhelm Schröder (also known as Gustavus W. or G.W. Schroeder), who was his introduction to Baptist theology. After studying the New Testament regarding baptism, Nilsson travelled to Hamburg in 1847, where he was baptised in the Elbe on 1 August by Baptist pastor Johann Gerhard Oncken. When Nilsson returned to Sweden, he spoke to others about his conversion, which would lead to the formation of the first Baptist congregation in the country.

The following year, on 21 September 1848, Nilsson's wife, his two brothers Sven Kristian and Berndt Niklas, and two men were baptised by Danish Baptist preacher A. P. Førster at Vallersvik in Landa (in the present municipality of Kungsbacka). The same evening, the country's first free church, called Swedish Baptist congregation (Swedish: Sveriges baptistförsamling), was founded in Borekulla cottage in Landa parish. Nilsson wrote the Borekulla Confession, a 3,895-word document mainly regarding his religious views but which also stressed the new congregation's democratic nature, in which men and women held equal voting rights and there would be no hierarchy. In 1849, Nilsson was ordained in Hamburg.

Around this time, Nilsson's Baptist teachings influenced Gustaf Palmquist, who would later become a key figure among the Swedish Baptists – in 1852, Palmquist founded the first Swedish Baptist church in the United States in addition to leading to the creation of the Swedish Baptist General Conference.

=== Exile ===
Because Nilsson's church had been performing baptisms and communion outside of the authority of the Church of Sweden, he was given a warning in 1849 and later summoned to the Göta Court of Appeal in 1850. The same year, he was subject to a brutal beating from a mob. On 4 July 1851, Nilsson left Sweden, having been sentenced to exile for his preaching despite his attempts to appeal to King Oscar I. He travelled first to Copenhagen, then to Hamburg; from there he travelled to the Evangelical Alliance meeting in London, from 20 August to 3 September. The Evangelical Alliance later challenged Nilsson's sentence before the Swedish government. Around this time, Nilsson also preached – unsuccessfully – in Norway. He considered staying there, due to the country's Dissenter Act passed in 1845 – liberal for the time – which allowed a greater degree of religious freedom.

Nilsson was soon appointed pastor of the Baptist congregation in Copenhagen. In this capacity, he baptised Swedish Lutheran priest Anders Wiberg in the Baltic Sea on 23 July 1852. Wiberg would himself become a key figure in the Baptist world, contributing to the movement's growth in the United States, Norway, Sweden, and Finland. In the spring of 1853, Nilsson resigned as pastor in Copenhagen. Prior to that, he visited Sweden and performed the first free church wedding in the country. The police showed up and made him give his word to leave Sweden as soon as possible.

=== Church growth in the United States ===
In 1853 he travelled to the United States with a number of other Swedish Baptists. That year, he visited Rock Island, Illinois, where Palmquist had established a church and the Swedish Baptists were growing in number; several families who travelled with Nilsson joined Palmquist's church. From there he continued to Iowa with the rest of his followers. There, according to author C. Douglas Weaver, "[Nilsson] helped organize the 'Swedish Baptist Church of Village Creek' (now Center Baptist Church), near Lansing, Iowa, the oldest church of Swedish descent in the United States still in existence today." This was the second Swedish Baptist church founded in the country. Nilsson then reached Minnesota, starting churches and preaching in Houston, Wastedo, Chisago Lake, and Scandia, where he founded a church together with Andrew Peterson, an immigrant whose diaries inspired Vilhelm Moberg's series The Emigrants. The church was initially located in Peterson's home. The church building they built soon after was eventually moved to Bethel College and the congregation still exists under the name Oakwood Community Church in Waconia, Minnesota.

Nilsson was supported by the American Baptist Home Mission Society while in the United States.

Together with Baptist pioneers Palmquist and Wiberg, Nilsson contributed to the founding of the Swedish Baptist General Conference, later to become the Baptist General Conference and then Converge. They, and others, first met in September 1858 at the church in Scandia. Being a new and informal movement, the pastors lacked formal theological education and there was some theological dissent at this early stage. Nilsson noted disagreement on the doctrine of the Trinity at the meeting, and the three leaders had views varyingly shaped by Reformed theology.

=== Church growth in Sweden ===
In 1857, the country had 200 church members comprising eight Baptist churches. In 1858, the Conventicle Act, which outlawed religious meetings other than those of the Lutheran Church of Sweden, was overturned. By the following year, the Baptists had grown to a total of 4,311 members in 95 churches.

=== Pardon and return to Sweden ===
Nilsson returned to Sweden in 1860, at which point he was pardoned. This allowed him to continue preaching; however, not in the state church. The same year, the first Dissenter Act was enacted, allowing nonconformists to leave the Church of Sweden. In 1861, Captain Schröder also returned to Sweden and built Gothenburg's first Baptist church at his own expense. Nilsson became its first pastor. After the church's opening, Schröder was fined after the two were summoned by Bishop Gustaf Daniel Björck to appear at the police court. Nilsson remained the church's pastor until 1868, when he returned to the United States.

=== Later life in the United States and beliefs ===
In 1869, the Nilsson family settled in Houston, Minnesota and joined the Swedish Baptist church there. Nilsson served on and off as the church's pastor, although with some tension. He once referred to the congregation as "ignorant and narrow-minded". He remained pastor until 1876, when 13 members left the church in protest of his theological development. His writings, inspired by transcendentalist Theodore Parker, had, among other things, questioned the doctrine of the Trinity. Nilsson would then found the Swedish Free Religious Society.

Nilsson died on 21 or 24 October 1881 in Sheldon, Minnesota. He is buried in Swede Bottom Cemetery in Houston County, Minnesota.

== See also ==
- Baptist Union of Sweden – Former Baptist denomination in Sweden
- Radical Pietism
- Religion in Sweden
