= German Evangelical Alliance =

German Protestant organization

- Founded: 1851
- Founders: Georg Treviranus
- Type: Evangelical organization
- Purpose: Evangelical Christianity
- Location: Germany
- Chairmen: Reinhardt Schink
- Affiliations: World Evangelical Alliance
- Website: www.ead.de

The German Evangelical Alliance (German: Evangelische Allianz Deutschland (EAD), formerly Deutsche Evangelische Allianz) is a national evangelical alliance in Germany.

Legally, the Evangelical Alliance of Germany (EAD) is organized as a registered association based in Bad Blankenburg, Thuringia. The association forms the umbrella organization for a network of approximately 900 local alliances and 370 organizations and ministries affiliated with the Alliance. Main members are the Union of Evangelical Free Churches (Baptist and Brethren Christian denomination), Federation of Free Evangelical Churches and Evangelischer Gnadauer Gemeinschaftsverband. Denominations of the main protestant church in Germany, the Evangelical Church in Germany (EKD) are not member of EAD.

The EAD is part of the network of the European Evangelical Alliance and the World Evangelical Alliance. Its regular publication is the quarterly magazine EINS.

== History ==
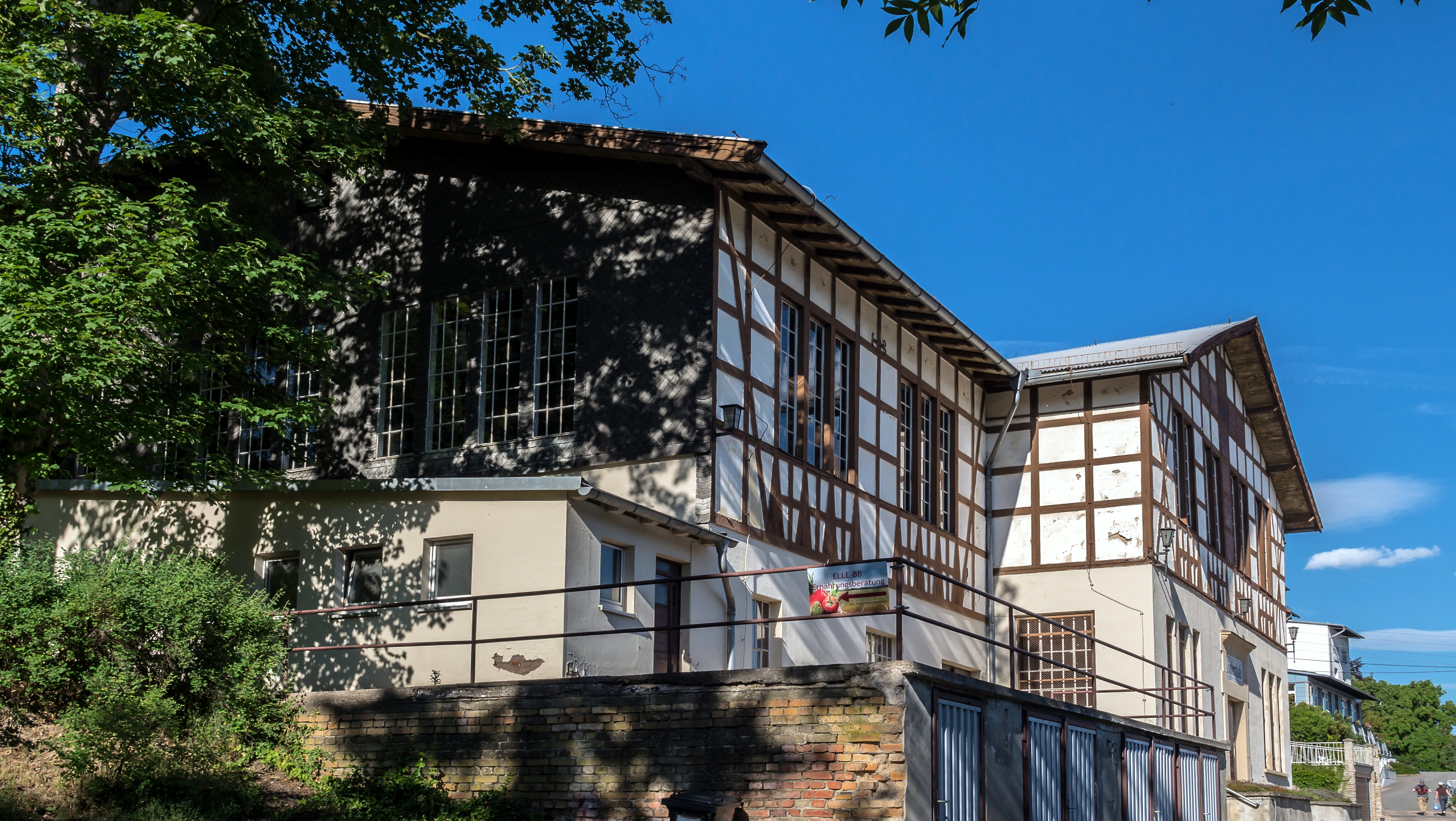
The congress centre in Bad Blankenburg

Following the international world conference in London in 1846 and an expanded group of German participants at the subsequent conference in 1851, representatives from northern Germany decided to found German Evangelical Alliance. Important people were Georg Treviranus in Bremen, Friedrich Wilhelm Krummacher, Gottfried Wilhelm Lehmann and Jakob Theodor Plitt.

Following Adolf Hitler’s seizure of power in 1933, the Evangelical Alliance initially offered no response in its official publication, the Evangelical Alliance Gazette (*Evangelisches Allianzblatt*). A "wait-and-see" attitude prevailed. The leadership of the Alliance deliberately distanced itself from the Confessing Church (Bekennende Kirche). They sought at all costs to avoid being drawn into the "church struggle," so as not to jeopardize their own legal status or the relative freedom they enjoyed for evangelism and the fostering of fellowship.

At the time, large segments of the evangelical, pietistic, and free-church movements, which were organized within the Alliance, shared a traditionally conservative, pro-authority outlook. They were often skeptical of the atheistic labor movement and the democratic Weimar Republic, and they hoped that the new regime would bring about a national and moral renewal.

With the division of Germany after WW2 there were two Alliances: the Evangelische Allianz in der DDR in East-Germany and the Deutsche Evangelische Allianz e. V. in West Germany, based in Stuttgart. In the course of German reunification, both organisations merged. The offices of the Deutschen Evangelische Allianz were in Stuttgart, Baden-Württemberg (HQ of Pietkong Germany) until November 2004. With a tight budget, the organisation moved to Bad Blankenburg, Thuringa.

== Positions ==
=== Claim to Truth ===
Critics outside the network often take issue with the exclusive claim to truth that stems from the evangelical understanding of the Bible (biblical fidelity). There is concern that this theological claim to absolute truth could be carried over into the political sphere.

=== Homosexuality ===
The EAD has traditionally maintained a biblically conservative and restrictive stance on homosexuality. In its core guiding principle (“marriage as a good institution from God”), the EAD maintains that only a lifelong and exclusive marriage between a man and a woman conforms to God’s created order. It rejects “marriage for all” as well as the practice of homosexuality. When the then-chairman, Michael Diener, suggested in 2015 that same-sex partnerships should be viewed with greater nuance from a faith perspective, it triggered a severe internal crisis and extensive theological debates within the alliance. Conservative factions accused the leadership of an unacceptable accommodation to the spirit of the times.

=== Islam ===
Theologically, Islam is classified as incompatible with the core of the Christian faith (salvation through Jesus Christ). The EAD explicitly encourages Christians to proclaim the Gospel to Muslims.

=== Stance on Messianic Jews ===
The EAD consistently advocates for the acceptance of Messianic Jews (Jews who believe in Jesus as the Messiah). Large segments of the Protestant churches of EKD traditionally oppose this, citing concerns related to the Christian-Jewish dialogue and an opposition to the proselytizing of Jews (Judenmission); this frequently leads to tensions.

=== Far-right politics ===
Congregations have adresses the recent far-right movements, like AfD in the historic context in Germany. A key point of contention within EAD is the demarcation from the far right. The EAD leadership strongly warns against "völkisch" (ethno-nationalist) and exclusionary thinking, as well as Christian nationalism. However, since segments of the evangelical grassroots share common ground with right-wing populist positions, for instance, regarding issues like family or migration, this firm stance taken by the organization's leadership frequently leads to tensions within the base.

In its position paper on politics and the Christian faith dated September 29, 2026, the EAD affirms that—regardless of political affiliation—it feels compelled by its Christian faith to oppose antisemitism, racism, and political extremism, and to proactively stand up for human dignity, the protection of life, freedom of religion, and the rule of law.

=== Abortion ===
EAD actively lobbies against the liberalization of abortion (such as the repeal of Section 219a of the German Criminal Code) and strictly opposes assisted dying. Progressive social forces criticize this stance as regressive and incompatible with modern-day self-determination.

== Structure ==
EAD forms the umbrella organization for a network of approximately 900 local alliances and 370 organizations and ministries affiliated with the Alliance. Main members are the Union of Evangelical Free Churches (Baptist and Brethren Christian denomination), Federation of Free Evangelical Churches and Evangelischer Gnadauer Gemeinschaftsverband. Denominations of the main protestant church in Germany, the Evangelical Church in Germany (EKD) are not member of EAD. EAD has affiliated members who are connected to the EAD organisation itself or welfare services which are a part of the EAD.

Reinhardt Schink is president of EAD since 2018. He got re-elected in 2024 for 6 years. Schink holds a PhD in strategic management and spent over two decades (1997–2019) working in corporate roles, including Head of Market Management, for the multinational financial services giant Allianz SE. In 2019, he left corporate life to become the General Secretary (and later Vorstand) of the German Evangelical Alliance.

Johann Matthies serves as the political representative of the Evangelical Alliance in Germany (EAD) to the German Bundestag and the Federal Government.

The EAD is a member of the virtual "Institute for Islamic Studies" (IfI). This is a network of Islamic scholars that operates under the auspices of the Evangelical Alliances in Germany, Austria, and Switzerland, providing information and counsel to churches, congregations, policymakers, and the general public.

Deputies of the Evangelische Allianz meet once a year in Bad Blankenburg for the Alliance Conference (Allianzkonferenz).

=== General meeting and convention ===
The General Meeting is responsible for the work of the EAD under association law and exercises oversight. The General Meeting consists of up to 15 members. Two full-time executive board members carry out the day-to-day work of the EAD. The term of office is 4 years, and re-election is possible. The General Meeting is composed of 10 members appointed by the General Meeting itself through co-option. An additional 5 individuals are appointed by the Convention.

In addition, there is the EAD Convention, which serves as the theological advisory body for the EAD. The Convention consists of up to 70 representatives from member churches and organizations. The term of office is four years, and re-election is possible.

The spokespersons for this Convention are Susanne Thyroff, President of ERF Medien, and Stephanus Schäl, a lecturer in Old Testament studies at a private Bible college in Lemgo.

EAD owns and operates a conference center, a recreation home and hotel in Bad Blankenburg.

== Publications ==
- Magazine EiNS – Gemeinsam Glauben, Miteinander Handeln, published quarterly
- Giveaway to special themes, for example Islam
- Statements on ethic and political questions of principle
- Newsletters

== See also ==
- Evangelical Alliance – British evangelical Christian organisation
