= FPC =

FPC may refer to:

== Government ==
- Federal Power Commission, a regulatory agency of the United States federal government
- Federal prison camp, a type of United States federal prisons
- Financial Policy Committee, of the Bank of England
- Forest Products Commission, an agency of the government of Western Australia

== Political parties ==
- Comorian Popular Front (French: Front Popular Comorien), in Comoros
- Patriotic Front for Change (French: Front Patriotique pour le Changement), in Burkina Faso

== Sport ==
- Colombian Professional Football (Spanish: Fútbol Profesional Colombiano)
- Fred Page Cup, a Canadian hockey competition
- Portuguese Cycling Federation (Portuguese: Federação Portuguesa de Ciclismo)

== Technology ==
- Factory production control
- Fast Patrol Craft
- Flexible printed circuit
- Free Pascal Compiler

== Other uses ==
- Federal Passenger Company, a subsidiary of Russian Railways serving long-distance passenger transportation
- Fermentation-produced chymosin
- Finite population correction
- Firearms Policy Coalition, gun rights supporting organization based in the United States
- First-order predicate calculus
- First Parish in Cambridge, a church in Massachusetts, United States
- Flagler Palm Coast High School, in Florida, United States
- Flexible purpose corporation
- Certified Flight Paramedic, FP-C Flight Paramedic Certification
- Foreign Policy Centre, a British foreign affairs think-tank
- Formosa Plastics Corp, a Taiwanese plastics company
- Free person of color
- Free Presbyterian Church (disambiguation)
- Fresh Pretty Cure!, the sixth installment of the Pretty Cure franchise, released in 2009
- Front Page Challenge, a Canadian television show
