= Julius Köbner =

Danish Baptist preacher (1806–1884)

Julius Johannes Wilhelm Köbner
- Born: Salomon Købner; 11 June 1806; Odense, Denmark
- Died: 2 February 1884 (aged 77); Berlin, Germany
- Occupations: Baptist pastor and church founder
- Spouses: Juliane Johanna Wilhelmina von Schröter (died 1868) Dorothea Stagsted (m. 1875; died 1879)

Julius Johannes Wilhelm Köbner, originally Salomon Købner, (11 June 1806 – 2 February 1884), was one of the founding fathers of Northern European Baptists, along with Johann Gerhard Oncken and Gottfried Wilhelm Lehmann, known as the Baptist "cloverleaf" (Kleeblatt). In addition to his extensive missionary and teaching activities in the young free church, his work as a hymnwriter and author is notable.

== Life ==
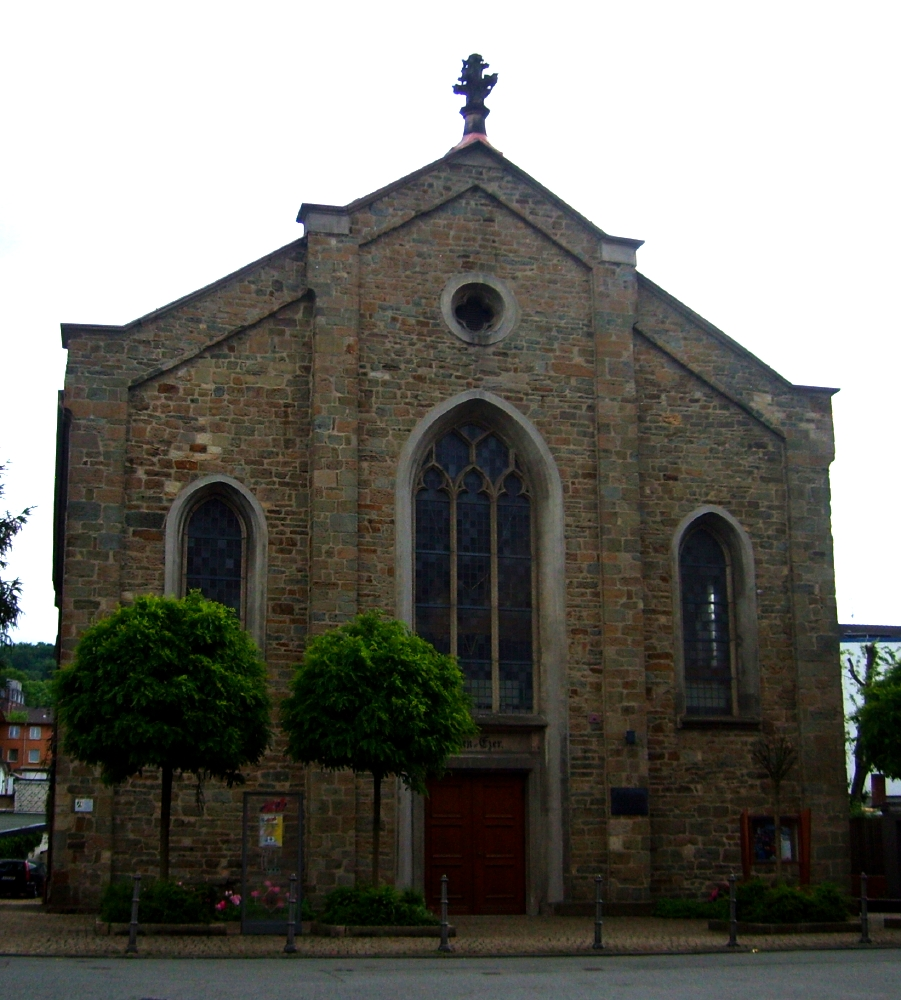
Köbners Kirche, Eben-Ezer Chapel in the Wuppertal district of Barmen

Köbner was born on 11 June 1806 in Odense, Denmark. He was of Jewish descent and the first of nine children of the rabbi and merchant Isaak Aaron and his wife Hanna, née Matthies. Although the family was based in Denmark, their ancestors came from Leszno in Poland. The name Köbner is derived from the name of the Silesian town Köben (Chobienia).

The German language was cultivated in the Köbner family. After attending the gymnasium in Odense, where Köbner received instruction not only in German and Danish, but also in French and English, he learned the trade of copper engraver and also showed great talent in other areas. In 1824 he travelled to Hamburg and Lübeck as a wandering journeyman engraver. In addition to his skilled work, he was an autodidact and studied literature and history. He wrote dramas, poems and essays, some of which were published.

In Hamburg he met his future wife Juliane Johanna Wilhelmina von Schröter, a Lutheran, whom he had met while teaching language. She came from a Mecklenburg family of officers in the service of the Danish Crown. After numerous encounters with the Reformed revivalist preacher Johannes Geibel from Lübeck, Köbner converted to Christianity in 1826 and joined the Evangelical Lutheran Church in connection with his upcoming wedding. With his baptism on 31 July 31 1826 in Hamburg, Köbner changed his first name, calling himself Julius Johannes Wilhelm after his fiancée. He married her shortly after his conversion to Christianity.

In 1835, Köbner became acquainted with the Hamburg Baptist congregation. Under the impression of Johann Gerhard Oncken's preaching, the elder and pastor of the congregation founded only a year earlier, he had a believer's baptism on 26 May 1836, and placed himself at the service of the young movement. Only a few weeks later, his wife Juliane was also baptized in the young Hamburg Baptist congregation. Three of Köbner's siblings also received believer's baptism.

Köbner initially translated Baptist literature from English, edited Oncken's publications and wrote a number of religious writings. In 1837, together with Oncken, he published the first Baptist confession of faith. At the same time, Köbner gained his first experience in the preaching ministry. He also held worship meetings in and around Hamburg and was imprisoned several times in Hamburg for holding unauthorized religious meetings.

Prior to his ordination, Köbner held a significant role in the church in Hamburg, running it when Oncken was away or imprisoned. Köbner was ordained on 6 October 1844. At the same time, he entered the service of the American Baptist Convention as a missionary to German-speaking countries. (Note: American Baptist Convention is the previous name of the American Baptist Churches USA.) Extensive missionary journeys took him through Germany, the Netherlands and Denmark, where he founded a series of Baptist congregations.

Köbner greeted the German revolutions of 1848 with joyful anticipation. That same year he published Manifest des freien Urchristenthums an das deutsche Volk ('Manifesto of Free Primitive Christianity of the German People'). In it, he praises the newly won general religious freedom and portrays the Baptist movement as an emancipatory and grassroots religious movement committed to this civil right. The writing states, among other things: "From the above it will be clear to everyone that we [Baptists] pay homage to the principle of religious freedom. We do not receive this noble freedom only today from the hand of some state authority; for 15 years we have regarded it as our inalienable good, and have enjoyed it continuously, even if at the expense of our earthly possessions and freedom. But we not only claim our religious freedom, but we demand it for every human being who inhabits the soil of the fatherland, we demand it in completely equal measure for all, be they Christians, Jews, Muhamedans or whatever else."

== Importance ==
Köbner shaped the young Baptist movement in many ways – not least through his work as a writer. Christian novels, narratives on church history, and large dramatic poems with a doctrinal character are among his works. In his literary work, he is particularly preoccupied with the history of the Waldensians.

In 1849 Köbner published the first hymnal of the Baptist Alliance, Glaubensstimme der Gemeine des Herrn. (Note: The spelling is Gemeine (without d); see the title of the hymnal in the bibliography and cf. Herrnhuter Brüdergemeine)

59 songs in this hymnal were written by Köbner. He also edited the first hymnbook of the Danish Baptists. While the German Baptists' penultimate hymnal (Note: Gemeindelieder; this hymnal was used in German-speaking Baptist and Free Evangelical congregations from 1978 to 2003.) still contained three songs by Köbner, the present church hymnal Feiern & Loben contains only one of his songs.

== Church planting ==
In 1839, Köbner visited Denmark, later returning with Oncken, where Oncken baptized Peder Christian Mønster and established the first Baptist church in Scandinavia (and first free church), in Copenhagen. In 1845 Köbner organized the first Dutch Baptist congregation, which was to become the starting point of the Baptist movement in the Netherlands. Köbner founded the Barmen Baptist congregation in 1852, thus laying the foundation for the emergence of Baptist congregations in the Prussian province of Rhine. The Danish Baptist movement also owes its emergence to the effectiveness of Köbner. From 1865 to 1879 he was pastor of the Copenhagen Baptist congregation he founded. The Baptist movement in northwest Germany and Berlin also received important influences from Köbner's work.

== Family ==
After the death of his first wife in 1868, Köbner married Dorothea Stagsted from Denmark in 1875. This marriage produced a daughter, Ruth Baresel. His second wife also died in 1879. At the end of his life Köbner took over a preaching position in Berlin, where he spent his remaining years until his death on 2 February 1884.

== Acknowledgement ==
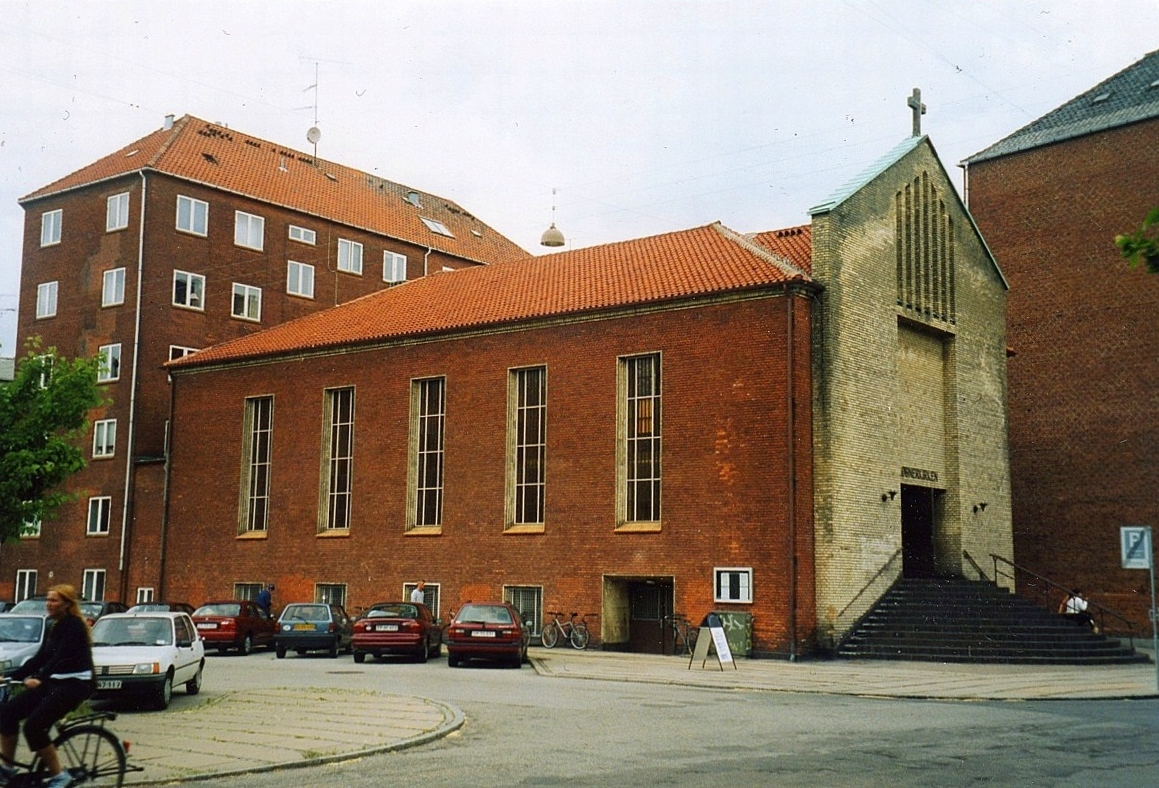
Köbner Church Copenhagen (Denmark)

The Baptist churches in Wuppertal, Copenhagen and the Julius Köbner Chapel of the Evangelical Free Church congregation in Hamburg-Hamm were named after Julius Köbner. There is a Julius Köbner Straße ('Julius Köbner Street') in the Wustermark district of Elstal.

== Works ==
=== Selected writings ===
- Manifest des freien Urchristenthums an das deutsche Volk, Hamburg 1848
- Die Gemeine Christi und die Kirche, Hamburg 1853 (Note: A contemporary (critical) state church review of this writing can be found in M. Goebel: Die Baptisten am Niederrhein, in: Monatsschrift für die evangelische Kirche der Rheinprovinz und Westphalens (ed. by Lic. J. W. Krafft and Lic. M. Goebel), 1854 (January – June), p. 222ff.)
- Eine Widerlegung der von Herrn Archidiaconus Lührs herausgegebenen Schrift »Die Wiedertäufer«, Hamburg (1850), 2nd ed. 1853 (referring to Albert Lührs "Die Wiedertäufer," 1848).
- Warum dürfen keine Apokryphen in der Bibel stehen?, Hamburg 1853.
- Worin besteht die Heiligung des Christen? Beantwortung nach der Heiligen Schrift, Hamburg 1855.
- Leitfaden durch die Bibel für Kinder, Hamburg 1858.
- Das Lied von Gott. Ein didaktisches Gedicht in 8 Theilen. Mit einer Einleitung und begründenden Anmerkungen, Hamburg 1872.
- Ist der Glaube an Wunder noch zeitgemäß? In Übereinstimmung mit ächter Realphilosophie beantwortet, Elberfeld 1878.
- Rationalismus unter den Gläubigen, Elberfeld o. J. (1878)
- Die eigenthümliche Herrlichkeit der neutestamentlichen Gemeinde der alttestamentlichen gegenüber. Nach der heil. Schrift, Elberfeld 1881.
- Die Geigerin. Erzählung, Barmen 1881.
- Die Sünde wider den heiligen Geist, Wiesbaden 1881.
- Reform der Gemeindeversammlungen. Ein Referat, gelesen den 16. August 1882 in der Bundeskonferenz zu Altona, Elberfeld 1882.
- Staat und Kirche, vereinigt oder getrennt, Elberfeld 1882.
- Der Zustand nach dem Tode, Elberfeld 1882.
- Die neue Erde. Eschatologische Studie, Elberfeld 1883.
- Wasser aus dem Heilsbrunnen. Eine Sammlung von Predigten, ed. Hermann Windolf, Berlin 1906.
- Um die Gemeinde. Ausgewählte Schriften, ed. and commentated by Hermann Gieselbusch, Berlin 1927.

=== Songbooks ===
- Glaubensstimme der Gemeine des Herrn. Liedersammlung (first Baptist songbook), Hamburg 1849; 1860
- Troens Stemme. Psalmensammling, Copenhagen 1870.
- Liederstrauß für Christen, Hamburg 1877.

== See also ==
- Baptists in Germany
