= Rome Baptist Church =

- Chiesa Battista di Roma
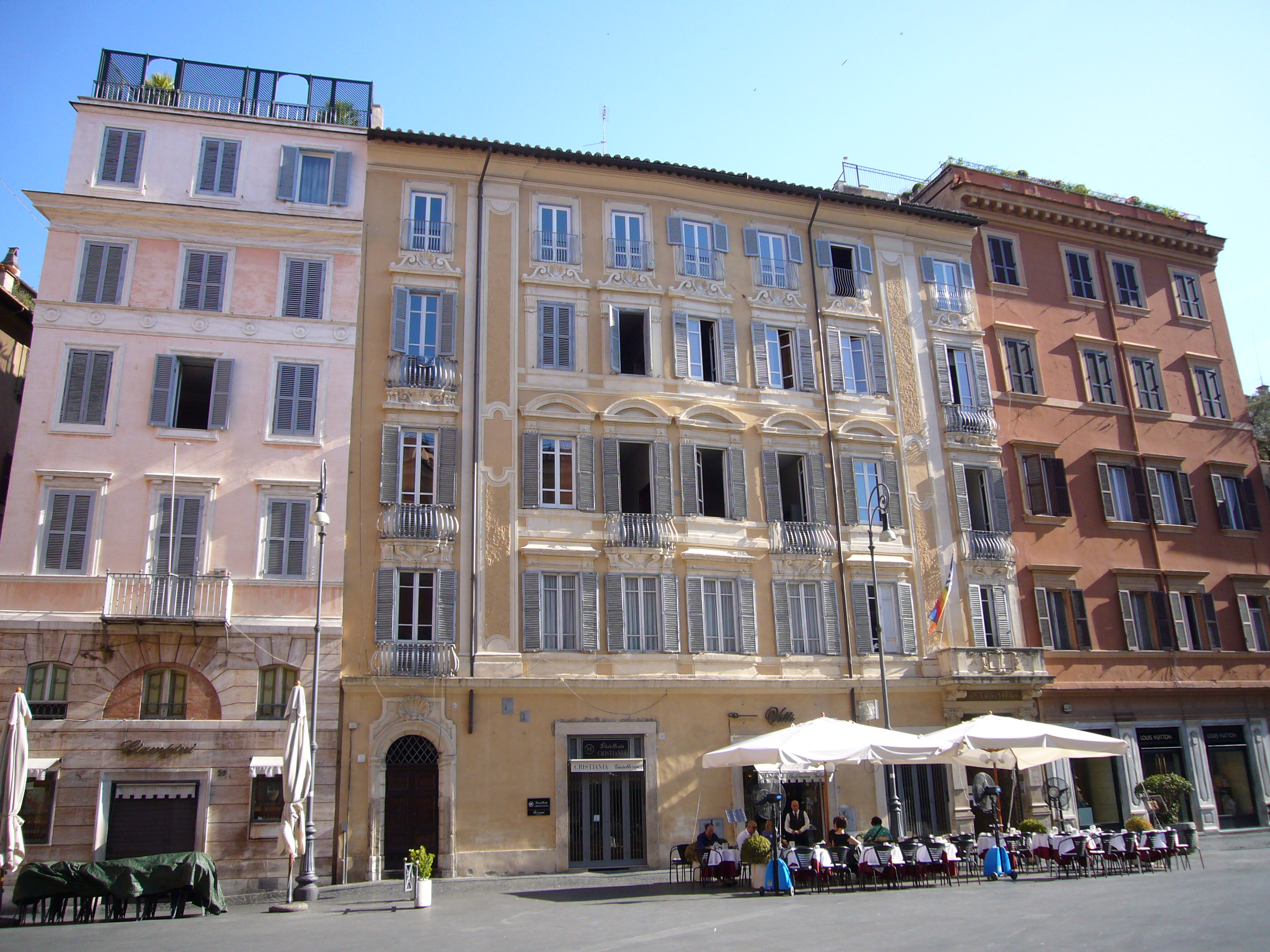
- Rome Baptist Church. Entrance is located on the right side door of the yellow building.
- Rome Baptist Church
- 41.90377°N 12.47819°E
- Location: Piazza San Lorenzo in Lucina, Rome
- Country: Italy
- Denomination: Baptist
- Website: www.romebaptist.org

History
- Founded: 10 March 1963
- Founder: Rev. William C. Ruchti

Architecture
- Style: Renaissance
- Years built: 16th century

Specifications
- Capacity: 200

Clergy
- Pastor: Rev. David Hodgdon

Rome Baptist Church is an English-speaking Baptist church located in Rome, Italy. It is affiliated with the International Baptist Convention.

== History ==
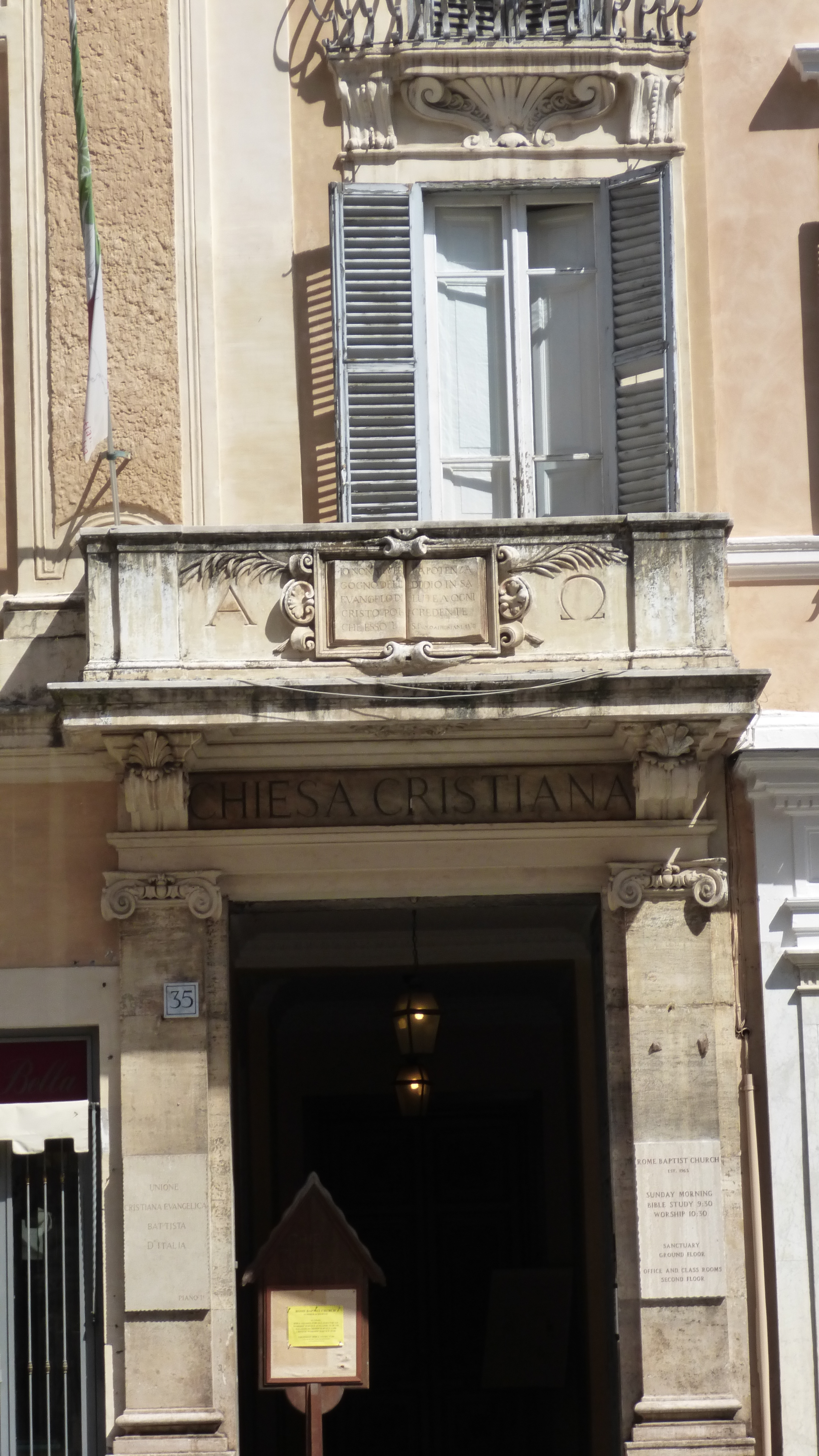
Front entrance to Rome Baptist Church, located in Piazza San Lorenzo.

The Rome Baptist Church building is located in a palazzo in Piazza San Lorenzo in Lucina that was once part of Palazzo Ruspoli, originally built in the 16th century. The location where the church now stands was originally the stable for the Ruspoli family horses. The Foreign Mission Board purchased the building in 1920. The building consists of a first floor sanctuary seating more than 200, classrooms for Sunday school and meeting rooms on the second floor, and a third floor apartment for the pastor.

Twelve people met in the worship room at Piazza San Lorenzo on 12 August 1962, the first meeting of the congregation now known as Rome Baptist Church. The church was officially organized on 10 March 1963 with 15 charter members. Organization efforts were led by Rev. William C. Ruchti, the pastor, and his wife, Helen, missionaries sent to Rome by the Foreign Mission Board.

Ruchti served as church pastor until June 1985 when he was replaced by Rev. Kenneth Lawson, assisted by his wife Irene. Lawson served until May 1998, after which the church relied on volunteer pastors and missionaries for several years. In April 2001 Rev. David Hodgdon and his wife Cathy arrived from Buena Vista, Colorado, to serve as pastor and wife and they remain to this day. In September 2000 the church became independent of the International Mission Board (formerly the Foreign Mission Board) and became a self-supporting church.

== See also ==
- Protestantism in Italy
