= FRC =

FRC may refer to:

== Organizations ==
- Fatah - Revolutionary Council, a defunct terrorist organization
- Federacion de Radioaficionados de Cuba, a Cuban amateur radio organization
- First Responders Children's Foundation, an American non-profit organization; see Disney Princess
- Financial Reporting Council, an independent regulator in the UK and Ireland
- Finnish Red Cross

=== Finance ===
- First Republic Bank, an American bank
- First Round Capital, an American venture capital firm
- First Reserve Corporation, an American private equity firm

=== Education ===
- Feather River College, in California, US
- Fort Richmond Collegiate, a high school in Winnipeg, Manitoba, Canada

=== Government ===
- Family Records Centre, a defunct British genealogical library
- Federal Radio Commission, a defunct regulatory agency of the US federal government
- Federal Republic of China, a proposed federal republic encompassing mainland China, Macau, and Hong Kong
- Federal Record Centers, one of the National Archives facilities

=== Religion ===
- Family Research Council, an American conservative Christian organization
- Family Rosary Crusade, a Roman Catholic prayer movement
  - Family Rosary Crusade (TV program), a Philippine television program
- Fraternitas Rosae Crucis, an American Rosicrucian organization
- Free Reformed Churches (disambiguation)

== Science and technology ==
- Fiber-reinforced composite
- Fiber-reinforced concrete
- Field-reversed configuration, a type of plasma device studied as a means of producing nuclear fusion
- Flame-resistant clothing
- Frame rate control, in displays
- Fibroblastic reticular cells, a type of reticular cell
- Fourier ring correlation, in structural biology
- Functional residual capacity, the volume of air present in the lungs at the end of passive expiration

== Music ==
- "F.R.C." (song), a 1991 single by Australian rock band The Screaming Jets
- Futuristic Retro Champions, a Scottish band

== Transportation ==
- Franca Airport (IATA code), in Brazil
- Fast Response Car, of the Singapore Police Force
- Fast Response Cutter, of the United States Coast Guard
- Functional road class, in road functional classification

== Other uses ==
- FIRST Robotics Competition, an annual international robotics competition for students aged 14-18
- Cajun French (ISO 639-3 language code)
- Fischer Random Chess, a chess variant
- Folk Research Centre, in Saint Lucia
- Frater Rosae Crucis, a title in the Rosicrucian Order
- French Republican calendar
- Fire-Resistant clothing
