= German Baptists =

German Baptists may refer to:

- Baptists in Germany
- Schwarzenau Brethren, commonly called German Baptists, an Anabapist tradition

== See also ==
- North American Baptist Conference, formerly the General Conference of German Baptist Churches in North America
