= Fredrik Nilsson =

Fredrik Nilsson may refer to:

- Fredrik Nilsson (tennis), Swedish tennis player
- Fredrik Nilsson (actor), Swedish actor who appeared in Stockholm Östra
- Fredrik Nilsson, drummer of the Swedish indie rock band The Sounds
- Fredrik Nilsson (football referee), Swedish referee who officiated at the 2011 FIFA U-20 World Cup
- Fredrik Nilsson (ice hockey), Swedish former ice hockey player, see 1991–92 San Jose Sharks season
- Fredrik Olaus Nilsson, Swedish Baptist missionary
