= Baptist Union of Denmark =

National organization of Baptists in Denmark

The Baptist Union of Denmark (Danish: Baptistkirken i Danmark) is a Baptist Christian denomination in Denmark. It is a member of the European Baptist Federation, the Baptist World Alliance, and the World Council of Churches. Headquarters of the Union are maintained in Copenhagen.

== History ==
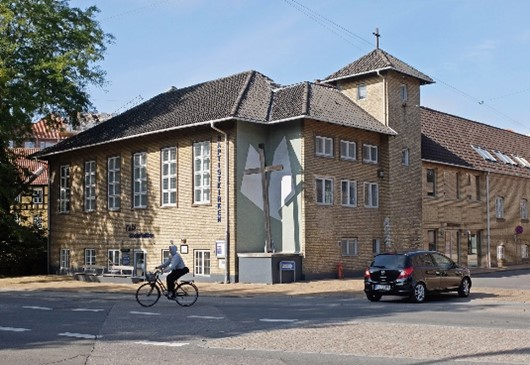
Odense Baptist Church.

The first work in Denmark generally considered Baptist began in 1836 when Julius Köbner, a Danish Jew, visited Hamburg, Germany and met some individuals with Baptist views. Köbner was an associate and co-worker of Johann Gerhard Oncken (1800–1884), often considered the father of European Baptists. Oncken baptized these believers and established a church in Copenhagen in 1839. Until 1849, when religious liberty was granted through the Constitution of 1849, Baptists were fined, imprisoned, and their infants baptized by compulsion. The Baptists were instrumental in the obtaining of religious freedom in Denmark.

The Baptist Union was formed in 1849, and remained a part of the German Baptist Union until 1888. In that year, it was reorganized, influenced by the emigration of Danish Baptists to the United States, and the returning influence of American Baptists on the Danish. The New Hampshire Confession of Faith was adopted in place of the German Confession of 1847. A number of Danish pastors studied at Morgan Park Seminary in Chicago, Illinois. In 1918, they established their own theological seminary.

Doctrinally, the Danish Baptists have evolved from a generally Calvinistic closed Baptist tradition to a more Arminian ecumenical body. Open communion has been practiced since the 1930s.

According to a census published by the association in 2023, it claimed 4,937 members and 54 churches.

The theological seminary is located in Tølløse.
