= Free Church in Hafnarfjörður =

Church in Iceland

Coordinates: 64°04′10″N 21°57′18″W

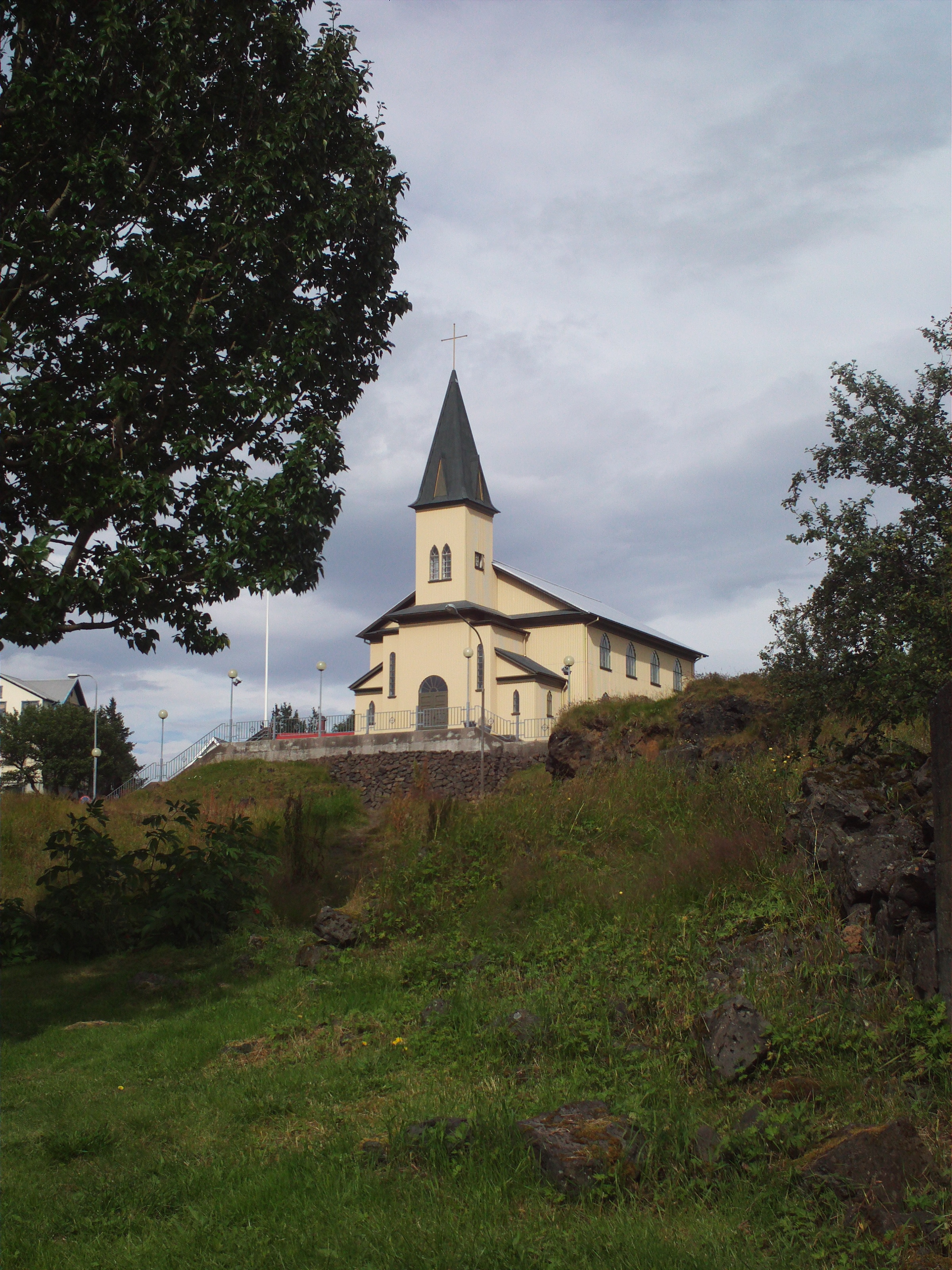

The Free Church in Hafnarfjörður (Icelandic: Fríkirkjan í Hafnarfirði) is a church in the Free Lutheran congregation of Iceland, located in Hafnarfjörður. The church was founded on 22 April 1913. It's Iceland's third largest religious body, after the Reykjavík Free Church and the Church of Iceland.

Sr. Einar Eyjólfsson has been the church priest since 1984, accompanied by another priest, sr. Sigríður Kristín Helgadóttir, since 2000.
