= Free church =

Christian denomination independent of the state

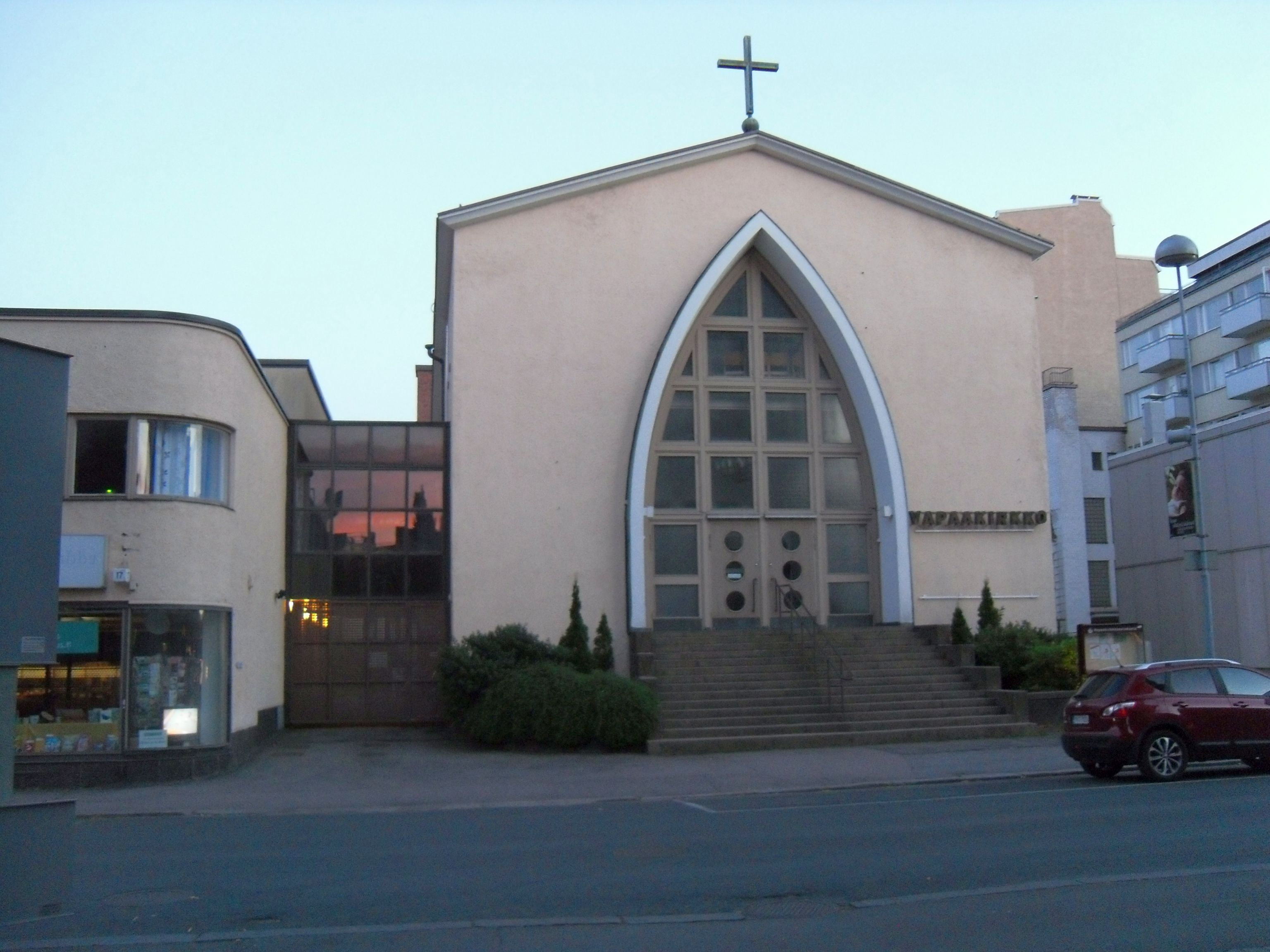
Free Church of Tampere, Finland

A free church is any Christian denomination that is intrinsically separate from government (as opposed to a state church). A free church neither defines government policy, nor accepts church theology or policy definitions from the government. A free church also does not seek or receive government endorsements or funding to carry out its work. The term is only relevant in countries with established state churches. Notwithstanding that, the description "free" has no inherent doctrinal or polity overtones. An individual belonging to a free church is known as a free churchperson or, historically, free churchman. In Scandinavia, free churchpersons would include Protestant Christians who are not communicants of the majority national church, such as the Lutheran Church of Sweden. In England, where the Church of England was the established church, other Protestant denominations such as Presbyterians, Congregationalists, Baptists, the Plymouth Brethren, Methodists and Quakers are, accordingly, free churches. In Scotland it might be used regarding any Protestant denomination, including the Free Church of Scotland, the Free Presbyterian Church of Scotland, the Reformed Presbyterian Church of Scotland etc, in distinction to the established Church of Scotland.

== History ==
In the Middle Ages, groups like the Waldensians were in practice free churches. In 16th century Europe, within the radical movements such as the Anabaptists were free churches with small exceptions like the Münster Rebellion. Mennonites, the Amish, the Quakers and other churches maintain free church polities into the present date both in Europe and in North America. Free churches also evolved in the US supported by the official separation of church and state, while much of Europe maintains some government involvement in religion and churches via taxation to support them and by appointing ministers and bishops etc., although free churches have been founded in Europe outside of the state system.

== By denomination ==
=== Anglicanism ===
One church in England in the Anglican tradition, has used the name 'Free Church', known as the Free Church of England. John Gifford (nonconformist) had founded a free church in Bedford, England in 1650.

=== Presbyterianism ===
Some churches in Scotland and Northern Ireland, mainly of the splinter off Presbyterian tradition, have used the name 'Free Church'. The most important of these to persist at the present time is the Free Church of Scotland. The mainline Church of Scotland is the national church which is Presbyterian and the mother kirk for Presbyterianism all over the world, and is not part of the "Free Church".

=== English dissenters and nonconformists ===
In England and Wales in the late 19th century the new terms "free churchman" and "Free Church" started to replace "dissenter" or Nonconformist.

=== Methodism ===
Among the Methodist Churches, calling a church "free" does not indicate any particular relation to a government. Rather the Free Methodist Church is so called because of three, possibly four, reasons, depending on the source referenced. The word "Free" was suggested and adopted because the new church was to be an anti-slavery church (slavery was an issue in those days), because pews in the churches were to be free to all rather than sold or rented (as was common), and because the new church hoped for the freedom of the Holy Spirit in the services rather than a stifling formality. However, according to World Book Encyclopedia, the third principle was "freedom" from secret and oathbound societies (in particular the Freemasons).

=== Radical Pietism ===
Denominations belonging to the International Federation of Free Evangelical Churches trace their roots to the Radical Pietist movement. Radical Pietists separated from the Lutheran churches, which held the status of state churches in Europe.

== By country ==
=== United States ===
In the United States, because of the First Amendment forbidding the government establishment of religion, all churches are by definition free churches. However, many churches in the United States have requested tax-exempt status under section 501c3 of the Internal Revenue Code. This subjects the churches to certain additional regulations to maintain the tax exemption. Churches that are structured under 501(c)(3) face restrictions in the area of political speech: no substantial part of the church's activities may consist of carrying on propaganda or otherwise attempting to influence legislation. 501(c)(3) organizations are also restricted from participating or intervening in any political campaign for or against any political candidate. However, per a recent IRS filing in the U.S. Federal Court, churches (being religious organizations) are now able to endorse candidates without jeopardizing their tax-exempt status. This follows after the National Religious Broadcasters lawsuit against the IRS alleging that the Johnson Amendment violated their First Amendment rights to freedom of speech and expression of religion.

=== Germany ===
In Germany, Protestant churches outside the Evangelical Church in Germany are put under a common label of, and collectively referred to, as "free churches" (Freikirchen) or "Protestant free churches" (Evangelische Freikirchen). This includes relatively new denominations like Baptists, Methodists, etc., as well as older ones like the Mennonites and Evangelical Lutheran Free Church (Germany).

=== China ===
Pew Research Center estimated in early 2010s that China has 35 million independent Protestants (mainly in house churches) and 3.3 million underground Catholics.

=== Sweden ===
In Sweden, the term free church (Swedish: frikyrka) often means any Christian Protestant denomination that is not part of the Church of Sweden, which was the Swedish state church up to 1 January 2000. This includes Baptists, Pentecostals, Methodists, etc.

== List of denominations bearing the name "Free Church" ==
=== Australia ===
- Free Reformed Churches of Australia

=== Austria ===
- Free Churches in Austria
  - Free Christ Congregation – Pentacostal Congregation in Austria
  - Mennonite Free Church of Austria

=== Canada ===
- Evangelical Free Church of Canada

=== Czechia ===
- Church of the Brethren

=== Denmark ===
- Evangelical Lutheran Free Church of Denmark

=== Europe ===
- Evangelical Lutheran Free Church

=== England ===
- Free Church of England

=== Finland ===
- Evangelical Free Church of Finland
- The Union of Independent Evangelical Lutheran Congregations in Finland

=== Germany ===
- Evangelical Lutheran Free Church (Germany)
- Federation of Evangelical Free Churches
  - Federation of Free Evangelical Churches in Germany
  - Federation of Pentecostal Churches (Germany)
  - Union of Evangelical Free Church Congregations in Germany
- Federation of Evangelical Free Churches (Anabaptist Congregations)
- Independent Evangelical-Lutheran Church
- Mülheim Association of Free Churches and Evangelical Communities
- Altapostolische Kirche (see Old Apostolic Church)

=== Global ===
- International Federation of Free Evangelical Churches

=== Hong Kong / China ===
- Evangelical Free Church of China (based in Hong Kong)

=== Iceland ===
- Reykjavík Free Church
- Hafnarfjordur Free Church

=== Japan ===
- Evangelical Free Church of Japan

=== Malaysia ===
- Evangelical Free Church of Malaysia

=== Netherlands ===
- Reformed Churches in the Netherlands (Liberated)
- Reformed Churches in the Netherlands (Restored)

=== Northern Ireland ===
- Free Presbyterian Church of Ulster

=== Norway ===
- Evangelical Lutheran Free Church of Norway
- Lutheran Free Synod of Norway

=== Scotland ===
- Free Church of Scotland (1843–1900)
- Free Church of Scotland (post-1900)
- Free Presbyterian Church of Scotland (post-1893)
- Free Church of Scotland (Continuing)
- United Free Church of Scotland

=== Singapore ===
- Evangelical Free Church of Singapore

=== South Africa ===
- New Apostolic Church
- Old Apostolic Church
- Free Reformed Churches of South Africa
- Free Evangelical Lutheran Synod in South Africa

=== Sweden ===
- Uniting Church in Sweden
- Swedish Pentecostal Movement
- Evangelical Free Church in Sweden
- Swedish Evangelical Mission

=== Switzerland ===
- Freikirchen.ch
  - Free Charismatic Church Congregations in Switzerland
  - Free Evangelical Church Congregations in Switzerland
  - Federation of Free Mission Congregations
- Free Church Congregations in Switzerland
- Evangelical Free Church of Geneva
- Free Church Uster

=== Ukraine ===
- Baptists in Ukraine
- Evangelical Baptist Union of Ukraine
- Shtundists

=== United States ===
- Lutheran Free Church, 1897 to 1963
- Association of Free Lutheran Congregations, 1962–present
- Evangelical Covenant Church
- Evangelical Free Church of America
- Free Reformed Churches of North America

== See also ==
- Free Presbyterian Church (disambiguation)
- Free Reformed Churches (disambiguation)
- Free Church Federation
- Separation of church and state
- Powers Church, in Steuben County, Indiana, near Angola, also known as Free Church and listed as that on the U.S. National Register of Historic Places (NRHP)
- Evangelical Free Church of America, Southbridge, Massachusetts, NRHP-listed
- First Congregational Free Church, Oriskany Falls, New York, NRHP-listed
- Free Church Parsonage, Rhinecliff, New York, NRHP-listed
- Free Church of the Good Shepherd, Raleigh, North Carolina, NRHP-listed
- Independent Catholicism
- Free Christians (Britain)
- Free Religious Movement
