= Baptists in Germany =

Protestant churches in Germany

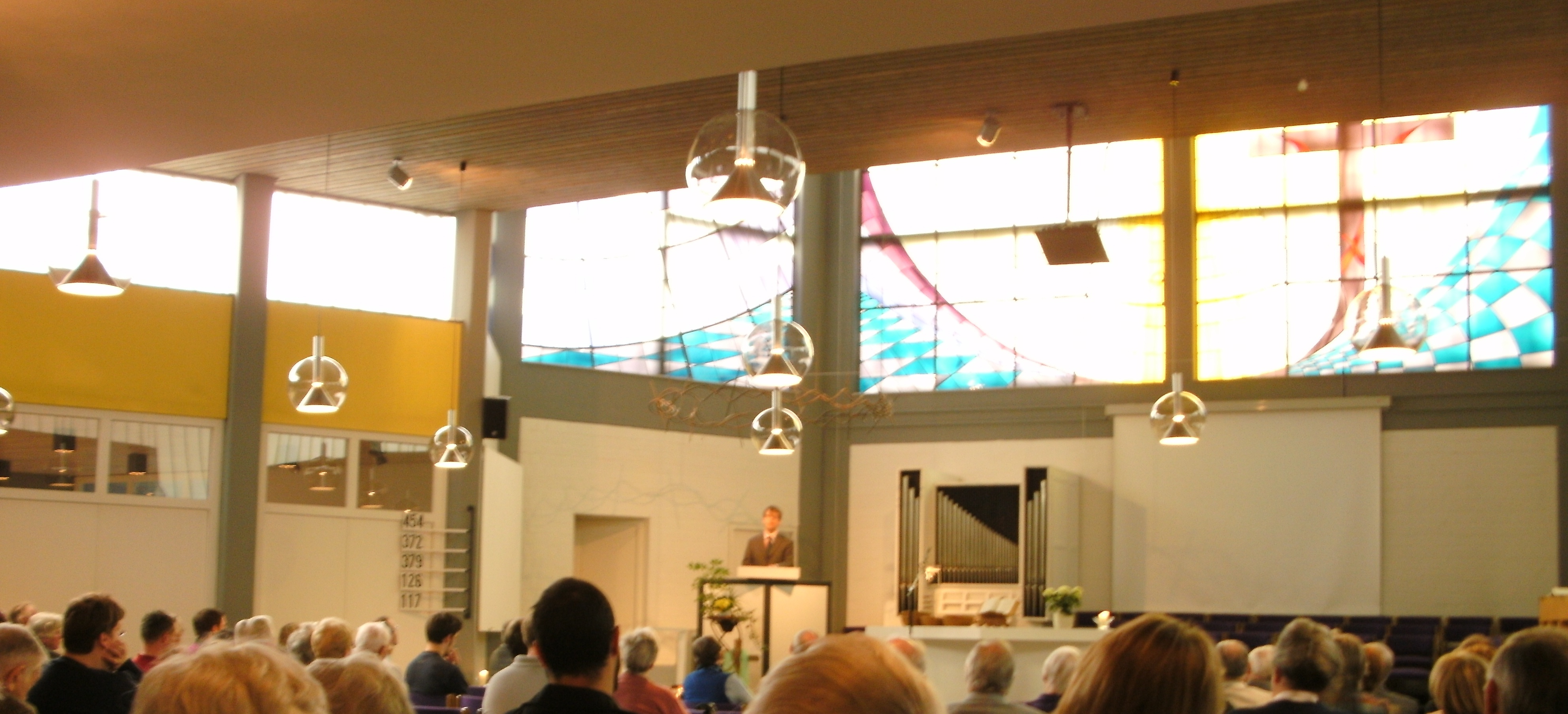
Worship service at Cross Church in Hamburg

Baptists in Germany can be documented as having existed since 1834, the year in which the first congregation was formed by Johann Gerhard Oncken, Barnas Sears and others, in Hamburg that became the nucleus of the Baptist movement in continental Europe. Together with Oncken, Gottfried Wilhelm Lehmann and Julius Köbner formed the "Baptist cloverleaf" of Germany, having a great impact on the movement. Most German Baptists belong to the Union of Evangelical Free Churches, which is part of the Baptist World Alliance through the European Baptist Federation. Other German Baptist congregations, some with Russian-German roots, joined together in new unions beginning in the 1980s. In addition, other smaller congregational networks and a number of so-called free Baptist congregations emerged.

== History ==
Many Baptists are congregationalists, which means that their congregations are highly autonomous. Therefore, regional and supra-regional alliances play only a subordinate role. They do not have a real function in relation to hierarchy, but serve primarily to deal with tasks that a single congregation cannot accomplish. These include, among other things, mission work, diaconia and the theological training of full-time and volunteer staff.

The following is a selection of Baptist unions and movements in Germany.

=== Union of Evangelical Free Churches ===
Logo of the Union of Evangelical Free Churches

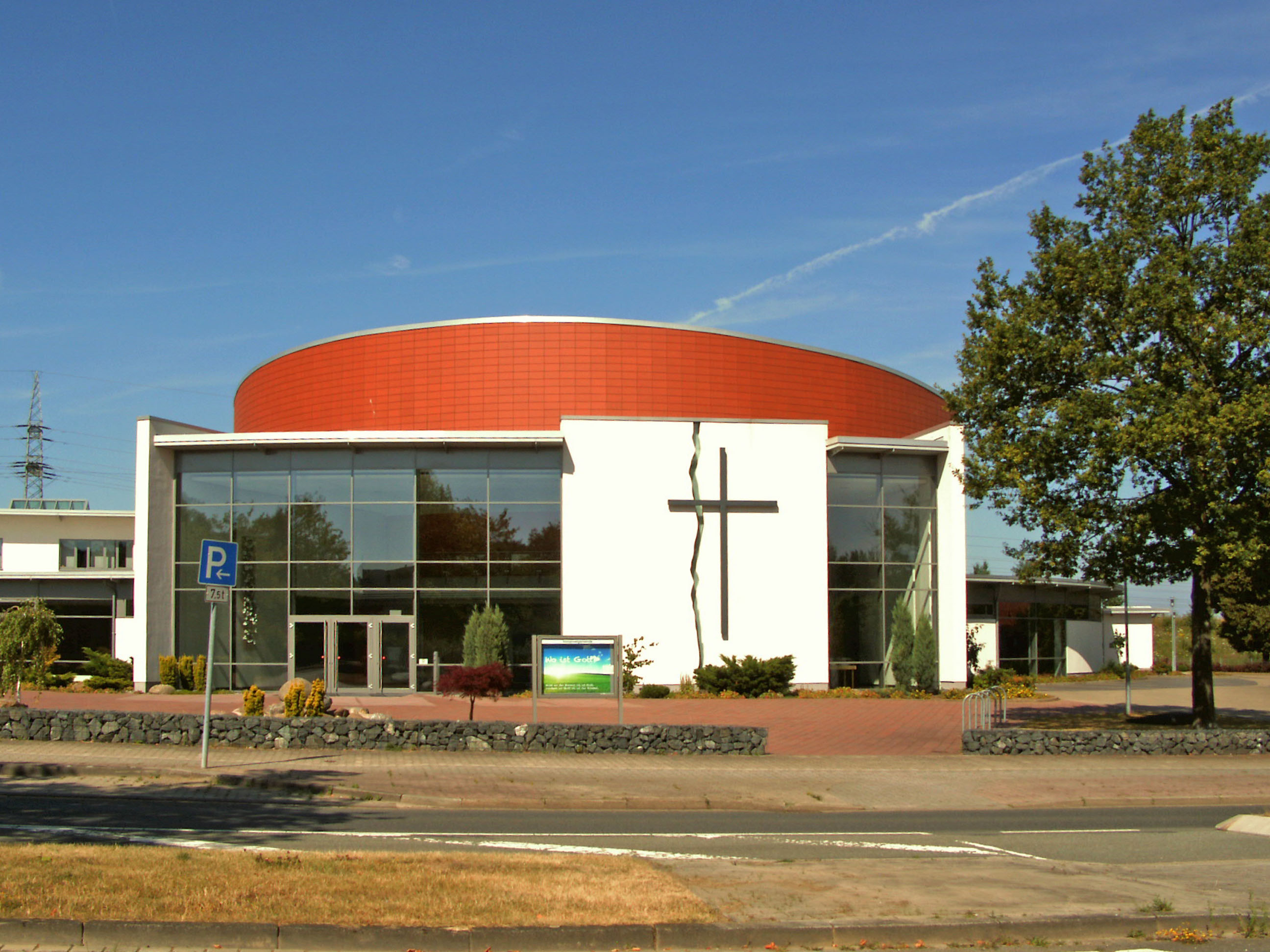
Emmanuel Baptist Church in Wolfsburg, affiliated with the Union

The Union of Evangelical Free Churches in Germany (Bund Evangelisch-Freikirchlicher Gemeinden, BEFG; Baptist and Brethren congregations) has its origins in the first Baptist church in Hamburg founded by the German missionary Johann Gerhard Oncken in 1834. Founded in 1849, the Union of United Congregations of Baptized Christians in Germany and Denmark (Bund der vereinigten Gemeinden getaufter Christen in Deutschland und Dänemark; later: Bund deutscher Baptistengemeinden, Union of German Baptist Congregations) merged in 1942 with the Union of Free Church Christians (Bund freikirchlicher Christen, BfC), which originated in the Brethren movement, and thereby took its present name. According to a census published by the association in 2023, it claimed 786 churches and 75,767 members.

=== Evangeliumschristen-Baptisten ===
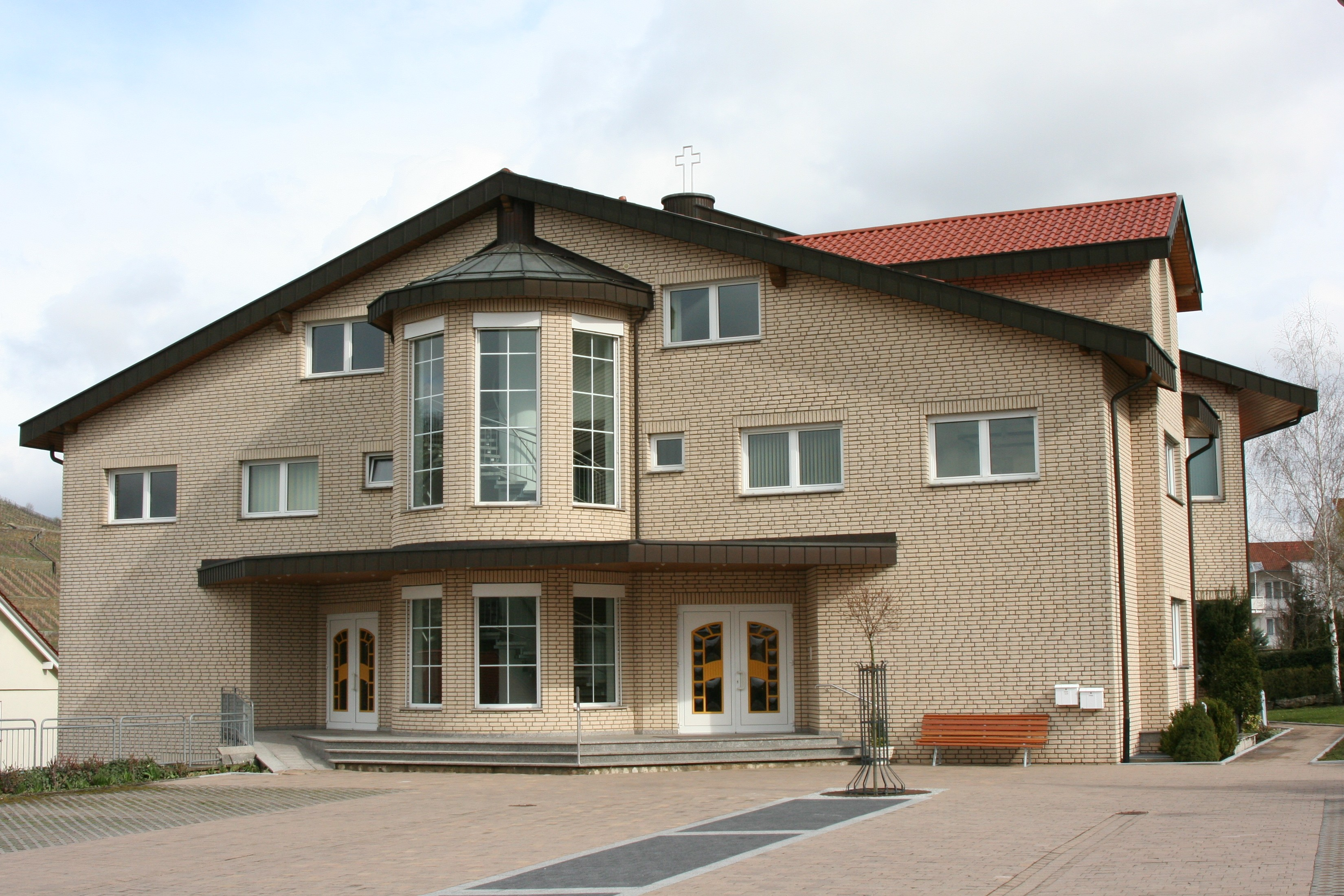
Evangeliumschristen-Baptisten chapel

The Evangeliumschristen-Baptisten ('Evangelical Christians-Baptists') are mostly of Russian-German origin. They were formed in 1944 from the merger of Evangeliums-Christen with the Baptists. Later, other evangelical free churches joined them. In contrast to their Eastern European countries of origin, no unified union of Evangelical Christians-Baptists was founded in Germany. Some of the newly formed congregations have come together in congregational associations such as Bruderschaft der Freien Evangeliums Christen Gemeinden ('the Brotherhood of Free Evangelical Christian Congregations') or the Arbeitsgemeinschaft evangelikaler Gemeinden ('Working Group of Evangelical Congregations'). Another part is connected with German Baptists through the Arbeitsgemeinschaft der Evangeliumschristen-Baptisten in the Union of Evangelical Free Churches or is united with Mennonite Brethren congregations in the Bund Taufgesinnter Gemeinden ('Union of Baptist-Minded Congregations'). In addition, there are also congregations outside of congregational associations.

=== Bund Taufgesinnter Gemeinden ===
The congregations in the Bund Taufgesinnter Gemeinden ('Union of Baptist-Minded Congregations'; BTG) have partly Baptist, partly Mennonite roots. The federation was formed in 1989 from the merger of originally six Baptist-oriented congregations, which were primarily located in the region of Ostwestfalen-Lippe. The BTG has about 6000 members spread over 30 congregations. The Bibelseminar ('Bible seminary'), the theological training center of this association of congregations, is located in Bonn and offers a regular study program as well as a theological correspondence course and a theological evening school.

=== International Baptist Convention ===
The International Baptist Convention goes back to church plantings by American soldiers. In Germany, 25 English-speaking congregations belong to it. From its beginnings in Wiesbaden and Frankfurt, a loose working group was formed in 1958, the Association of Baptists in Continental Europe, which was joined by other congregations and, from 1961, supported by the North American congregational association of the Southern Baptist Convention. In 1964, the Association adopted its current name.

=== Missionsdienst der Freien Baptisten ===
The Missionsdienst der Freien Baptisten ('Free Baptist Mission Service') works together with Baptist Mid-Missions. About ten congregations belong to it. According to their own statements, the Free Baptist congregations are more "theologically conservative" than the Baptists in the Union of Evangelical Free Churches. The main differences are their positions on women's ordination, the charismatic movement and ecumenism, as well as the understanding of the Bible.

=== Baptists connected to KfG ===
The churches of the Missionsdienstes der Freien Baptisten and other free Baptist churches are associated with the Konferenz für Gemeindegründung ('Conference for Church Planting'; KfG). Around 30 congregations are affiliated.

=== Bibel-Baptisten ===
The Bibel-Baptisten ('Bible Baptists') include about 50 churches.

=== Reformed Baptists ===
The Reformed Baptists, who are strongly influenced by Calvinism, include about ten congregations in Germany.

== Total statistics ==
The Religionswissenschaftlicher Medien- und Informationsdienst or REMID ('German Religious Studies Media and Information Service') gives a total membership for "Free Baptist and Mennonite congregations" of about 290,000 in "550 free congregations" in 2012. According to this, most members come from the area of the former Soviet Union. Apart from the fact that these are explicitly not only Baptists, this figure, with the exception of the Union of Evangelical Free Churches, likely also includes some if not all of the above-mentioned groupings.

== See also ==
- Protestantism in Germany
- Religion in Germany
