= International Baptist Convention =

Association of English-speaking Baptist churches in Africa, Europe and the Middle East

- Classification: Evangelical Christianity
- Theology: Baptist
- Associations: Baptist World Alliance
- Region: 26 countries
- Headquarters: Frankfurt, Germany
- Origin: 1959
- Congregations: 63
- Members: 5,429
- Official website: ibc-churches.org

The International Baptist Convention is an international Baptist Christian denomination affiliated with the Baptist World Alliance. The headquarters is in Frankfurt.

== History ==
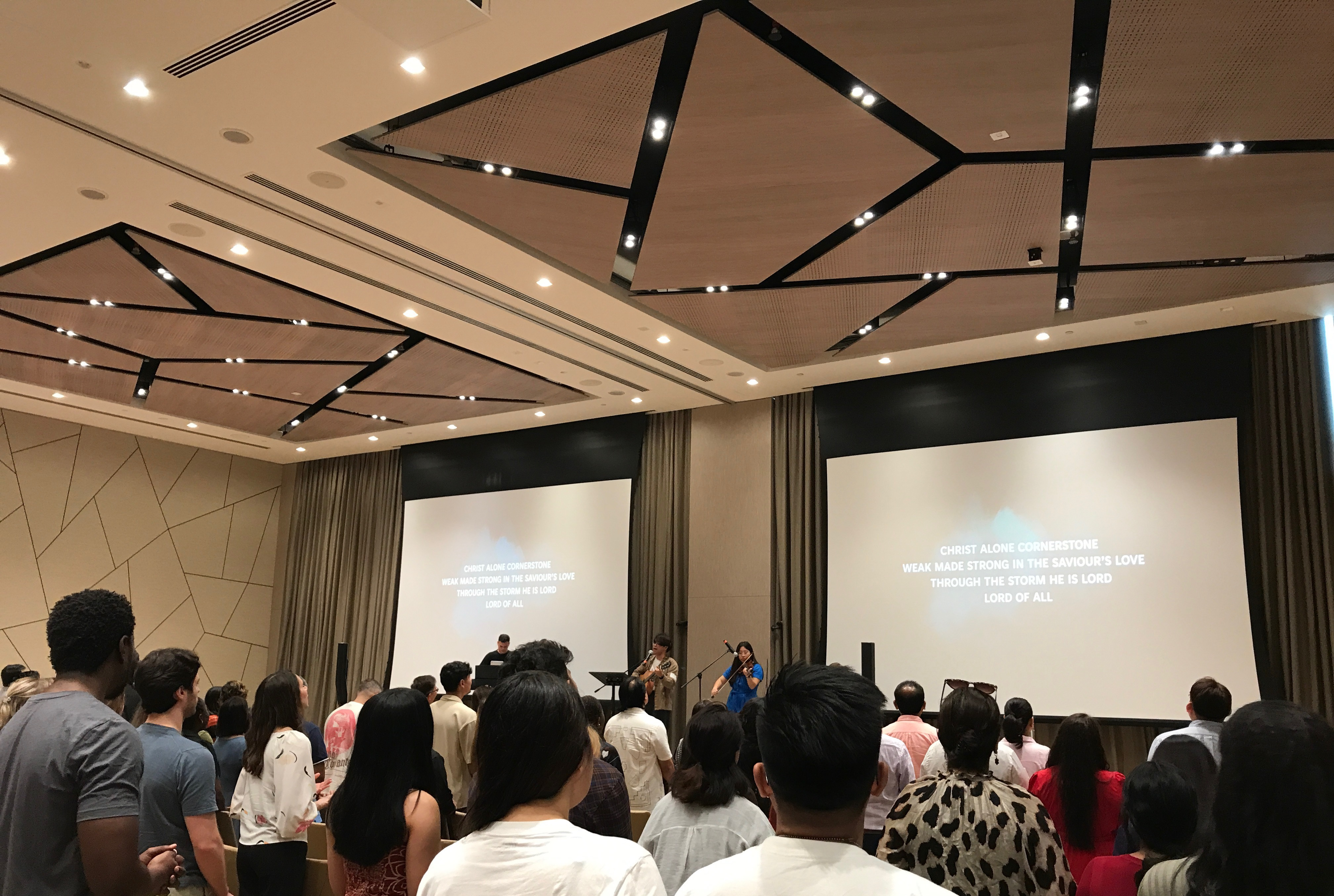
Worship service at Emirates Baptist Church International in Dubai.

The International Baptist Convention has its roots in the Association of Baptists in Continental Europe founded in 1959 by Immanuel Baptist Church in Wiesbaden and Bethel International Baptist Church in Frankfurt, Germany. Beginning in 1961, the International Mission Board sent a missionary couple to work with these churches. Some churches of the British Isles joined the ABCE in 1964, and the name was changed to the European Baptist Convention (EBC). The aim was to provide services in English for foreigners in Europe. In 2003, the name was changed to International Baptist Convention after the body expanded outside Europe. According to a census published by the association in 2025, it claimed 5,429 members and 63 churches, in 26 countries.

== Beliefs ==
The convention has a Baptist confession of faith. It is a member of the Baptist World Alliance.

== See also ==
- Baptists in Germany
- Born again
- Baptist beliefs
- Believers' Church

== Sources ==
- International Baptist Convention Constitution
- International Baptist Convention Operations Manual
