= Free Church Parsonage =

- U.S. National Register of Historic Places
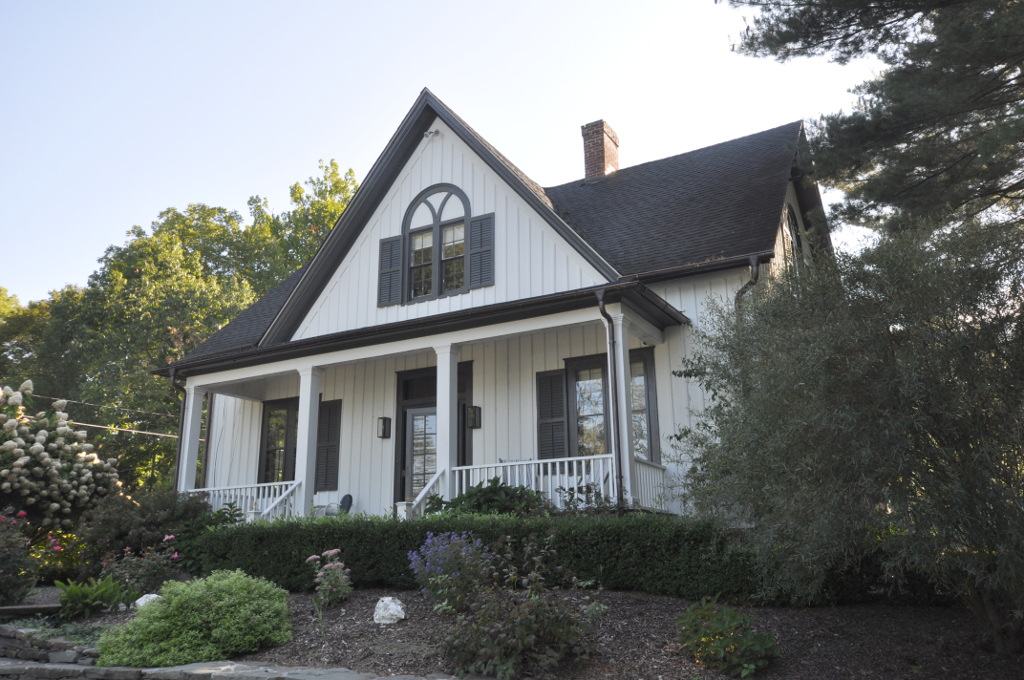

- Location within New York Location within the United States
- Location: Jct. of William and Grinnell Sts., Rhinecliff, New York
- Coordinates: 41°55′3″N 73°57′9″W
- Area: less than one acre
- Built: 1869
- Architectural style: Picturesque Gothic Revival
- MPS: Rhinebeck Town MRA
- NRHP reference No.: 87001090
- Added to NRHP: July 9, 1987

Free Church Parsonage is a historic church parsonage at the junction of William and Grinnell Streets in Rhinecliff, Dutchess County, New York. It was built about 1869 and is a 1 1/2-story, frame cottage with board-and-batten siding in the Gothic Revival style. It has a medium pitched gable roof and has a 1-story hip-roofed verandah. Also on the property is a contributing stone wall.

It was added to the National Register of Historic Places in 1987.
