= Gustaf Daniel Björck =

Bishop of Gothenburg (1806–1888)

The Right Reverend Gustaf Daniel Björck MPhil DTheol
- Bishop of Gothenburg
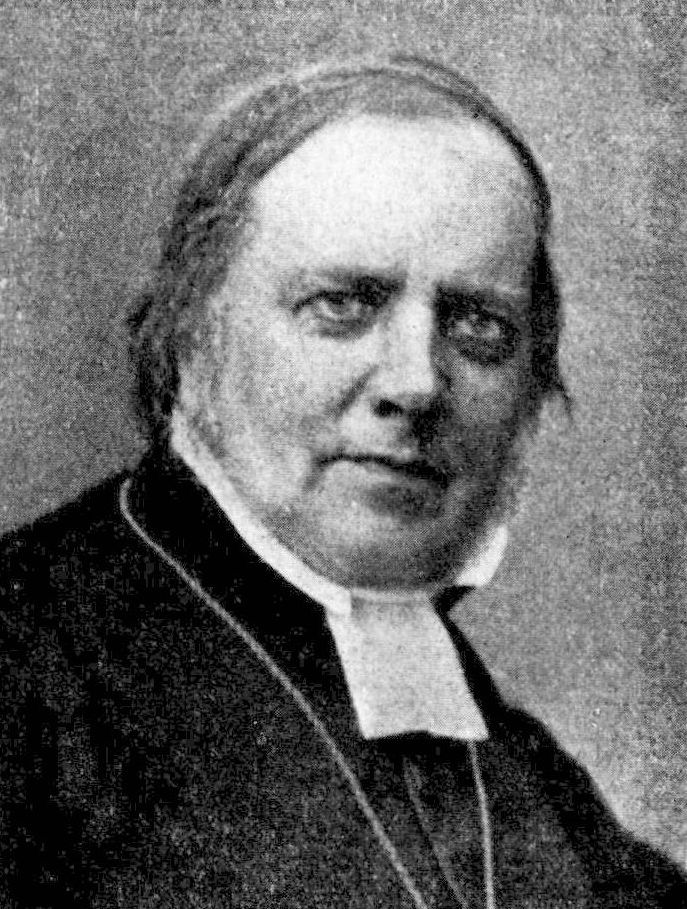
- Contemporary photograph from Svenskt biografiskt lexikon by unknown artist.
- Church: Church of Sweden
- Diocese: Diocese of Gothenburg
- In office: 1856–1888
- Predecessor: Anders Bruhn
- Successor: Edvard Herman Rodhe

Personal details
- Born: Gustaf Daniel Björck; 30 May 1806 German Christinae Parish, Västergötland, Sweden
- Died: 3 January 1888 (aged 81) Gothenburg Cathedral Parish, Västergötland, Sweden
- Buried: Old Örgryte Cemetery
- Spouse: Sofia Elisabet Pripp (m. 1832)
- Children: 6

Gustaf Daniel Björck (30 May 1806 – 3 January 1888) was a Swedish clergyman and a member of the Björck family. He served as bishop of Gothenburg between 1856 and 1888, and he was a member of the Upper House of the Riksdag for Gothenburg and Bohus County in 1867.

== Biography ==
He was born on 30 May 1806 in Gothenburg to Professor Elias Daniel Björck and Elisabet Ulrika Santesson, sister of Berndt Harder Santesson. After graduating from Gothenburg High School (present-day Hvitfeldtska Gymnasiet), he entered Uppsala University on 4 October 1822 and received a Master of Philosophy degree on 23 February 1833. He married Sofia Elisabet Pripp, daughter of Peter Jacob Pripp and Maria Margareta Svensson, on 10 April 1832. They had six children, named Ida, Elise, Ernst, Ludvig, Carl and Amalia.

Early in 1832, he taught at the Gothenburg School of Lore (Göteborgs lärdomsskola) and, after his ordination in 1834, served as curate of Gothenburg Cathedral. He was appointed vicar of Uddevalla in 1842, succeeding Magnus Ullman. Due to his faltering health, he pursued less exhausting occupations. He obtained the curacy in pastoral theology at Uppsala University and later, in 1853, assumed the office. In 1856, he was appointed bishop of Gothenburg and vicar of Tölö. He participated frequently in the Riksdag of the Estates, until its dissolvement, advocating change in representation. Within his diocese, he contributed to the enforcement of Schartauanism.

In addition to his work as a university lector, he published monthly issues of Pastoral-Tidning between 1854 and 1856 in Uppsala. He was also the editor of Bibliskt-Lutherskt Veckoblad in 1861 and received a Doctor of Theology degree the year prior. He died on 3 January 1888 and is buried in the Old Örgryte Cemetery (Örgryte gamla kyrkogård), Gothenburg.
