= Union of Evangelical Free Churches in Germany =

Fellowship of congregations in Germany

- Classification: Evangelical Christianity
- Theology: Baptist, Plymouth Brethren
- Associations: Baptist World Alliance
- Headquarters: Wustermark, Germany
- Origin: 1849
- Congregations: 786
- Members: 75,767
- Missionary organization: EBM International
- Aid organization: German Baptist Aid
- Seminaries: Elstal Theological College
- Official website: baptisten.de

The Union of Evangelical Free Churches in Germany (German: Bund Evangelisch-Freikirchlicher Gemeinden in Deutschland) is a Baptist and Brethren Christian denomination in Germany. It is affiliated with the Baptist World Alliance. The headquarters is in Wustermark.

== History ==
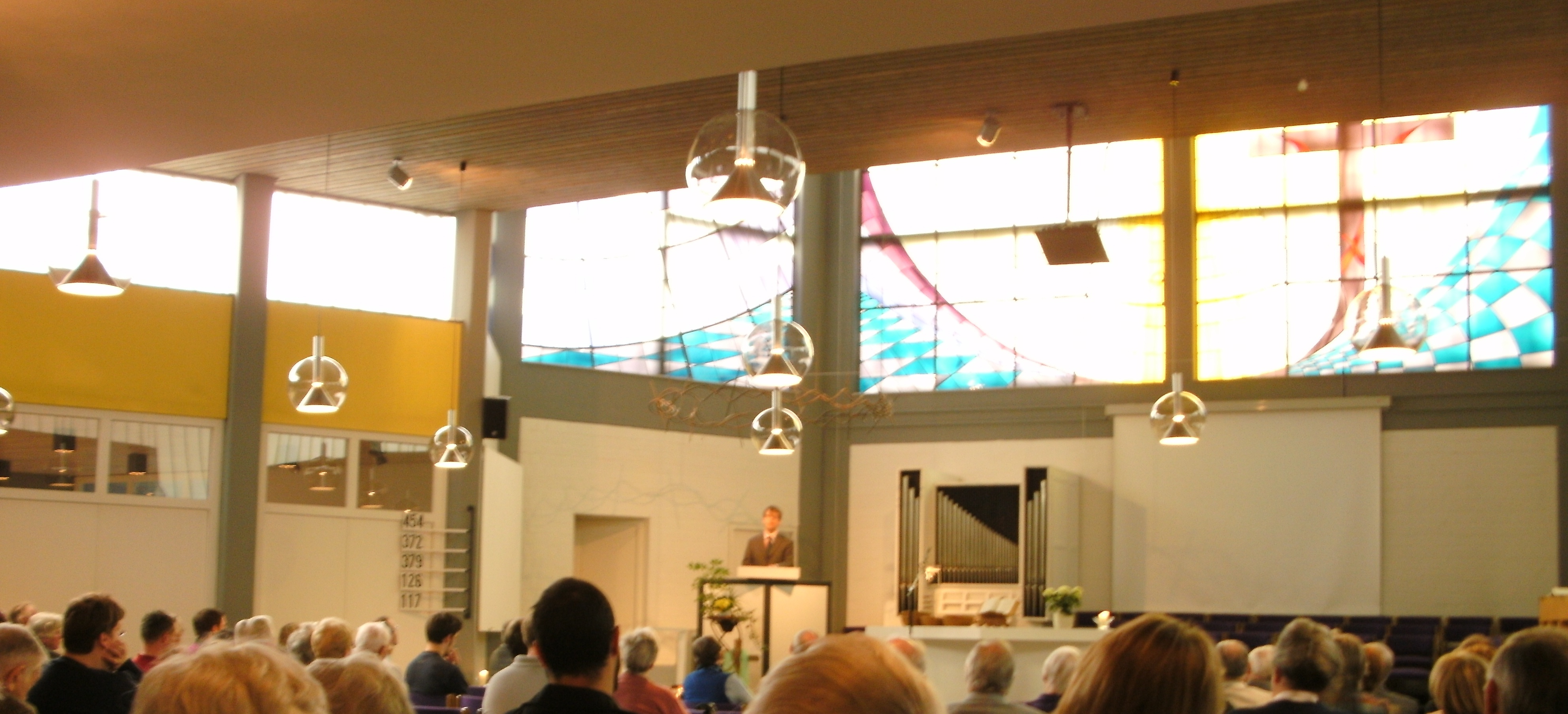
Worship service at Cross Church in Hamburg.

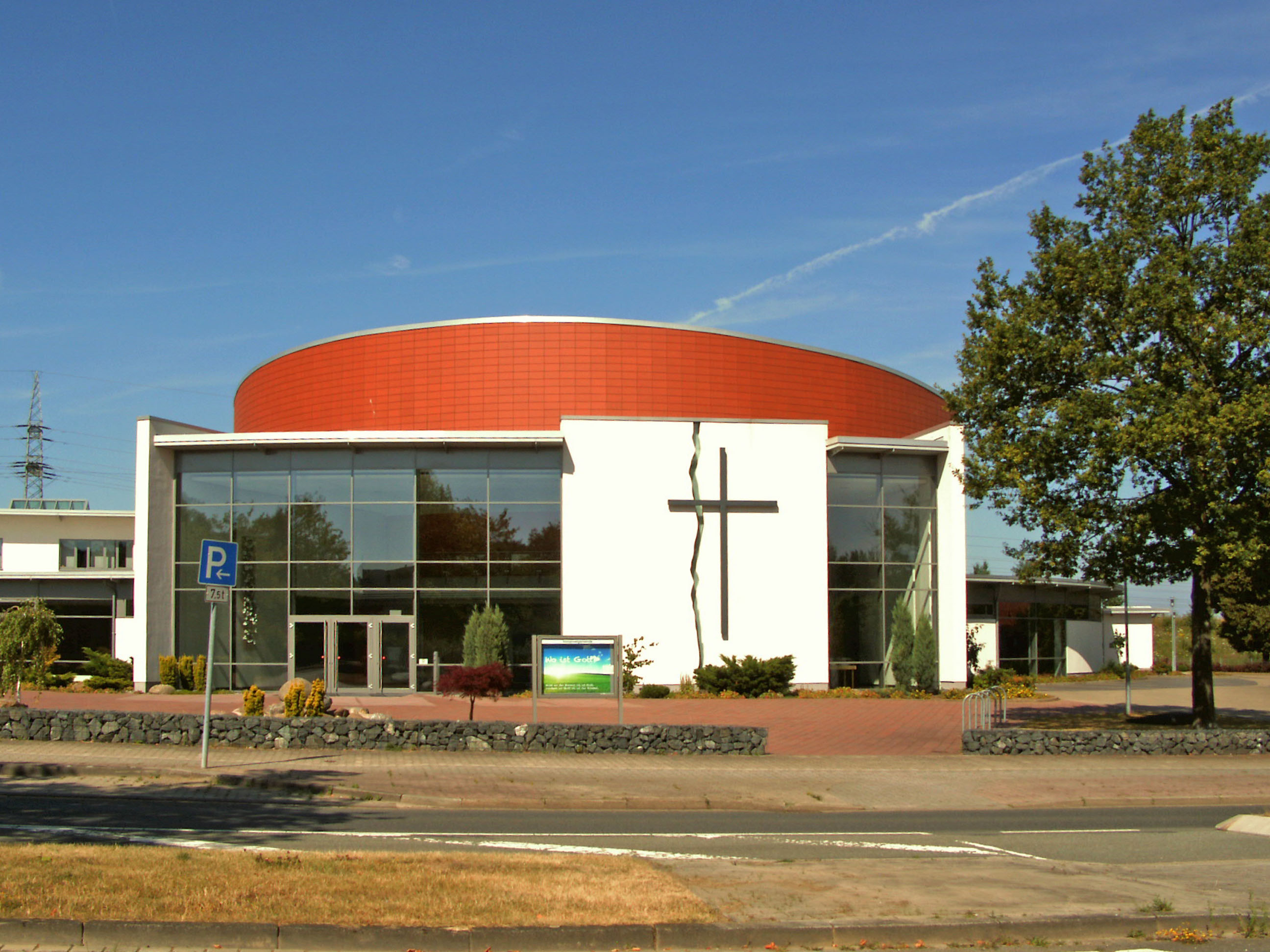
Emmanuel Baptist Church in Wolfsburg, affiliated with the Union.

The Union of Evangelical Free Churches in Germany has its origins in the first Baptist church in Hamburg founded by the German missionary Johann Gerhard Oncken in 1834. It is officially founded in 1849 as Federation of Christian communities baptized in Germany and Denmark. In 1941, the Union of Free Christians merged with the Federation to form the Union of Evangelical Free Churches in Germany. In 1992, the ordination of women pastors was authorized in the Convention. According to a census published by the association in 2023, it claimed 786 churches and 75,767 members.

== Schools ==
It has 1 affiliated theological institute, the Elstal Theological College in Wustermark founded in 1880.

== Missionary organization ==
The Convention has a missionary organization, EBM International.

== Humanitarian organization ==
It has a humanitarian organization, German Baptist Aid.

== See also ==
- Baptists in Germany
