= Federation of Free Evangelical Churches in Germany =

Church system in Germany

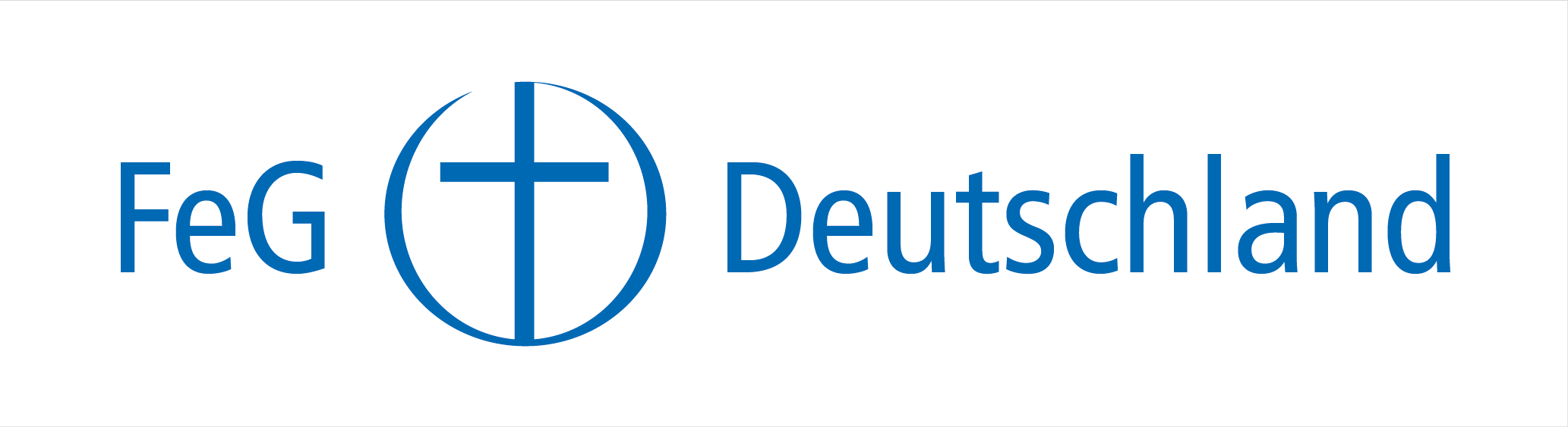
- Classification: Evangelical Christianity
- Associations: International Federation of Free Evangelical Churches
- Headquarters: Witten, Germany
- Origin: 1874
- Congregations: 500
- Members: 40,000
- Official website: feg.de

The Federation of Free Evangelical Churches in Germany (German: Bund Freier Evangelische Gemeinde or 'Bund-FeG') is an Evangelical Christian denomination, with about 500 free evangelical churches (German: Gemeinde) operating in Germany and over 40,000 members.

It is part of the International Federation of Free Evangelical Churches, with headquarters in Witten, Germany.

== History ==
The idea of a free and independent evangelical church in German-speaking sections of Europe originated with Hermann Heinrich Grafe (1818–1869).

After finishing his studies to be a businessman, he became a Christian believer in 1834. Graf attended churches where German Pietism was taught, (a religious movement in Germany emphasizing serious holy living, both in and out of church).

In 1841, while on business trips in France, Grafe met theologian and pastor Adolphe Monod and attended his church in Lyon. Here, Grafe experienced a church that was free from government influence as well as evangelical in its doctrine and practice, (similar to the system in Switzerland at the time). There, Grafe experienced the 'free and liberating Grace of God'. Monod and Grafe adopted the philosophy of "Unity in essentials, freedom in inessentials, and love in everything." This motto was mentioned in the first Evangelical Alliance that took place in London in 1846.

By 1842, Grafe returned to Prussian Rhineland and settled in Wuppertal to start a silk-trading company. Wuppertal was a heavily industrialized city at that time and had an advanced textile industry. He attended a Reformed (Calvinist) church but later felt disappointed with its practices, especially with the church's teachings about communion for both believers and non-believers, and its compulsory church-taxes. He tried to explain his views and his personal experiences with the French free-church system to his Reformed leaders, but to no avail. Even the famous German Social Revolutions of 1848-1849 made no significant changes in the churches.

Finally, Grafe and a small following of like-minded friends left the Reformed Church and started the first evangelical free church in Germany on November 22, 1854, in Elberfeld, a town near Wuppertal. Grafe remained an active elder in this church until his death in 1869. He worked towards a universal alliance of free churches in Germany.

After the Unification of Germany in 1871, it was possible to form a Federation of Free Evangelical Congregations in 1874, with 22 congregations of related denominations retaining their autonomy.

Further development of the Alliance of Free Evangelical Churches was strongly influenced by preacher and publisher Friedrich Fries (1856–1926), who developed an independent Christian publishing house (Bundes-Verlag) in 1887.

After the Second World War, the Bund-FeG founded a bible seminary and pastoral college in Ewersbach.

In 1950 the first FeG church was formed in East Germany.

The Bund FeG is not free of controversy. For example, in 2010 the Federation decided by majority vote to allow local congregations to decide whether to appoint and employ women as pastors. The opposing minority criticized the fact that the Bible had given men ultimate responsibility for leadership and teaching.

== Theology ==
Key characteristics of free evangelical churches are the following:

- Salvation through faith alone in Christ (sola fide)
- Adult believers' baptism (but a blessing for infants)
- Symbolic Communion for believers only
- Autonomy of local churches
- Emphasis on Scripture in faith and daily living
- Separation of church and state
- Priesthood of all believers

== Organization ==
The Free Evangelical congregations finance themselves through donations. The individual congregations are theologically independent and not bound by directives, but maintain a theological consensus. The Federation of Free Evangelical Churches in Germany is divided into several regions and districts in Germany. The federation main office is headquartered in Witten. Its business is managed by its nine-member executive board, which also performs representative duties. The president (German:Präses) is at the head of the executive board.
