= Free Reformed Churches =

Free Reformed Churches may refer to the following churches associated with the Reformed Churches in the Netherlands (Liberated):

- Free Reformed Churches of Australia
- Free Reformed Churches of South Africa

It may also refer to the unrelated

- Free Reformed Churches of North America
- Free Reformed Church of Germany (episcopal)
- Free Reformed Church of Poland (progressive Calvinism)
