= Free Presbyterian Church =

Free Presbyterian Church may refer to:

- Free Presbyterian Church (Australia)
- Free Presbyterian Church of Victoria, formerly Free Presbyterian Church of Australia Felix
- Presbyterian Church of Eastern Australia or the Free Presbyterian Church
- Free Presbyterian Church of Scotland, formed in 1893
- Free Presbyterian Church of Ulster, founded in 1951
- Free Presbyterian Church of North America, became self-sufficient in 2005
