= Johann Gerhard Oncken =

German Baptist preacher (1800–1884)

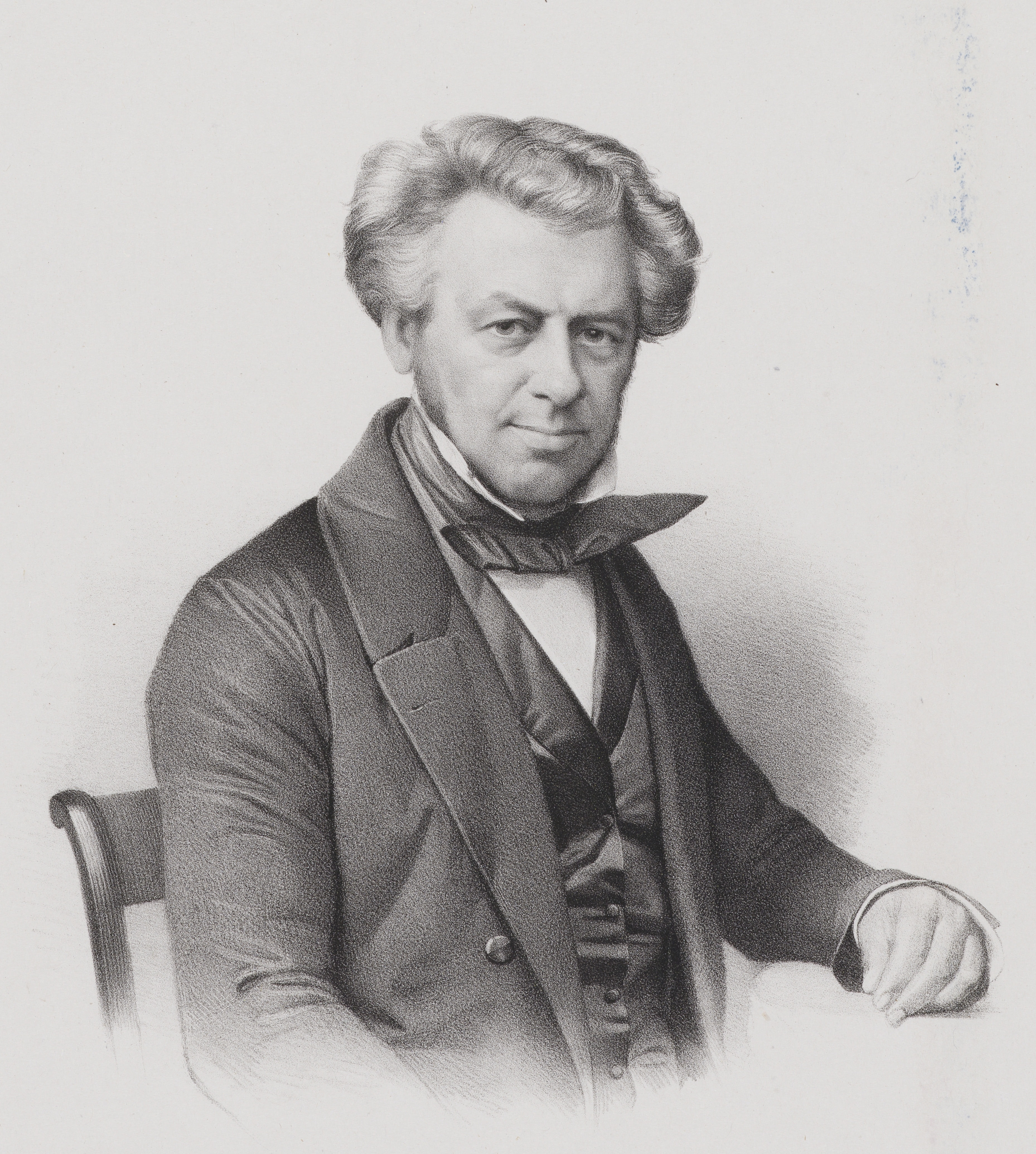

Personal life
- Born: 26 January 1800 Varel, Duchy of Oldenburg
- Died: 2 January 1884 (aged 83) Zürich, Switzerland
- Resting place: Ohlsdorf Cemetery, Hamburg
- Spouse: Sarah Mann (m. 1828; died 1845) Ann Dodgshun (m. 1848; died 1873) Jane Clark (m. 1874)
- Children: 7
- Known for: Pioneering the Baptist movement in Germany and continental Europe
- Relatives: Arthur Oncken Lovejoy (grandson)

Religious life
- Religion: Christianity
- Denomination: Baptist

Johann Gerhard Oncken (26 January 1800 – 2 January 1884) was a pioneer German Baptist preacher, variously referred to as the "Father of Continental Baptists", the "Father of German Baptists" and the "Apostle of European Baptists". Oncken, Gottfried Wilhelm Lehmann (1799–1882), and Julius Köbner (1806–1884) were known as the Baptist cloverleaf (Kleeblatt). J. G. Oncken helped direct and guide the growth of Baptists throughout Germany and across much of Europe for half a century.

Oncken's theology can be described as conservative, Calvinistic, and evangelistic. He favored ministerial education, but not at the expense of spiritual preparation. He held spiritual gifts as a priority over academic preparation. His zealous methods of preaching and evangelism laid the foundation and set the example for many years to come. His work continues to leave a mark on the Baptists of Germany and Europe.

== Early life ==
Johann Gerhard Oncken was born in Varel, a town in the Duchy of Oldenburg. His father was exiled for political reasons, his mother died, and his grandmother raised him. As a child, Oncken was baptized a Lutheran, and confirmed in 1814.

About that time, Oncken was apprenticed to a Scottish merchant. Oncken moved to Scotland and worked in the merchant's business, later working as a tutor in Leith (now part of Edinburgh) and subsequently moving to London.

In Scotland Oncken first attended the Kirk (Church of Scotland), whilst also reading the writings of Anglican James Hervey. When he moved to London he attended worship in an Independent church (Congregationalist). He was converted at Great Queen Street Methodist Chapel in London in 1820.

By 1823 Oncken had returned to Germany as an agent of the British Continental society for the Diffusion of Religious Knowledge over the Continent of Europe. At the time, he was a member of the English Reformed Church under the care of T. W. Matthews. The first Sunday School in Germany was formed in 1825, through the work of Oncken and a Reverend Rautenberg. In 1828, Oncken received an appointment from the Edinburgh Bible Society. He spent over half a century distributing tracts and Bibles, and in 1879 he estimated he had given out over two million Bibles.

== Family ==
Oncken married Sarah Mann of London on 19 May 1828. He and Sarah had seven children. She died in 1845, leaving five surviving children. In 1847, Oncken married a widow from Yorkshire named Ann Dogshun. Both Oncken's children and the Hamburg congregation fully accepted her. Ann died in 1873. She and Oncken had no children. In 1875, Oncken married Jane Clark. Jane was a member of Spurgeon's Tabernacle in London.

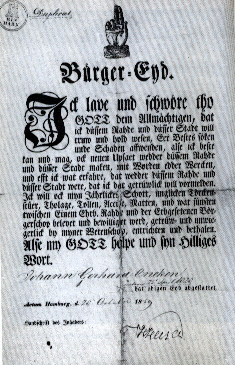

== Adoption of Baptist views ==
Though Oncken lived in Scotland and was converted in London, there is no existing evidence of any contact with the English Baptists. The evangelical Christianity of Scotland was influenced by the Haldane brothers, and it is known that at least later Oncken made contact with them. Oncken apparently arrived at a Baptist position on believer's baptism (and baptism by immersion) by degrees through personal Bible study. By 1829, though still a member of a church that taught infant baptism, he appears to have decided against it, for in that year he refused to present his child for the ceremony. He discussed the baptism issue with T. W. Matthews (his pastor), C. F. Lange (one of his first converts) and others. Matthews became convinced that he should be baptized by immersion, resigned from his church and traveled to England to be baptized. In 1829, Oncken corresponded with James Haldane of Scotland. Haldane recommended that Oncken baptize himself, as John Smyth had done. Oncken thought this was without Biblical authority, and said of Haldane's advice, "Even great men are able to err." Oncken also corresponded with Joseph Ivimey. Ivimey invited him to come to London and receive believer's baptism.

Oncken had also told his story to Calvin Tubbs, a sea captain. Tubbs told Oncken's story to the (American Baptist) Triennial Convention. In 1833, Barnas Sears, a professor at Hamilton College, visited Germany for studies. Having heard the story, he made it a point to find and speak to Oncken. By 1834, Oncken had made a final decision. Sears traveled from Halle, where he was studying, to Hamburg, and baptized Oncken, his wife and five others in the Elbe on 22 April. The baptism was performed at night. The next day, Sears founded the first Baptist church in Hamburg. The church quickly grew to 68 members by 1836, but after that year persecution temporarily halted its growth. Though the Baptists initially engaged in performing baptisms at night, in 1837 Oncken began to baptize openly. That year, he baptized fellow German Baptist pioneer Gottfried Wilhelm Lehmann on Pentecost Sunday. German authorities shared the traditional Christian opposition to rebaptism; they also felt that people being dipped in the river was an offence to public morals. The civil authorities gave them peace for a while after the Hamburg fire of 1842, due to the help the Baptists gave to the people of the city.

In 1848, Oncken was involved in founding Das Missionblatt, the first Baptist paper published regularly in Europe. In 1849, he began to hold organized classes with his students, and in 1880 a four-year seminary was established in Hamburg. He was also influential in the German Baptist confession of faith issued in 1847, and the organization of the Union of Baptist Congregations in 1849.

Oncken also played a role in the conversion of Anders Wiberg, a key figure in the early Swedish Baptist movement, who came to agree with Baptist teachings regarding baptism after a visit with him.

== Relations with Mennonites ==
While in Hamburg, Oncken became acquainted with Jacob Gysbert van der Smissen, a Mennonite deacon. Oncken visited Mennonite churches in Poland in 1833, preaching in the area for about six weeks. Under the encouragement of Abraham Unger, Oncken visited the Mennonite Brethren Church in the Chortitza colony in 1869, assisting in the ordinations of Abraham Unger as elder, Aaron Lepp as minister, and Benjamin Nickel and Cornelius Unger as deacons. After he left, Oncken continued to correspond with the group. A problem arose between Oncken and the Mennonite Brethren when the church banned tobacco use and excommunicated several members who used it. Oncken used tobacco and did not agree with the church action in this case.

== Last years ==
By 1878, Oncken was growing physically weaker daily. In physical weakness and suffering, he drew comfort from knowing "that Christ, having loved him, loved him to the end." He resigned as agent for the various tract and Bible societies that he was serving, but continued to pastor. The Scottish Bible Society gave him a pension. Late in 1879, Oncken suffered a stroke. His physical condition compelled him to retire in 1881. He moved to Zürich where he died peacefully on 2 January 1884. He told his family that his name "was inscribed in Heaven's roll, and that his hope was sure." His body was taken to Hamburg for interment. Köbner preached the funeral sermon from Psalm 73:24, "Thou shalt guide me with Thy counsel, and afterwards receive me to glory." Oncken was then buried in the Reformed Church Cemetery in Hamburg. Two verses of Scripture were placed on his grave: "One Lord, one faith, one baptism" (Ephesians 4:5), and "And they continued steadfastly in the apostles' doctrine and fellowship, and in breaking of bread and in prayers" (Acts 2:42).

== Legacy ==
Oncken was truly an international man—converted in England, baptized by an American in Germany, he traveled across the European continent to preach the gospel and give out Bibles. He conducted "preaching tours" in the Balkans, France, Hungary, Prussia, Russia, and Switzerland, as well as visiting Britain and the United States. He was born a Lutheran, was converted at a Methodist meeting, adopted Baptist views and possessed a relationship with the Mennonites. During his ministry as a Baptist preacher, Oncken constituted over 280 Baptist churches and 1222 preaching stations. He founded over 170 churches in Scandinavia and the Slavic states. He also formed 771 Sunday Schools in Germany. His ministry even extended indirectly to places such as Australia. Several of the German Baptist settlers in Australia, influenced by Oncken and following in his footsteps, were active in sharing the Gospel with their fellow countrymen, thereby establishing the Baptist work among German immigrants. One such German Baptist minister in Australia was Hermann Windolf who in his memoirs records coming to Australia in 1878 but before doing so called on Oncken at his home in Hamburg.

== See also ==
- German Australian
- German settlement in Australia
