= Slavic Native Faith =

New religious movement based on pre-Christian Slavic beliefs

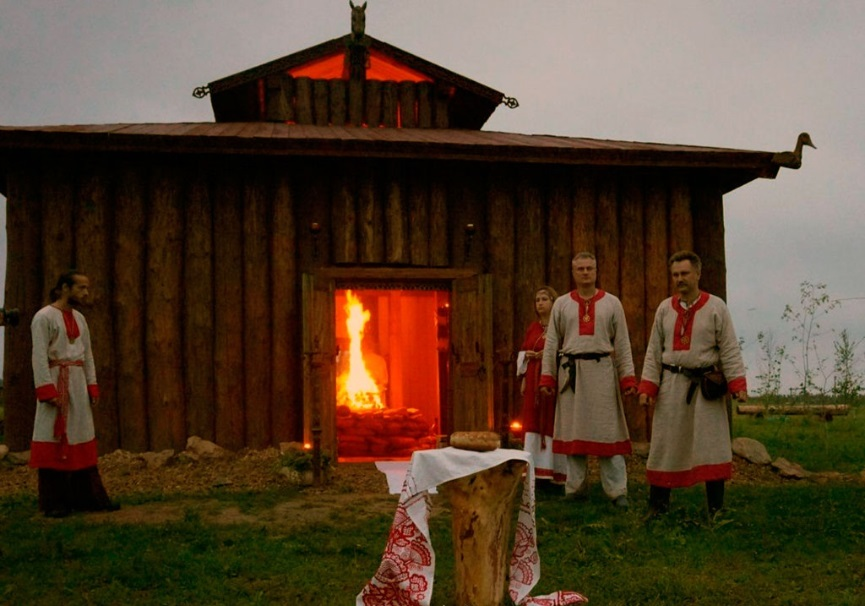
- A ceremony in the temple of the Fire of Svarozhich of the Union of Slavic Communities, Kaluga Oblast

Total population
- 775,000

Founder
- Zorian Dołęga-Chodakowski; Władysław Kołodziej; Jan Stachniuk; Volodymyr Shaian others

Regions with significant populations
- Russia: 757,000 (2012)
- Poland: 7,000–10,000
- Ukraine: 5,000–10,000

Religions
- Ethnic religion

Languages
- Slavic

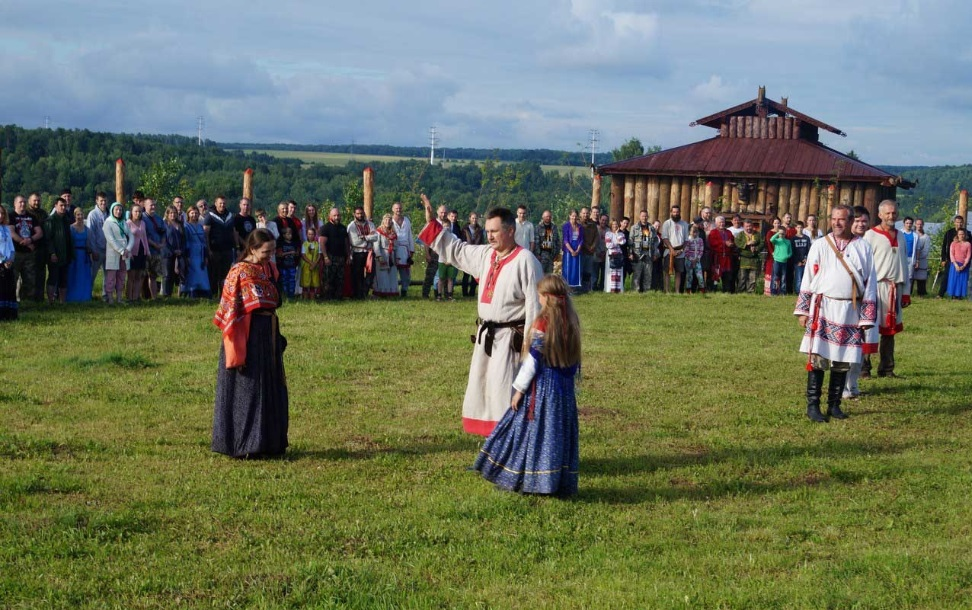
Rodnovers gathered at the Temple of Svarozhich's Fire of the Union of Slavic Native Belief Communities, in Krasotinka, Kaluga Oblast, Russia, to celebrate Perun Day.

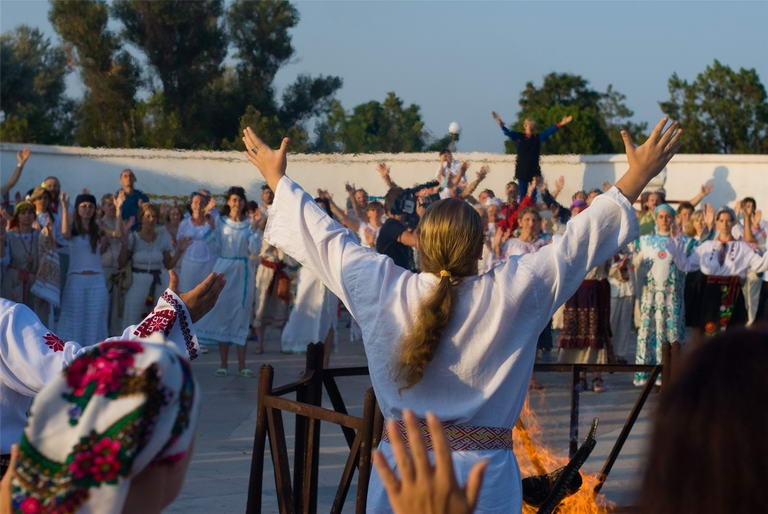
Worship ceremony led by the priests of the Ukrainian organisation Ancestral Fire of Slavic Native Faith

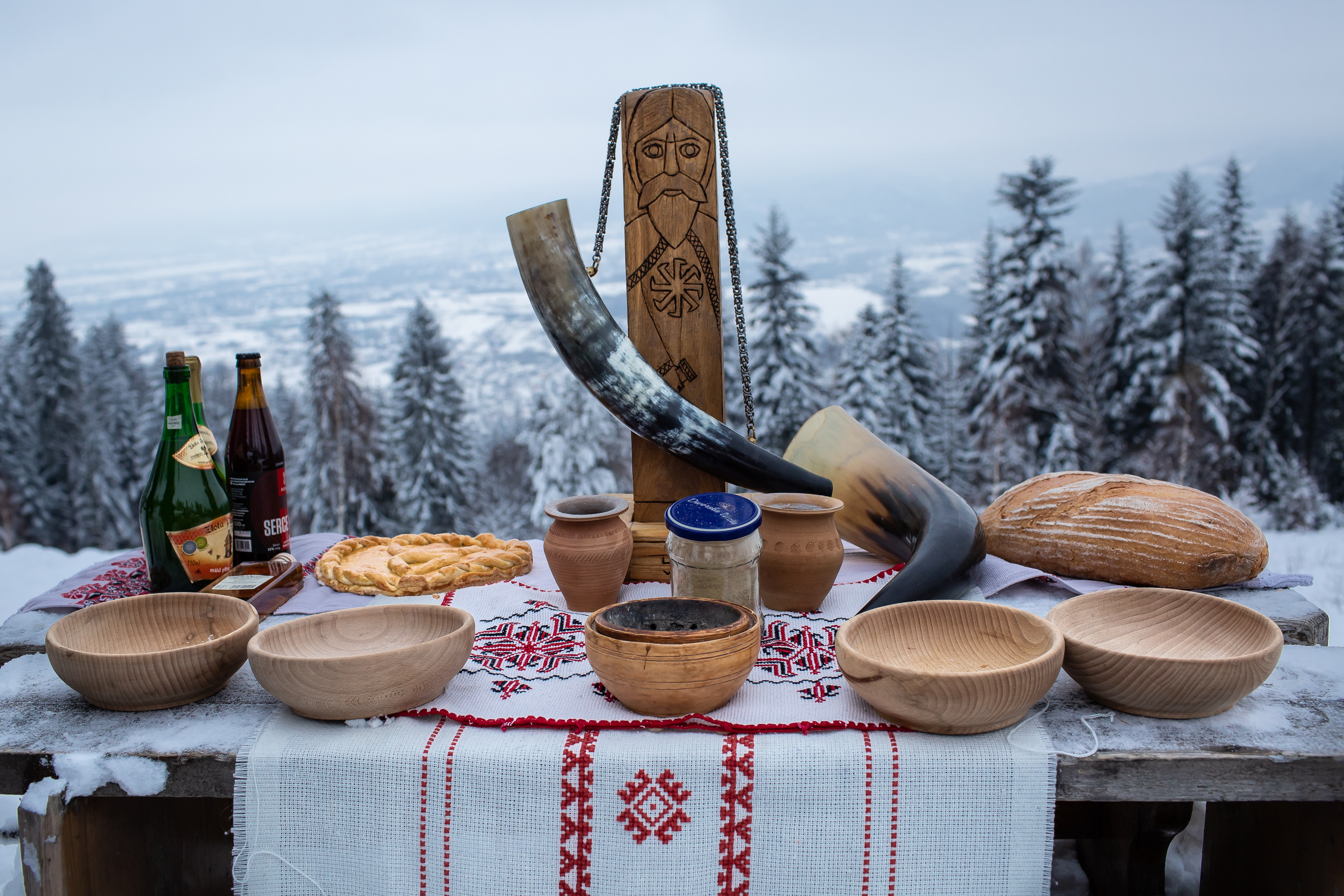
A Polish Rodnover outdoor altar

The Slavic Native Faith, commonly known as Rodnovery, (Note: The term is derived from the Proto-Slavic roots *rod (род), which means anything which is "indigenous", "ancestral" and "native", also "genus", "generation", "kin", "race" (e.g. Russian родная rodnaya or родной rodnoy), and is also the name of the universe's supreme god according to Slavic knowledge; and *vera, which means "faith", "religion". The term has many emic variations, all of which are compounds, in different Slavic languages, including: Belarusian: Раднавер'е, romanized: Radnavierje; Bulgarian: Родноверие, romanized: Rodnoverie; Bosnian: Родновјерје, romanized: Rodnovjerje; Macedonian: Родноверие, romanized: Rodnoverie; Czech: Rodnověří; Croatian: Rodnovjerje; Montenegrin: Родновјерје, romanized: Rodnovjerje; Polish: Rodzimowierstwo; Rodzima Wiara; Russian: Родноверие, romanized: Rodnovjerije; Slovak: Rodnoverie; Slovene: Rodnoverstvo; Serbian: Родноверје, romanized: Rodnoverje; Ukrainian: Рідновірство; Рідновір'я, romanized: Ridnovirstvo; Ridnovirja; From some variations of the term, the English adaptations "Rodnovery" and its adjective "Rodnover(s)" have taken foothold in English-language literature, supported and used by Rodnovers themselves.) is a polytheistic religion. Classified as a new religious movement, its practitioners hearken back to the historical belief systems of the Slavic peoples of Central and Eastern Europe, though the movement is inclusive of external influences and hosts a variety of currents. "Rodnovery" is a widely accepted self-descriptor within the community, although there are Rodnover organisations which further characterise the religion as Vedism, Orthodoxy, and Old Belief.

Many Rodnovers regard their religion as a faithful continuation of the ancient beliefs that survived as a folk religion or a conscious "double belief" following the Christianisation of the Slavs in the Middle Ages. Rodnovery draws upon surviving historical and archaeological sources and folk religion, often integrating them with non-Slavic sources such as Hinduism (because they are believed to come from the same Proto-Indo-European source). Rodnover theology and cosmology may be described as henotheism and polytheism—worship of the supreme God of the universe and worship of the multiple gods, the ancestors and the spirits of nature who are identified in Slavic culture. Adherents of Rodnovery usually meet in groups in order to perform religious ceremonies. These ceremonies typically entail the invocation of gods, the offering of sacrifices and the pouring of libations, dances and communal meals.

Rodnover organisations often characterise themselves as ethnic religions, emphasising their belief that the religion is bound to Slavic ethnicity. This frequently manifests as nationalism and racism. Rodnovers often glorify Slavic history, criticising the impact of Christianity on Slavic countries and arguing that they will play a central role in the world's future. Rodnovers oppose Christianity, characterizing it as a "mono-ideology". Rodnover ethical thinking emphasises the good of the collective over the rights of the individual. The religion is patriarchal, and attitudes towards sex and gender are generally conservative. Rodnovery has developed strains of political and identitary philosophy.

The contemporary organised Rodnovery movement arose from a multiplicity of sources and charismatic leaders just on the brink of the collapse of the Soviet Union and it spread rapidly during the mid-1990s and 2000s. Antecedents of Rodnovery existed in late 18th- and 19th-century Slavic Romanticism, which glorified the pre-Christian beliefs of Slavic societies. Active religious practitioners who were devoted to establishing the Slavic Native Faith appeared in Poland and Ukraine during the 1930s and 1940s, while the Soviet Union under the leadership of Joseph Stalin promoted research into the ancient Slavic religion. Following the Second World War and the establishment of communist states throughout the Eastern Bloc, new variants of Rodnovery were established by Slavic emigrants who lived in Western countries; later, especially after the collapse of the Soviet Union, they were introduced into Central and Eastern European countries. In recent times, the movement has been increasingly studied by academic scholars.

== Overview ==
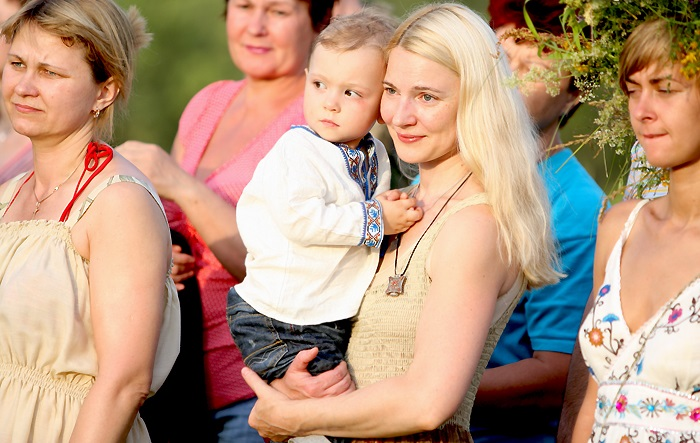
Russian Rodnover women with child

Scholars of religion regard Slavic Native Faith as a modern Pagan religion. They also characterise it as a new religious movement. The movement has no overarching structure, or accepted religious authority, and contains much diversity in terms of belief and practice. The sociologist of religion Kaarina Aitamurto has suggested that Rodnovery is sufficiently heterogeneous that it could be regarded not as a singular religion but as "an umbrella term that gathers together various forms of religiosity". The historian Marlène Laruelle has described Rodnovery as "more inclusive than just adherence to a pantheon of pre-Christian gods".

The scholar of religion Alexey Gaidukov has described "Slavic Neopaganism" as a term pertaining to "all quasi-religious, political, ideological and philosophical systems which are based on the reconstruction and construction of pre-Christian Slavic traditions". The scholar of religion Adrian Ivakhiv has defined Rodnovery as a movement which "harkens back to the pre-Christian beliefs and practices of ancient Slavic peoples", while according to the historian and ethnologist Victor A. Schnirelmann, Rodnovers present themselves as "followers of some genuine pre-Christian Slavic, Russian or Slavic-Aryan Paganism".

Some involved in the movement avoid calling their belief system either "paganism" or "religion". Many Rodnovers refer to their belief system as an "ethnic religion", and Rodnover groups were involved in establishing the European Congress of Ethnic Religions. The usage of this term suggests that the religion is restricted to a particular ethnic group. Some practitioners regard "ethnic religion" as a term synonymous with "Native Faith", but others perceive a distinction between the two terms. Laruelle has emphasised that Rodnovery "cannot necessarily be defined as a religion in the strict sense"; some adherents prefer to define it as a "spirituality" (dukhovnost), "wisdom" (mudrost), or a "philosophy" or "worldview" (mirovozzrenie).

According to Schnirelmann, it was the Soviet Union's official scientific atheism, which severely weakened the infrastructure of universalist religions, combined with anti-Westernism and the research of intellectuals into an ancient "Vedic" religion of Russia, that paved the way for the rise of Rodnovery and other modern Paganisms in Eastern Europe. After the Soviet Union, the pursuit of Rodnovery matured into the spiritual cultivation of organic folk communities (ethnoi) in the face of what Rodnovers consider the alien cosmopolitan forces which drive global assimilation (what they call "mono-ideologies"), chiefly represented by the Abrahamic religions. In the Russian intellectual milieu, Rodnovery usually presents itself as the ideology of "nativism" (narodnichestvo), which in Rodnovers' own historical analysis is destined to supplant the mono-ideologies whose final bankruptcy the world is now witnessing.

=== Rodnovery as a new synthesis ===
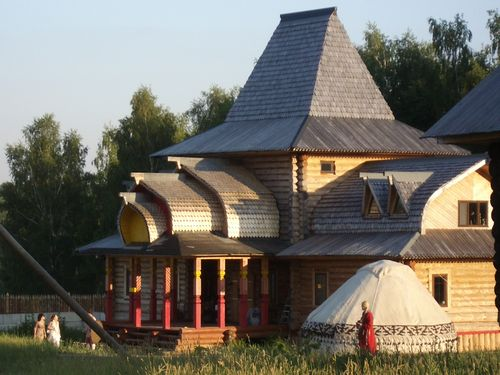
A building of the Slavic Kremlin Vitaly Sundakov, a Rodnover citadel in the Podolsky District, Moscow Oblast, Russia

Schnirelmann has stated that Rodnovery does not actually constitute the "restoration of any pre-Christian religion as such". Rather, he describes the movement as having been "built up artificially by urbanised intellectuals who use fragments of early pre-Christian local beliefs and rites in order to restore national spirituality". In this way, Slavic Native Faith has been understood—at least in part—as an invented tradition, or a form of Folklorismus. Simpson has noted, speaking of the specific context of Poland, that unlike historical Slavic beliefs, which were integral to the everyday fabric of their society, modern Slavic Native Faith believers have to develop new forms of social organisation which set them apart from established society. Textual evidence for historical Slavic religion is scant, has been produced by Christian writers hostile to the systems being described and is usually open to multiple interpretations.

In developing Slavic Native Faith, practitioners draw upon the primary sources about the historical religion of Slavic peoples, as well as elements drawn from later Slavic folklore, official and popular Christian belief and from non-Slavic societies. Among these foreign influences have been beliefs and practices drawn from Hinduism, Buddhism, Zoroastrianism, Germanic Heathenry, and Siberian shamanism, as well as ideas drawn from various forms of esotericism. Other influences include documents like the Book of Veles, which claims to be genuine accounts of historical Slavic religion but which academics recognise as later compositions. According to the folklorist Mariya Lesiv, through this syncretic process, "a new religion is being created on the basis of the synthesis of elements from various traditions".

Some Rodnovers do not acknowledge this practice of syncretism and instead profess an explicitly anti-syncretic attitude, emphasising the need to retain the "purity" of the religion and thus maintain its "authenticity". Other Rodnovers are conscious that the movement represents a synthesis of different sources, that what is known about ancient Slavic religion is very fragmented, and therefore the reconstruction requires innovation. Laruelle has thus defined Rodnovery as an "open-source religion", that is to say a religion which "emphasizes individual participation and doctrinal evolution, and calls for the personal creation of religious belief systems".

==== Ideas borrowed from other religions ====
Rodnovers also use ideas, principles, and terminology of other religious systems. The idea of monotheism is often present: for example, Vsebog in the association Skhoron Yezh Sloven. The Rodnover concept of "Old Slavic monotheism", in which all gods are considered manifestations of a single god, is borrowed from the Book of Veles, which, in turn, borrowed it from Hinduism and "Aryan Christianity".

In most Slavic neopagan teachings, there is a creator God (Rod, Svarog), sometimes regarded as the One and Indivisible who created the world (or worlds). He gave birth to the creator gods of the Earth, the male and female principles (Svarog and Lada), who gave life to other gods. Monotheism can be combined with pantheism (for example, in "Skhoron Yezh Sloven").

The influence of Hindu currents is traced, like Trimurti. In a number of currents, under the influence of "Aryan Christianity", there is a modified idea of the Trinity ("the trinity of three triune trinities" according to Valery Yemelyanov); other Christian ideas are also borrowed. In some cases, "runic magic" and other elements of Western neopaganism are used. The Rodnovers' reverence of nature is connected with the ideas of "natural Aryan socialism" and natural "Aryan" (Slavic-"Aryan") roots.

A number of authors (Valery Yemelyanov, Vladimir Golyakov, Konstantin Petrov, Yuri Petukhov, Halyna Lozko, V. M. Dyomin (retired colonel, Omsk), Yury Sergeyev, S. G. Antonenko, L. N. Ryzhkov) tried to prove that the ideas of monotheism ("Vedic monotheism") and the Trinity were independently developed by Slavic paganism or "Aryan" religion.

=== Slavic folk religion and double belief ===
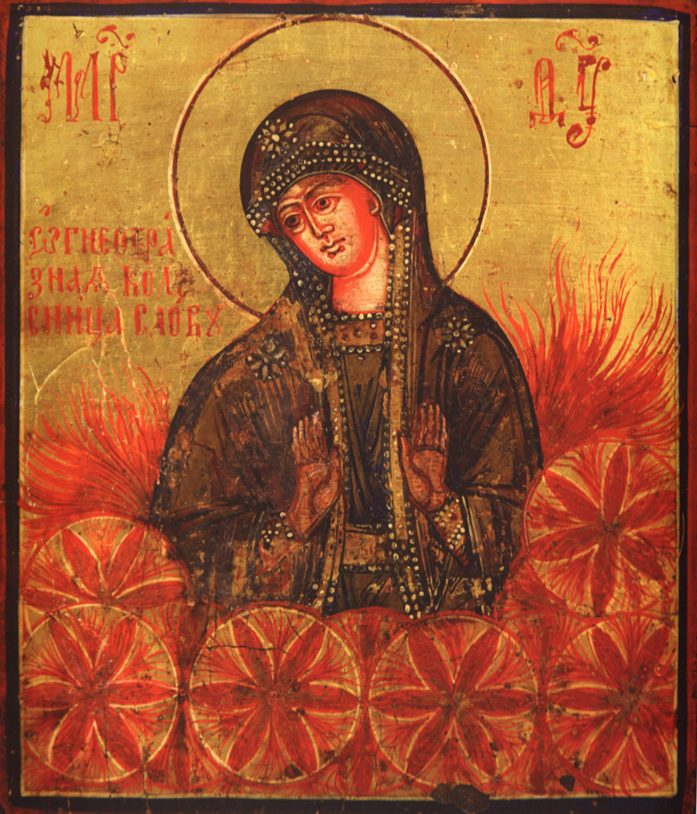
The Fiery Chariot of the Word—19th-century Russian Old Believers' icon of the Theotokos as Ognyena Maria ("Fiery Mary"), fire goddess sister of Perun. Belief in a mother goddess as the receptacle of life, Mat Syra Zemlya ("Damp Mother Earth"), was preserved in Russian folk religion up to the 20th century, often disguised as the Virgin Mary of Christianity. The fiery "six-petaled roses" that surround the Ognyena are one of the variants of the whirling symbol of the supreme God (Rod) and of its sons.

A different perspective is offered by the historian Svetlana M. Chervonnaya, who has seen the return to folk beliefs among Slavs as part of a broader phenomenon that is happening to "the mass religious mind" not merely of Slavic or Eastern European peoples, but to peoples all over Asia, and that expresses itself in new mythologemes endorsed by national elites. The notion that modern Rodnovery is closely tied to the historical Slavic religion is a very strong one among practitioners.

In crafting their beliefs and practices, Rodnovers adopt elements from recorded folk culture, including from the ethnographic record of the nineteenth and twentieth centuries. Practitioners often legitimise the incorporation of elements from folk culture into Slavic Native Faith through the argument that Slavic folk practices have long reflected the so-called "double belief" (dvoeverie), a conscious preservation of pre-Christian beliefs and practices alongside Christianity. This is a concept that was especially popular among nineteenth-century ethnographers who were influenced by Romanticism and retains widespread popularity across Eastern Europe, but has come under criticism in more recent times. Slavic Christianity was influenced by indigenous beliefs and practices as it was established in the Middle Ages and these folk practices changed greatly over the intervening centuries; according to this, Rodnovers claim that they are just continuing living tradition.

The concept of double belief is especially significant in Russia and for the identity of the Russian Orthodox Church and the folk Orthodoxy of the Old Believers; in that country, it is an oft-cited dictum that "although Russia was baptised, it was never Christianised". The movement of the Old Believers is a form of "folk Orthodoxy", a coalescence of Pagan, Gnostic and unofficial Orthodox currents, that by the mid-17th century seceded from the Russian Orthodox Church (the Raskol, "Schism"), channelling the "mass religious dissent" of the Russian common people towards the Church, viewed as the religion of the central state and the aristocracy. Since the collapse of the Soviet Union there has been a new wave of scholarly debate on the subject within Russia itself. A. E. Musin, an academic and deacon of the Russian Orthodox Church, published an article about the "problem of double belief" as recently as 1991. In this article he divides scholars between those who say that Russian Orthodoxy adapted to entrenched indigenous faith, continuing the Soviet idea of an "undefeated paganism", and those who say that Russian Orthodoxy is an out-and-out syncretic religion. Slavic Native Faith adherents, as far as they are concerned, believe that they can take traditional folk culture, remove the obviously Christian elements, and be left with something that authentically reflects the historical beliefs of the Slavic peoples.

The attitude of Russian Rodnovers to Russian folk Orthodoxy is often positive since this "folk faith", thanks to its "dual faith", allegedly preserves the "Vedic tradition". The most common slogan in Rodnovery is "We are the children of the gods, not the servants of God." In polemics with Christianity, most Slavic neopagans show ignorance of the foundations of Christian teaching.

According to Ivakhiv, despite the intense efforts of Christian authorities, the Christianisation of the Slavs, and especially of Russians, was very slow and resulted in a "thorough synthesis of Pagan and Christian elements", reflected for instance in the refashioning of gods as Christian saints (Perun as Saint Elias, Veles as Saint Blasius and Yarilo as Saint George) and in the overlapping of Christian festivals on Pagan ones. The scholar of Russian folk religion Linda J. Ivanits has reported ethnographic studies documenting that even in late nineteenth- and early twentieth-century Russia there were entire villages maintaining indigenous religious beliefs, whether in pure form or under the cover of a superficial Christianity. According to her, the case of Russia is exceptional compared to western Europe, because Russia neither lived the intellectual upheavals of the Renaissance, nor the Reformation, nor the other movements which severely weakened folk spirituality in Europe.

=== Symbolism ===
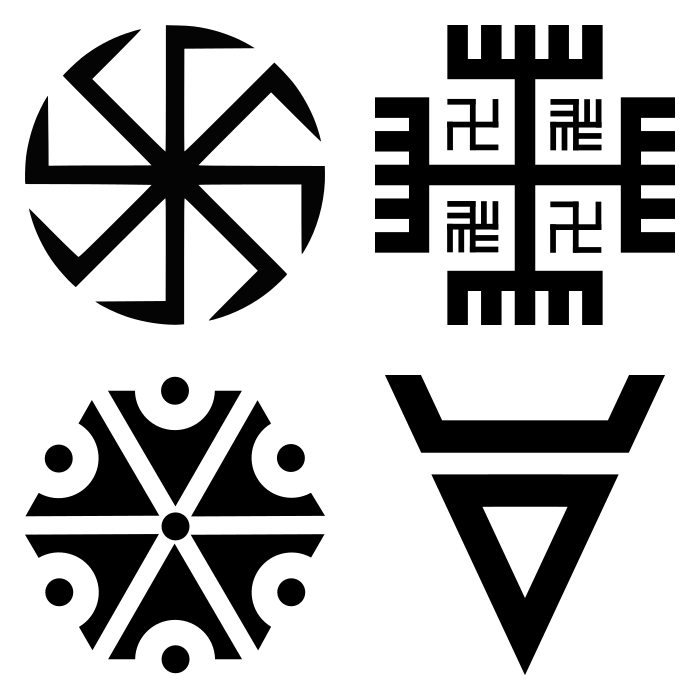
From left to right: Kolovrat, Hands of Svarog, Thundermark, sign of Veles

Ancient symbol the Hands of God or Hands of Svarog, used by the Native Polish Church

The most commonly used religious symbol within Rodnovery is the kolovrat ("spinning wheel", e.g.), a variant of the swastika (Sanskrit: "wellbeing", "wellness"). As such, it represents wholeness, the ultimate source of renewal, the cosmic order and the four directions.

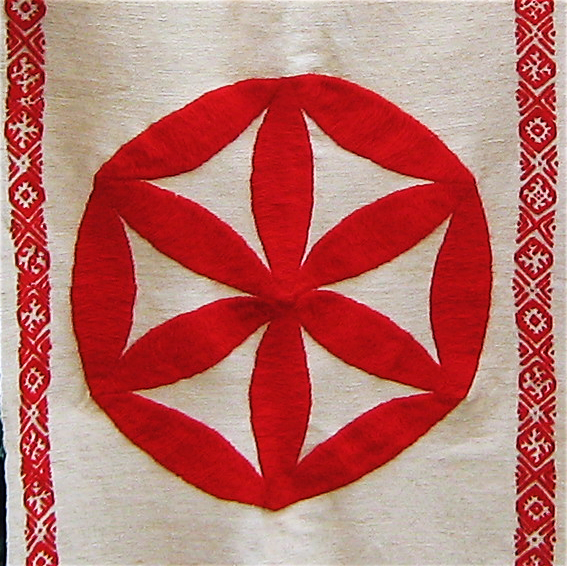
The Hexafoil—Perun's sign, or Thunder wheel—a folk symbol, used as the main by the Union of Croatian Rodnovers

According to the studies of Boris Rybakov, whirl and wheel symbols, which also include patterns like the hexafoil, "six-petalled rose inside a circle" (e.g.) and the "Perun's sign", or "thunder wheel" (e.g.), represent the thunder god Perun or the supreme God (Rod), expressing itself as power of birth and reproduction, in its various forms (whether Triglav, Svetovid, Perun and other gods) and were still carved in folk traditions of the Russian North up to the nineteenth century. The contemporary design of the kolovrat as an eight-spoked wheel was already present in woodcuts produced in the 1920s by the Polish artist Stanisław Jakubowski, under the name słoneczko ("little sun"). According to Laruelle, Rodnovers believe that it is a symbol of "accession to the upper world". For some Rodnovers, the Orthodox cross is another Slavic version of the swastika. Rodnovers generally present their symbols in high-contrast colour combinations, usually red and black or red and yellow.

== Terminology ==
=== "Rodnovery" (Native Faith) ===
The Anglicised term "Rodnovery", and its adjective "Rodnover(s)", have gained widespread usage in English and have been given an entry in the second edition (2019) of the academic Historical Dictionary of the Russian Federation. It means "Native Faith" and it is the name used by the majority of the movement's adherents. The term is adapted from Slavic forms, and variations of it are used in different Slavic languages: for instance, in Ukrainian it is Ridnovirstvo or Ridnovirya, in Russian Rodnoverie, in Polish Rodzimowierstwo, and in Czech Rodnovĕří. The term derives from the Proto-Slavic roots *rod, which means anything "indigenous", "ancestral" and "native", also "genus", "generation", "kin", "race" (e.g. Russian rodnaya or rodnoy); and *vera, which means "faith", "religion". Within the movement, it has also been used to define the community of Native Faith practitioners themselves as an elective group. The term has different histories and associations in each of the Slavic languages in which it appears. The suffix "-ism" is usually avoided in favour of others that describe the religion as if it were a practice or craft (which is the meaning of the Ukrainian and Russian suffix -stvo, thus translatable with the English suffix "-ery, -ry").

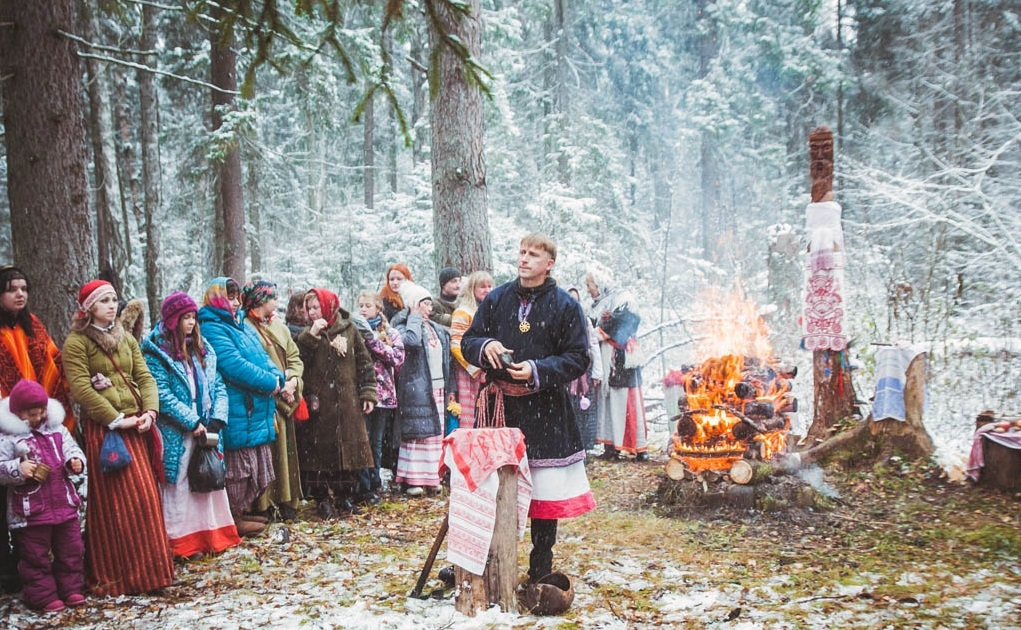
The Svetoary community of the Union of Slavic Native Belief Communities celebrating Mokosh

Sometimes the term "Rodnovery" has also been interpreted as meaning "faith of Rod", a reference to an eponymous concept of supreme God, Rod, found in ancient Russian and Ukrainian sources. Aitamurto stated that in addition to being the most used term, it is the most appropriate because of its meanings. It has deep senses related to its Slavic etymology, that would be lost through translation, which express the central concepts of the Slavic Native Faith. Rod is conceived as the absolute, primordial God, supreme ancestor of the universe, that begets all things, and at the same time as the kin, the lineage of generation which is the ancestral bond to the supreme source. Rodna or rodnaya is itself a concept which can denote the "nearest and dearest", and such impersonal community as one's native home or land. A variant of "Rodnovery" is "Rodianism" (Rodianstvo), which Laruelle also translates as "Ancestrism".

The earliest known usage of this term was by the Ukrainian emigree Lev Sylenko, who in 1964 established a mimeographed publication in Canada that was titled Ridna Vira ("Native Faith"). The portmanteau Ridnovir began to be used by Ukrainians to refer to the broader movement (not restricted to Sylenkoism) by at least 1995, popularised by Volodymyr Shaian. From Ukraine, the term began to spread throughout other Slavic countries. In 1996, the non-compound form was adopted by a Polish group, the Association of Native Faith (Zrzeszenie Rodzimej Wiary) and in 1997 by the Russian Union of Slavic Native Belief Communities (Союз Славянских Общин Славянской Родной Веры) led by Vadim Kazakov, while the portmanteau Rodnoverie was widely popularised in Russia by volkhv Veleslav (Ilya G. Cherkasov) by 1999. By the early 2000s, the term was widespread across Slavic countries. In 2002, six Russian Rodnover organisations issued the "Bittsa Appeal" (Bittsevskoe Obraschchenie), in which, among the many topics discussed, they expressed the view that "Rodnovery" should be regarded as the foremost name of the religion. The spread of the term reflected the degree of solidarity in establishing a broader brand and a sense of international movement despite the disagreements and power struggles that permeated the groups. The term was originally also applied to the modern Pagan religions of non-Slavic groups—for instance, in the Polish language Lithuanian Romuva has been referred to as Rodzimowierstwo litewskie ("Lithuanian Native Faith") and Celtic Paganism has been referred to as Rodzimowierstwo celtyckie ("Celtic Native Faith"), however, "now, especially if you write [it] with the capital letter, the term is understood, first of all, as a designation of the Slavic Native Faith".

=== "Orthodoxy", "Old Belief", "Vedism" and other terms ===
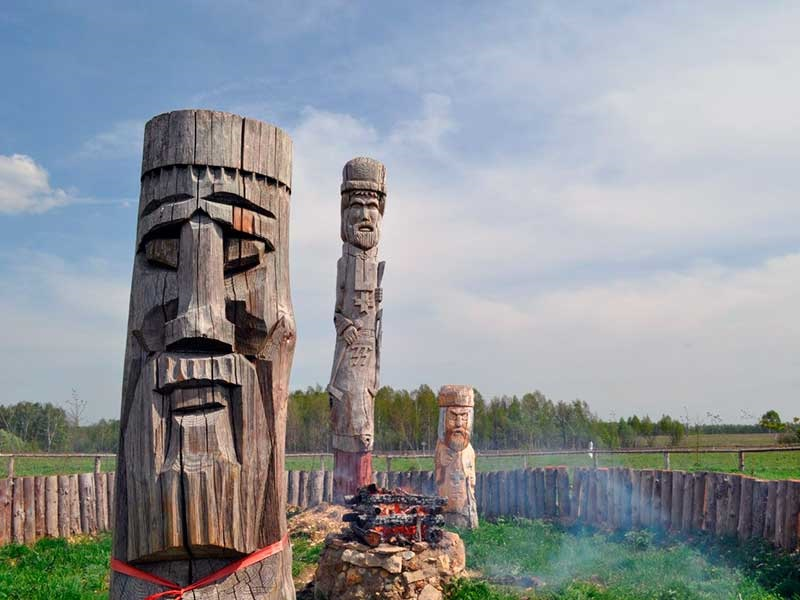
Outdoor shrine (kapishche) at the Temple of Svarozhich's Fire in Krasotinka, Kaluga Oblast, Russia

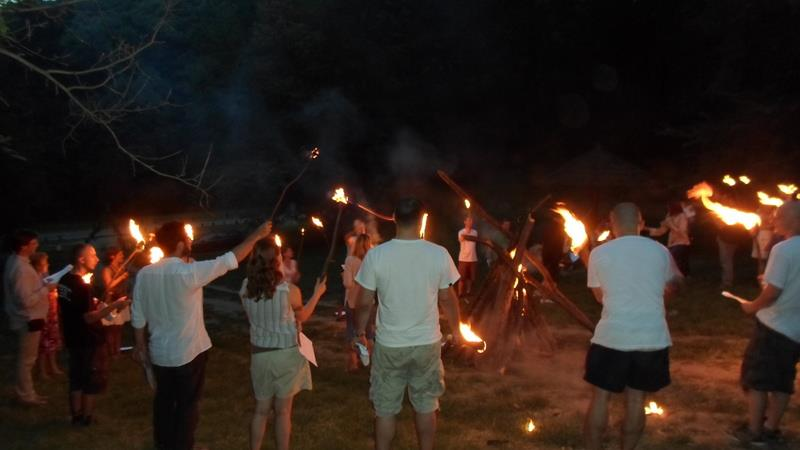
Serbian Rodnovers celebrating Kupala Night

The appropriate name of the religion is an acute topic of discussion among believers. Many Rodnovers have adopted terms that are already used to refer to other religions, namely "Vedism", referring to the historical Vedic religion and the ancient Iranian religion, and "Orthodoxy", commonly associated to Orthodox Christianity. For instance, one of the earliest branches of Rodnovery is known as "Peterburgian Vedism". They explain that "Vedism" derives from the word "to know" and implies that rather than dogmatically believing (verit), Vedists "know" or "see" (vedat) spiritual truths. The term was first employed by Yury Petrovich Mirolyubov—the writer or discoverer of the Book of Veles—in the mid-twentieth century, and later adopted by the founder of Peterburgian Vedism, Viktor Bezverkhy.

In Ukraine and Russia many important Rodnover groups advocate the designation of "Orthodoxy" (Russian: Pravoslaviye, Serbian: Pravoslavlje, Ukrainian: Pravoslavya) for themselves. They claim that the term, which refers to the "praise" or "glorification" (slava) of the universal order (Prav, cf. Vedic Ṛta, "Right"), was usurped by the Christians. Another term employed by Rodnovers, but historically associated to the Russian Orthodox Christian movement of the Old Believers, is "Starovery" (Russian: Старове́ры Starovéry, "Old Faith").

Some Slovenian practitioners use the Slovenian language term ajd, which is a loan-word of the Germanic-language heathen. When using English language terms to describe their religion, some Rodnovers favour "Heathen", in part due to a perceived affinity with the contemporary Germanic Heathens who also commonly use that term. Another term employed by some Rodnovers has been "Slavianism" or "Slavism", which appears especially in Polish (Słowiaństwo), in Russian (Slavianstvo), and in Slovak (Slovianstvo). The ethnonym "Slavs" (Polish: Słowianie, South Slavic: Sloveni, Russian: Slavyane), derives from the Proto-Slavic root *slovo, "word", and means "those who speak the same words", and according to Rodnovers it has the religious connotation of "praising one's gods".

=== General descriptors: Western "pagan" and Slavic yazychnik ===
In Slavic languages the closest equivalent of "paganism" is poganstvo (taking for instance Russian; it itself deriving from Latin paganus), although Rodnovers widely reject this term due to its derogatory connotations. Indeed, many Slavic languages have two terms that are conventionally rendered as "pagan" in Western languages: the aforementioned pogan and yazychnik. The latter, which is a derivation of the near-homophonous yazyk, "tongue", is prevalent and has a less negative acceptation, literally meaning "pertaining to (our own) language". It is often more accurately (though by no means thoroughly) translated as "Gentile" (i.e. pertaining "to the gens", "to the kin"), which in turn it itself renders in Slavic translations of the Bible. Some Russian and Ukrainian Rodnovers employ, respectively, Yazychestvo and Yazychnytstvo (i.e. "our own language craft", "Gentility"), but it is infrequent. Yazychnik has been adopted especially among Rodnovers speaking West Slavic languages, where it has not any connotations related to "paganism". Thus, Czech Rodnover groups have coined Jazyčnictví and Slovak Rodnovers have coined Jazyčníctvo. According to Demetria K. Green of the Johns Hopkins University, Rodnovery is strictly intertwined with the development of East Slavic languages, and especially of Russian language, which preserved embedded in themselves ideas and terminology of ancient Slavic religion over the centuries facilitating its revival in the modern era.

By the mid-1930s, the term "Neopagan" had been applied to the Polish Zadrugist movement. It was adopted among Rodnovers in the 1990s—when it appeared in such forms as the Russian Neoyazychestvo and the Polish Neopogaństwo—but had been eclipsed by "Slavic Native Faith" in the 2000s. However, the prefix "neo-" within "Neopaganism" is a divisive issue among Rodnovers. Some practitioners dislike it because it minimises the continuity of indigenous pre-Christian beliefs. They regard themselves as restoring the original belief system rather than creating something new. Others embrace the term as a means of emphasising what they regard as the reformed nature of the religion; the Polish Rodnover Maciej Czarnowski for instance encouraged the term because it distinguished his practices from those of the pre-Christian societies, which he regarded as being hindered by superstition and unnecessary practices like animal sacrifice. Many Rodnovers straightforwardly reject the designator "paganism", whether "neo-", "modern", "contemporary" or without prefixes and further qualificators, asserting that these are "poorly defined" concepts whose use by scholars leads to a situation in which Rodnovery is lumped together with "all kinds of cults and religions" which have nothing to do with it.

== Beliefs ==
=== Theology and cosmology ===
Prior to their Christianisation, the Slavic peoples were polytheists, worshipping multiple deities who were regarded as the emanations of a supreme God. According to Helmold's Chronica Slavorum (compiled 1168–1169), "obeying the duties assigned to them, [the deities] have sprung from his [the supreme God's] blood and enjoy distinction in proportion to their nearness to the god of the gods". Belief in these deities varied according to location and through time, and it was common for the Slavs to adopt deities from neighbouring cultures. Both in Russia and in Ukraine, modern Rodnovers are divided among those who are monotheists and those who are polytheists. Some practitioners describe themselves as atheists, believing that gods are not real entities but rather ideal symbols.

Monotheism and polytheism are not regarded as mutually exclusive. The shared underpinning is a pantheistic view that is holistic in its understanding of the universe. Similarly to the ancient Slavic religion, a common theological stance among Rodnovers is that of monism, by which the many different gods (polytheism) are seen as manifestations of the single, universal impersonal God—generally identified by the concept of Rod, also known as Sud ("Judge") and Prabog ("Pre-God", "First God") among South Slavs. In the Russian and Ukrainian centres of Rodnover theology, the concept of Rod has been emphasised as particularly important. According to the publication Izvednik, a compilation of views on theology and cosmology of various Rodnover organisations, "the rest of the gods are only his faces, noumena, incarnations, hypostases", it is a God similar to the cosmos of ancient Greek philosophy in that it is "not the master of the universe, but it itself the universe". While most Rodnovers call it Rod, others call its visible manifestation Svarog or Nebo ("Heaven"), and still others refer to its triune cosmic manifestation, Triglav ("Three-Headed One"): Prav→Yav-Nav, Svarog→Belobog-Chernobog, Svarog→Dazhbog-Stribog, or Dub→Snop-Did. Peterburgian Vedists call this concept "One God" (Единый Бог, Yediny Bog) or "All God" (Всебог, Vsebog). Rod is also "Time" (Kolo), scanned by the cycle of the Sun, and reflected in the turning of the hours, the days, the months, the seasons, and the year.

The root *rod is attested in sources about pre-Christian religion referring to divinity and ancestrality. Mathieu-Colas defines Rod as the "primordial God", but the term also literally means the generative power of family and "kin", "birth", "origin" and "fate" as well. Rod is the all-pervading, omnipresent spiritual "life force", which also gives life to any community of related entities; its negative form, urod, means anything that is wretched, deformed, degenerated, monstrous, anything that is "outside" the spiritual community of Rod and bereft of its virtues. Sometimes, the meaning of the word is left deliberately obscure among Rodnovers, allowing for a variety of different interpretations. Cosmologically speaking, Rod is conceived as the spring of universal emanation, which articulates in a cosmic hierarchy of gods; Rod expresses itself as Prav (literally "Right" or "Order"; cf. Greek Orthotes, Sanskrit Ṛta) in primordial undeterminacy (chaos), through a dual dynamism, represented by Belobog ("White God") and Chernobog ("Black God"), the forces of waxing and waning, and then giving rise to the world in its three qualities, Prav-Yav-Nav (meaning "right"-"manifested"-"unmanifested", but called with different names by different groups), namely the world of bright gods, the world of mankind, and the world of dark gods. The Belobog–Chernobog duality is also represented on the human plane as the Perun–Veles duality, where the former is the principle of martiality and the latter is the principle of mystical philosophy. Triglav and Svetovid ("Worldseer") are concepts representing the axis mundi and, respectively, the three qualities of reality and their realisation in the four dimensions of space.

When emphasising this monism, Rodnovers may define themselves as rodnianin, "believers in God" (or "in nativity", "in genuinity"). Already the pioneering Ukrainian leader Shaian argued that God manifests as a variety of different deities. This theological explanation is called "manifestationism" by some contemporary Rodnovers and implies the idea of a spirit–matter continuum; the different gods, who proceed from the supreme God, generate differing categories of things not as their external creations (as objects), but embodying themselves as these entities. In their view, beings are the progeny of gods; even phenomena such as the thunder are conceived in this way as embodiments of these gods (in this case, Perun). In the wake of this theology, it is common among Slavic Native Faith practitioners to say that "we are not God's slaves, but God's sons", many of them emphasising the ontological freedom of the different subsequent emanations so that the world is viewed as a "dialectical manifestation" of the single transcendental beginning and continuous co-creation of the diversified gods and the entities which they generate. The Russian volkhv Velimir (Nikolay Speransky), emphasises a dualistic eternal struggle between white gods and black gods, elder forces of creation and younger forces of destruction; the former collectively represented by Belobog and the latter by Chernobog, also symbolising the spiritual and the material. Such dualism does not represent absolute good and evil, but the black gods become evil when acting out of agreement with older and stronger white gods.

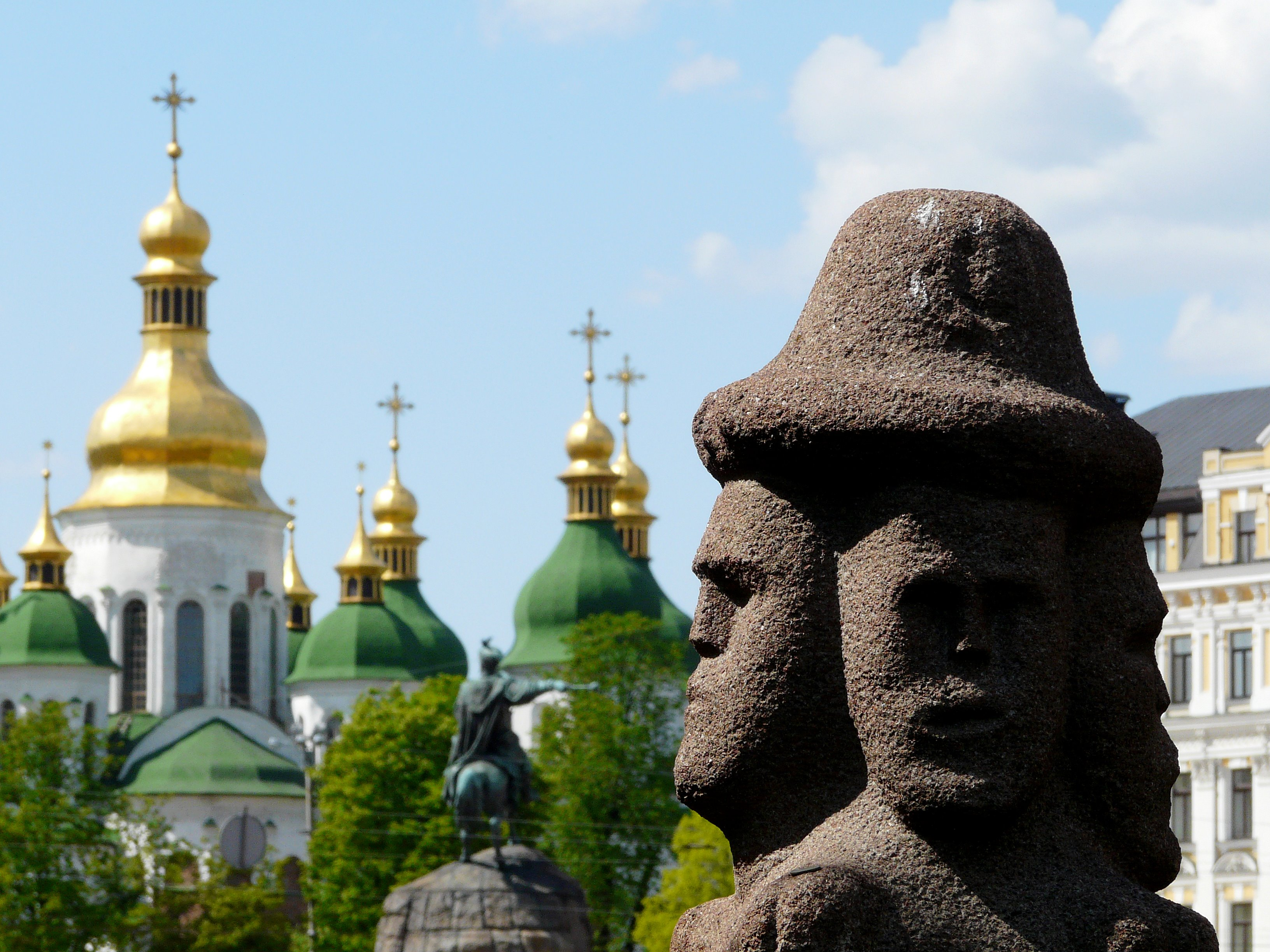
Statue of Svetovid in Kyiv. The four-faced "Worldseer" represents (according to the Book of Veles) Prav, Yav and Nav in the four directions of space.

Pantheons of deities are not unified among practitioners of Slavic Native Faith. Different Rodnover groups often have a preference for a particular deity over others. Some Rodnover groups espouse the idea that specific Slavic populations are the offspring of different gods; for instance, groups relying upon the tenth-century manuscript The Lay of Igor's Host may affirm the idea that Russians are the grandchildren of Dazhbog (the "Giving God", "Day God"). The Union of Slavic Native Faith Communities founded and led by Vadim Kazakov recognises a pantheon of over thirty deities emanated by the supreme Rod; these include attested deities from Slavic pre-Christian and folk traditions, Slavicised Hindu deities (such as Vyshen, i.e. Vishnu, and Intra, i.e. Indra), Iranian deities (such as Simargl and Khors), deities from the Book of Veles (such as Pchelich) and figures from Slavic folk tales such as the wizard Koschei. Rodnovers also worship tutelary deities of specific elements, lands and environments, such as waters, forests and the household. Gods may be subject to functional changes among modern Rodnovers; for instance, the traditional god of livestock and poetry Veles is called upon as the god of literature and communication.

In Ukraine, there has been a debate as to whether the religion should be monotheistic or polytheistic. In keeping with the pre-Christian belief systems of the region, the groups who inherit Volodymyr Shaian's tradition, among others, espouse polytheism. Conversely, Sylenko's Native Ukrainian National Faith (RUNVira; also called "Sylenkoism") regards itself as monotheistic and focuses its worship upon a single God whom the movement identifies with the name Dazhbog, regarded as the life-giving energy of the cosmos. Sylenko characterised Dazhbog as "light, endlessness, gravitation, eternity, movement, action, the energy of unconscious and conscious being". Based on this description, Ivakhiv argued that Sylenkoite theology might better be regarded as pantheistic or panentheistic rather than monotheistic. Sylenko acknowledged that the ancient Slavs were polytheists but believed that a monotheistic view reflected an evolution in human spiritual development and thus should be adopted. A similar view is espoused by Russian Ynglism, while another distinctively monotheistic Rodnover movement that has been compared to Sylenkoism is Russian Kandybaism. Lesiv reported about a Sylenkoite follower who said that "we cannot believe in various forest, field and water spirits today. Yes, our ancestors believed in these things but we should not any longer", as polytheism is regarded as obsolete within the religion. Some polytheist Rodnovers have deemed the view adopted by Sylenko's followers as an inauthentic approach to the religion.

==== Perun ====
Perun is considered a thunderer, the god of warriors and a rival of Veles, and the embodiment of spring thunderstorms that fertilize the earth. According to the book Dezionization by Valery Yemelyanov, one of the founders of Russian neopaganism, in the ideas of the "Veneti" ("Aryans"), there was a "trinity of three triune trinities": Prav-Yav-Nav, Svarog-Perun-Svetovid, and Soul-Flesh-Power. In some currents, Perun may be the supreme patron god.

Since 1992, the neopagan Kupchinsky Temple of Perun has been operating in St. Petersburg. The name of Perun is common in the names of neopagan associations (e.g., Izhevsk Slavic Community "Children of Perun", Pyatigorsk Slavic Community "Children of Perun", "Perun Community" in Krasnoyarsk Krai, Dnipropetrovsk Community of the Sicheslavsky Natural Icon "Perun's Sign" "Slavic Community of the Temple of the Wisdom of Perun"—the latter was part of the Ynglism movement). In Novokuznetsk, a "Slavic Community" publishes the magazine Perun. There was also a magazine titled Wrath of Perun.

Alexander Belov's Slavic-Goritsa wrestling is based on an ideology built on the cult of Perun, military honor, and valor, and it has many followers in Russia. In Slavic-Goritsa wrestling, the fourth day of the week is dedicated to Perun. In Belov's calendar (1998), Gromovik (Perun's Day) falls on July 23. In Omsk, the followers of Ynglism created an "Old Russian temple" named the "Temple of the Veda of Perun" or the "Temple of the Wisdom of Perun". V. V. Solokhin (Yarosvet) from the organization "Spiritual-Ancestral Power of Rus'" (Astrakhan) held the "position" of "Minister of Perun".

=== Afterlife, morality and ethics ===
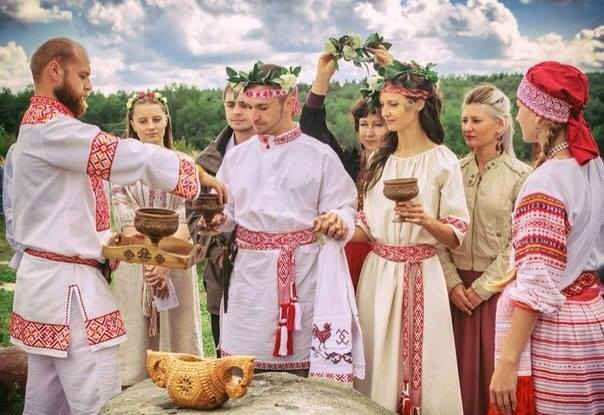
Rodnover wedding ceremony

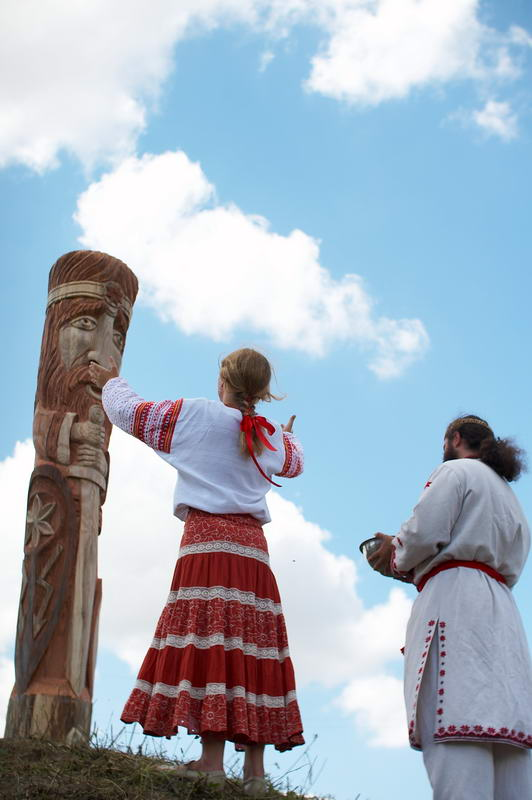
Ukrainian Rodnovers worshipping a kapy (pole) of Perun, in Ternopil Oblast, Ukraine

Rodnovery emphasises the "this-worldliness" of morality and moral thinking, seen as a voluntary and thoughtful responsibility towards the others and the environment that sprouts from the awareness of the interconnectedness of all things and of the continuity of spirit–matter and not as a strict set of rules. Rodnovers generally believe that death is not a cessation of life, and believe in reincarnation only in mankind and in the possibility of deification in paradise, Iriy or Vyriy, which is the same as Prav. Rodnover ethics consist in following Prav, that is "seeking, finding and following the natural laws", which results in strengthening and being aware of the principle of retribution (action–reaction; or karma). Rodnover ethics have been defined as a "safety technique" and as "ecoethics", at the same time environmentalist and humanistic, stemming from the awareness that all existence belongs to the same universal, cosmic God. Although some Rodnovers aspire to paradise, they argue that retribution is not deferred to a transcendent future but realised in the here and now; since gods manifest themselves as the natural phenomena, and in people as lineage descendants, Rodnovers believe that actions and their outcomes unfold and are to be dealt with in the present world. People are viewed as having unique responsibilities towards their own contexts: for instance, the duty of parents is to take care of their children and that of children to take care of their parents, the right of ancestors is to be honoured, and the land deserves to be cultivated.

Rodnovers blame Christianity for transferring personal responsibility into a transcendent future when actions will be judged by God and people either smitten or forgiven for their sins, in fact exempting people from responsibility in the present time, while at the same time imposing a fake moralism of self-deprecation, self-destruction and suppression of the flesh. According to Rodnovers, justice and truth have to be realised in this life, so that "turning the other cheek", waiving agency and intervention in the things of this world, is considered immoral and equivalent to welcoming wrongness. In other words, fleeing from the commitment towards the forces at play in the present context is the same as a denial of the gods; it disrupts morality, impairing the individual, society and the world itself.

Rodnovers value individual responsibility as the cornerstone for the further maturation of humanity, equating the conversion to Rodnovery with such maturation. This emphasis on individuality is not at odds with the value of solidarity, since collective responsibility is seen as arising from the union of the right free decisions of reflexive individuals. By using terms of Émile Durkheim, Aitamurto says that what Rodnovers reject is "egoistic individualism", not "moral individualism". Immediately related to the morality of a responsible community is the respect for the whole world of nature, or what Aitamurto defines "ecological responsibility". Rodnovers are concerned with the oversaturation of cities and the devastation of the countryside, and they aim at re-establishing harmony between the two environments. However, there have been difficulties with Rodnover involvement in the wider environmentalist movement because of many environmentalists' unease with the racial and anti-Christian themes that are prominent in the religion.

Rodnover ethics deal with a wide range of contemporary social issues, and they can be defined as conservative. Aitamurto summarised Rodnover ethics in the concepts of patriarchy, solidarity and homogeneity, with the latter two seen as intrinsically related. Laruelle similarly found an emphasis on patriarchy, heterosexuality, traditional family, fidelity and procreation. Schnirelmann observed that Rodnovers' calls for social justice tend to apply only to their own ethnic community.

Within Rodnovery, gender roles are conservative. Rodnovers often subscribe to the view that men and women are fundamentally different and thus their tasks also differ. Men are seen as innately disposed towards "public" life and abstract thought, while women are seen as better realising themselves in the "private" administration of the family and the resources of the house. Rodnovers therefore reinforce traditional values in Slavic countries rather than being countercultural, presenting themselves as a stabilising and responsible social force. They may even view their upholding of social traditionalism as a counterculture in itself, standing in the face of modernism and globalism.

Ideas and practices perceived as coming from Western liberal society—which Rodnovers perceive as degenerate—are denounced as threats to Slavic culture; for instance, alcohol and drug consumption, various sexual behaviours and miscegenation are commonly rejected by Rodnovers, while they emphasise healthy family life in harmonious environments. Many groups in both Russia and Ukraine have demanded the prohibition of mixed-race unions, while the doctrine of the Ynglist Church includes a condemnation of race mixing as unhealthy. Aitamurto and Gaidukov noted that "hardly any women" in Russian Rodnovery would call themselves feminists, partly due to Rodnover beliefs on gender and partly due to the negative associations that the word "feminism" has in Russian culture, furthermore the traditional stance practitioners of Rodnovery take on sexual ethics by extension leads the Rodnovers to promote "anti-feminist" and "anti-LGBTQ" views in accordance with their native doctrine.

== Identity and political philosophy ==
Map of countries in Central and Eastern Europe where Slavic languages predominate. Green represents East Slavic languages, pale green represents West Slavic languages, and dark green represents South Slavic languages.

There is no evidence that the early Slavs ever conceived of themselves as a unified ethno-cultural group. There is an academic consensus that the Proto-Slavic language developed from about the second half of the first millennium BCE in an area of Central and Eastern Europe bordered by the Dnieper basin to the east, the Vistula basin to the west, the Carpathian Mountains to the south and the forests beyond the Pripet basin to the north. Over the course of several centuries, Slavic populations migrated in northern, eastern and south-western directions. In doing so, they branched out into three sub-linguistic families: the Eastern Slavs (Ukrainians, Belarusians, Russians), the Western Slavs (Poles, Czechs, Slovaks) and the Southern Slavs (Slovenes, Serbs, Croats, Montenegrins, Bosniaks and Bulgarians).

The belief systems of these Slavic communities had many affinities with those of neighbouring linguistic populations, such as the Balts, Thracians and Indo-Iranians. Vyacheslav Ivanov and Vladimir Toporov studied the origin of ancient Slavic themes in the common substratum represented by Proto-Indo-European religion and what Georges Dumézil defined as the "trifunctional hypothesis". Boris Rybakov emphasised the continuity and complexification of Slavic religion through the centuries.

Laruelle observed that Rodnovery is in principle a decentralised movement, with hundreds of groups coexisting without submission to a central authority. Therefore, socio-political views can vary greatly from one group to another, from one adherent to another, ranging from extreme pacifism to militarism, from apoliticism and anarchism to left-wing and to right-wing positions. Nevertheless, Laruelle says that the most politicised right-wing groups are the most popularly known, since they are more vocal in spreading their ideas through the media, organise anti-Christian campaigns, and even engage in violent actions. Aitamurto observed that the different wings of the Rodnover movement "attract different kinds of people approaching the religion from quite diverging points of departure".

There are, nonetheless, recurrent themes within the various strains of Rodnovery. The scholar of religion Scott Simpson has stated that Slavic Native Faith is "fundamentally concerned with questions of community and ethnic identity", while the folklorist Nemanja Radulovic has described adherents of the movement as placing "great emphasis on their national or regional identity". They conceive ethnicity and culture as territorial, moulded by the surrounding natural environment (cf. ecology). Rodnovery typically emphasises the rights of the collective over the rights of the individual, and their moral values are the conservative values typical of the right wing of politics: emphasis on patriarchy and traditional family. Most Rodnover groups will permit only Slavs as members, although there are a few exceptions. Many Rodnovers espouse socio-political views akin to those of the French Nouvelle Droite, and many of them in Russia have come close to the ideas of Eurasianism. In this vein, they often oppose what they regard as culturally destructive phenomena such as cosmopolitanism, liberalism and globalisation, as well as Americanisation and consumerism.

=== Nationalism ===
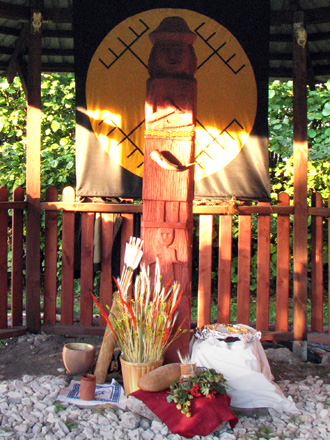
A Mazovian Temple (Chram Mazowiecki) of the Native Polish Church

The political philosophy of Rodnovery can be defined as "nativism", "nationalism" and "populism", all of which render the Russian word narodnichestvo. This is often right-wing ethnic nationalism. Aitamurto suggested that Russian Rodnovers' conceptions of nationalism encompass three main themes: that "the Russian or Slavic people are a distinct group", that they "have—or their heritage has—some superior qualities", and that "this unique heritage or the existence of this ethnic group is now threatened, and, therefore, it is of vital importance to fight for it". There are Rodnovers with extreme right-wing nationalist views, including those who are Neo-Nazi and openly inspired by Nazi Germany. Some blame many of the world's problems on the mixing of ethnic groups, and emphasise the idea of ethnic purity, promoting ideas of racial segregation, and demanding the legal prohibition of mixed-race marriages. Some regard ethnic minorities living in Slavic countries as a cause of social injustice, and some Russian Rodnovers encourage the expulsion from Russia of those they regard as aliens, namely those who are Jewish or have ethnic origins in the Caucasus, an approach which could require ethnic cleansing. Other Rodnovers are openly antisemitic, a category which for them means not only anti-Jewish but more broadly anti-Asian, anti-Christian, anti-Islamic, and anti-Byzantinist sentiment, and espouse conspiracy theories claiming that Jews and Asians control the economic and political elite.

Many other Rodnovers deny or downplay the racist and Nazi elements within their community, and claim that extreme right-wingers are not true believers in Slavic Native Faith because their interests in the movement are primarily political rather than religious. There are groups that espouse positions of cultural nationalism and patriotism, rather than extreme ethnic nationalism and racism. For instance, the Russian Circle of Pagan Tradition characterises itself as "patriotic" rather than "nationalist", avoids ethnic nationalist ideas, and recognises Russia as a multi-ethnic and multi-cultural state. Moreover, there has been an increasing de-politicisation of Rodnovery in the twenty-first century. The scholars Kaarina Aitamurto and Roman Shizhensky found that expressions of extreme nationalism were considered socially unacceptable at one of the largest Rodnover events in Russia, the Kupala festival outside Maloyaroslavets.

Laruelle has observed that even in groups which reject extreme nationalism or are apolitical, ethnic identity is still important, and a good Rodnover is considered one who is conscious of ethnic identity, national traditions, and knows the history of the ancestors. Schnirelmann similarly noted that there is a loose boundary between the explicitly politicised and less politicised wings of the Russian movement, and that ethnic nationalist and racist views were present even in those Rodnovers who did not identify with precise political ideologies. Rodnovers of the settlement of Pravovedi in Kolomna, Moscow Oblast, reject the very idea of "nation" and yet conceive peoples as "spirits" manifesting themselves according to the law of genealogy, the law of the kin. Many Rodnovers believe in casteism, the idea that people are born to fulfill a precise role and business in society; the Hindu caste system with its three castes—priests, warriors and peasants-merchants—is taken as a model, although in Rodnovery it is conceived as an open system rather than a hereditary one.

The scholar Dmitry V. Shlyapentokh noted that it is the Russian right-wing in general to have identified itself with Paganism, due to the peculiar political climate of benevolence and cooperation with Jews and Muslims of the contemporary Russian government and Orthodox Church. Rodnover themes and symbols have also been adopted by many Russian nationalists who do not necessarily embrace Rodnovery as a religion, for example many members of the Russian skinhead movement. Some of them merge Rodnover themes with others adopted from Germanic Heathenry and from Russian Orthodox Christianity. A number of young adherents of the Slavic Native Faith have been detained on terrorism charges in Russia; between 2008 and 2009, teenaged Rodnovers forming a group called the Slavic Separatists conducted at least ten murders and planted bombs across Moscow targeting Muslims and non-ethnic Russians.

The Aryan myth in Slavic neo-paganism is part of a contemporary global phenomena, which consists in the creation of "traditions". The return to reflections on the "Aryan" theme takes many forms. In religious terms, there is a development of a number of movements focused on the "re-creation" of ancient Slavic paganism. In religious terms, it is in the guise of "Russian National Socialism" by Alexey Dobrovolsky (Dobroslav); in historiographical terms, it is the desire to demonstrate the "glorious Aryan past of the Rus"; in political terms, it is the slow transfer of "Aryan" allusions from the environment of extremist nationalist parties of the ultra-right wing to the political tools of more moderate groups (for example, the Party of Spiritual Vedic Socialism of Vladimir Danilov).

According to sociologist and political scientist Marlène Laruelle, the general public is often unable to see the ideological background of the Aryan myth and its historical links with Nazism. In general, the strengthening of the "Aryan" ideas among the Russians remains little studied and little realized.

==== Antisemitism ====
The main threat to the Slavs, in the view of many Rodnovers, comes from the Jews ("Semites", "Semitic race") as an allegedly hostile race to the "Aryans". As a rule, Rodnovers consider Jews as the main source or conductor of world evil and Rodnoverie's enemies. Many events in world history are presented as the result of the confrontation between the "Aryans" and the Jews. Therefore, Jews are allegedly somehow responsible for most wars because they pit the "Aryans" against each other.

The Jews allegedly consciously set in motion various mechanisms that cause negative processes in the modern world; they are trying to establish dominance over the "Aryans" or destroy them, striving to take over the world or already owning it. At the same time, they act secretly and through intermediaries—Masons and Christians. In this context, the demonization and dehumanization of the Jews take place. Often they are depicted not just as a "different race" but as hostile creatures who are not quite people (as hybrid criminals of all three races by Valery Yemelyanov or as "biorobots" created by ancient priests with a specific political goal and endowed with genetically deficient character traits by Vladimir Istarkhov and Konstantin Petrov).

According to Rodnovers, the Jews cannot create anything positive and therefore stole all their cultural achievements from the "Aryans". The ancient population of Palestine is considered to be "Aryan Slavs" or their close relatives, and the biblical conquest of this region by the ancient Jews is interpreted as the beginning of a long expansion aimed at conquering the Slavs ("Aryans") and establishing world domination. Blood libel against the Jews is also widespread among Rodnovers.

The entire Christian period is presented as an era of regression and decline, the enslavement of the "Aryans" by foreign missionaries who imposed on them a "slave" (Christian) ideology. Rodnovers often regard these missionaries as Jews, "Judeo-Masons", or their accomplices. At the same time, the Slavic "Aryan" volkhvs or priests had to hide in secret places, preserving the knowledge that was now passed onto their direct descendants, Rodnovers.

The idea of the Jewish-Khazar origin of Prince Vladimir the Great is popular, explaining why he introduced Christianity, an instrument for the enslavement of the "Aryans" by Jews, and staged the genocide of the pagan Slavs. Roman Shizhensky singles out the neopagan myth about Vladimir and characterizes it as one of the most "odious" neopagan historical myths and one of the leading Russian neopagan myths in terms of worldview significance.

The author of this myth is Valery Yemelyanov, one of the founders of Russian neopaganism, who expounded it in his book Dezionization (1970s). Shizhensky notes that the neopagan myth about Vladimir contradicts scientific work on the issue and the totality of historical sources.

Many of Yemelyanov's ideas, such as those outlined in Dezionization, became widespread: the theft by Jews of the great "Aryan" wisdom, folk etymology of the word "Palestine", Jews as hybrids of criminals of different races, etc. The latter was perceived by such authors as Alexander Barkashov, Yuri Petukhov, Yu. M. Ivanov, and Vladimir Istarkhov. Several ideas from Dezionization were directly borrowed by the writer Yuri Sergeyev.

Under Yemelyanov's influence, several marker terms entered the fantastic and parascientific literature about the ancient Slavs, the mention of which indicates to those in the know that one is talking about a specific ideology but allows one to avoid accusations of antisemitism or racism: "Scorched Camp" (Russian: «Опалённый стан», Palestine); "Siyan Mountain" (Russian: «Сиян-гора», Zion); "Rusa Salem" (Russian: «Руса-салем», Jerusalem); steppe ancestors who traveled throughout Eurasia in ancient times; Khazaria as a parasitic state (Khazar myth), etc.

=== Grassroots democracy and samoderzhavie ===
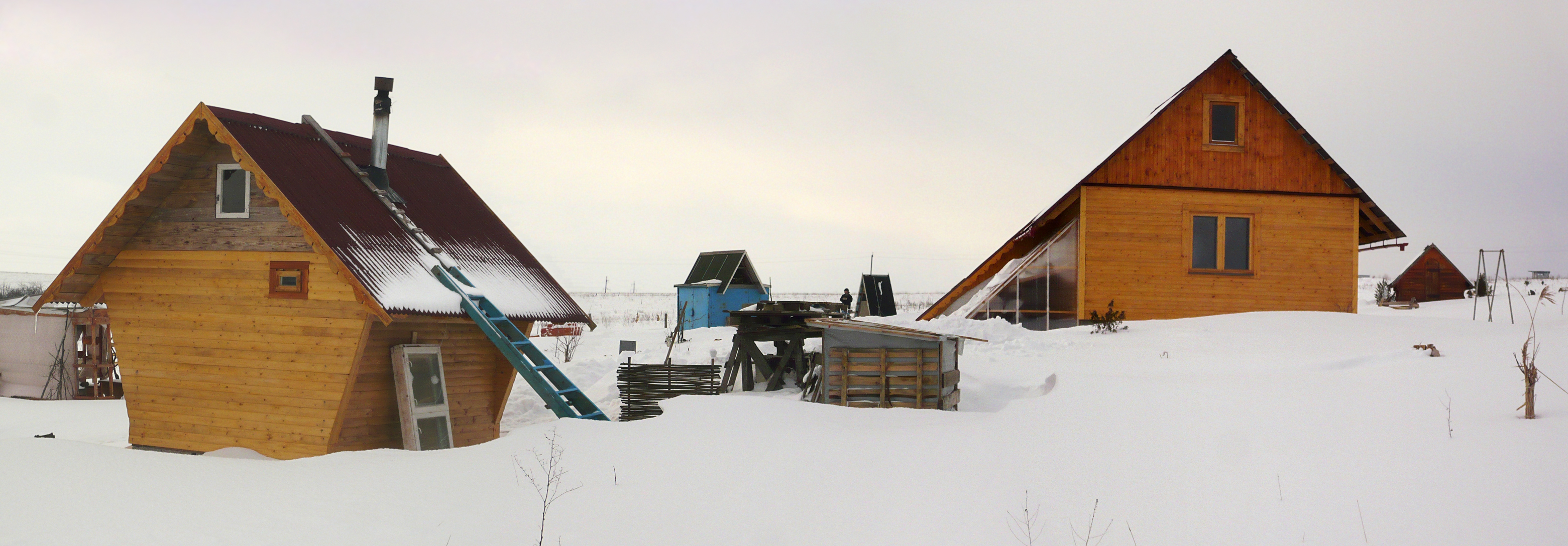
House and bath at an Anastasian village. The Anastasians regard their settlements, based on principles of ancestrality and autonomy, as the best form of self-government, which is expression of the spirit and allows a direct "dialogue with God".

The socio-political system proposed by Rodnovers is based on their interpretation of the ancient Slavic community model of the veche (popular assembly), similar to the ancient Germanic "thing" and ancient Greek democracy. They propose a political system in which decisional power is entrusted to assemblies of consensually-acknowledged wise men, or to a single wise individual. Western liberal ideas of freedom and democracy are traditionally perceived by Russian eyes as "outer" freedom, contrasting with Slavic "inner" freedom of the mind; in Rodnovers' view, Western liberal democracy is "destined to execute the primitive desires of the masses or to work as a tool in the hands of a ruthless elite", being therefore a mean-spirited "rule of demons".

Some Rodnovers interpret the veche in ethnic terms, thus as a form of "ethnic democracy", in the wake of similar concepts found in the French Nouvelle Droite. Aitamurto has defined the Rodnover idea of the veche as a form of grassroots democracy, or, using the term preferred by the Ynglists, as a samoderzhavie, that is to say a system of "self-power", "people ruling themselves". The Anastasians too organise their communities according to their interpretations of the veche, regarded as the best form of "self-government", where everyone expresses his opinion which is taken into account for the elaboration of a final unanimous decision; this process of unanimity arising from multiple opinions is seen as manifesting the divine law itself, theologically represented as the manifoldness of reality which is expression of the singularity of God.

=== Views on history and eschatology ===
Schnirelmann noted that the movement of Rodnovery is fundamentally concerned with the concept of "origins". Historiosophical narratives and interpretations vary between different currents of Rodnovery, and accounts of the historical past are often intertwined with eschatological views about the future. Many Rodnovers magnify the ancient Slavs by according to them great cultural achievements. Aitamurto observed that early Russian Rodnovery was characterised by "imaginative and exaggerated" narratives about history. Similarly, the scholar Vladimir Dulov noted that Bulgarian Rodnovers tended to have "fantastic" views of history. However, Aitamurto and Gaidukov later noted that the most imaginative narratives were typical of the 1980s, and that more realistic narratives were gaining ground in the twenty-first century.

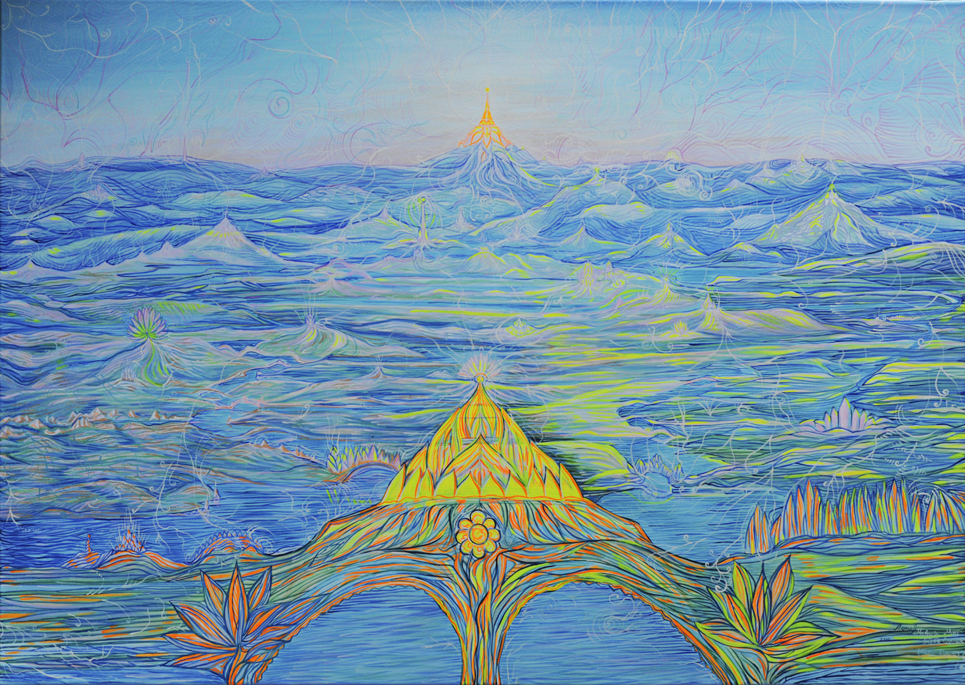
New World. Sun City, by the Russian artist Lola V. Lonli, 2013

Many within the movement regard the Book of Veles as a holy text, and as a genuine historical document. Some Rodnovers take their cosmology, ethical system, and ritual practices from the Book. The fact that many scholars outspokenly reject the Book as a modern, twentieth-century composition has added to the allure that the text has for many Rodnovers. According to them, such criticism is an attempt to "suppress knowledge" carried forward either by Soviet-style scientism or by "Judaic cosmopolitan" forces. Other modern literary works that have influenced the movement, albeit on a smaller scale, include The Songs of the Bird Gamayon, Koliada's Book of Stars, The Song of the Victory on Jewish Khazaria by Svyatoslav the Brave or The Rigveda of Kiev.

Some Rodnovers believe that the Slavs are a race distinct from other ethnic groups. According to them, the Slavs are the directest descendants of an ancient Aryan race, whom they equate with the Proto-Indo-Europeans. Some Rodnovers believe that the Aryans originated at the North Pole but moved southwards when the climate there became uninhabitable, settling in Russia's southern steppes and from there spreading throughout Eurasia. The northern homeland was the Hyperborea, and it was the terrestrial reflection of the north celestial pole, the world of the gods; the North Pole is held to be the point of grounding of the spiritual flow of good forces coming from the north celestial pole, while the South Pole is held to be the lowest point of materialisation where evil forces originate. In claiming an Aryan ancestry, Rodnovers legitimise their cultural borrowing from other ethno-cultural groups whom they claim are also Aryan descendants, such as the Germanic peoples or those of the Indian subcontinent.

Rodnovery has a "cyclical-linear model of time", in which the cyclical and the linear morphologies do not exclude each other, but complement each other and stimulate eschatological sentiments. Such morphology of time is otherwise describable as "spiral". The Rodnover movement claims to represent the return to a "Golden Age", while the modern world is seen as having entered a stage of meaninglessness and collapse; Rodnovery heralds the re-establishment of the cosmic order, which cyclically dies but then revives in its original form, either by returning to the lifestyle and life-meaning attitudes of the ancestors (retro-utopia), or by radically restructuring the existing world order on the principles of a renewed primordial tradition (archeofuturism). Archaic patterns of meaning re-emerge at different levels on the spiral of time. Some Rodnovers consider the Slavs to have a messianic role in human history and eschatology, for instance believing that Ukraine and Russia will be the world's future geopolitical centre, or the cradle of a new civilisation which will survive the demise of the Western world.

Although their understanding of the past is typically rooted in spiritual conviction rather than in arguments that would be acceptable within the academia, in which their historiosophy is often regarded as pseudohistorical, many Rodnovers seek to promote their beliefs about the past among academics. For instance, in 2002 Serbian Rodnovers established Svevlad, a research group devoted to historical Slavic religion which simulated academic discourse but was "highly selective, unsystematic, and distorted" in its examination of the evidence. In various Slavic countries, many archaeologists and historians have been hesitant about giving credence to Rodnover interpretations of history. In turn, Rodnovers have accused academics of being part of a conspiracy to conceal the truth about history.

Like many other supporters of pseudoscientific ideas, Rodnovers often consider their teachings to be "true science" (or "Russian science"), in contrast to "Jewish" "academic" science ("Judeo-materialistic science"), which is allegedly written with the aim of hiding from the Slavs the "truth" about their great past and superiority over other peoples. One of the native faith leaders, Dobrovolsky (Dobroslav), was proud of his lack of higher education and believed that "education cripples a person." An example is Yuri Sergeev's adventure novel "Stanovoi Ridge" (1987), whose protagonist in the 1920s in the Yakut taiga discovers elderly "Old Believers" who store knowledge of "the wonderful beauty of religion, which they defiled and killed", and a secret library with texts, citing the Book of Veles. Years later, the protagonist guards the secret of the library from a Moscow scientist who burns old books.

A number of Rodnovers use pseudohistorical works by such authors as the public figure Valery Skurlatov (also wrote under the pseudonym Saratov) and the Arabist and active antisemite Valery Yemelyanov (Velemir) (author of Dezionization), whose writings were later used by V. A. Ivanov and V. V. Selivanov, under the pseudonym "V. A. Istarkhov" (author of The Strike of the Russian Gods), A. M. Ivanov (Skuratov), the writers Vladimir Shcherbakov, Vladimir Chivilikhin and Yuri Petukhov, the dissident and neo-Nazi and neopagan ideologue Alexey Dobrovolsky (Dobroslav) (author of a number of pamphlets), philosopher and founder of Russian Vedism Viktor Bezverkhy (Grandfather Venedov, Ostromysl), public figure P. V. Tulaev (Buyan), Alexander Belov ("Selidor"), creator of Slavic-Goritsa wrestling, the artist and publicist Igor Sinyavin, Gennady Grinevich, who allegedly deciphered ancient texts as Slavic, the philosopher Valery Chudinov, known for finding and "deciphering" Slavic inscriptions on almost any object, Vladimir Avdeyev, the creator of the doctrine of "racology" (on the superiority of the "Nordic race" over others), public figure and artist N. N. Speransky (Velimir) (Kolyada Vyatichi), founder of the large Rodnover association Union of Slavic Communities of the Slavic Native Faith Vadim Kazakov, the creator of the native faith association Skhoron Yezh Sloven Vladimir Golyakov (Bogumil II Golyak), psychologist-hypnotist Viktor Kandyba ("prophet" Kandy), Ynglist Alexey Trekhlebov (Vedaman Vedagor), "healer" and follower of Khinevich and creator of Renaissance. Golden Age Nikolai Levashov, major general and creator of the Concept of Public Security (KOB) movement Konstantin Petrov (Meragor), supporter of Rodnovery Lev Prozorov (Ozar Voron), chemist and creator of pseudoscientific "DNA-Genealogy" (about the "Aryan" origin of the Slavs) Anatole Klyosov, and others. Most of the authors named are themselves supporters of the "Aryan" idea and Rodnovers or adhere to similar views.

=== Views on Christianity and mono-ideologies ===
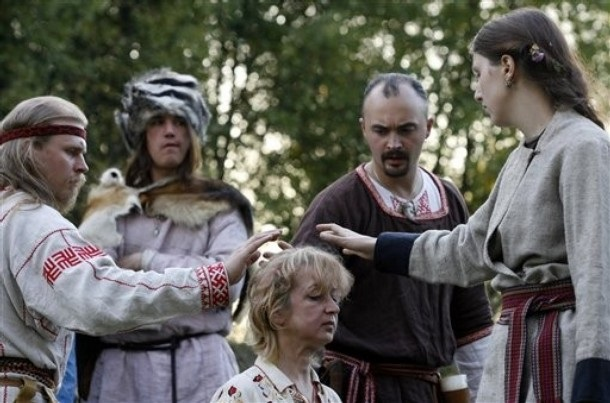
The initiation of a woman into Rodnovery, in Moscow, Russia

Many Rodnovers consciously and actively reject Christianity and the Abrahamic monotheisms, regarded as destructive forces which erode organic communities, with Christianity being perceived as a foreign entity within Slavic culture. They consider the Abrahamic religions and their later secular ideological productions—Marxism, capitalism, the general Western rationalism begotten by the Age of Enlightenment, and ultimately the technocratic civilisation based on the idea of possession, exploitation and consumption of the environment—as "mono-ideologies", that is to say ideologies which promote "universal and one-dimensional truths", unable to grasp the complexity of reality and therefore doomed to failure one after the other. Some Rodnovers also take a hostile stance towards Judaism, which they regard as having spawned Christianity, or believe that Christianity has led the Slavs under the control of the Jews. As an alternative to the "mono-ideologies" and the world of "unipolarity" that they created, Rodnovers suggest their idea of "multipolarism".

Christianity is denounced as an anthropocentric theology which distorts the role of mankind in the cosmos by claiming that God could have been incarnated as a single historical entity (Jesus), at the same time creating hierarchical and centralised powers that throughout history defended the rich, legitimised slave mentality, and promoted humile behaviour, antithetical to the Rodnover ethical emphasis on courage and fighting spirit, and to the theological emphasis on the ontological freedom of living beings. Christianity is also considered as a system that destroys morality by casting human responsibility away from the present world and into a transcendent future, its theology also enforcing a separation of the supreme God from the world. Its anthropocentrism is ultimately deemed responsible for ecological disruption, due to the fact that its theological exaltation of mankind above the world produces in turn an existential model for mankind's technocratic domination of the world of nature.

Rodnovers express their anti-Christian views in various ways. Many Rodnover groups organise formal ceremonies of renunciation of Christianity (raskrestitsia, literally "de-Christianisation"), and initiation into Rodnovery with the adoption of a Slavic name. The folklorist Mariya Lesiv observed Rodnovers marching in Kyiv in 2006 chanting "Out with Jehovah! Glory to Dazhboh!", while in 1996 an Orthodox Christian cathedral was desecrated in Minsk by Rodnovers who covered it with graffiti, including one which read "Christians, go away from our Belarusian soil!". Simpson noted that in Poland, several Rodnovers launched a poster campaign against Valentine's Day, which they regarded as not being an authentically Polish celebration. In Russia, Rodnovers have vandalised and torched various churches.

Christians have also been responsible for opposition to Slavic Native Faith, for instance through the establishment of social media groups against the movement. The Russian Orthodox Church has expressed concern for the growth and spread of Rodnovery across Russia on various occasions. Some hierarchs of the Church have however called for a dialogue with the movement, recognising the importance of the values about the land and the ancestral tradition that it carries with itself, and even proposing strategies of integration of Rodnovery and the Russian Orthodox Church. Some Russian Rodnovers have attempted themselves to improve relations with the Orthodox Church, arguing that Russian Orthodoxy had adopted many elements of historical Slavic belief and rites, though for some by corrupting their original meaning. In this way they argue that Russian Orthodoxy is distinct from other forms of Christianity, and seek to portray it as the "younger brother" of Slavic Native Faith. The Orthodox Christian Old Believers, a movement that split out from the Russian Orthodox Church during the reform of Patriarch Nikon of Moscow in the seventeenth century, is seen by Rodnovers in a more positive light than the mainstream Russian Orthodox Church, as Old Believers are considered to have elements similar to those of the Slavic Native Faith.

One of the founders of the Russian Rodnoverie, Alexey Dobrovolsky (Dobroslav), denounced the "Judeo-Christian obscurantism" that allegedly led the world to an ecological catastrophe. He wrote that the Yarilo-Sun would soon burn the most sensitive to increased ultraviolet radiation, to which he attributed primarily the Jews. The death of the "Judeo-Christian" world, in his opinion, will mark the beginning of "our new era". Only the "new people", the sun-worshippers, will be able to survive. Dobroslav's follower A. M. Aratov, director of the Russkaya Pravda publishing house, wrote about the onset of the Russian Era and the imminent end of Christianity and Judaism.

Vladimir Avdeyev (later the creator of the doctrine of "racology" which espoused the superiority of the "Nordic race" over others; a member of Alexander Belov's "Moscow Slavic Pagan Community") wrote in the book "Overcoming Christianity" (1994) about the inferiority of the era of Pisces, associated with the domination of monotheistic religions, and future blessed cosmic age of Aquarius, designed to return humanity to the original primordial prosperity. Avdeyev connected the future with the establishment of a "supranational, continental, planetary worldview", which should be helped by a "national prophet". The future, in his opinion, belongs to the Eurasian association of peoples, based on the common "Aryan doctrine". Later, Avdeyev abandoned Eurasian ideas and came to racial doctrine.

The cultural center "Vyatichi" in the "Russian Pagan Manifesto" of 1997 (Nikolai Speransky - Velimir and others) on the threshold of the third millennium announced the end of the "night of Svarog" and "the morning of the new great day of the gods."

Victor Bezverkhy (Ostromysl) in 1998 predicted the death of the "civilization of loan interest and slavery" in 2003. According to him, the "races" should be ready for this, so they need to study "the heroism of Emperor Titus, who destroyed Jerusalem." Vladimir Istarkhov, in the book "The Strike of the Russian Gods", predicts that in the era of Aquarius there will be a revival of the pagan gods, and the "Aryan power" will triumph over the "Jewish devil".

== Practices ==
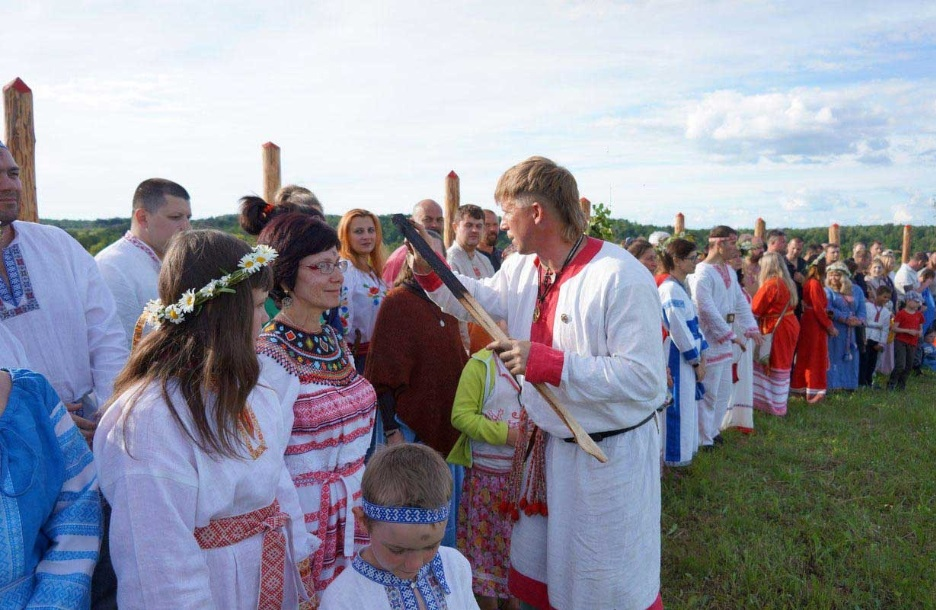
Russian Rodnover priest drawing a dot on the forehead of believers for the celebrations of Kupala Night festival

Rodnovery is essentially a religion of the community, with most adherents actively joining organisations; only a minority of believers choose solitary practice. Laruelle has observed that most Rodnover groups emphasise the esoteric aspect of the religion, organising large communal, popular celebrations, and spreading esoteric knowledge open to all. However, there are more closed groups that require more stringent commitment from their adherents, and emphasise esoteric teachings and practices, including complex initiation rituals, reference to systems similar to Jewish Kabbalah, prayer and magic. For many Rodnovers, greater importance is given to the construction of "authentic" Slavic rituals rather than psychologically empowering practices. For many others, rituals may include magical practices and are meant at the creation of shared meanings and new community ties. Ceremonial accuracy is often considered essential for the efficacy of a ritual, but at the same time Rodnover rituals have been regarded as flexible frameworks, wherein there is room for elaboration and experimentation. Sources that Rodnovers rely upon include valued scholars like Vladimir Dal and Boris Rybakov.

Most Rodnover groups strongly emphasise the worship of ancestors, to continue and cultivate the family, the kin and the land, as the ancestors are those personalities who effectively generated presently living offspring. An example of ancestor worship is the ritual of "Veneration of Ancient Russian Knights" practised by the Russian Rodnover organisation Svarozhichi, centred in Yekaterinburg and widespread in the Ural region, on May 9, in honour of the victory of Svyatoslav I of Kiev against the Khazars. Some Sylenkoite organisations commemorate Ukrainian national heroes such as Taras Shevchenko, Ivan Franko, Bohdan Khmelnytsky, and Hryhory Skovoroda.

=== Ritual, magic and other techniques ===
According to Aitamurto, rituals play "a central role in defining, learning and transmitting the religion", and thus they constitute an important complement to Rodnover theology. Ritual practice makes use of mythology, symbolism, codified chants and gestures. Myths and symbols are considered to emerge from the subconscious of humanity, and to be imaginified sacred knowledge which has to be deciphered and reinterpreted since the true meaning is not always apparent. Among the most common myths is that of Belovodye (the esoteric kingdom of "White Waters"), deriving from eighteenth-century Old Believers' culture. Symbols such as the trident, the swastika, and objects representing fire, are prominent features of Rodnover rituals. The swastika (or kolovrat, as the eight-spoked wheel is called in Rodnovery) is considered the main symbol for mystical ascension to the divine world. Other symbols such as animals, geometric shapes, and ancient Slavic runic writing, are considered to be associated to specific gods, and the prayer to their image is considered to intercede with these gods. Also appropriate chants and gestures are believed to allow the participants to enter in communion with the upper world. Some Rodnovers espouse ideas similar to those of Jewish Kabbalah, namely the discipline of Vseyasvetnaya Gramota ("Universal Script"), which holds that there is a connection between language, script and the cosmos (corroborated by the etymological connection between the word yazychnik, "pagan", and yazyk, "language", which share the same root): the Cyrillic and Glagolitic scripts, and their alleged ancestor, are considered to have magical usefulness to cooperate with the universe and communicate with God, and to see past events and foresee future ones.

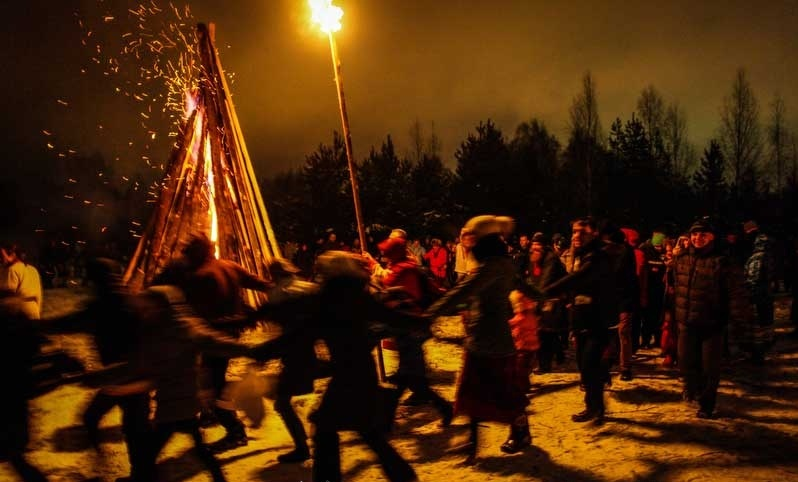
Rodnovers engaged in a clockwise circle-dance around a bonfire, celebrating the Koliada festival in Naro-Fominsk, Moscow Oblast, Russia

Rituals take place at consecrated places and generally include the lighting of fire (vozzhiganie ognia), invocation of gods, the singing of hymns, sacrifices (prinesenie treby) and the pouring of libations, circle-dances (khorovod or simply kolo, "circle"), and usually a communal meal at the end. Some Rodnover organisations require that participants wear traditional Slavic clothes for such occasions, although there is much freedom in interpreting what constitutes "traditional clothes", this definition generally referring to folkloric needlecraft open to a wide range of artistic patterns. Circle-dances may be clockwise (posolon, i.e. sunwise, rightwise) in those rituals dedicated to the gods of Prav (overworld), or counterclockwise (protivosolon, i.e. withershins, leftwise) in those rituals dedicated to the gods of Nav (underworld).

Rituals of initiation include a formal renunciation of Christianity (raskrestitsia) which entails the baptism with a Slavic name (imianarechenie), the ritual of entry into a brotherhood (bratanie), and rituals of marriage and death. The renaming symbolises the death and rebirth of the individual into the new community. Male brotherhoods practise the cutting of a second "life line" on the palm of the hand of converts, symbolising the new "blood bond" that is formed with other members.

There is much variation between major currents and organisations of Rodnovery. For instance, the Association of Sons and Daughters of Ukraine of the Native Ukrainian National Faith (OSIDU RUNVira), one of the churches of Ukrainian Sylenkoism, holds a weekly "Holy Hour of Self-Reflection", in which practitioners read from Sylenko's Maha Vira, sermons are given, the ancestors are commemorated, and prayers and hymns are given, and the meeting ends with the singing of the national anthem of Ukraine. The rival and near homonymous Association of Sons and Daughters of the Native Ukrainian National Faith (OSID RUNVira), also conducts weekly services, but incorporates a wider selection of sources—such as readings from the pan-Rodnover Book of Veles or the poetry of Taras Shevchenko—into the proceedings, and its liturgy is characterised by a more colourful ritual action. The structure of these Syenkoite rites is modelled on those of the Eastern Orthodox Church.

Espousing a holistic worldview that does not create a dichotomy between mind and body, many Rodnover groups employ physical techniques, or martial arts, as means for cleaning, strengthening and elevating the mind. Some Rodnover groups incorporate practices which are not Slavic in origin. For instance, a group of Polish Rodnovers has been documented to use the fire poi at their Midsummer festivities, a practice that originally developed in Pacific regions during the mid-twentieth century. The Ukrainian organisation Ancestral Fire of the Native Orthodox Faith promotes a healing technique called zhyva that has close similarities to the Japanese practice of reiki. In another instance, Lesiv observed a Ukrainian Rodnover who legitimised the practice of yoga by claiming that this spiritual tradition had originally been developed by the ancestors of modern-day Ukrainians.

=== Communities, citadels and temples ===
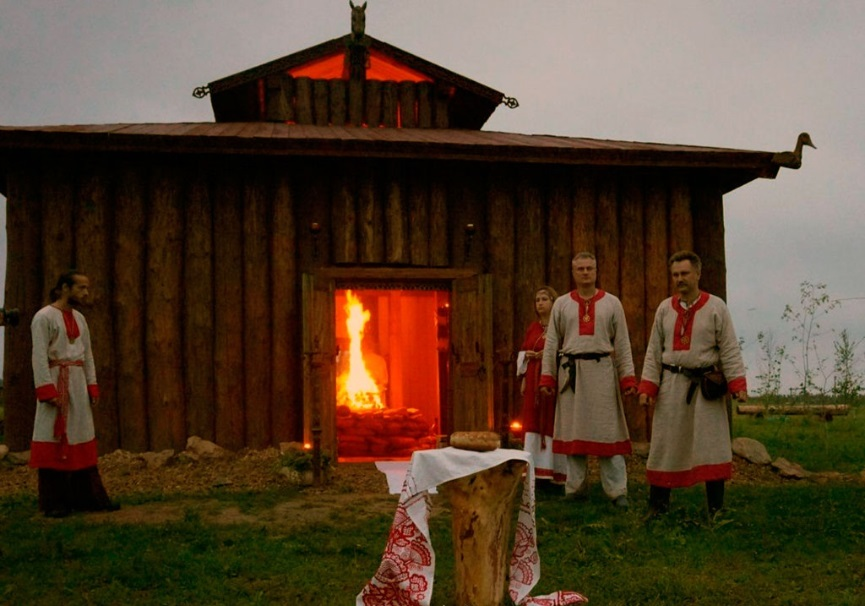
Ritual at the Temple of Svarozhich's Fire of the Union of Slavic Native Belief Communities, in Krasotinka, Kaluga Oblast, Russia

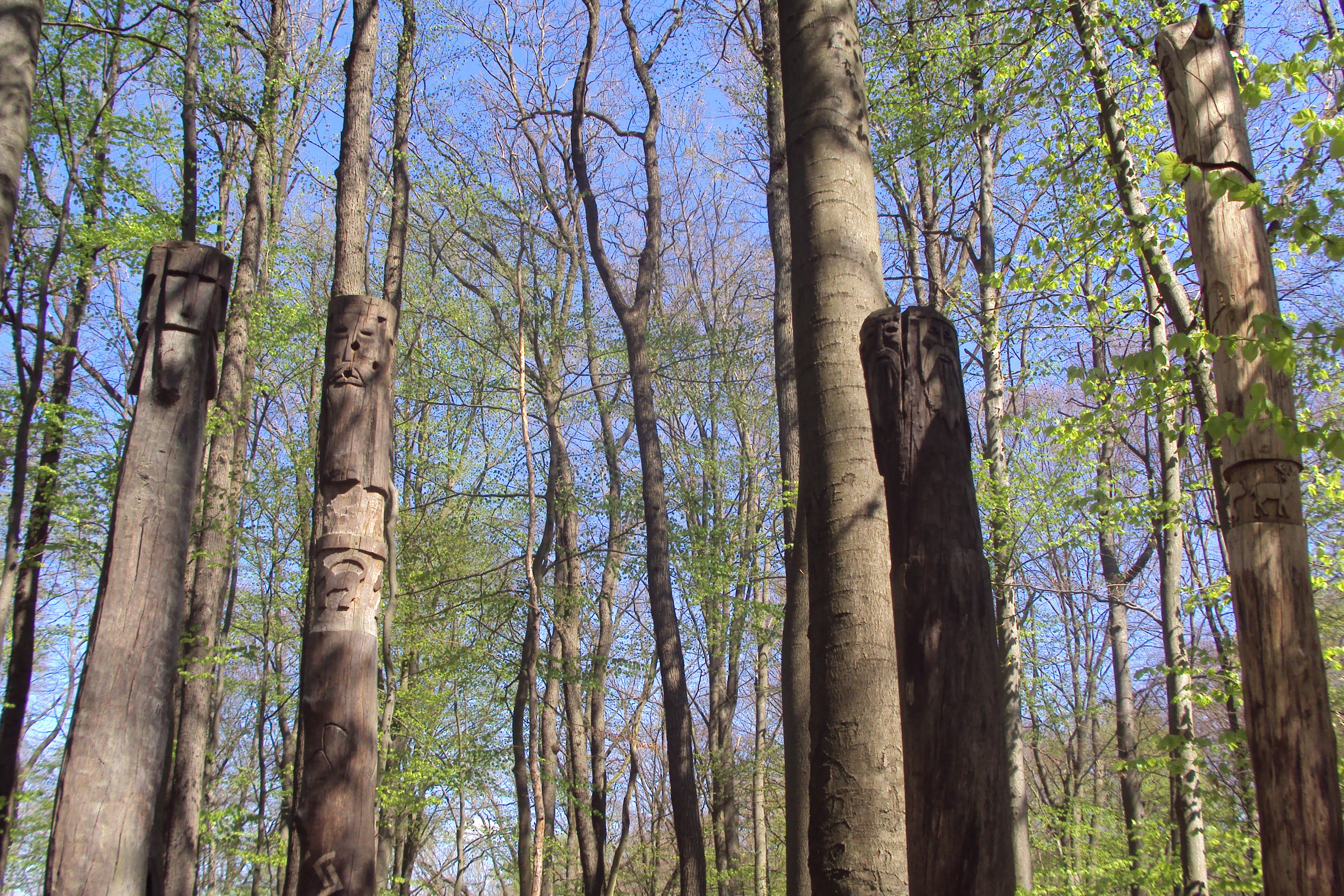
Poles of the gods at a shrine in the Szczecin Landscape Park, in Szczecin, Western Pomerania, Poland

Rodnover organisations have inherited ideas of commonality and social governance from Slavic and Russian history. They recover the pre-Christian social institution of the veche (assembly), which they also see as reflecting the concept of sobornost formulated in twentieth-century Russian philosophy. Veche is used as the name of some Rodnover overarching organisations, as well as international councils. Aitamurto characterises the veche as a model of organisation "from below and to the top", following descriptions given by Rodnovers themselves—that is to say a grassroots form of governance which matures into a consensual authority and/or decision-making. Local Rodnover groups usually call themselves obshchina (the term for traditional peasant communities), while skhod, sobor and mir are used for informal meetings or to refer to traditional Russian ideas of commonality. Another term for a community, though not frequently used, is artel. A form of organisation of Rodnover communities consists in the establishment of places for commonunal living, such as fortresses (kremlin) or citadels (gorodok), in which temples are surrounded by buildings for various social uses. The Slavic Kremlin Vitaly Sundakov is one of such centres, located in the Podolsky District of Moscow Oblast. Some Rodnover networks have established entire villages all over Russia; this is the case, among other examples, of those Rodnovers who are part of Anastasianism.

Rituals and religious meetings are often performed in rural settings, forests and clearings. The basic structure of a temple of the Slavic Native Faith, the ritual square (капище, kapishche), is constituted by a sacred sacrificial precinct, accessible only to the priests, at the centre of which are placed poles with carved images of the gods and a ritual fire (krada). Temple buildings (храм, khram) may be present. The poles, or statues, are called rodovoy stolb ("ancestral pole"), idol, chur, but also kapy. The sacrificial ground is usually in the northern part of the square, so that during the sacrificial ceremonies both the priests and the laymen look towards the divine North Pole; otherwise, in the cases of those communities who give more importance to the cycle of the Sun, it is located in the eastern part of the square. In 2015, the Temple of Svarozich's Fire, in the form of a simple wooden architecture, was opened by the Union of Slavic Native Belief Communities in Krasotynka, Kaluga. Gaidukov documented that in the 2000s Rodnovers erected a statue of Perun in a park near Kupchino in Saint Petersburg, although they did not obtain official permission first. The statue remained in place for some time until being removed by the authorities in 2007 when a decision was made to construct a church nearby.

=== Priesthood ===
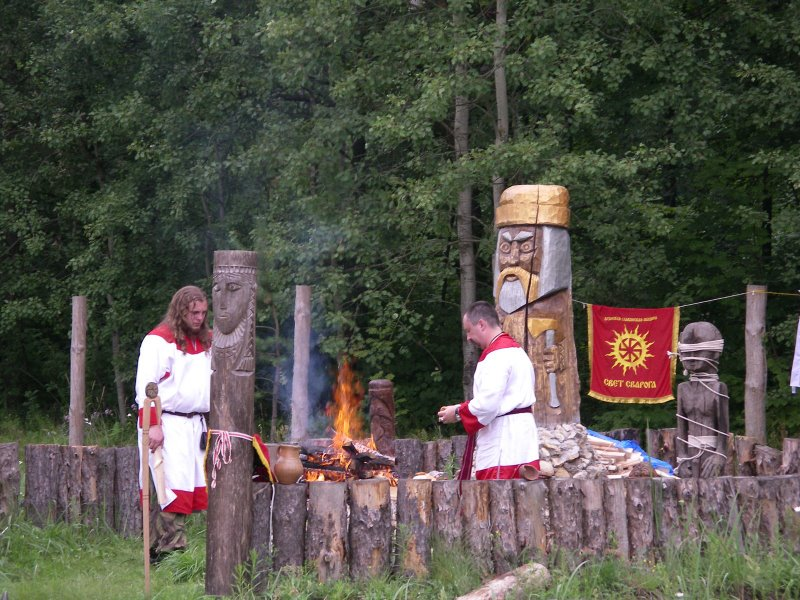
Sacrificers officiating at a ritual square (kapishche) in Kaluga, Kaluga Oblast, Russia

Rodnovery is headed by a priestly class distinguishable into the orders of volkhv (translatable as "wiseman", "wizard", i.e. "shaman", or "mage") and zhrets ("sacrificers"). They are those responsible for holding rites for worshipping the gods and leading communities and religious festivals. Volkhvs are the higher rank of the sacerdotal hierarchy, while zhrets are of a lower authority. Though the majority of Rodnover priests are males, Rodnover groups do not exclude women from the priesthood, so that a parallel female priesthood is constituted by the two ranks of zhritsa and vedunya ("seeresses"). Prestige is not limited to male priests; a priestess, Halyna Lozko from Ukraine, is an acknowledged authority within the Rodnover movement, and the settlement of Pravovedi in Kolomna is governed by a priestess. In 2012, a number of Rodnover organisations in Russia made an agreement for the mutual recognition of their priesthood and for the uniformisation of ordination policies.

The Rodnover priesthood is characterised by a number of attributes, sacred objects which mark their role. Besides varieties of "traditional" clothing and the tambourine, the most distinctive element accompanying the Rodnover volkhv is their staff, conferred at the moment of their initiation, an "invariable attribute of religious and secular power (the sceptre, the wand) in the traditions of the peoples of the world". In Rodnovery, the priestly staff represents the axis mundi, the world tree, the invisible "pillar of strength", of the spiritual power of creation, and it is considered the vessel of one of the two parts of the soul of the volkhv or the representation of their own self.

According to Rodover cosmology: the top of the staff of the volkhv represents the overworld, Prav, and is either carved as an anthropomorphic face representing the patron deity of the volkhv, or as the symbol of Rod, and is associated with Rod itself, the "God of the gods", representing the unity of the generated gods in the universal Rod, or with his visible manifestation, Svarog; the middle part of the staff represents Yav and Perun, and is carved with the symbols of the powers that the volkhv "commands" in the real world; the bottom of the staff represents Nav and Veles, and is burnt in fire to symbolise the infernal forces of the underworld. The wood of which the saff is made is chosen according to the patron deity of the priest: beech and maple are associated to Svarog and Dazhbog, oak to Perun, conifers and hazel to Veles, birch and rowan are associated to the goddesses (Mokosh, Lada, Lelya). The staff is covered with cuts which are vertical lines if masculine and associated with the power of Rod, while a spiral or circle cuts if feminine and associated with the goddess of the Earth. The staff has to be treated accorting to certain rules, and rubbing oils with spells, and hanging claws, fangs, amulets and other objects attached to threads are, considered to accumulate power within a staff.

=== Calendars and holidays ===
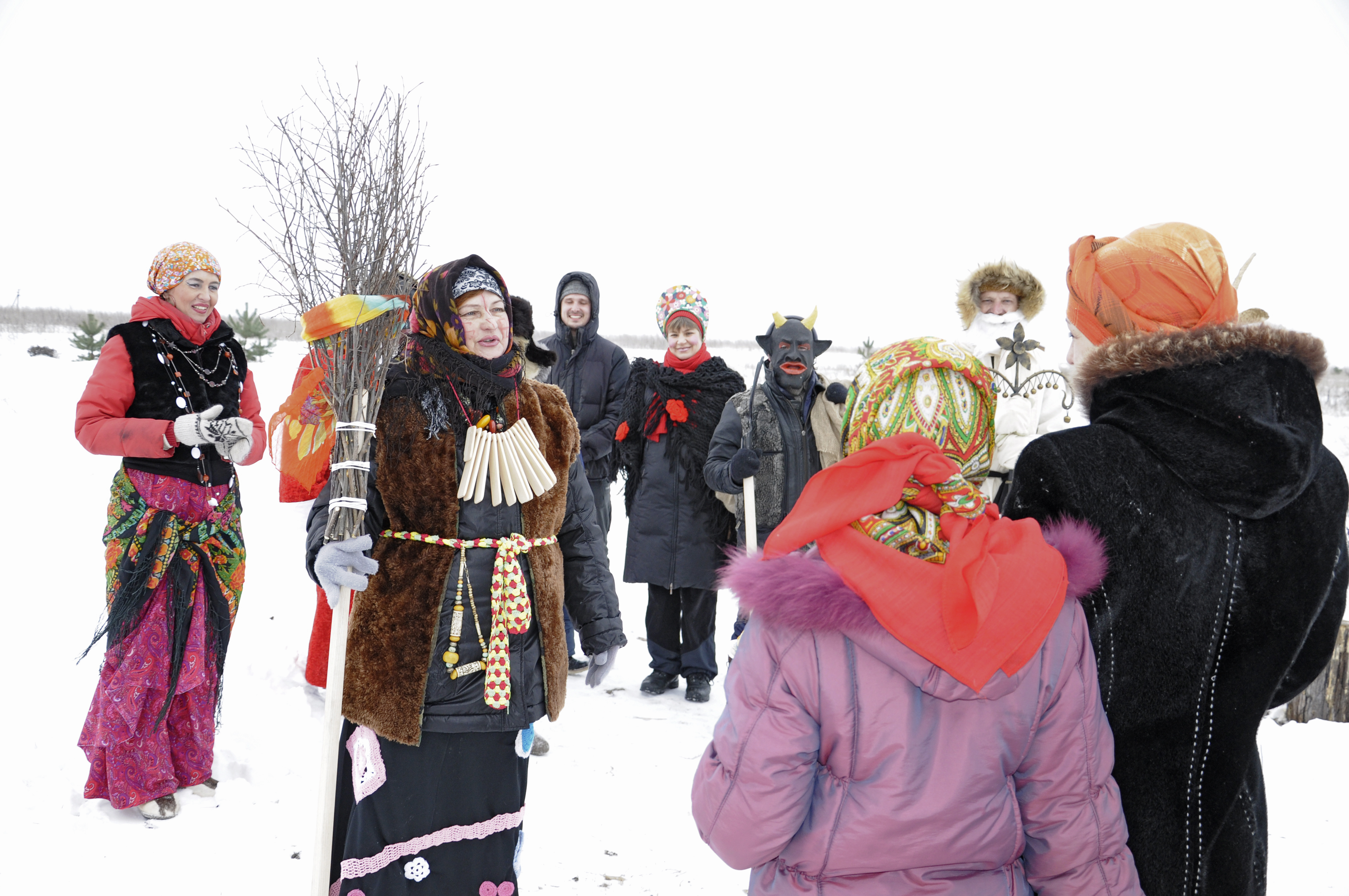
Group of Anastasians celebrating the holiday of Koliada at an Anastasian village in Belgorod Oblast, Russia

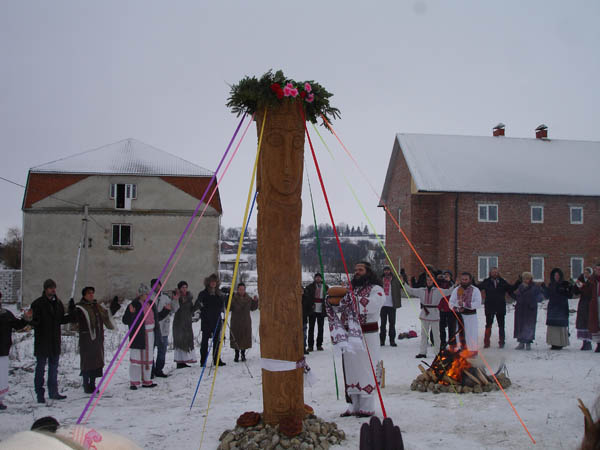
Ukrainian Rodnovers worshipping a goddess' pole on Vodokresh in the countryside

The common Rodnover ritual calendar is based on the Slavic folk tradition, whose crucial events are the four solstices and equinoxes set in the four phases of the year. Slavic Native Faith has been described as following "the cycles of nature", of the seasons of the year. A festival that is believed to be the most important by many Rodnovers is that of the summer solstice, the Kupala Night (June 23–24), although also important are the winter solstice festival Karachun and Koliada (December 24–25), and the spring equinox festival Shrovetide—called Komoeditsa or Maslenitsa (March 24). Festivals celebrated in spring include the Day of Yarilo and the Krasnaya Gorka (literally "Red Hill", celebrated between April 30–May 1), the latter dedicated to ancestor worship; while in autumn Rodnovers celebrate the Day of Marzanna and that of Mokosh (November 10). Other festivals include the Days of Veles (multiple, in January and February) and the Day of Perun (August 2), the latter considered to be the most important holiday of the year by some Rodnover organisations. The Anastasians also celebrate the Day of the Earth on July 23 with characteristic rituals prescribed in their movement's books.

Usually, the organisation of festivals involves three layers of society: there is a patronising "core" of practitioners, who are often professionally affirmed people, usually belonging to the intellectual class; then there is the population of committed adherents; and then there is a loose "periphery" constituted by sympathisers, generally relatives and friends of the committed followers. Aitmurto notes that festivals are usually set in the evenings, the weekends and on public holidays, in order to allow everyone's participation. Shizhensky and Aitamurto described one Kupala festival, held over the course of three days outside Maloyaroslavets in Russia; at this event, weddings, purification rituals, and name-giving ceremonies took place, accompanied by musical performances, martial arts, and folkloric plays, while a market sold traditional handicrafts. The interplay with the gods and the cycle of nature which they represent is displayed through large-scale ceremonies which Aitamurto defines as "aesthetically lavish", vectors of a great deal of creativity. For instance, the end of winter is marked by burning straw images of Marzanna, the goddess of winter, while celebrating the victory of Yarilo, the god of the full swing of natural forces; the end of summer, instead, is marked by the burial of an image of Yarilo.

Adherents of Slavic Native Faith often adopt elements from recorded folk culture, giving new meaning and purpose to Christianised or non-Pagan contents. Some Rodnover groups have appropriated or reappropriated Christian festivals. The same Kupala Night is a reappropriation, being the day of the year when Christian churches set the Nativity of Saint John the Baptist. The calendar of some Sylenkoite organisations includes holidays that have been de-Christianised, such as a "Christmas of Dazhboh's Light" and an "Easter of the Eternal Resurrection".

=== Artistic and other pursuits ===
A number of Rodnovers have expressed their religion through visual arts, with Svyatoslav I of Kiev being one of the most popular historical subjects among Rodnover artists. In the 2010s, Rodnovery entered the mass market culture of Slavic countries by promoting ethnic clothing, ethnic hairstyles, ethnic tattooing, by creating and disseminating its own systems of symbols and images, but also genres of music, cinema and fiction. Some Rodnovers espouse linguistic purism, proposing the replacement of foreign words with Slavic equivalents (such as svetopisi instead of fotografii, or izvedy instead of interv'iu).

Rodnovery generally emphasises a healthy lifestyle of the individual, to be extended as a healthy lifestyle of the nation; restriction of food intake, avoidance of certain foods, and sport activities, timed to significant events or holidays, have acquired a ritual character for many Rodnover groups. A popular sport movement associated with Rodnovery is "Russian jogging" (Русские пробежки, Russkiye probezhki). Rodnover rituals and festivals often include martial arts displays; these sometimes symbolise seasonal change, such as the victory of spring over winter, or can be regarded as manifestations of bravery, strength, and honesty. "Slavic-hill wrestling" (Slavyano-goritskaya bor'ba) was established by the Russian Rodnover Aleksandr Belov. Other martial arts styles that are popular among Rodnovers are "bench wrestling" (lavochki) and "wall against wall" (stenka na stenku).

== History ==
=== 1800s–1920s: Romantic and Polish revolutionary precursors ===
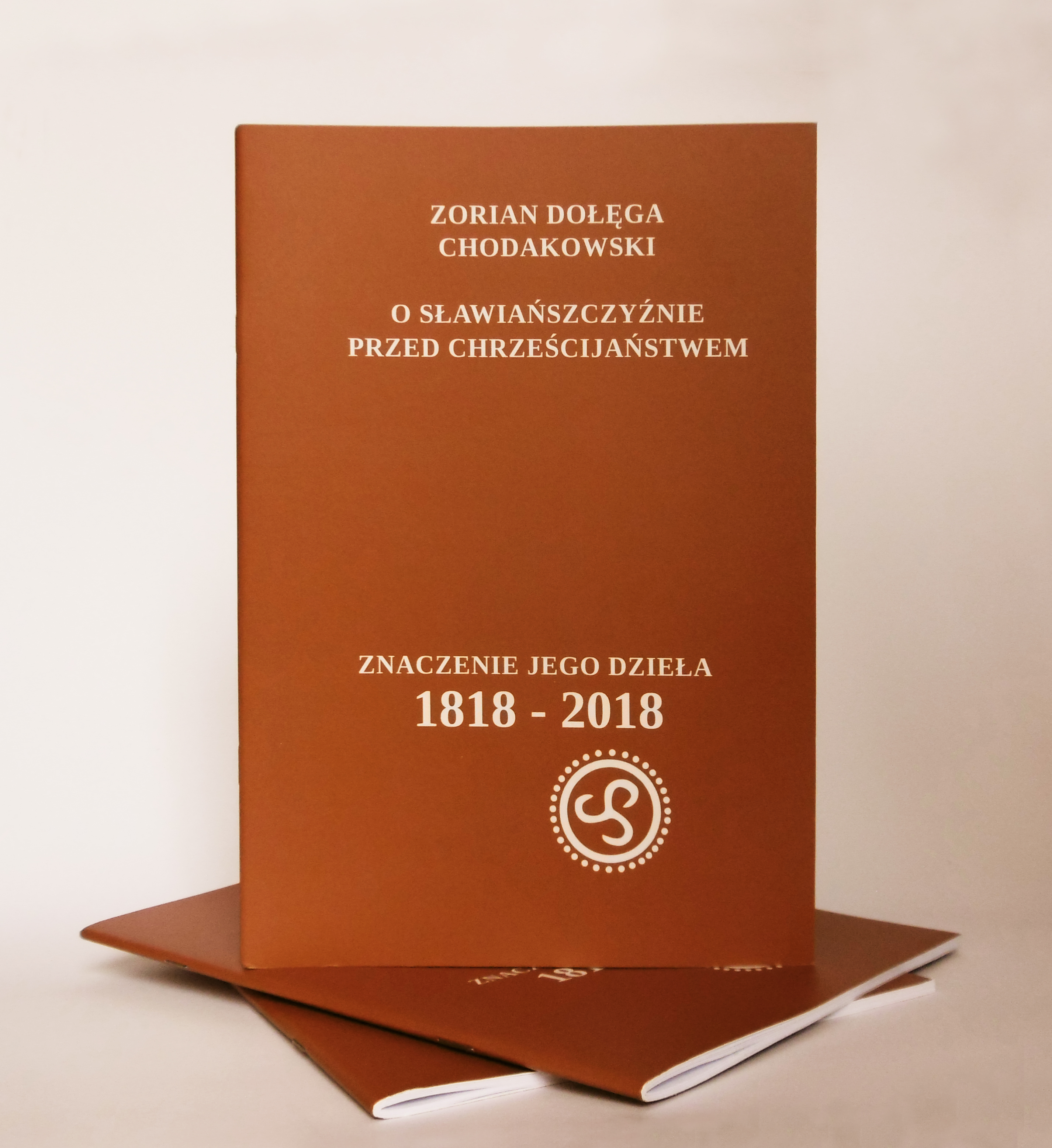
2018 publication of Dołęga-Chodakowski's About the Slavs before Christianity by Polish Rodnovers

The origins of Slavic Native Faith have been traced to the Romantic movement of late eighteenth and nineteenth-century Europe, which was a reaction against rationalism and the Age of Enlightenment. This was accompanied by a growth in nationalism across Europe, as intellectuals began to assert their own national heritage. In 1818, the Polish ethnographer Zorian Dołęga-Chodakowski (Adam Czarnocki; 1784–1825) in the work O Sławiańszczyźnie przed chrześcijaństwem ("About the Slavs before Christianity") declared himself a "pagan" and stated that the Christianisation of the Slavic peoples had been a mistake. Therefore, he became a precursor of the return to Slavic religion in Poland and all Slavic countries. Similarly, the Polish philosopher Bronisław Trentowski (1808–1869) saw the historical religion of the Slavs as a true path to understanding the divine creator, arguing that Christianity failed to do so. In Czechia, in 1839, the doctor and teacher Karel Slavoj Amerling (1807–1884) founded the Brotherhood of the Faithful of the New Slavic Religion (Bratrstvo Věrníků Nového Náboženství Slávského), identified as pantheism and as a means for the Czech National Revival; the group was, however, banned by the Austrian rulers just one year later, in 1840. Another precursor in Poland was Jan Sas Zubrzycki (1860–1935), who elaborated the doctrine of "God-Knowing" (Bogoznawstwo). It was this Romantic rediscovery and revaluing of indigenous pre-Christian religion that prepared the way for the later emergence of Rodnovery.

Whereas calls to re-establish pre-Christian belief systems existed within the German and Austrian far-right nationalist movements during the early twentieth century, the situation was different in Russia. In Russia there was a shared belief among the intellectual circles that Slavic paganism had survived within the "folk Orthodoxy" of the common people (which was regarded as a dvoeverie, a "double faith"), and the Old Believers' movements. The study of this syncretic popular religion and philosophy was the foremost interest for late nineteenth and early twentieth-century Russian intellectuals: early revolutionaries (Alexander Herzen, Nikolay Ogarev, Mikhail Bakunin), Narodniks (Populists), and early Bolsheviks were inspired by the radical forms of society practiced within folk religious communities, which in many ways were precursors to socialism. Vladimir Bonch-Bruyevich was assigned by the Russian Social Democratic Labour Party the task of studying folk religious movements, and in 1908–1910 a faction of the Bolsheviks, represented by Anatoly Lunacharsky, Alexander Bogdanov, Maxim Gorky, and Vladimir Bazarov, formulated the "God-Building" movement (Bogostroitelstvo), whose aim was to create a new religion for the proletariat through a synthesis of socialism with folk religion.

In Poland, Władysław Kołodziej (1897–1978) later claimed to have established an active religious group in 1921, the Holy Circle of Worshippers of Światowid (Święte Koło Czcicieli Światowida), although there is no evidence that they conducted regular meetings until many years later.

=== 1930s–1950s: Early concrete developments ===
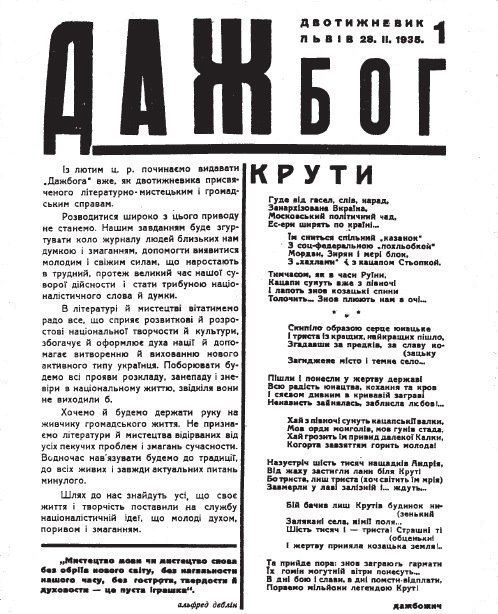
First page of the Ukrainian magazine Dazhboh (February 28, 1935)

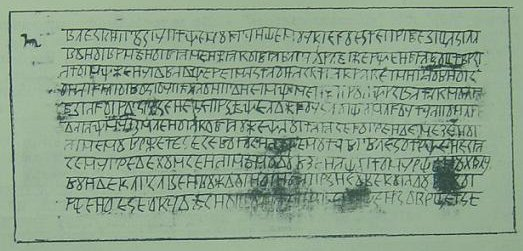
One of the earliest copies (dated 1955) of one of "Isenbek's Planks" (the n. 16), upon which the Book of Veles was supposedly written

In Ukraine, the first practitioners of Slavic Native Faith appeared in the 1930s. The Ukrainian literary magazine Dazhboh, published in 1931–1935, was imbued with Neopagan ideas (Bohdan Ihor Antonych and others). One of the most influential Ukrainian Rodnover ideologues was Volodymyr Shaian (1908–1974), a linguist and philologist who worked at Lviv University. He claimed that in 1934 he underwent a spiritual revelation atop Mount Grekhit in the Carpathian Mountains. Particularly interested in the ideas about an ancient Aryan race that were popular at the time, he subsequently began promoting what he called a "pan-Aryan renaissance". He turned to recorded Ukrainian folklore to find what he regarded as the survivals of the ancient Slavic religion. In 1944, he fled the Soviet government and travelled to refugee camps in Germany and Austria. There, he established the Order of the Knights of the Solar God (Orden Lytsariv Boha Sontsia), a religio-political group that he hoped would affiliate itself to the Ukrainian Insurgent Army during the Second World War.

In Poland, Jan Stachniuk (1905–1963) established the Zadruga magazine in 1937, which gave rise to the movement of Zadrugism; the term zadruga refers to a South Slavic tribal unit. Continuing on from Dołęga-Chodakowski, Stachniuk's own work criticised Catholicism in Poland, arguing that it had had a negative effect on the country's national character. He did not develop his ideas into a religion, and those who shared his views remained "a very loose and diverse intellectual clique". The magazine and its associated group embraced members with a wide variety of viewpoints, ranging from secularly humanistic to religiously Slavic Native Faith stances. He was nevertheless labelled a neopoganin ("Neopagan") by the Polish popular press, a term that he embraced as a self-descriptor in later life. In the same year, Zdzisław Harlender (1898–1939), independently wrote the book Czciciele Dadźbóg Swarożyca ("Worshippers of Dadźbóg Swarożyc"), published in 1937, in which he laid out his vision for the revival of the pre-Christian Slavic religion.

During the war, Stefan Potrzuski led a unit in the Peasant Battalion which battled the Nazi occupation of Poland. His unit had a shrine to the god Svetovid in their secret forest base and held group rites in which they toasted a wooden image of the deity with mead. Also Jan Stachniuk fought against the Nazi occupation during the Warsaw Uprising. Following the end of the war and the incorporation of Poland under the Stalinist regime, both Stachniuk and Kołodziej were arrested, preventing the establishment of a Slavic Native Faith community. In 1954, a student group known as Klan Ausran was established at the University of Łódź; officially dedicated to a study of Indo-European society, its members provided hymns and prayers.

A key influence on the movement was the circulation of the Book of Veles among Russian and Ukrainian emigrees. This text was brought to the public by the Russian Yury Petrovich Mirolyubov (1892–1970), who claimed that it had been discovered by a friend of his, Fodor Arturovich Isenbek, while serving as a White Army officer during the Russian Civil War. Mirolyubov alleged that the Isenbek text had been etched on wooden boards, but that these had been lost during the Second World War, leaving only his own copies. It is probable that the Book of Veles was a literary composition produced by Mirolyubov himself. In following decades the work would have caused a sensation, with many emigrees regarding it as a genuine tenth-century text. Another supporter of the book was the Ukrainian entomologist Sergey Paramonov (also known as Sergey Lesnoy; 1898–1968); he was the one who in 1957 coined the name Book of Veles for the Isenbek text and also named velesovitsa the writing system in which it was allegedly written.

=== 1960s–1980s: Soviet Union and Slavic diaspora in the West ===
One of the disciples of Volodymyr Shaian was Lev Sylenko (1921–2008). He subsequently left Europe and moved first to Canada and then the United States. It was in Chicago that he established the earliest groups of the Native Ukrainian National Faith (Sylenkoism) in 1966. Sylenko presented himself as a prophet of Dazhbog who had been sent to the Ukrainian people. In his view, the Ukrainians were the superior manifestation of the European peoples, and Kiev the oldest city of the white race. Sylenko was a charismatic leader, and his followers praised his talents and oratorial skills. In 1979 he published the Maha Vira ("Great Faith"), a book which he claimed chronicled the ancient history of the Ukrainian people. Sylenkoism was influenced by deism and Theosophy. A Sylenkoite centre, the Temple of Mother Ukraine, was established in Spring Glen, New York. Native Ukrainian National Faith congregations were established among Ukrainian emigree communities in other parts of the United States, Canada, Australia, New Zealand, the United Kingdom, and Germany.

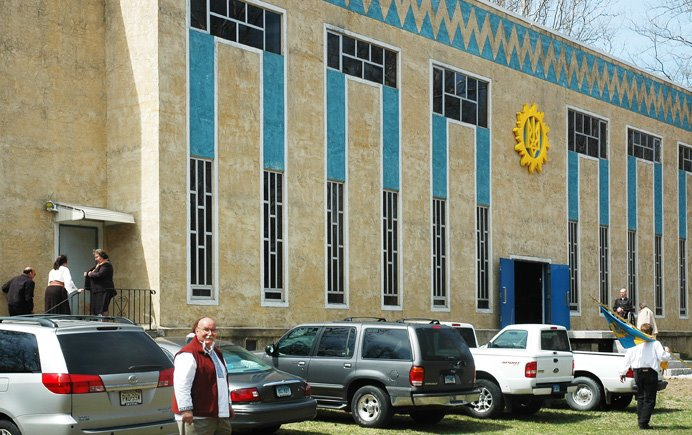
The Temple of Mother Ukraine–Oryana in Spring Glen, New York, United States

During era of Joseph Stalin in the Soviet Union (1920s–1950s), research into prehistoric societies was encouraged, with some scholars arguing that pre-Christian society reflected a form of communitarianism that was damaged by Christianity's promotion of entrenched class divisions. In doing so, pre-Christian belief systems underwent a rehabilitation. Joseph Stalin himself was a supporter of the idea of Slavic Vedism, the shared Indo-European origins of Vedic and Slavic cultures. Boris Rybakov (1908–2001), former head of the Institute of Archaeology, provided the first academic studies about ancient Slavic religion. In the 1960s, the renewal of militant atheism under Nikita Khrushchev also presupposed a recovering of pre-Christian and pre-Islamic traditions.

Russian Rodnovery originated in the Soviet dissident circles in the late 1970s, as intellectuals became concerned for the eradication of traditional Russian culture and identity. The primary neopagan ideologues of the time were the Moscow Arabist Valery Yemelyanov (Velemir) and dissident and neo-Nazi activist Alexey Dobrovolsky (Dobroslav). An intellectual circle that cultivated themes of Slavic indigenous religion formed as a wing of the predominantly Orthodox Christian samizdat nationalist journal Veche (1971–1974). The first manifesto of Russian Rodnovery is considered to be the letter "Critical remarks by a Russian man" (Kriticheskie zametki russkogo cheloveka) published on such journal, anonymously in 1973, by Valery Yemelyanov (1929–1999), who was then close to Khrushchev. The letter criticised Christianity as a product of Judaism serving the interests of Zionism. The journal attracted various personalities, including Anatoly Ivanov, the artist Konstantin Vasilyev (1942–1974), and Nikolay Bogdanov, among others. Vasilyev's art is widely celebrated within the Rodnover community. Ivanov, who declared himself a Zoroastrian and subscribed to "Arism" or "Slavism", published a fervently anti-Christian pamphlet entitled "The Christian Plague" (Khristianskaya chuma). Throughout the 1970s, the nationalist dissident movement split into two branches, an Orthodox Christian one and another one that developed National Bolshevism, which eventually continued to harbour Pagan traditionalists. Other influential texts in this period were Valery Yemelyanov's Dezionization and later Istarkhov's Udar russkikh bogov ("The Strike of Russian Gods").

In the 1970s, explicitly religious Rodnover groups had still to operate in secret, although a few small groups were known to exist in Moscow and Leningrad (Saint Petersburg), closely linked to the nationalist intellectual circles. In Moscow, the occult Yuzhinsky Circle had been established by the poet Yevgeny Golovin, the novelist Yury Mamleyev and the philosopher Vladimir Stepanov in the 1960s, while a young Alexander Dugin would have joined the circle in the 1980s; although not explicitly Pagan, they were influenced by occult Pagan thinkers like Guido von List and sought a return to a pre-Christian Aryan world. In the early 1980s, the Pamyat movement was established by figures active at the Metropolitan Moscow Palace of Culture, whom similarly looked with fondness on ancient Aryan culture. The Pamyat movement attracted personalities interested in Vedism and welcomed the ideas developed among Russian emigrees, also organising a conference on the Book of Veles led by Valery Skurlatov (b. 1938). From 1985 onwards, Pamyat became affiliated with Orthodox Christianity and the Rodnover component eventually left the movement. Vedism was also explicitly espoused within more official Soviet circles; Apollon Kuzmin (1928–2004), leader of the neo-Slavophile historiography, did so in his 1988 book "The Fall of Perun" (Padenie Peruna), in which he supported indigenous Slavic religion while criticising Christianity as the cause of the Mongol yoke (which led to the incorporation of Kievan Rus' in the Golden Horde from 1237 to 1480). In the 1980s, Boris Rybakov published his last books, including The Paganism of the Ancient Slavs (1981) and The Paganism of Ancient Russia (1988). Meanwhile, literary writings of important figures of village prose (derevenshchiki) promoted Paganism, including Petr Proskurin (1928–2001) and Yury Kuznetsov (1941–2003). In 1986, Viktor Bezverkhy (1930–2000) established the Saint Petersburg-based Society of the Mages (Obshchestvo Volkhvov), an explicitly white supremacist and anti-Semitic organisation; it was followed by the Union of the Veneds, founded in 1990. These organisations gave rise to the stream of Rodnovery known as Peterburgian Vedism.

In 1989, Valery Yemelyanov and Alexander Belov founded the Rodnover Moscow Slavic Pagan Community based out of the Slavic-Goritsa Wrestling Club. In 1990, Belov expelled Yemelyanov, Dobrovolsky, and their supporters from the community for political radicalism.

=== 1990s–2000s: Post-Soviet growth ===
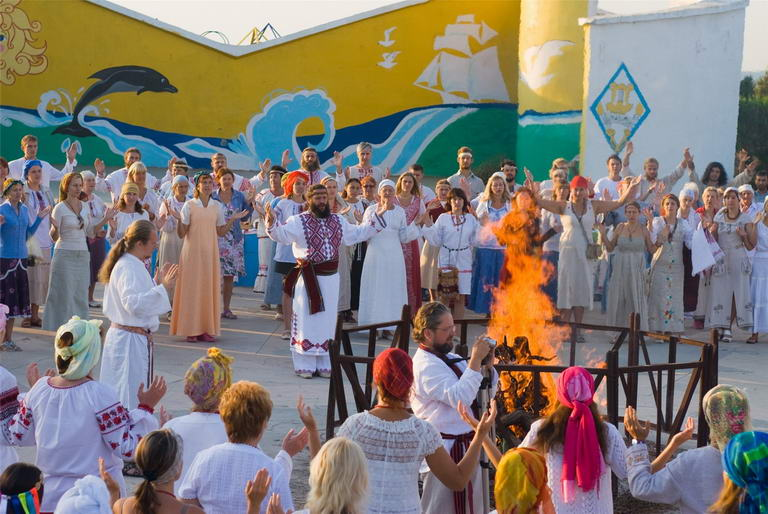
Ukrainian Rodnovers engaged in public worship

After Mikhail Gorbachev's Soviet government introduced the policy of perestroika in the 1980s, Slavic Native Faith groups established themselves in Ukraine. The collapse of the Soviet Union and its official policy of state atheism resulted in a resurgence of open religious adherence across the region. Many individuals arrived at Rodnovery after exploring a range of different alternative spiritualities, with Asian religious influences being particularly apparent within Rodnovery at that time.

After the fall of the Soviet Union, Ukraine became an independent republic, with many Ukrainians turning to strongly nationalistic agendas; among those to have done so are pseudo-archaeologists like Yury Shylov, who posits Ukraine as the "cradle of civilisation". It is within this broader milieu of cultural nationalism and interest in alternative spiritualities that Rodnovery re-emerged in Ukraine. The United States-based Native Ukrainian National Faith established itself in Ukraine soon after independence, with the first congregation in Ukraine gaining official recognition in Kyiv in 1991. There had been schisms in the international organisation of Native Ukrainian National Faith. A number of senior followers broke with Sylenko during the 1980s, rejecting the idea that he should be the ultimate authority in the religion; they formed the Association of Sons and Daughters of the Native Ukrainian National Faith (OSID RUNVira) and secured legal control of the temple in Spring Glen. A second group, the Association of Sons and Daughters of Ukraine of the Native Ukrainian National Faith (OSIDU RUNVira), maintained links with Sylenko himself, whom it regards as a prophet. Despite the animosity that existed between these rival Ukrainian groups, there was some collaboration between them. In 2003, the First Forum of Rodnovers was held in Ukraine, resulting in two public proclamations: the first urged the country's government to protect what the Rodnovers regarded as sacred sites and objects, and the second called on the government not to go ahead with the proposed privatisation of agricultural land. That same year, a group called Ancestral Fire of the Native Orthodox Faith was established; in contrast to the anti-Russian slant taken by Sylenkoism, it embraced a pan-Slavic perspective.

The social context of Rodnovery's growth in Russia differed from that in other parts of Central and Eastern Europe. Russian nationalists had welcomed the collapse of the Soviet system but were disappointed with the arrival of capitalism and the dramatic economic downturn that Russia faced in that decade. Many people became unemployed, and many turned to the past, nourishing the study of ethnic roots. In this context, the growth of Rodnovery can be seen as part of the nationalistic drive to regain national pride. Many leaders of early post-Soviet Rodnovery were intellectuals who were already Rodnovers in the late Soviet times; for instance, Grigory Yakutovsky (volkhv Vseslav Svyatozar), Alexey Dobrovolsky (volkhv Dobroslav) and Viktor Bezverkhy. Other leaders who emerged in this period were Aleksandr Asov, author of numerous books on Rodnover philosophy which have sold millions of copies, Aleksandr Belov, founder of the Slavic-Hill military type of Rodnovery integrating Rodnover philosophy and martial arts, and Viktor Kandyba, founder of Kandybaism.

Literature of a neopagan, racist, antisemitic, and anti-Christian nature is published by the Moscow publishing house Russkaya Pravda, officially registered in 1994, founded by the neopagan publicist Alexander Aratov (Ogneved). The publishing house aims to "publish and distribute literature on Aryan-Slavic-Russian issues." Mainly, it publishes the newspaper Russkaya Pravda. The publishers of Russkaya Pravda advertised Alexey Dobrovolsky (Dobroslav), one of the founders of Russian neopaganism.

In 1997, Valery Yemelyanov, one of the founders of Russian neopaganism, along with a small number of followers, joined Aratov's small movement and became editor-in-chief of the Russkaya Pravda newspaper. Since 1997, the Russkaya Pravda publishing house, represented by Aratov, has formed, together with the Kaluga Slavic community and other groups, the core of the large neopagan association SSO SRV. In the fall of 2001, some former leaders of the People's National Party and Russian National Unity, as well as the editors of the Russkaya Pravda newspaper, united to create the National Power Party of Russia. Historian Victor Schnirelmann characterizes the publishing house and the newspaper Russkaya Pravda as antisemitic.

Since the 1990s, Russian Rodnovery has expanded and diversified. Rodnovers started to establish numerous organised groups by the mid of the decade; in 1994 the Moscow Slavic Community was the first Rodnover group to be registered by the government. Concerted efforts by the communities of Moscow and Kaluga led to the establishment of the Union of Slavic Native Belief Communities in 1997, characterised by nationalist views. In 1999, the communities of Moscow and Obninsk left it as they refuted nationalism, and established another umbrella organisation, the Circle of Veles led by Ilya Cherkasov (volkhv Veleslav), which is one of the largest and administers communities also located in the territory of Ukraine. The Ynglist Church too was formally established in the early 1990s, and it is considered one of the most sectarian and authoritarian denominations of Rodnovery. In 2002, groups of Rodnovers that did not share the extreme right-wing views dominant within some of the largest organisations at the time, promulgated the "Bittsa Appeal", which among other things condemned extreme nationalism and was the foundation charter of another umbrella organisation, the Circle of Pagan Tradition headquartered in Moscow. In 2009, the Union of Slavic Native Belief Communities and the Circle of Pagan Tradition issued a joint statement against Ynglism (Aleksandr Khinevich and Aleksey Trekhlebov), Levashovism (Nikolay Levashov), as well as Valery Chudinov and Gennady Grinevich, disapproving what they reckoned as Ynglists', Levashovites' and the other authors' "pseudo-Pagan teachings, pseudo-linguistics, pseudo-science and outright fiction".

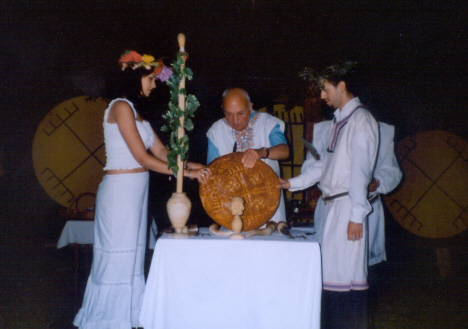
A founder of the Native Polish Church, Lech Emfazy Stefański, holding a wedding ceremony

In Poland, the Wrocław-based publishing house Toporzeł reissued Stachniuk's works and those of his disciple Antoni Wacyk. The 1940s Zadrugist movement inspired the establishment in 1996 of the Association of Native Faith (Zrzeszenie Rodzimej Wiary; now simply called Rodzima Wiara, "Native Faith"), whose founder Stanisław Potrzebowski wrote his doctoral thesis on the pre-war Zadrugism in German. Another Polish Rodnover group under the leadership of Lech Emfazy Stefański registered by the state in 1995 is the Native Polish Church (Rodzimy Kościół Polski), which represents a tradition that goes back to Władysław Kołodziej's Holy Circle of the Worshippers of Svetovid.

Modern Rodnovery in the Czech Republic emerged in 1995–1996. Two groups were founded in those years, the National Front of the Castists (Národní Front Castistů, where "Castists" was created as a neologism from Latin castus, meaning "pure") and the Radhoŝť group, founded by the Naples-born anthropologist and professor of Slavic languages Giuseppe Maiello (whose Slavic name is Dervan) among the students of the Faculty of Philosophy of Charles University in Prague. The two groups, respectively renamed "Kin of Yarovit" and "Kin of Mokosh", merged in 2000 to form the Commonwealth of Native Faith (Společenství Rodná Víra). In 1995, one of the future founders of the organisation, Radek Mikula (Ratko), had established contacts with Vadim Kazakov, leader of the Russian Union of Slavic Native Belief Communities; the relationship continued in the 2000s and led to Rodná Víra becoming an official subgroup of the Russian organisation until 2002, while it nurtured ties with Polish and Slovak Rodnovers too. In the mid-2000s Rodná Víra was legally registered by the Czech government, but internal disagreements culminated with its unregistration in 2010 and transformation into an informal association. Conflicts emerged around the interpretation of ancient Slavic religion: The Kin of Yarovit focused on Indo-European religion and its social trifunctionalism, the Kin of Mokosh focused on Neolithic Europe's mother goddess worship, while groups which emerged later, such as the "Kin of Veles", had no focus.

Rodnovery spread to the countries of former Yugoslavia in the early twenty-first century. A Serbian Native Faith group known as the Slavic Circle (Slovenski Krug) existed during the 1990s and 2000s, merging historical Slavic religion with a ritual structure adopted from the Hermetic Order of the Golden Dawn. In Slovenia, a group called the Svetovid Parish of the Old Belief (Staroverska Župa Svetovid) was established around 2005 through a union of an older group, Ajda, with the followers of the military historian Matjaž Vratislav Anžur. As of 2013, it had between ten and fifteen members. In 2011, the Circle of Svarog (Svaroži Krug) was founded in Bosnia. During the 1990s and 2000s, a number of groups were established in Bulgaria, namely the Dulo Alliance, the Warriors of Tangra, and the Bulgarian Horde 1938. These groups have strong political motivations, being extremely nationalistic, anti-Western, and anti-Semitic. Rodnover personalities and groups played a prominent role in the 2002 establishment of Ongal, a Bulgarian far-right umbrella organisation.

The 1990s and 2000s also witnessed the development of international contacts between Rodnover groups from all Slavic countries, with the organisation of various All-Slavic Rodnover Councils. The Internet helped the spread of Rodnovery and a uniformisation of ritual practices across the various groups. The first Rodnover website on the Russian Internet (so-called Runet)—was created by a Moscow-based believer in 1996. Many Rodnovers made use of Russian Wikipedia to promote their religion, although many switched to LiveJournal and mail.ru, through which they could promulgate their ideas more directly. From the mid-2000s, Rodnovers made increasing use of social media to communicate with other members of their community.

Russian Rodnovery also attracted the attention of Russian academics, many of whom focused on the political dimensions of the movement, thus neglecting other aspects of the community. The scholar Kaarina Aitamurto later criticised some of these Russian-language studies for reflecting scholars' own religious biases against Rodnovery, over-reliance on the published texts of prominent figures, or for sensationalising the subject to shock or impress their audience. This attitude generated some mutual hostility between academics and practitioners of Rodnovery, rendering subsequent scholarly fieldwork more difficult. Rodnover themes entered the heavy metal subculture, particularly in bands like Sokyra Peruna ("Perun's Axe"), Whites Load, and Komu Vnyz ("Who Will Go Down"). In Poland, Rodnovery also influenced various forms of folk and popular music.

=== 2010s: Consolidations and War in Donbas ===
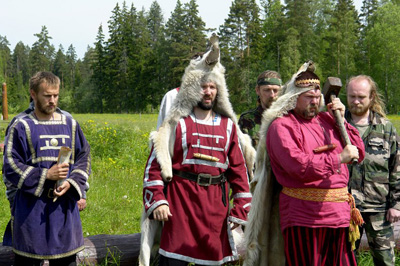
Priests of the Skhoron ezh Sloven Rodnover organisation

The early 2010s saw a strengthening of relations between Rodnover groups. In 2012, in Russia, representatives of the Union of Slavic Native Belief Communities, the Circle of Pagan Tradition and the Circle of Veles, signed an "Agreement on Mutual Recognition of Priests" that defined the criteria for the ordination of those wishing to become Slavic priests. On the same occasion, they once again expressed disapproval for some authors and movements, including the large Skhoron ezh Sloven, which is also present in Belarus and Ukraine. In 2014, the Russian government officially registered the Union of Slavic Native Belief Communities as an interregional public organisation for the promotion of Slavic culture.

Rodnovery has a significant role in the War in Donbas, with many Rodnovers joining pro-Russian armed forces in Donetsk and Luhansk. In 2014 Donetsk People's Republic adopted a "constitution" which stated that the Russian Orthodox Church of the Moscow Patriarchate was the official religion of the self-declared state. This was changed with the promulgation of a law "on freedom of conscience and religious organisation", backed by three deputies professing Rodnovery, whose members organised the pro-Russian Svarozhich Battalion (of the Vostok Brigade) and the Rusich Company.

Donbas has been documented as being a stronghold of Russian Rodnover groups that are reorganising local villages and society according to traditional Indo-European trifunctionalism (according to which males are born to play one out of three roles in society, whether priests, warriors or farmers).

In August 2015, during the 3rd Polish Nationwide Rodnover Congress, the Rodnover Confederation (Konfederacja Rodzimowiercza) was formally established. Among the members are eleven organisations including the Gontyna Association, the Żertwa Association, the Pomeranian Rodnovers (Rodzimowiercy Pomorscy), the Drzewo Przodków Association, the Circle of Radegast (Krąg Radogost), the Kałdus Association, the Swarga Group (Gromada "Swarga"), the WiD Group, ZW Rodzima Wiara and the Watra Rodnover Community (Wspólnota Rodzimowierców "Watra"). In June 2017, during the celebrations of the nationwide holiday called Stado, a new religious organisation was created: the Religious Organisation of Polish Rodnovers "Kin" (Związek Wyznaniowy Rodzimowierców Polskich "Ród").

== Branches, movements and influences ==
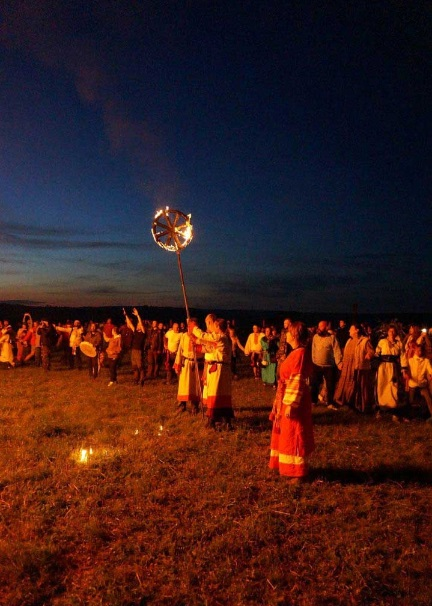
Russian Rodnovers engaged in a ritual with a fiery wheel

There are many denominations of Rodnovery as it is in general a democratic, free, or "open-source religion", that emphasises the "equality of men in their access to the divine" from different perspectives. Eclecticism and syncretism are accepted by most believers, although there is a "minimal framework in which the idea of national [Slavic] tradition dominates". Because of its "open" nature, Rodnovery also hosts in itself denominations which have developed clear doctrines around an authoritarian charismatic leadership. There are often tensions between nondenominational Rodnovers and followers of well-defined doctrines; it is the case of the doctrine of Ynglism, which is not recognised as true Slavic Native Faith by the major Rodnover organisations of Russia, and of Yagnovery, Ladovery and Sylenkoism, which some Rodnovers opine not to be classifiable as branches of Slavic Native Faith. Other Rodnover movements represent distinct ethnic groups within the broader Slavic family or space (Rodnoveries reconstructing the religions of specific early Slavic or Balto-Slavic tribes, Meryan Rodnovery and Scythian Assianism). There are, otherwise, Rodnover groups that intertwine with forms of religion and spirituality which are not immediately related to the Slavic Native Faith (this is the case of Ivanovism, Roerichism and Anastasianism).

Many of these movements share the assumption to represent expressions of "Vedism". Marlène Laruelle found that there are Rodnover movements which draw inspiration from Indo-Iranian sources, historical Vedism, Hinduism, Buddhism and Zoroastrianism; Rodnover movements inspired to the Theosophy of Helena Blavatsky, the Fourth Way of George Gurdjieff and Peter Uspensky, and Roerichism (Nicholas Roerich); Rodnover movements inspired to East Asian religions with their practices of energetic healing and martial arts; Rodnover movements (often the most political ones) inspired to German Ariosophy and the Traditionalist School (studying thinkers such as René Guénon and Julius Evola); Rodnover movements centred on the Russian folk cult of the Mother Earth; and Rodnover movements drawing examples from Siberian shamanism.

=== Ethnic variations of Rodnovery ===
==== Slavic tribal Rodnovery ====
There are branches of Rodnovery striving to reconstruct not a pan-Slavic religion, but the specific religions of the early Balto-Slavic or Slavic tribes. In Belarus and the neighbouring regions of Russia there are groups taking inspiration from the Kriviches, of one of the tribal unions of the early East Slavs, mixing Slavic and Baltic traditions. It is represented by organisations such as the Centre of Ethnocosmology–Kriya (Belarusian: Цэнтр Этнакасмалогіі "Крыўя") by Syargei Sanko and the Tver Ethnocultural Association–Tverzha (Russian: Тверское Этнокультурное Объединение "Твержа") founded in 2010.

Koliada Viatichey (Russian: Коляда Вятичей) is a Rodnover faction that emerged in 1998 through the union of the group named "Viatiches", inspired to the homonymous early East Slavic tribe of the Viatiches, which comprised well-educated Moscow intellectuals and was founded by Nikolay Speransky (volkhv Velimir) in 1995, and the community named "Koliada". Koliada Viatichey refutes any non-Slavic influence in their religion, including the label "Vedic" and Vedic literature, influences from Eastern religions, influences from Roerichism and esotericism, and also the Book of Veles. The movement also rejects extreme right-wing and anti-Semitic ideas. Yet, they espouse Russian nationalism, ancestrality and ecology, and oppose Christianity (but not folk Orthodoxy, which is regarded as a continuation of Russian indigenous religion) and the Western "technocratic civilisation". Koliada Viatichey is theologically dualistic, giving prominence to the complementary principles of Belobog and Chernobog, respectively governing spirit and matter, a polar duality which reflects itself in humanity as the soul and the body. Polytheism is accepted for its ability to "account for the complexity of the world with its multiple good and evil forces", and particularly emphasised is the popular Russian belief in the great goddess of the Earth (Mokosh or Mat Syra Zemlya). Speransky has adopted the concept of Darna from Lithuanian Romuva, explaining it as ordered life "in accordance with the Earth and with the ancestors".

==== Meryan Rodnovery ====
Meryan Rodnovery is a movement present in the Russian regions of Ivanovo, Kostroma, Moscow, Vladimir, Vologda, Tver, and Yaroslavl. It consists in the establishment of an ethnoreligious identity among those Russians who have Meryan ancestry; Merya are Volga Finns fully assimilated by East Slavs in the historical process of formation of the Russian ethnicity. It is primarily an urban phenomenon and its adherents are Russian-speakers.

Various organisations have been established in the late 2000s and 2010s, including Merjamaa and Merya Mir (Меря Мир, "Merya World"). In 2012 they presented their official flag. The scholar Pavel A. Skrylnikov notes that a salient feature of the movement is what he defines "ethnofuturism", that is to say, conscious adaptation of Merya heritage to the forms of modernity, in a process of distinction and interaction with Russian Native Faith. He says that Meryan Native Faith is mostly Slavic Native Faith whose concepts, names and iconography are Finnicised. Meryan Rodnovers also rely upon the uninterrupted traditions of the Mari Native Faith; on 27 September 2015, they organised a joint Mari-Merya prayer in the Moscow region. The cult of a Meryan mother goddess is being built upon the festival of the female saint Paraskevi of Iconium, on November 10. Also, Saint Leontius of Rostov is appropriated as a native god.

==== Scythian Assianism ====
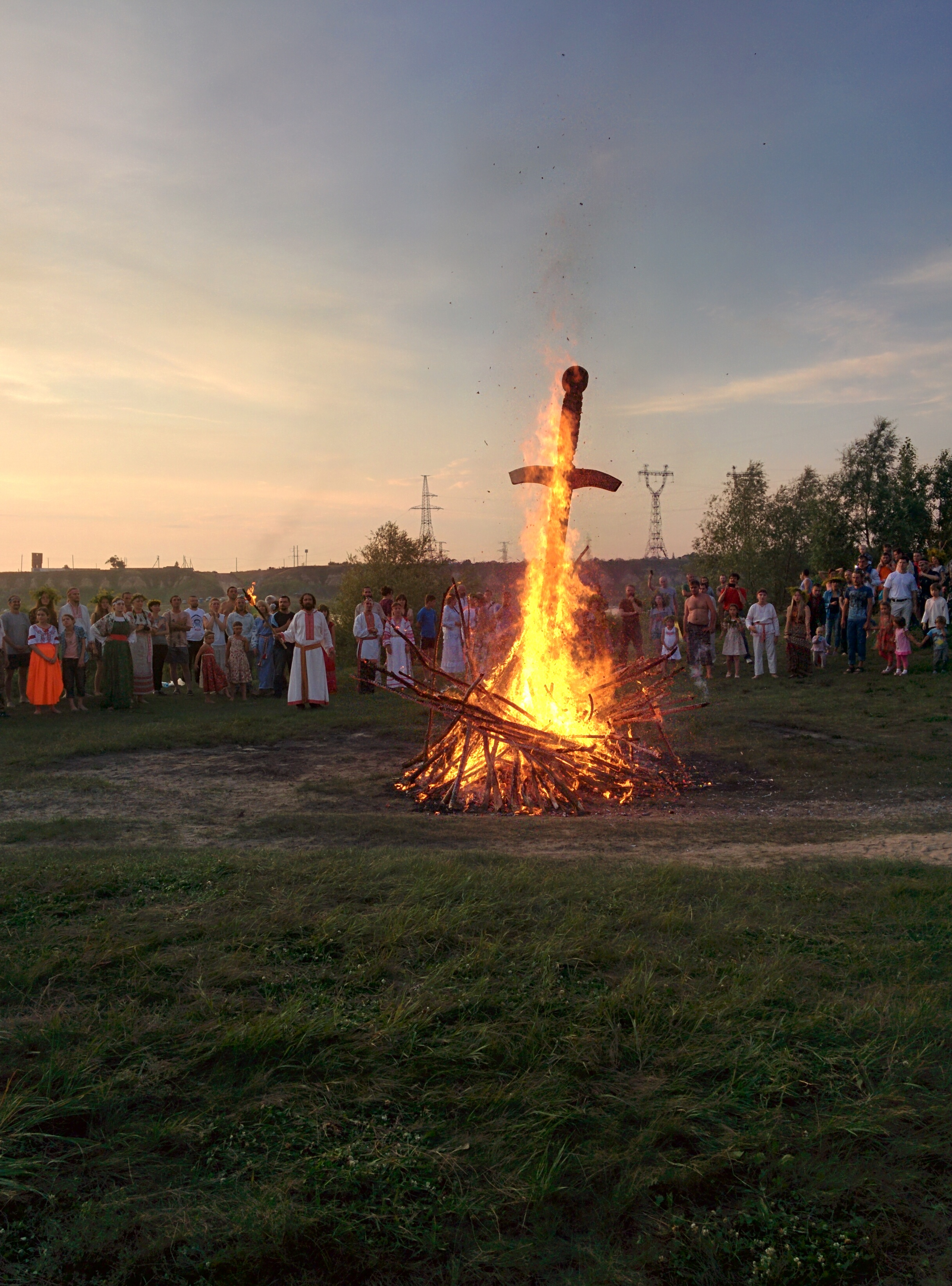
Ritual of the sword planted into a pile of stones or brushwood, to honour the martial deity (Perun), practised by Russian Ynglists in Omsk, Omsk Oblast. It is a Scythian ritual. (Note: The scholar Richard Foltz, in the wake of Scott Littleton and Linda Malcor, traces the origins of the Arthurian legend of the sword in the stone to the Scythian ritual of the sword planted in a pile of stones or bruswood to worship the martial deity, likely brought to Britain by Alan (Sarmatian) regiments settled there by the Romans in the first century CE.)

Scythian Assianism (Russian: Скифское Ассианство) is essentially a type of Scythian Rodnovery which emulates the Ossetian Folk Religion. It is present in Russia and Ukraine, especially, but not exclusively, among Cossacks who claim a Scythian identity to distinguish themselves from Slavs. An organised attempt at a renewal of the Scythian religion by the Cossacks started in the 1980s building upon the folk religion of the Ossetians, who are the modern descendants of the Alans. The Ossetians endonymously call the religion Watsdin (Ossetian Cyrillic: Уацдин, literally "True Faith"), and practice it in large numbers. The North Caucasian Scythian Regional Fire is a Scythian Rodnover organisation in the North Caucasus region of Russia and eastern Ukraine that operates under the aegis of the Ancestral Fire of the Native Orthodox Faith. Another organisation is the "All-Russian Movement of the Scythians".

There are various Watsdin organisations in North Ossetia–Alania affiliated with Scythian Assianism, including the Atsætæ organisation led by Daurbek Makeyev. Some Russians have embraced Watsdin by virtue of the fact that most of the ancient Scythians were assimilated by the East Slavs, and therefore many Russians wish to reclaim Scythian culture by naturalizing into the Ossetian religion. Such idea that Russians may derive, at least in part, from Scythians is popular in many Rodnover circles. Makeyev himself, in a 2007 publication entitled "Assianism and world culture" (Assianstvo i mirovaya kul'tura), presented the religion as a worldwide spiritual heritage. In 2009, on the occasion of a conference specifically dedicated to the subject held at the Moscow State University, the philosopher Alexander Dugin praised the renewal of Scythian culture as an inspiration that will be beneficial to all descendants of Indo-European peoples and to the whole world.

==== Ukrainian Rodnovery ====
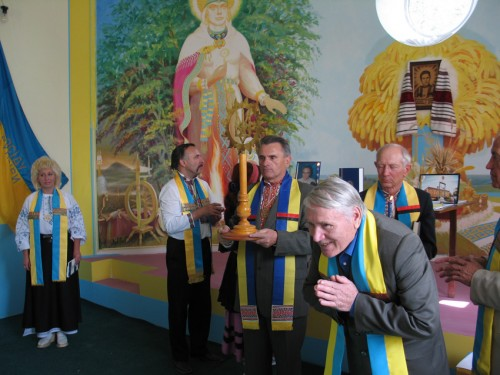
Sylenkoite clergy at the Temple of the Nativity of Lev Sylenko, of OSIDU RUNVira, located where Sylenko was born, in Bohoyavlensky, Mykolaiv, Ukraine

In Ukraine, there are currents of Rodnovery which are peculiar to the Ukrainians. Sylenkoism is the branch of Rodnovery represented by the churches of the Native Ukrainian National Faith (Ukrainian: Рі́дна Украї́нська Націона́льна Ві́ра) founded by Lev Sylenko in 1966 among the Ukrainian diaspora in the United States, and introduced in Ukraine only in 1991 after the fall of the Soviet Union. Sylenko was originally a disciple of Volodymyr Shaian, but by the 1970s the two had taken different paths, as Sylenko had begun to elaborate his own reformed systematic doctrine, codified in the holy book titled Maha Vira ("Great Faith"). Today, there are at least four Sylenkoite churches: the Association of Sons and Daughters of Ukraine of the Native Ukrainian National Faith (OSIDU RUNVira), the Association of Sons and Daughters of the Native Ukrainian National Faith (OSID RUNVira), Volodymyr Chornyi's western branch of OSIDU RUNVira centred in Lviv, and the more independent Union of the Native Ukrainian Faith (SRUV). According to the definition of Sylenko himself, Sylenkoite theology is a solar "absolute monotheism", in which the single God is identified as Dazhbog.

Sylenko proclaimed himself a prophet, bringing to the Slavs a new understanding of God that, according to him, corresponds to their own and original understanding of God. According to his followers, he acquired such knowledge through the "breath of his ancestors" being united with them "by divine holiness". Halyna Lozko of the Federation of Ukrainian Rodnovers, which directly inherits Volodymyr Shaian's orthodox doctrine, advanced vehement critiques of Sylenkoism, deeming Lev Sylenko a "false prophet" and accusing him of having tried to lead Ukrainians in the Abrahamic religions' "quagmire of cosmopolitan monotheism".

Yagnovery (Ukrainian: Ягновіра), Ladovery (Ладовіра), and Orantism (Орантизм) are other branches of Rodnovery that have their focus in Ukraine. Ladovery is a doctrine articulated by Oleksander Shokalo and other personalities in the magazine Ukraïns'kyi Svit ("Ukrainian World"). Orantism is a movement centred around the cult of Berehynia, linked to Ukrainian national identity, non-violence and resistance to global assimilation.

=== Movements often classified as "Vedism" ===
==== Peterburgian Vedism ====
Peterburgian or Russian Vedism (Russian: Петербургский/Русский Ведизм) is one of the earliest Rodnover movements started by the philosopher Viktor Bezverkhy in Saint Petersburg, between the late 1980s and early 1990s, and primarily represented by the Society of the Mages (Общество Волхвов) founded in 1986 and the Union of the Veneds (Союз Венедов) established in 1990, and their various offshoots, including Skhoron ezh Sloven (Схорон еж Словен), established in 1991 by Vladimir Y. Golyakov, which has branches across Russia, and in Belarus and Ukraine. The use of the term "Vedism" to refer to Slavic religion goes back to Yury Mirolyubov, the writer or discoverer of the Book of Veles.

==== Ringing Cedars' Anastasianism ====
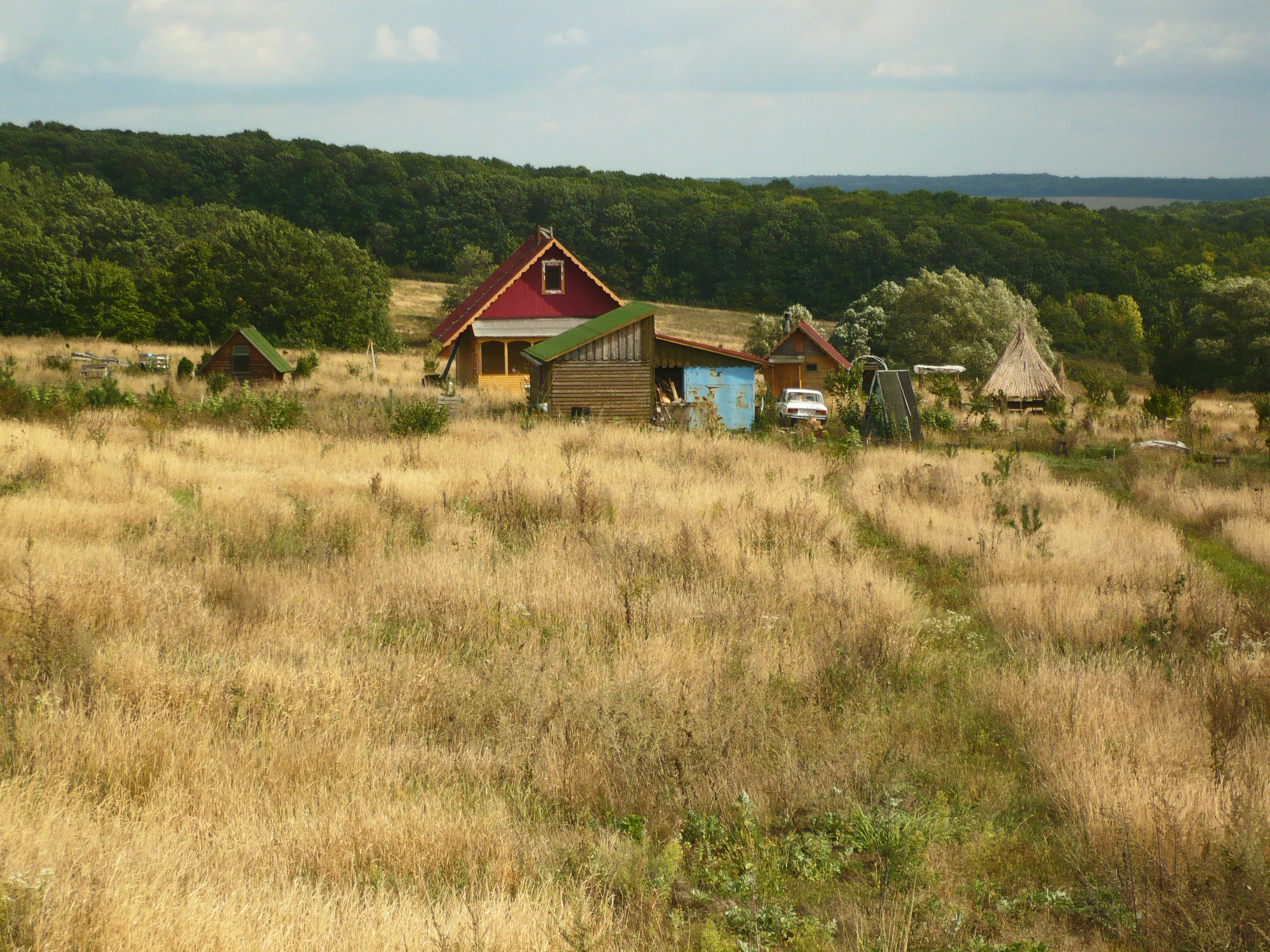
Buildings and fields in Korenskiye Rodniki ("Root Springs"), an Anastasian village in the Shebekinsky District of Belgorod Oblast, Russia

Anastasianism (Russian: Анастасианство, Анастасийство, Анастасиизм) or the Ringing Cedars (Звенящие Кедры) is a spiritual movement that overlaps with Rodnovery. The Anastasian movement arose starting in 1997 from the writings of Vladimir Megre (Puzakov; born 1950), codified in a series of ten books entitled The Ringing Cedars of Russia, whose teachings are attributed to a beautiful Siberian woman known as Anastasia, often considered a deity or the incarnation of a deity, whom Megre would have met during one of his trade expeditions. These books teach what the scholar Rasa Pranskevičiūtė has defined as a "cosmological pantheism", in which nature is the manifested "thought of God" and human intelligence has the power to commune with him and to actively participate to the creation of the world.

Anastasians have established networks of ecovillages throughout Russia and in other countries. Their settlements are known as "kinship homesteads" (родовое поместье, rodovoye pomest'ye), and are usually grouped in broader "ancestral villages" (родовое поселение, rodovoye poseleniye), where an extended family, a kin, may conduct a harmonious autonomous life in at least one hectare of land of their property. The name "Ringing Cedars" derives from the beliefs held by Anastasians about the spiritual qualities of the Siberian cedar. In his writings, Megre identifies the ideal society which the Anastasians aim at establishing, based on its spiritual ideas, as an ancient Slavic and Russian "Vedism" and "Paganism", and many of his teachings are identical to those of other movements of Rodnovery.

==== Roerichism, Bazhovism, and Ivanovism ====
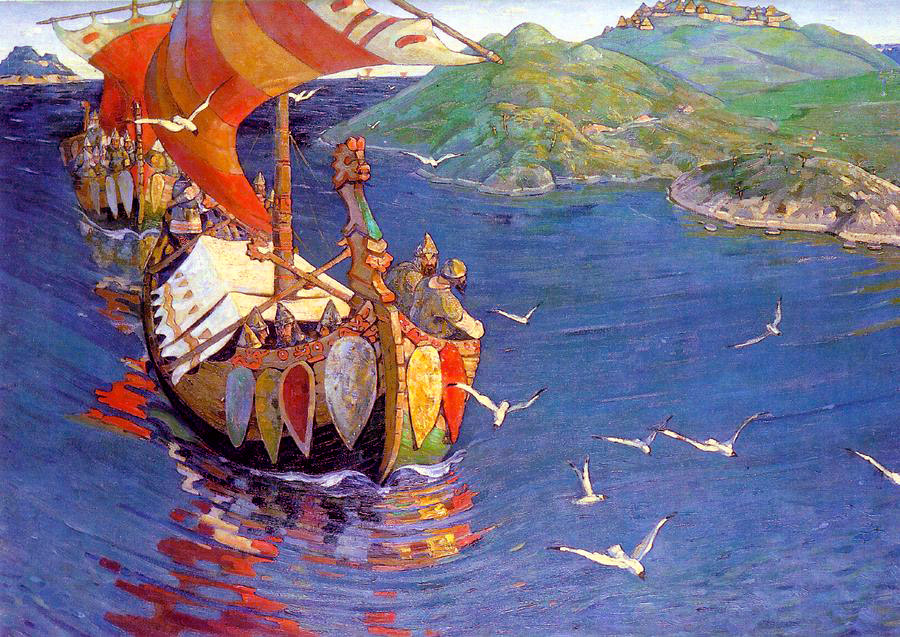
Guests from Overseas—Nicholas Roerich, 1901. The painting represents the coming of Varangian Rus' from Scandinavia to the heart of the Eurasian continent.

Roerichism (Russian: Рерихиа́нство, Рерихи́зм) and Ivanovism (Ивановизм) are spiritual movements linked with Russian cosmism, a holistic philosophy emphasising the centrality of the human being within a living environment, in turn related to the God-Building movement. It originated in the early twentieth century and experienced a revival after the collapse of the Soviet Union, relying upon the Russian philosophical tradition, especially that represented by Vladimir Vernadsky and Pavel Florensky.

The Roerichian movement originated from the teachings of Helena and Nicholas Roerich, it inherits elements of Theosophy, and revolves around the practice of Agni Yoga, the union with Agni, the fire enliving the universe. Ivakhiv classifies Roerichians and others movements of Theosophical imprint, such as the Ukrainian Spiritual Republic founded by Oles Berdnyk, together within the broader "Vedic" movement.

Ivanovism is a spiritual discipline based on the teachings of the mystic Porfiry Ivanov, based on the Detka healing system and religious hymns. The movement has its headquarters in eastern Ukraine, the region of origin of Ivanov himself, and it is widespread in Russia. Ivanovite teachings are incorporated by Peterburgian Vedism. Schnirelmann reported in 2008 that Ivanovism was estimated to have "a few dozen thousand followers".

Bazhovism (Бажовство) originated as a branch of the Roerichian movement and is centred in the Ural region of Russia, where Arkaim, in Chelyabinsk Oblast, is regarded by the Bazhovites as the world's spiritual centre. The Bazhovites retain most of the Roerichian practices, and worship, as their major deities, the Mistress of the Copper Mountain and the Great Snake.

==== Authentism, Kandybaism, Levashovism, and the Way of Troyan ====
Authentism (Russian: Аутентизм), incorporated as the Tezaurus Spiritual Union (Духовный Союз "Тезаурус"), is a Rodnover spiritual philosophy and psychological order created by the psychologist Sergey Petrovich Semenov in 1984, in Saint Petersburg. The movement is based on the teachings of the Russian Veda, considered an expression of Slavic paganism, Russian cosmism and psychoanalysis. The aim of the Authentist philosophical practice is to reveal one's own true spiritual essence, which is identical with God, Rod—which is viewed as the complementary unity of Belobog/Sventovid and Chernobog/Veles—and therefore the unity of mankind and God, which characterises Russia's special mission opposed to Western individualism.

The Way of Troyan (Тропа Троянова, Tropa Troyanova; where "Troyan" is another name of the god Triglav, regarded as the patron god of Russia), incorporated as the Academy of Self-Knowledge (Академия Самопознания) and the All-Russian Association of Russian Folk Culture (Всероссийское Общество Русской Народной Культуры), is a Rodnover psychological movement founded in 1991 by the historian and psychologist Aleksey Andreev (pseudonym of Aleksandr Shevtsov) relying upon a thorough ethnographic fieldwork, especially focused on the Ofeni tribe of Vladimir Oblast. Tropa Troyanova does not identify itself as a "religion", but rather as a "traditional worldview". The movement promotes traditional Russian healing methods, psychoanalysis and martial arts.

==== Ynglism ====
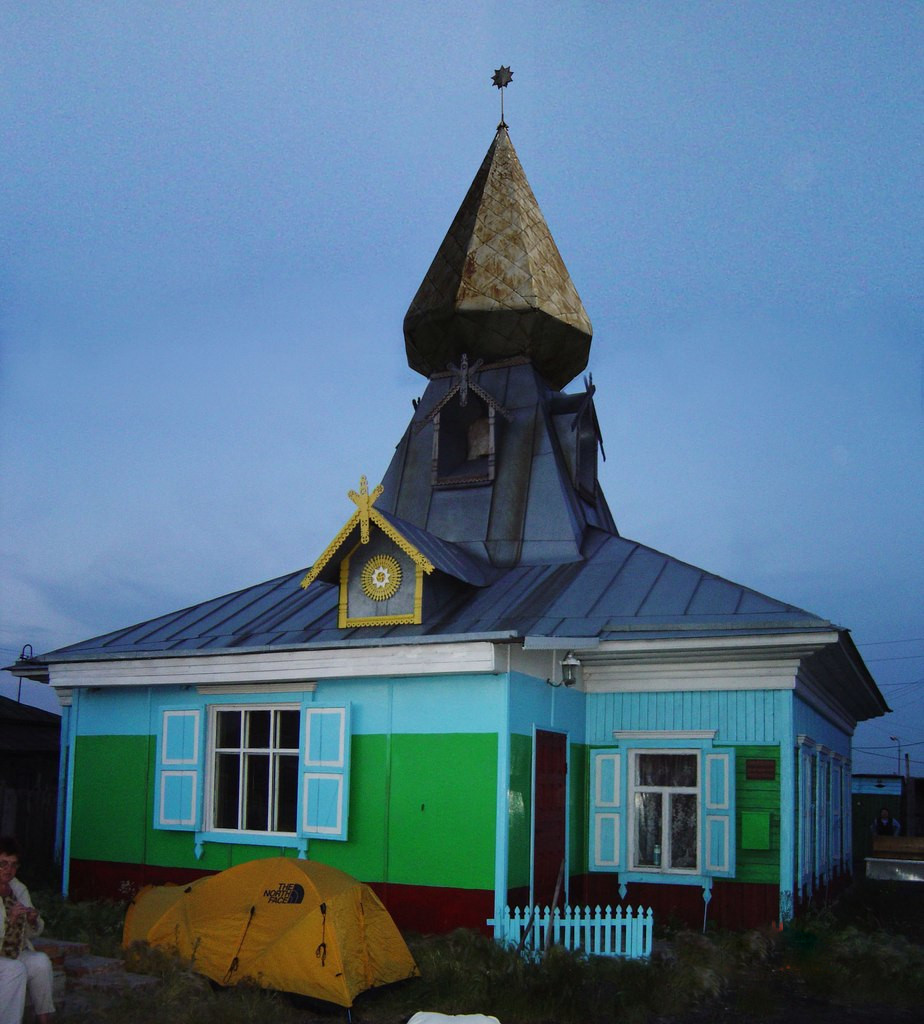
The Temple of the Wisdom of Perun, part of the headquarters of the Ynglist Church in Omsk, in 2004

Ynglism (Russian: Инглии́зм), institutionally known as the Ancient Russian Ynglist Church of the Orthodox Old Believers–Ynglings, was established in the early 1990s by the charismatic leader Aleksandr Khinevich from Omsk, in Siberia. According to the movement, which presents itself as the true, orthodox, olden religion of the Russians, the Slavs and the white Europeans, Yngly is the fiery order of reality through which the supreme God—called by the name "Ramha" in Ynglist theology—ongoingly generates the universe. They believe that "Yngling", a name that identifies the earliest royal kins of Scandinavia, means "offspring of Yngly", and that the historical Ynglings migrated to Scandinavia from the region of Omsk, which they claim was a spiritual centre of the early Indo-Europeans. They hold that the Saga ob Ynglingakh, their Russian version of the Germanic Ynglinga saga (itself composed by Snorri Sturluson on the basis of an older Ynglingatal), proves their ideas about the origins of the Ynglings in Omsk, and that the Germanic Eddas are ultimately a more recent, western European and Latinised version of their own sacred books, the Slavo-Aryan Vedas.

Besides their Vedas, the Ynglists instruct their disciples about "Aryan mathematics" and grammar, and techniques for a "healthy way of life", including forms of eugenics. The Church is known for its intensive proselytism, carried out through a "massive selling" of books, journals and other media. Ynglists organise yearly gatherings (veche) in summer.

The Ynglist Church was prosecuted in the early 2000s for ethnic hatred according to Russian laws, and its headquarters in Omsk were dissolved. Despite this, Ynglism continues to operate as an unregistered religious phenomenon represented by a multiplicity of communities. Ynglism meets widespread disapproval within mainstream Rodnovery, and an international veche of important Rodnover organisations has declared it a false religion. Nevertheless, according to Aitamurto, on the basis of the amount of literature that Ynglists publish and the presence of their representatives at various Rodnover conferences, is clear that Ynglism has a "substantial number of followers". The scholar Elena Golovneva described Ynglist ideas as "far from being marginal" within Russian Rodnovery.

=== Siberian shamanic and Tengrist Rodnovery ===
Many Rodnovers are influenced by Siberian shamanism, which has become widespread in easternmost regions of Russia, as well as Tengrism. One of the earliest exponents of Russian Rodnovery, Moscow State University-graduated psychologist Grigory Yakutovsky (1955–, known as a shaman by the name Vseslav Svyatozar), asserted that ancient Slavic religion was fundamentally shamanic, and Siberian shamanism plays a central role in his doctrines. In Yakutovsky's Rodnovery, male gods are secondary in importance compared to goddesses, and he claims that this was typical of ancient Slavic religion, which according to him was matriarchal. Yakutovsky's form of Rodnovery has been defined as tolerant, pluralistic and pacifistic, and his teachings are popular among Rodnovers who identify as communists. Yakutovsky is critical of the Soviet type of communism, and rather proposes "social communism" as the ideal form of government. He also espouses a form of elitism, by recognising shamans (poets and mystics) as people characterised by greater intelligence and power devoted to the realisation of a better future for mankind. Tengrist-influenced Rodnovery is practised by Bulgarian groups who identify as descendants of the ancient Turkic Bulgars.

=== Slavic-Hill Rodnovery ===
Slavic-Hill Rodnovery (Russian: Славяно-Горицкое Родноверие) is one of the earliest branches of the Slavic Native Faith that emerged in Russia in the 1980s, and one of the largest in terms of number of practitioners, counted in the many tens of thousands. The movement is characterised by a military orientation, combining Rodnover worldview with the practice of a martial arts style known as Slavic-hill wrestling (Славяно-горицкая борьба, Slavyano-goritskaya bor'ba). The locution "Slavic hill" refers to the kurgan, warrior mound burials of the Pontic–Caspian steppe.

The founder Aleksandr Belov (Selidor) was originally a Karate master, and in the 1970s and 1980s he began researching and reviving ancient Slavic martial techniques mixing them with elements of English catch wrestling and other styles, codifying the practice in the book Slavic-Hill Wrestling and popularising it by founding, in 1986, the group of the Descendants of Svarog (Сварожичей-Триверов, Svarozhychey-Tryverov), which in 1989 took part in the creation of the Moscow Slavic Pagan Community; in 1995 Belov left the group and the following year he established the Russian Federation of Slavic-Hill Wrestling, which was officially registered by the state in 2015 as the Association of Slavic-Hill Wrestling Fighters (Ассоциация Бойцов Славяно-Горицкой Борьбы). The original federation of Belov splintered many times over the years giving rise to other distinct groups of military Rodnovery; Belov, however, continued to remain a central figure for the movement as a whole. Outside of Russia, the movement has communities in Belarus, Bulgaria and Ukraine, and as a sport it is practised in other countries too. Together with a narrow circle of believers, Belov also experiments with an "inner energy" style of fighting based on folk magic.

Rather than as a "religion", Belov characterises the movement as a man's "assimilation to the law of the universe", expressed in images and worship practices. The theology of Slavic-Hill Rodnovery is pantheistic and polytheistic, and the movement's military orientation is reflected in its pantheon, which gives prominence to military deities headed by Perun, identified as the ruler of the universe. Ritual is extremely simplified and the god of warriors, the thunderer, is worshipped through war totems (falcon, kite, bear, wolf and lynx). The adherents believe that the class of the warriors should have the superior and leading role in society (espousing the idea of a military state and rejecting communism and democracy), and should be always ready to sacrifice themselves for the community. The movement abhors moral decay, while emphasising discipline and conservative values, and even though Belov's early works do not have a radical right-wing posture, many adherents espouse such position.

=== Way of Great Perfection ===
The Way of Great Perfection (Russian: Путь Великого Совершенства) is an esoteric doctrine of Rodnovery elaborated by Ilya Cherkasov (volkhv Veleslav), offering a perspective which according to him never existed in Slavic religion, a Slavic left-hand path. The Way of Great Perfection is actually conceptualised as an overcoming of both the right-hand and the left-hand paths. He borrows from various Eastern traditions, including Hinduism (Tantrism), Buddhism and Taoism, but also Western Neoplatonism, Hermeticism and alchemy, as well as the medieval German mysticism of the Friends of God (Meister Eckhart and Johannes Tauler). The goal of this esoteric system goes beyond that of other left-hand path traditions which stop at the deification of the individual; the goal of Veleslav's way is to strip the individual of any identity constructions through images and dreams of death and destruction, to reveal the individual's true essence, ultimately sacrifying its individual divinity, its names and forms, into the utmost spring of all divinity, the transcendent, primordial, unborn, unthinkable supreme source. Veleslav's left-hand path has been criticised by other Rodnover groups and leaders including Speransky and Irina Volkova (Krada Veles).

=== Politicised current ===
According to Laruelle, the most politicised current of Rodnovery has given rise to organisations in Russia including the Church of the Nav (Це́рковь На́ви), founded by Ilya Lazarenko and inspired by German Ariosophy; the Dead Water movement and its parties which participated to the State Duma elections in 2003; Aleksandr Sevastianov's National Party of the Russian Great Power, which has had links with politicians close to the former mayor of Moscow Yury Luzhkov (1936–2019); and the Party of Aryan Socialism led by Vladimir Danilov. The ideas of these Rodnover political groups span from extreme right-wing nationalism and racism, to Stalinism, seen by some of them as the most successful political expression of Paganism.

== Demographics ==
=== Eastern Slavic nations ===
==== Russia ====
Writing in 2000, Schnirelmann noted that Rodnovery was growing rapidly within the Russian Federation. In 2003, the Russian Ministry of Justice had forty registered Rodnover organisations, while there were "probably several hundred of them in existence". In 2016, Aitamurto noted that there was no reliable information on the number of Rodnovers in Russia, but that it was plausible that there were several tens of thousands of practitioners active in the country. This was partly because there were several Rodnover groups active on the social network VK which had over 10,000 members. The 2012 Sreda Arena Atlas complement to the 2010 census of Russia, found 1.7 million people (1.2% of the total population of the country) identifying themselves as "Pagans" or followers of "traditional religions, worship of gods and ancestors". In 2019, Anna A. Konopleva and Igor O. Kakhuta stated that "the popularity of Neopaganism in Russia is obvious".

Aitamurto observed that a substantial number of adherents—and in particular those who had been among the earliest—belonged to the "technical intelligentsia". Similarly, Schnirelmann noted that the founders of Russian Rodnovery were "well-educated urbanised intellectuals" who had become frustrated with "cosmopolitan urban culture". Physicists were particularly well represented; in this Aitamurto drew comparisons to the high number of computer professionals who were present in the Pagan communities of Western countries. The movement also involved a significant number of people who had a background in the Soviet or Russian Army, or in policing and security. The vast majority of Russian Rodnovers were young and there were a greater proportion of men than women. A questionnaire distributed at the Kupala festival in Maloyaroslavets suggested that Rodnovers typically had above-average levels of education, with a substantial portion working as business owners or managers. A high proportion were also involved in specialist professions such as engineering, academia, or information technology, and the majority lived in cities.

Marlène Laruelle similarly noted that Rodnovery in Russia has spread mostly among the young people and the cultivated middle classes, that portion of Russian society interested in the post-Soviet revival of faith but turned off by Orthodox Christianity, "which is very institutionalized" and "out of tune with the modern world", and "is not appealing [to these people] because it expects its faithful to comply with normative beliefs without room for interpretation". Rodnovery is attractive because of its "paradoxical conjunction" of tradition and modernity, recovery of the past through innovative syntheses, and its values calling for a rediscovery of the true relationship between mankind, nature and the ancestors. Rodnovery has also contributed to the diffusion of "historical themes"—particularly regarding an ancient Aryan race—to the general population, including many who were Orthodox or non-religious.

Some strains of Rodnovery have become close supporters and components of Eurasianism, the dominant ideology of the Russian central state under Vladimir Putin, whose most prominent contemporary theorist is the philosopher Alexander Dugin. A number of youth subcultures have been identified as introducing people to Rodnovery, among them heavy metal, historical re-enactment, and the admirers of J. R. R. Tolkien. Rodnovery is also spread through a variety of newspapers and journals. Also popular with Russian Rodnovers has been the martial arts movement of Slavyano-goritskaya bor'ba. A number of popular celebrities, including the singer Maria Arkhipova, the professional boxer Aleksandr Povetkin, and the comedian Mikhail Nikolayevich Zadornov (1948–2017), have publicly embraced Rodnovery.

==== Ukraine ====
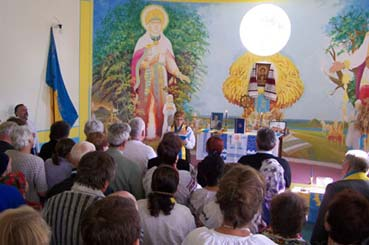
Ukrainians worshipping at the Temple of the Nativity of Lev Sylenko in Bohoyavlensky, Mykolaiv, Ukraine

Slavic Native Faith underwent dramatic growth in Ukraine during the early and mid 1990s. In 2005, Ivakhiv noted that there were likely between 5000 and 10,000 practitioners in Ukraine. Three years later he reported sociological researches suggesting Ukrainian Rodnovers to be 90,000 or 0.2% of the population. The religion's "main base" consisted of ethnic Ukrainians who were "nationally oriented" and who displayed higher than average levels of education. There is overlap between Slavic Native Faith followers and other sectors of Ukrainian society, such as the folk and traditional music revival groups, Cossack associations, traditional martial arts groups, and nationalist and ultra-nationalist organisations.

Ivakhiv noted that Rodnovery remains "a relatively small niche in Ukrainian religious culture", and that it faces a mixed reception in the country. Established Ukrainian Orthodox and Roman Catholic groups have viewed it with alarm and hostility, while the country's educated and intellectual classes tend to view it as a fringe part of the ultra-conservative movement which was tinged with anti-Semitism and xenophobia.

In the global Ukrainian diaspora, there has been a "great decline" in the numbers practising the Native Ukrainian National Faith branch of Rodnovery. This has been due to this branch's inability to attract sufficient numbers of youth in this community. Alternately, the Ukrainian organisation Ancestral Fire of the Native Orthodox Faith has expanded in both Moldova and Germany.

==== Belarus ====
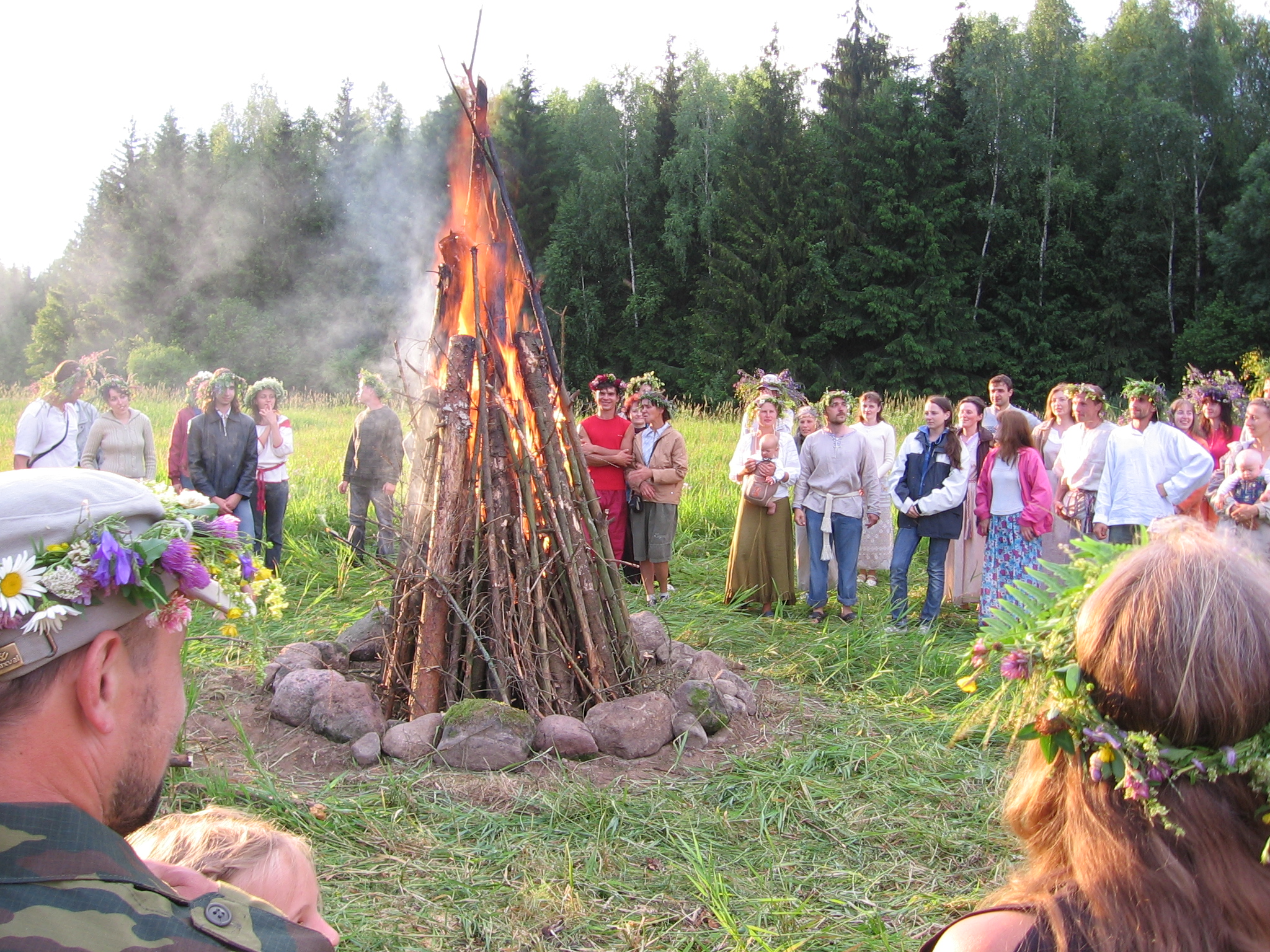
Fire ritual of Belarusian Rodnovers

Rodnover groups are also active in Belarus, though the movement emerged in the country only in the 1990s, much later than in Russia and Ukraine. In 2015, the movement was observed to be small but well connected with romantic intellectuals and nationalist political circles, and with the debate about the ethnic identity of the Belarusians. It is popular among some intellectuals of the pro-Russian cultural factions (for instance, Uladzimir Sacevič), that is to say those who consider the Belarusians as a branch of the Russians, while other Rodnovers are pan-Slavist, considering the Belarusians a branch of the Slavs on par with the Russians. There are groups which focus on the traditions of the Kriviches, an early East Slavic tribe, and mix Slavic and Baltic practices. Other groups consider the Belarusians to be Slavicised Balts, especially related to the Old Prussians, and have elaborated a religion leaning towards the Baltic Native Faith, called Druva, whose spiritual centre should be established in the Chernyakhovsky District of Kaliningrad Oblast, in Russia, where the ancient Romuva sanctuary of the Prussians was located. The political scientist O. Kravtsov has called for making Druva the national religion of Belarus. The largest organisations are the Commonwealth of Rodoviches, which represents Rodnovers fully aligned with Slavic traditions, and the groups Radzimas and Centre of Ethnocosmology–Kriya, which represents Krivich Rodnovery. The worship of Svyatogor is central to the religion of many Belarusian Rodnovers.

=== Southern Slavic nations ===
As of 2013, Rodnover groups in Bulgaria were described as having few members and little influence. Some Bulgarian Rodnovers identify themselves as the descendants of the Turkic Bulgars and therefore lean towards the Central Asian shamanic type of Rodnovery, influenced by the ancient Turko-Mongolian religion; they are incorporated as the Tangra Warriors Movement (Bulgarian: Движение "Воини на Тангра"). In Serbia, there is the Association of Rodnovers of Serbia "Staroslavci" (Serbo-Croatian: Удружење родноверних Србије "Старославци", Udruženje rodnovernih Srbije "Staroslavci"). In Bosnia and Herzegovina there is a Slavic Native Faith group called Circle of Svarog (Svaroži Krug), founded in 2011. The group is associated with the movement of Praskozorje.

=== Western Slavic nations ===
==== Poland ====
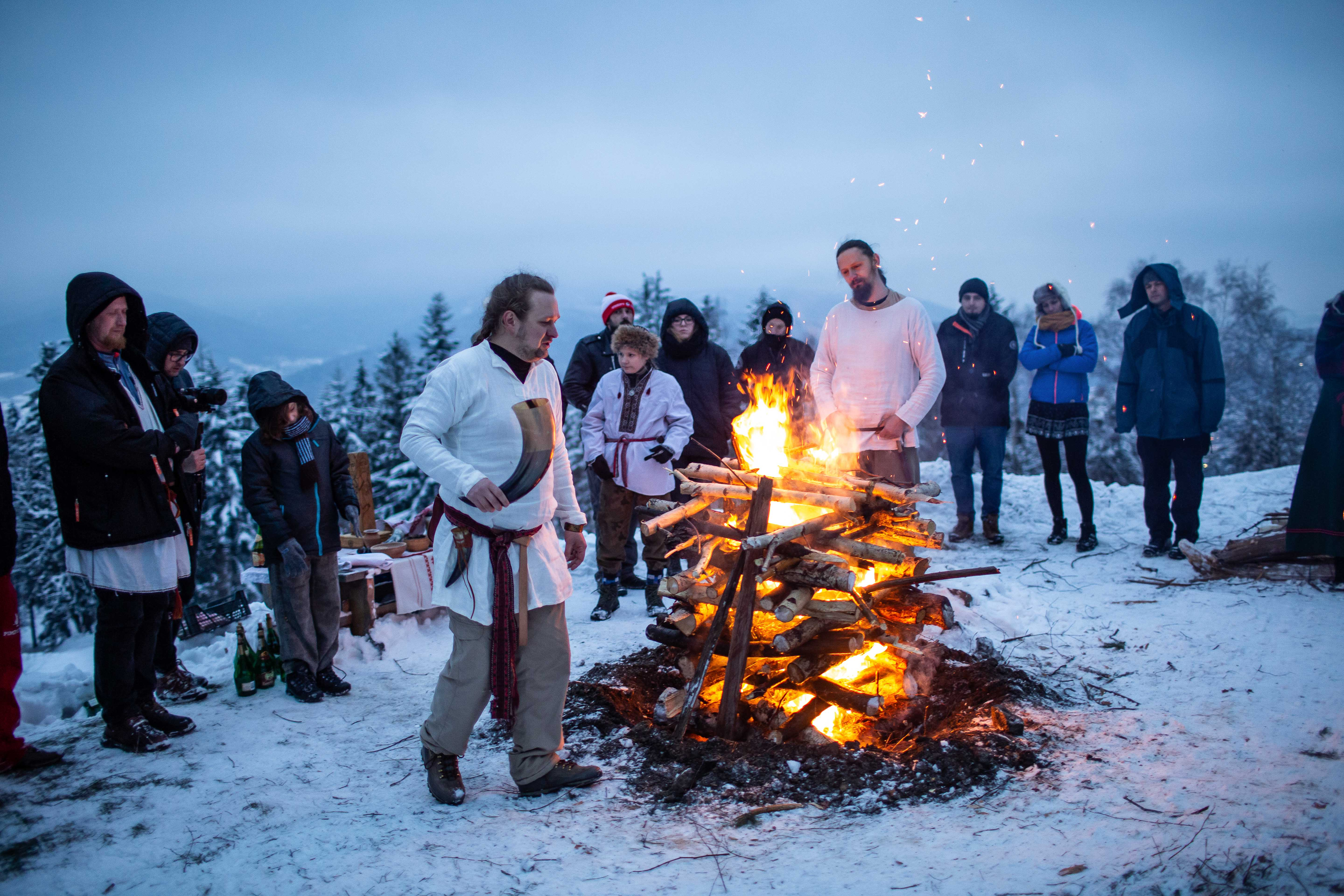
Group of Polish Rodnovers celebrating a ritual in winter

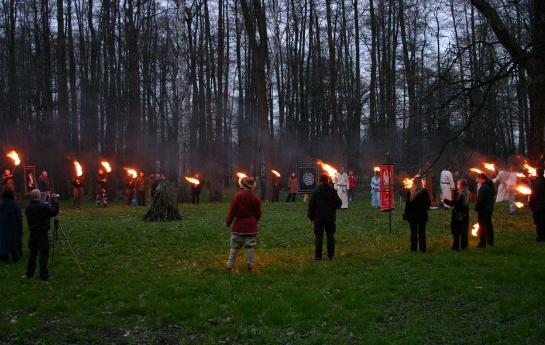
Polish Rodnovers worshipping in the woods

In 2013, Simpson noted that Slavic Native Faith remains a "very small religion" in Poland, which is otherwise dominated by Roman Catholicism. He reported that there were under 900 regularly active members of the main four registered Polish Native Faith organisations, and around as many adherents belonging to smaller, unregistered groups. In 2017, he stated that between 2000 and 2500 "actively engaged and regular participants" were likely active in the country. In 2020, Konrad Kośnik and Elżbieta Hornowska estimated between 7000 and 10,000 Polish Rodnovers. Simpson observed that in the country, Rodnovers were "still relatively young", and saw an overlap with the community of historical re-enactors. Kosnik and Hornowska observed that despite being young, Polish Rodnovers were spiritually mature and had joined the religion as it satisfied deep personal needs. They also observed that males constituted the majority of the community. In Poland, the Slavic Native Faith outnumbers other Pagan religions, although both are represented in the Pagan Federation International's Polish branch.

==== Czech Republic ====
The scholar Anna-Marie Dostálová documented in 2013 that the entire Pagan community in the Czech Republic, including Slavic Rodnovers as well as other Pagan religions, was small. The first Pagan groups to emerge in the Czech Republic in the 1990s were oriented towards Germanic Heathenry and Celtic Druidry, while modern Slavic Rodnovery began to develop around 1995–1996 with the foundation of two groups, the National Front of the Castists and Radhoŝť, which in 2000 were merged to form the Commonwealth of Native Faith (Společenství Rodná Víra). This organisation was a government-recognised entity until 2010, when it was unregistered and became an informal association due to disagreements between the Castists and other subgroups about whether Slavic religion was Indo-European hierarchic worship (supported by the Castists), Neolithic mother goddess worship, or neither.

The leader since 2007 is Richard Bigl (Khotebud), and the organisation is today devoted to the celebration of annual holidays and individual rites of passage, to the restoration of sacred sites associated with Slavic deities, and to the dissemination of knowledge about Slavic spirituality in Czech society. While the contemporary association is completely adogmatic and apolitical, and refuses to "introduce a solid religious or organisational order" because of the past internal conflicts, between 2000 and 2010 it had a complex structure, and redacted a Code of Native Faith defining a precise doctrine for Czech Rodnovery (which firmly rejected the Book of Veles). Though Rodná Víra no longer maintains structured territorial groups, it is supported by individual adherents scattered throughout the Czech Republic.

=== In the Slavic diaspora ===
There are practising Rodnovers among Lithuania's ethnic Russian minority. There are also homesteads of the Anastasian movement in Lithuania.

Followers of the Native Faith in Estonia have established a religious organisation, the Fellowship of the Russian People's Faith in Estonia. The fellowship was officially registered in Tartu in 2010.

In Australia there is Southern Cross Rodnovery, a Rodnover organisation that caters to Australians of Slavic ethnicity. It is officially registered as a charity by the government of Australia. In Australia, Canada, the United Kingdom, and the United States, within the Ukrainian diaspora, there are various congregations of the Native Ukrainian National Faith (RUNVira).

== See also ==
- Baltic neopaganism
- Armenian Hetanism
- Germanic Heathenism
- Romanian Zalmoxianism
- Russian Zoroastrianism
- Scythian Assianism
- European Congress of Ethnic Religions
- Ancient Iranian religion
- Outline of Slavic history and culture

== Sources ==
=== Secondary sources ===
- Aitamurto, Kaarina (2006). "Russian Paganism and the Issue of Nationalism: A Case Study of the Circle of Pagan Tradition". The Pomegranate: The International Journal of Pagan Studies. 8 (2): 184–210. doi:10.1558/pome.8.2.184.
- ——— (2007). "Neoyazychestvo or rodnoverie? Reflection, ethics and the ideal of religious tolerance in the study of religion". Obshchestvo ka sobytie: "Sistema" i "zhiznennyi mir". Omsk: SIBIT. pp. 53–70. ISBN 9785988670094.
- ——— (2008). "Egalitarian Utopias and Conservative Politics: Veche as a Societal Ideal within Rodnoverie Movement". Axis Mundi: Slovak Journal for the Study of Religions. 3: 2–11.
- ——— (2011). "Modern Pagan Warriors: Violence and Justice in Rodnoverie". In Lewis, James R. (ed.). Violence and New Religious Movements. Oxford: Oxford University Press. pp. 231–248. ISBN 9780199735631.
- ——— (2016). Paganism, Traditionalism, Nationalism: Narratives of Russian Rodnoverie. London / New York: Routledge. ISBN 9781472460271.
- Aitamurto, Kaarina; Gaidukov, Alexey (2013). "Russian Rodnoverie: Six Portraits of a Movement". In Aitamurto, Kaarina; Simpson, Scott (eds.). Modern Pagan and Native Faith Movements in Central and Eastern Europe. Durham, UK: Acumen. pp. 146–163. ISBN 9781844656622.
- Alekseev, Vadim (1999). "Тезаурус" [Tezaurus] ( (PDF)). In A. V. Shchipkov (ed.). Петербургское язычество: сб. ст [Paganism in Petersburg. Collection of articles] (PDF) (in Russian). Saint Petersburg: Apostolic City. ISBN 593112005X. Archived from the original on 3 November 2019.
- Alybina, Tatiana (2014). "Vernacular Beliefs and Official Traditional Religion" (PDF). Approaching Religion. 4 (1): 89–100. doi:10.30664/ar.67541. Archived from the original (PDF) on 7 July 2017.
- Andreeva, Julia Olegovna (2012a). "Представления о народных традициях в движении 'Звенящие кедры России'" [Representations of national traditions in the movement 'Ringing Cedars of Russia'] (PDF). In T. B. Shchepanskaya (ed.). Аспекты будущего по этнографическим и фольклорным материалам: сборник научных статей [Prospects of the future in ethnographic and folklore materials: Collection of scientific articles]. Saint Petersburg: Kunstkamera. pp. 231–245.
- ——— (2012b). "Вопросы власти и самоуправления в религиозном движении 'Анастасия': идеальные образы родовых поселений и 'Воплощение мечты'" [Questions of power and self-government in the religious movement 'Anastasia': Ideal images of ancestral settlements and 'Dreams coming true']. Anthropological Forum (in Russian). 17. Saint Petersburg: Kunstkamera; European University at Saint Petersburg. ISSN 1815-8870.
- Andreeva, Julia; Pranskevičiūtė, Rasa (2010). "The Meanings of Family Homestead in the Anastasia Movement: The Cases of Russia and Lithuania". Humanitāro zinātņu vēstnesis (18). Daugavpils University: 94–107.
- Barchunova, Tatiana (2009). "Downloading Cosmic Energy: Intersection of Faith-Based and Health-Care Practices (The Novosibirsk Case)". In Lūse, Agita; Lázár, Imre (eds.). Cosmologies of Suffering: Post-communist Transformation, Sacral Communication, and Healing. Cambridge Scholars Publishing. pp. 54–67. ISBN 9781443804004.
- Beskov, A. (2015). "Реминисценции восточнославянского язычества в современной российской культуре (статья первая)" [Reminiscences of East Slavic paganism in modern Russian culture (article one)]. Colloquium Heptaplomeres (in Russian) (2). Nizhny Novgorod: Nizhny Novgorod State Pedagogical University named after Kozma Minin: 6–18.
- ——— (2020). Russian Presidential Academy of National Economy and Public Administration (ed.). "Полезен ли анализ неоязыческих сообществ в соцсетях для оценки численности последователей русского неоязычества?" [Is the analysis of neopagan communities in social networks useful for assessing the number of followers of Russian neopaganism?]. State, Religion, Church in Russia and Abroad. 3 (38). Moscow: 306–330. doi:10.22394/2073-7203-2020-38-3-306-330 (inactive 1 July 2025). ISSN 2073-7203. S2CID 229235113.
- Bourdeaux, Michael; Filatov, Sergey, eds. (2006). Современная религиозная жизнь России. Опыт систематического описания [Contemporary religious life of Russia. Systematic description of experiences] (in Russian). Vol. 4. Keston Institute. Moscow: Logos. ISBN 5987040574.
- Chudinov, Sergey Ivanovich (2015). "Экоэтика как основа цивилизационного проекта неоязычества в России" [Ecoethics as the basis of the civilisation project of Neopaganism in Russia]. Colloquium Heptaplomeres (in Russian). II. Nizhny Novgorod: Minin University: 39–43. ISSN 2312-1696.
- Črnič, Aleš (2013). "Neopaganism in Slovenia". In Aitamurto, Kaarina; Simpson, Scott (eds.). Modern Pagan and Native Faith Movements in Central and Eastern Europe. Durham, UK: Acumen. pp. 182–194. ISBN 9781844656622.
- Dostálová, Anna-Marie (2013). "Czech Neopagan Movements and Leaders". In Aitamurto, Kaarina; Simpson, Scott (eds.). Modern Pagan and Native Faith Movements in Central and Eastern Europe. Durham, UK: Acumen. pp. 164–181. ISBN 9781844656622.
- Dulov, Vladimir (2013). "Bulgarian Society and Diversity of Pagan and Neopagan Themes". In Aitamurto, Kaarina; Simpson, Scott (eds.). Modern Pagan and Native Faith Movements in Central and Eastern Europe. Durham, UK: Acumen. pp. 195–212. ISBN 9781844656622.
- Dynda, Jiří (2014). "The Three-Headed One at the Crossroad: A Comparative Study of the Slavic God Triglav" (PDF). Studia mythologica Slavica. 17. Institute of Slovenian Ethnology: 57–82. doi:10.3986/sms.v17i0.1495. ISSN 1408-6271. Archived from the original (PDF) on 7 July 2017.
- Dzermant, Alexey (16 October 2011). Традиционная этническая религия в Беларуси [Traditional ethnic religion in Belarus]. Against the Post-Modern World (Actual Problems of Traditionalism) (in Russian). Faculty of Sociology, Moscow State University. Archived from the original on 29 April 2020.
- Foltz, Richard (2019). "Scythian Neo-Paganism in the Caucasus: The Ossetian Uatsdin as a 'Nature Religion'". Journal for the Study of Religion, Nature, and Culture. 13 (3): 314–332. doi:10.1558/jsrnc.39114. S2CID 213692638.
- Gaidukov, Alexei (1999). "Молодежная субкультура славянского неоязычества в Петербурге" [Youth subculture of Slavic Neopaganism in Petersburg]. In V. V. Kostyushev (ed.). Молодежные движения и субкультуры Санкт-Петербурга: Социология и антропологический анализ [Youth movements and subcultures of Saint Petersburg: Sociology and anthropological analysis] (in Russian). Saint Petersburg: Norma. pp. 24–50. ISBN 5878570319.
- ——— (2000). Herzen University (ed.). Ideology and practice of Slavic neopaganism (in Russian). St. Petersburg.
- ——— (2013). "The Russian-Language Internet and Rodnoverie". In Aitamurto, Kaarina; Simpson, Scott (eds.). Modern Pagan and Native Faith Movements in Central and Eastern Europe. Durham, UK: Acumen. pp. 315–332. ISBN 9781844656622.
- ——— (2016). "Новое язычество, неоязычество, родноверие: проблема терминологии" [New Paganism, Neopaganism, Rodnovery (Native Faith): The problem of terminology]. In Shizhensky, Roman V. (ed.). Язычество в современной России: опыт междисциплинарного исследования [Paganism in modern Russia: Experience of interdisciplinary research] (in Russian). Nizhny Novgorod: Minin University, Volga Region Printing House. pp. 24–46. ISBN 9785852195012.
- ——— Skachkova, Ye. Yu. (2019). "Одежда и священные знаки в воззрениях современных родноверов (по материалам социологического исследования)" [Clothing and sacred signs in the views of modern Rodnovers (based on sociological research)]. Знаки и знаковые системы народной культуры — 2019. Материалы 4-й Международной научно-практической конференции. 29—30 ноября 2019 г. Санкт-Петербург [Signs and sign systems of folk culture – 2019. Proceedings of the 4th International Scientific and Practical Conference. November 29—30, 2019, St. Petersburg]. Пантеон (in Russian). St. Petersburg. pp. 282–293.
- Gajda, Agnieszka (2013). "Romanticism and the Rise of Neopaganism in Nineteenth-Century Central and Eastern Europe: The Polish Case". In Aitamurto, Kaarina; Simpson, Scott (eds.). Modern Pagan and Native Faith Movements in Central and Eastern Europe. Durham, UK: Acumen. pp. 44–61. ISBN 9781844656622.
- Garshol, Lars Marius (2021). "Olav's Rose, Perun's Mark, Taranis's Wheel". Peregrinations: Journal of Medieval Art and Architecture. 7 (4): 121–151.
- Gizbrekht, Andrey I. (2016). "Образы деятелей российской истории в дискурсе современного 'Языческого искусства' (на материале изобразительного творчества)" [The images of public figures of Russian history in the discourse of modern 'Pagan art' (based on fine arts material)] (in Russian). Krasnodar National Institute of Culture. UDC: 298.9:7.044/.046.
- Golovneva, Elena (2018). "Saving the Native Faith: Religious Nationalism in Slavic Neo-paganism (Ancient Russian Yngling Church of Orthodox Old Believers-Ynglings and Svarozhichi)". In Stepanova, Elena; Kruglova, Tatiana (eds.). Convention 2017 "Modernization and Multiple Modernities". Vol. 3. Yekaterinburg: Knowledge E. pp. 337–347. doi:10.18502/kss.v3i7.2485. hdl:10995/82932. ISSN 2518-668X. S2CID 56439094. Archived from the original on 2021-08-28.
- Green, Demetria K. (2021). Rodnovery and the Russian Language: Linking Ancient Religion with the Evolution of East Slavic Languages (PDF) (Capstone). Baltimore, MD: Johns Hopkins Sheridan Libraries, Johns Hopkins University. Archived from the original (PDF) on 18 August 2021.
- Gronsky, Alexander Dmitrievich (2015). "Неоязычество как фактор деконструкции национального самосознания белорусов" [Neopaganism as a factor of deconstruction of the national identity of the Belarusians]. Colloquium Heptaplomeres (in Russian). II. Nizhny Novgorod: Minin University: 64–69. ISSN 2312-1696.
- Gutsulyak, Oleg (2015). "Україна як Ultima Frontiera – Останній рубіж: соціокультурні епістеми українського національного буття" [Ukraine as Ultima Frontiera – The Last Frontier: Sociocultural Epistemes of the Ukrainian National Being] (PDF) (in Ukrainian). Ivano-Frankivsk: Vasyl Stefanyk Precarpathian National University, Institute for the Development of Society, Sociological Association of Ukraine, Shevchenko Scientific Society, National Union of Local Lore of Ukraine. Archived from the original (PDF) on 29 April 2020.
- Ivakhiv, Adrian (2005a). "In Search of Deeper Identities: Neopaganism and 'Native Faith' in Contemporary Ukraine" (PDF). Nova Religio: The Journal of Alternative and Emergent Religions. 8 (3): 7–38. doi:10.1525/nr.2005.8.3.7. JSTOR 10.1525/nr.2005.8.3.7. Archived from the original (PDF) on 14 February 2020.
- ——— (2005b). "Nature and Ethnicity in East European Paganism: An Environmental Ethic of the Religious Right?". The Pomegranate: The International Journal of Pagan Studies. 7 (2): 194–225. doi:10.1558/pome.2005.7.2.194.
- ——— (2005c). "The Revival of Ukrainian Native Faith". In Strmiska, Michael F. (ed.). Modern Paganism in World Cultures: Comparative Perspectives. Santa Barbara, CA: ABC-Clio. pp. 209–239. ISBN 9781851096084.
- ——— (2008). "Neo-Paganism in Ukraine" ( (PDF)). In Bron, Taylor (ed.). The Encyclopedia of Religion and Nature. A&C Black. pp. 1188–1189. ISBN 9781441122780. Archived from the original on 19 January 2019.
- Ivanits, Linda J. (1989). Russian Folk Belief. M. E. Sharpe. ISBN 9780765630889.
- Jakobson, Roman (1985). Rudy, Stephen (ed.). Contributions to Comparative Mythology: Studies in Linguistics and Philology, 1972–1982. Walter de Gruyter. ISBN 9783110855463.
- Kaunov, Dmitry (2017). "Идеалы международного финно-угорского этнополитического движения и современный 'мерянский ренессанс' в областях бассейна Верхней Волги" [Ideals of the international Finno-Ugrian ethnopolitical movement and the contemporary 'Merya Renaissance' in the upper reaches of the Volga]. Studia Culturae (in Russian). 2 (32). Saint Petersburg's Philosophical Society: 81–94. ISSN 2225-3211.
- Kleinhempel, Ullrich (12–13 March 2015). New Religious Movements in Russia and the Position of the Orthodox Church. Forum Orthodoxie. Hannover: Evangelical Church of Germany.
- Konopleva, Anna Alekseevna; Kakhuta, Igor Olegovich (2019). "Причины популярности неоязычества в современном российском обществе" [Causes for the popularity of Neopaganism in modern Russian society] (PDF). Gramota (in Russian). 12 (10): 223–226. doi:10.30853/manuscript.2019.10.44. ISSN 2618-9690. Archived from the original (PDF) on 13 November 2020.
- Kośnik, Konrad; Hornowska, Elzbieta (2020). "A Preliminary Quantitative Study of the Mysticism and Religious Maturity of Contemporary Slavic Neopagans in Poland". Religio: Revue pro religionistiku. 28 (1): 73–93. doi:10.5817/Rel2020-1-6. ISSN 1210-3640.
- Kurepin, Sergey Viktorovich (2018). "Диалог православного христианства и неоязычества в контексте русской культуры" [Dialogue between Orthodox Christianity and Neopaganism in the context of Russian culture]. Colloquium Heptaplomeres (in Russian). V. Nizhny Novgorod: Minin University: 54–58. ISSN 2312-1696.
- Kutuzova, N. A. (2009). "Религиозный радикализм и альтернативные социальные проекты" [Religious radicalism and alternative social projects] (PDF). Herald of Brest University (in Russian). 3 (38). ISSN 1813-405X. Archived from the original (PDF) on 13 July 2019.
- Kuzmin, Aleksandr Gennadevich (2014). "Неоязыческая печать в современной России: особенности идеологии и пропагандистской деятельности" [Neopagan press in modern Russia: Specifics of ideology and propagandistic activity] (PDF). Gramota (in Russian). 12 (50): 121–24. ISSN 1997-292X. Archived from the original (PDF) on 5 February 2018.
- Laruelle, Marlène (2008). "Alternative Identity, Alternative Religion? Neo-Paganism and the Aryan Myth in Contemporary Russia". Nations and Nationalism. 14 (2): 283–301. doi:10.1111/j.1469-8129.2008.00329.x.
- ——— (2012). "The Rodnoverie Movement: The Search for Pre-Christian Ancestry and the Occult". In Menzel, Brigit; Hagemeister, Michael; Bernice Glatzer Rosenthal (eds.). The New Age of Russia: Occult and Esoteric Dimensions. Munich: Kubon & Sagner. pp. 293–310. ISBN 9783866881976.
- Lastoŭski, Aliaksiej (2011). "Russo-centrism as an ideological project of Belarusian identity" (PDF). Belarusian Political Scene Review. 1. Institute of Political Studies "Political Sphere", Vytautas Magnus University. Archived from the original (PDF) on 15 April 2019.
- Leeming, David (2005). The Oxford Companion to World Mythology. Sydney: Oxford University Press. ISBN 9780190288884.
- Lesiv, Mariya (2009). "Glory to Dazhboh (Sun-god) or to All Native Gods?: Monotheism and Polytheism in Contemporary Ukrainian Paganism" (PDF). The Pomegranate: The International Journal of Pagan Studies. 11 (2). doi:10.1558/pome.v11i2.197. Archived from the original (PDF) on 19 January 2019.
- ——— (2013a). The Return of Ancestral Gods: Modern Ukrainian Paganism as an Alternative Vision for a Nation. Montreal / Kingston: McGill-Queen's University Press. ISBN 9780773542624.
- ——— (2013b). "Ukrainian Paganism and Syncretism: 'This Is Indeed Ours!'". In Aitamurto, Kaarina; Simpson, Scott (eds.). Modern Pagan and Native Faith Movements in Central and Eastern Europe. Durham, UK: Acumen. pp. 128–145. ISBN 9781844656622.
- ——— (2017). "Blood Brothers or Blood Enemies: Ukrainian Pagans' Beliefs and Responses to the Ukraine-Russia Crisis". In Rountree, Kathryn (ed.). Cosmopolitanism, Nationalism, and Modern Paganism. New York: Palgrave Macmillan. pp. 133–156. ISBN 9781137570406.
- Lunkin, Roman; Filatov, Sergey (2000). "The Rerikh Movement: A Homegrown Russian 'New Religious Movement'" (PDF). Religion, State & Society. 28 (1): 135–148. doi:10.1080/713694743. S2CID 55200851. Archived from the original (PDF) on 5 August 2019.
- Mačuda, Jiří (2013). Ideologie rodnověří v názorech a praxi jeho čelních představitelů (se zaměřením na genezi a proměny obřadu) [Ideology of Rodnovery in attitudes and practices of its leaders (with a focus on the genesis and transformation of the ceremony)] (PDF) (Doktorska disertační práce/PhD thesis) (in Czech). Brno: Masaryk University, Faculty of Philosophy.
- ——— (2014). "Чешская община 'Родная вера' – возвращение к духовности предков" [The Czech community 'Rodná víra' – a return to the spirituality of the ancestors]. Colloquium Heptaplomeres (in Russian). I. Nizhny Novgorod: Minin University: 101–109. ISSN 2312-1696.
- Maiello, Giuseppe (2015). "Родноверие в Чехии в 1998–2005 годах: первый этап или последний?" [Rodnovery in Czechia in 1998–2005: The first stage or the last?]. Colloquium Heptaplomeres (in Russian). II. Nizhny Novgorod: Minin University: 83–88. ISSN 2312-1696.
- ——— (2018). "On the Agony of Czech Slavic Paganism and the Representation of One's Own Funeral among Contemporary Czech Pagans". The Pomegranate: The International Journal of Pagan Studies. 20 (2): 137–156. doi:10.1558/pome.32385.
- Mathieu-Colas, Michel (2017). "Dieux slaves et baltes" ( (PDF)). Dictionnaire des noms des divinités (in French). France: Archive ouverte des Sciences de l'Homme et de la Société, Centre national de la recherche scientifique. Archived from the original on 29 April 2020.
- Meranvild, Vladimir B. (2004). Славяно-горицкое движение как форма неоязычества [The Slavic-Hill movement as form of Neopaganism] (PhD thesis) (in Russian). Saint Petersburg.
- Moroz, Ye. L. (2005). The history of "Dead Water" - from a scary fairy tale to big politics. Political neo-paganism in post-Soviet Russia (in Russian). Stuttgart: ibidem-Verlag.
- Ozhiganova, Anna (2015). "Конструирование традиции в неоязыческой общине 'ПравоВеди'" [Construction of tradition in the Neopagan community 'PravoVedi']. Colloquium Heptaplomeres (in Russian). II. Nizhny Novgorod: Minin University: 30–38. ISSN 2312-1696.
- Pilkington, Hilary; Popov, Anton (2009). "Understanding Neo-paganism in Russia: Religion? Ideology? Philosophy? Fantasy?". In McKay, George (ed.). Subcultures and New Religious Movements in Russia and East-Central Europe. Peter Lang. pp. 253–304. ISBN 9783039119219.
- Popov, Igor (2016). Справочник всех религиозных течений и объединений в России [The Reference Book on All Religious Branches and Communities in Russia] (in Russian). Archived from the original on 22 March 2020.
- Pranskevičiūtė, Rasa (2015). "The 'Back to Nature' Worldview in Nature-based Spirituality Movements: The Case of the Anastasians". In Lewis, James R.; Inga Bårdsen Tøllefsen (eds.). Handbook of Nordic New Religions. Leiden: Brill. pp. 441–456. ISBN 9789004292468.
- Pribylovsky, Vladimir (1999). "Unknown facets of national extremism: Russian pagans". G2W (6).
- Prokofiev, A. V.; Filatov, Sergei; Koskello, Anastasia (2006). "Slavic and Scandinavian paganism. Wicca". In Bourdeaux, Michael; Filatov, Sergei (eds.). Modern religious life in Russia. Experience in systematic description (in Russian). Vol. 4. Keston Institute. Moscow: Logos. pp. 155–207. ISBN 5-98704-057-4.
- Prokopyuk, Natalya Valeryevna (2017). Неоязычество в современной России [Neopaganism in modern Russia] (Thesis) (in Russian). Tomsk: Tomsk State University.
- Rabotkina, S. (2013). "Світоглядні та обрядові особливості сучасного українського неоязичництва" [Worldview and ritual features of modern Ukrainian Neopaganism]. Herald of Dnipropetrovsk University. Philosophy, Sociology, Politology (in Ukrainian). 4 (23): 237–244.
- Radulovic, Nemanja (2017). "From Folklore to Esotericism and Back: Neo-Paganism in Serbia". The Pomegranate: The International Journal of Pagan Studies. 19 (1): 47–76. doi:10.1558/pome.30374.
- Reznik, Semyon (1991). "Yemelyanov case". Red and Brown, Book about Soviet Nazism. Washington: Vyzov.
- Rock, Stella (2007). Popular Religion in Russia: 'Double Belief' and the Making of an Academic Myth. Routledge. ISBN 9781134369782.
- Rountree, Kathryn, ed. (2015). Contemporary Pagan and Native Faith Movements in Europe: Colonialist and Nationalist Impulses. Berghahn Books. ISBN 9781782386476.
- Sadovina, Irina (2017). "The New Age paradox: Spiritual consumerism and traditional authority at the Child of Nature festival in Russia". Journal of Contemporary Religion. 32 (1): 83–103. doi:10.1080/13537903.2016.1256653. S2CID 152128991.
- Saunders, Robert A. (2019). "Rodnovery". Historical Dictionary of the Russian Federation (2nd ed.). Rowman & Littlefield. pp. 565–567. ISBN 9781538120484.
- Sedgwick, Mark (2012). "Occult Dissident Culture: The Case of Aleksandr Dugin". In Menzel, Brigit; Hagemeister, Michael; Bernice Glatzer Rosenthal (eds.). The New Age of Russia: Occult and Esoteric Dimensions. Munich: Kubon & Sagner. pp. 273–292. ISBN 9783866881976.
- Shizhensky, Roman (2009). "Neopagan myth about Prince Vladimir". Bulletin of the Buryat State University. Philosophy, Sociology, Political Science, Cultural Studies (6): 250–256.
- ——— (2012). "The Experience of Comparative Analysis of Texts by A. A. Dobrovolsky and H. F. Wirth (On the Question of the Source Base of Russian Neopagans)".
- Shizhensky, Roman; Aitamurto, Kaarina (2017). "Multiple Nationalisms and Patriotisms among Russian Rodnovers". In Rountree, Kathryn (ed.). Cosmopolitanism, Nationalism, and Modern Paganism. New York: Palgrave Macmillan. pp. 109–132. ISBN 9781137570406.
- ——— (2018). "Волховской посох: к вопросу о сакральной атрибутике русского язычества XXI века" [The staff of the volkhvs: On the question of sacred attributes in 21st-century Russian Paganism]. Colloquium Heptaplomeres (in Russian). V. Nizhny Novgorod: Minin University: 25–32. ISSN 2312-1696.
- ——— (2020). "Modern "rodnovery": fiducial points" (in Russian). Report at the round table: "Slavic paganism of the XXI century: problems of genesis and development", held on February 15, 2020 at the Nizhny Novgorod State Pedagogical University named after Kozma Minin.
- ——— (2021). "Neopaganism and the middle class" (in Russian). Lecture hall "Krapivensky 4". 03.02.2021.
  - The audience of the scientific lecture hall "Krapivensky 4" was presented with the report "Neopaganism and the middle class" // Patriarchia.ru. 04.02.2021.
- Shizhensky, Roman (2014). "Интервью с Велеславом (Ильёй Геннадьевичем Черкасовым)" [Interview with Veleslav (Ilya Gennadyevich Cherkasov)]. Colloquium Heptaplomeres (in Russian). I. Nizhny Novgorod: Minin University: 177–184. ISSN 2312-1696.
- Shlyapentokh, Dmitry (2014). "Антисемитизм истории: вариант русских неоязычников" [The antisemitism of history: The case of Russian Neopagans]. Colloquium Heptaplomeres (in Russian). I. Nizhny Novgorod: Minin University: 76–85. ISSN 2312-1696. The article was first publisher in English: Shlyapentokh, Dmitry (2012). "The Anti-Semitism of History: The Case of the Russian Neo-Pagans". European Review. 20 (2): 264–275. doi:10.1017/S1062798711000482. S2CID 144015361.
- Schnirelmann, Victor A. (1998). Russian Neo-pagan Myths and Antisemitism (PDF). Analysis of Current Trends in Antisemitism, Acta no. 13. Vidal Sassoon International Center for the Study of Antisemitism, Hebrew University of Jerusalem. Archived from the original (PDF) on 17 March 2021.
- ——— (2000). "Perun, Svarog and Others: Russian Neo-Paganism in Search of Itself". The Cambridge Journal of Anthropology. 21 (3): 18–36. JSTOR 23818709.
- ——— (2001). "Perun, Svarog and others: Russian neopaganism in search of itself". Neopaganism in the expanses of Eurasia. Moscow: Biblical and Theological Institute of St. Andrew the Apostle. pp. 10–38. ISBN 5-89647-050-9.
- ——— (2002). "'Christians! Go home': A Revival of Neo-Paganism between the Baltic Sea and Transcaucasia (An Overview)". Journal of Contemporary Religion. 17 (2): 197–211. doi:10.1080/13537900220125181. S2CID 51303383.
- ——— (2008a). "Koliada Viatichei". In Bron, Taylor (ed.). The Encyclopedia of Religion and Nature. A&C Black. pp. 967–968. ISBN 9781441122780.
- ——— (2008b). "Neo-paganism and Ethnic Nationalism in Eastern Europe" ( (PDF)). In Bron, Taylor (ed.). The Encyclopedia of Religion and Nature. A&C Black. pp. 1186–1188. ISBN 9781441122780. Archived from the original on 19 January 2019.
- ——— (2007). "Ancestral Wisdom and Ethnic Nationalism: A View from Eastern Europe". The Pomegranate: The International Journal of Pagan Studies. 9 (1): 41–61. doi:10.1558/pome.v9i1.41.
- ——— (2012). "Русское Родноверие: Неоязычество и Национализм в Современной России" [Russian Native Faith: Neopaganism and nationalism in modern Russia]. Russian Journal of Communication (in Russian). 5 (3): 316–318. doi:10.1080/19409419.2013.825223. S2CID 161875837.
- ——— (2013). "Russian Neopaganism: From Ethnic Religion to Racial Violence". In Aitamurto, Kaarina; Simpson, Scott (eds.). Modern Pagan and Native Faith Movements in Central and Eastern Europe. Durham, UK: Acumen. pp. 62–71. ISBN 9781844656622.
- ——— (2015). "Perun vs Jesus Christ: Communism and the emergence of Neo-paganism in the USSR". In Ngo, T.; Quijada, J. (eds.). Atheist Secularism and its Discontents. A Comparative Study of Religion and Communism in Eurasia. Palgrave Macmillan. pp. 173–189. ISBN 9781137438386.
- ——— (2017). "Obsessed with Culture: The Cultural Impetus of Russian Neo-Pagans". In Rountree, Kathryn (ed.). Cosmopolitanism, Nationalism, and Modern Paganism. New York: Palgrave Macmillan. pp. 87–108. ISBN 9781137570406.
- Simpson, Scott (2000). Native Faith: Polish Neo-Paganism At the Brink of the 21st Century. Zakład Wydawniczy "Nomos". ISBN 9788388508073.
- ——— (2012). "Strategies for Constructing Religious Practice in Polish Rodzimowierstwo". In A. Anczyk; H. Grzymała-Moszczyńska (eds.). Walking the Old Ways: Studies in Contemporary European Paganism. Katowice: Sacrum.
- ——— (2013). "Polish Rodzimowierstwo: Strategies for (Re)constructing a Movement". In Aitamurto, Kaarina; Simpson, Scott (eds.). Modern Pagan and Native Faith Movements in Central and Eastern Europe. Durham, UK: Acumen. pp. 112–127. ISBN 9781844656622.
- ——— (2017). "Only Slavic Gods: Nativeness in Polish Rodzimowierstwo". In Rountree, Kathryn (ed.). Cosmopolitanism, Nationalism, and Modern Paganism. New York: Palgrave Macmillan. pp. 65–86. ISBN 9781137570406.
- Simpson, Scott; Filip, Mariusz (2013). "Selected Words for Modern Pagan and Native Faith Movements in Central and Eastern Europe". In Aitamurto, Kaarina; Simpson, Scott (eds.). Modern Pagan and Native Faith Movements in Central and Eastern Europe. Durham, UK: Acumen. pp. 27–43. ISBN 9781844656622.
- Skrylnikov, Pavel A. (20 July 2016). "The Church Against Neo-Paganism". Intersection. Archived from the original on 7 July 2017.
- ——— (2016a). "Неоязычество сегодня: движение Merjamaa в региональном и общероссийском контексте" [Neopaganism today: The Merjamaa movement in the regional and Russian context]. Oikumena. Regional Researches (in Russian). 2 (37). Moscow: N.N. Miklukho-Maklai Institute of Ethnology and Anthropology: 99–105. ISSN 1998-6785.
- Skup, Anna (2013). "Źródła Rodzimej Wiary – wątki aryjskie i zadrużne w doktrynie związku wyznaniowego Rodzima Wiara" [Sources of Native Faith – Aryan and Zadruga themes in the doctrine of the religious association Native Faith] (in Polish). Krakow: Institute of Religious Studies, Faculty of Philosophy, Jagellonian University. Archived from the original on 2022-05-31.
- Smirnov, Nikolay (March 2020). "Shaman, Schismatic, Necromancer: Religious Libertarians in Russia". E-flux (107). Archived from the original on 19 April 2020.
- Strutyński, Maciej (2013). "The Ideology of Jan Stachniuk and the Power of Creation". In Aitamurto, Kaarina; Simpson, Scott (eds.). Modern Pagan and Native Faith Movements in Central and Eastern Europe. Durham, UK: Acumen. pp. 283–397. ISBN 9781844656622.
- Tyutina, Olga Sergeyevna (2015). "Эсхатологический компонент в современном славянском язычестве на примере концепции истории А. А. Добровольского" [The eschatological component in modern Slavic Paganism on the example of A. A. Dobrovolsky's concept of history]. Colloquium Heptaplomeres (in Russian). II. Nizhny Novgorod: Minin University: 44–47. ISSN 2312-1696.
- Velkoborská, Kamila (2008). "Pagan Identity and Tradition Today in the Czech Republic". Cosmos (24): 75–90. ISSN 0269-8773.
- Witulski, Maciej (2013). "'Imported' Paganisms in Poland in the Twenty-First Century: A Sketch of the Developing Landscape". In Aitamurto, Kaarina; Simpson, Scott (eds.). Modern Pagan and Native Faith Movements in Central and Eastern Europe. Durham, UK: Acumen. pp. 298–314. ISBN 9781844656622.
- Yashin, Vladimir Borisovich (2016). "Эсхатологические мотивы в современном русском неоязычестве" [Eschatological motifs in modern Russian Neopaganism]. Colloquium Heptaplomeres (in Russian). III. Nizhny Novgorod: Minin University: 36–42. ISSN 2312-1696.
- Young, Gedeon (2018). "Конструирование неоязыческой танатологии на примере 'Славянской книги мёртвых' волхва Велеслава" [Constructing Neopagan thanatology on the example of the 'Slavic Book of the Dead' by volkhv Veleslav]. Colloquium Heptaplomeres (in Russian). V. Nizhny Novgorod: Minin University: 59–72. ISSN 2312-1696.

=== Primary sources (Rodnover authors) ===
- Belov, Aleksandr K. (1992). Славяно-горицкая борьба. Книга 1: Изначалие [Slavic-hill wrestling. First book: Origination] (in Russian). Moscow: Zdorovye Naroda. ISBN 5-88531-003-3.
- Bezverkhy, Viktor (1993). "Волхвы. Философия истории" [The Volkhvs. Philosophy of History]. Volkhv: Journal (in Russian). 1 (7). Saint Petersburg: 3–102.
- ——— (1998) [1994]. История религии [History of Religion] (in Russian). Moscow: Vityazʼ. ISBN 5-86523-036-0.
- Cherkasov, Ilya (2009). Книга Родной Веры. Основы Родового Ведания Русов и Славян [Book of the Native Faith. Fundamentals of the Ancestral Knowledge of the Rus' and the Slavs] (in Russian). Vol. 2 vols. Moscow: Veligor. ISBN 9785917420127.
- ——— (2017). Torres, Alejo; Nechkasov, Evgeny (eds.). The Great Perfection Doctrine. Fall of Man.
- Harlender, Zdzisław (1937). Czciciele Dadźbóg Swarożyca [Worshippers of Dazhbog Svarozhich] (in Polish). Warsaw: Polish Library, State Publishing Institute.
- Kazakov, Vadim S. (2006) [1997]. Мир Славянских Богов [The World of the Slavic Gods] (in Russian) (revised ed.). Moscow: Russkaya Pravda. ISBN 5924300714.
- Lozko, Halyna S. (2006). Пробуджена Енея. Європейський етнорелігійний ренесанс [Awakened Aeneas. The European ethno-religious renaissance] (in Ukrainian). Kharkiv: Div. ISBN 9668504208.
- Maiello, Giuseppe (2016). Folk Belief and Traditions of the Supernatural. Beewolf Press. ISBN 978-8799633142.
- Makeyev, Daurbek B. (2007). "Ассианство и мировая культура" [Assianism and world culture]. Религиозное мировоззрение в Нартском эпосе [Religious worldview in the Nart epic] (in Russian). Vladikavkaz.
- Nagovitsyn, Aleksey E., ed. (2003). "Изведник русского язычества" [A Profession of Russian Paganism]. Вестник Традиционной Культуры. Выпуск 1 [Herald of Traditional Culture. Issue 1] (in Russian). Vorobyev A. V. ISBN 593883029X. Archived from the original on 28 January 2020.
- Petrović, Milan (2013). "Qualification of Slavic Rodnovery in scientific literature—neopaganism or ethnic religion" (PDF). Serbia: Svevlad Association of the Ecological and Ethnological Cultural Centre "Sfera". Archived from the original (PDF) on 7 July 2017.
- Potrzebowski, Stanisław (1982). Zadruga: eine völkische Bewegung in Polen [Zadruga: A folkish movement in Poland] (in German). Bonn: Institut für Angewandte Sozialgeschichte. ISBN 3923428006.
- ——— (2016). Słowiański ruch Zadruga [The Slavic movement Zadruga] (in Polish). Wrocław: Triglav Publisher. ISBN 9788362586967.
- Rodzimy Kościół Polski. Statut: Historia — Założenia programowe — Kult — Etyka — Obrzędy [The Native Polish Church. Statute: History — Program Principles — Cult — Ethics — Rituals] (PDF) (in Polish). 2013.
- Shaian, Volodymyr (1987). Віра Предків Наших [The Faith of Our Ancestors] (PDF) (in Ukrainian). Hamilton, ON: Association of Ukrainians of the Native Faith (Об’єднання Українців Рідної Віри). Archived from the original (PDF) on 30 April 2020.
- Speransky, Nikolay N. (2009). Книга Природной Веры [Book of the Natural Faith] (in Russian). Vol. 2 vols. Moscow: Veligor. ISBN 9785917420295.
- Stachniuk, Jan (2006) [1941]. Mit sławiański [The Slavic myth] (in Polish). Wrocław: Toporzel. ISBN 8385559299. Written in 1941, but not published until 2006.
- Stefański, Lech Emfazy (1980). Od magii do psychotroniki [From Magic to Psychotronics] (in Polish). Warsaw: Wiedza Powszechna. ISBN 9788321400754.
- ——— (2000). Wyrocznia Słowiąńska: Magiczny Krąg Świętowita [The Slavic Oracle: The Holy Circle of Svetovid] (in Polish). Warsaw: Studio Astropsyhlchologii. ISBN 9788386737086.
- Sylenko, Lev (1979). Мага Віра [Mighty Faith] (PDF) (in Ukrainian). Spring Glen, NY: Association of Sons and Daughters of the Native Ukrainian National Faith (Об’єднання Синів та Дочок Рідної Української Національної Віри). Archived from the original (PDF) on 30 April 2020.
- Yemelianov, Valery (1995) [1979]. Десионизация [De-Sionisation] (in Russian). Moscow: Vityaz'. ISBN 9785865230120. First published in 1970s in Arabian.
- Zubrzycki, Jan Sas (1925). "Bogoznawstwo Sławjan" [Slavic God-Knowing]. 13299 II (in Polish). Katowice: Odrodzenia.
