= Revolutionary wave =

Series of revolutions occurring in various locations within a similar time span

A revolutionary wave, sometimes revolutionary decade, is a series of revolutions occurring in various locations within a particular timespan. In many cases, past revolutions and revolutionary waves have inspired current ones, or an initial revolution has inspired other concurrent "affiliate revolutions" with similar aims. The causes of revolutionary waves have become the subjects of study by historians and political philosophers, including Robert Roswell Palmer, Crane Brinton, Hannah Arendt, Eric Hoffer, and Jacques Godechot.

Writers and activists, including Justin Raimondo and Michael Lind, have used the phrase "revolutionary wave" to describe discrete revolutions happening within a short time-span.

== Typology ==
Mark N. Katz identified six forms of revolution;

- rural revolution
- urban revolution
- Coup d'état, e.g. Egypt, 1952
- revolution from above, e.g. Mao's Great Leap Forward of 1958
- revolution from without, e.g. the allied invasions of Italy, 1944 and Germany, 1945.
- revolution by osmosis, e.g. the gradual Islamization of several countries.

These categories are not mutually exclusive; the Russian revolution of 1917 began with urban revolution to depose the Czar, followed by rural revolution, followed by the Bolshevik coup in November. Katz also cross-classified revolutions as follows;

- Central; countries, usually Great powers, which play a leading role in a Revolutionary wave; e.g. the USSR, Nazi Germany, Iran since 1979.
- Aspiring revolutions, which follow the Central revolution
- subordinate or puppet revolutions
- rival revolutions, e.g. communist Yugoslavia, and China after 1969

Central and subordinate revolutions may support each other militarily, as for example the USSR, Cuba, Angola, Ethiopia, Nicaragua and other Marxist regimes did in the 1970s and 1980s.

A further dimension to Katz's typology is that revolutions are either against (anti-monarchy, anti-dictatorial, anti-capitalist, anti-communist, anti-democratic) or for (pro-fascism, pro-liberalism, pro-communism, pro-nationalism etc.). In the former cases, a transition period is often necessary to decide on the direction taken.

== Periodisation ==
There is no consensus on a complete list of revolutionary waves. In particular, scholars disagree on how similar the ideologies of different events should be in order for them to be grouped as part of a single wave, and over what period a wave can be considered to be taking place – for example, Mark N. Katz discussed a "Marxist-Leninist wave" lasting from 1917 to 1991, and a "fascist wave" from 1922 to 1945, but limits an "anti-communist wave" to just the 1989 to 1991 period.

== Pre-19th century ==
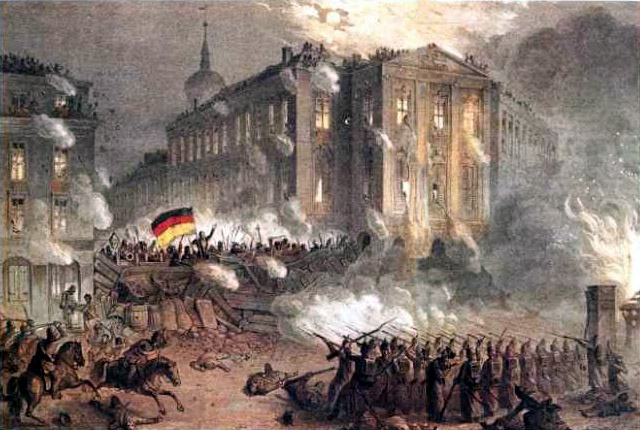
Revolutions of 1848

- Republican waves in Rome (509 BCE), Athens (508 BCE), Carthage (480 BCE), and Etruscan citites (Late 6th to early 5th century BCE, more peaceful).
- The Second Reformation (1566–1609), including the Revolt of the Netherlands and the Second and Third Wars of Religion in France.
- Jihadist wars in Western Africa in the 16th century.
- The Thirty Years' War (1618–1648), including Calvinist uprisings and the Huguenot Wars in France.
- The Atlantic Revolutions occurring at the end of the 18th century, including the American Revolution (1776), the French Revolution (1789), the Haitian Revolution (1791), the Batavian Revolution (1795) and the Irish Rebellion of 1798.

== 19th century ==
- The Latin American wars of independence, including the various Spanish American wars of independence of 1810–1826 were often seen as inspired at least in part by the American and French Revolutions in terms of their liberal Enlightenment ideology and aims, are counted as the second part of the Atlantic Wave.
- The Revolutions of 1820, also the Decembrist revolt of 1825 in Russia and the Greek War of Independence.
- The Revolutions of 1830, such as the July Revolution in France and the Belgian Revolution or November Uprising against the Russian rule in Poland.
- The Revolutions of 1848 throughout Europe, following the February Revolution in France.
- The 1868 Constitutional Wave, A synchronized wave of political transformations, including the Meiji Restoration in Japan (1868), the Glorious Revolution (La Gloriosa) in Spain (1868), and the outbreak of the Ten Years' War in Cuba (1868).
- The Great Eastern Crisis, including the Herzegovina uprising, April Uprising, Razlovtsi insurrection and the Cretan Revolt.

== 20th century ==
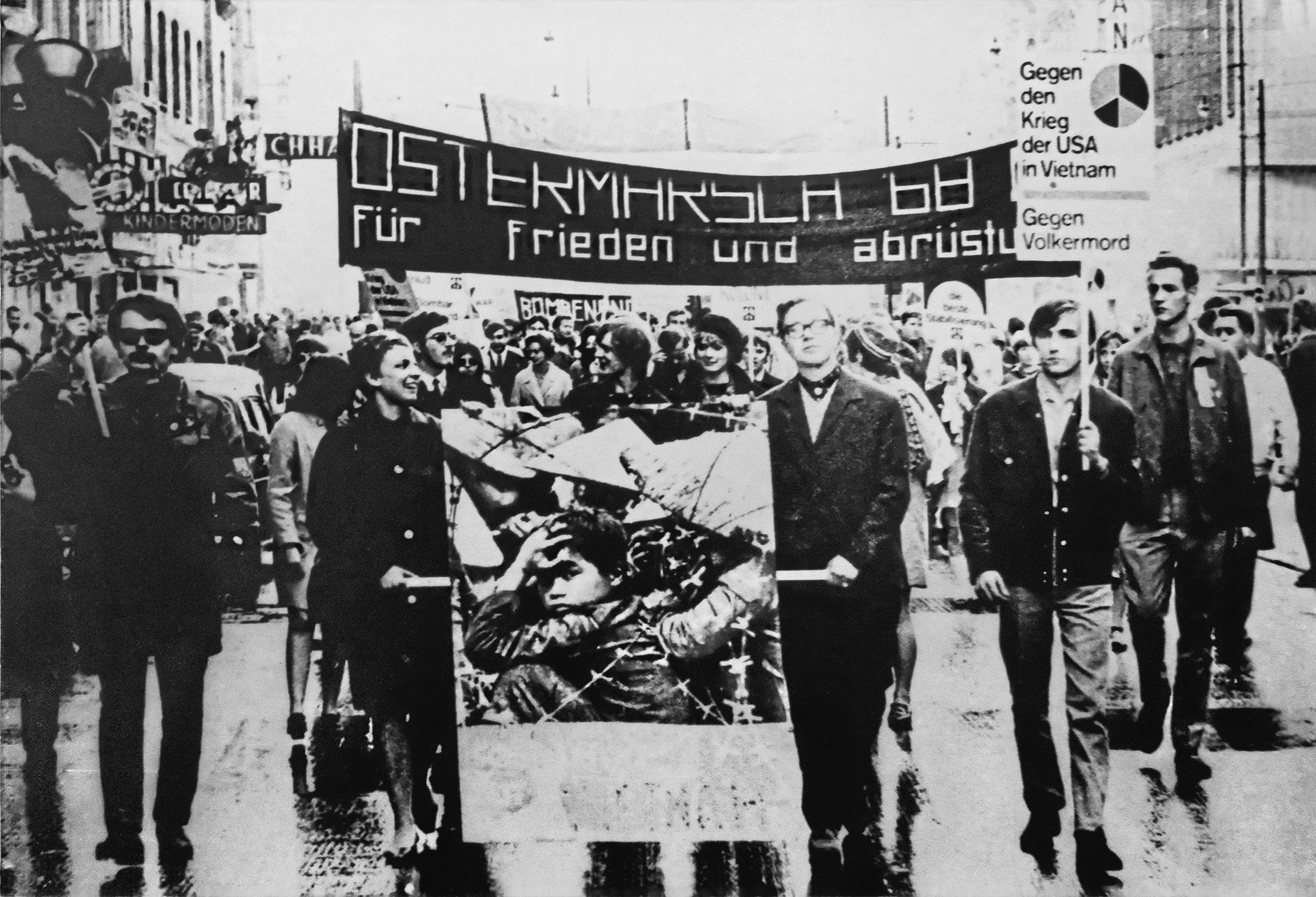
Protests against the Vietnam War in Vienna, Austria, 1968

- Several revolutions between 1905 and 1911, including the Russian Revolution of 1905, the Argentine Revolution of 1905, the Persian Constitutional Revolution, the Young Turk Revolution, the Greek Goudi coup, the Monegasque Revolution, the 5 October 1910 revolution in Portugal, the Mexican Revolution, and the Xinhai Revolution in China involved nationalism, constitutionalism, modernization, and/or republicanism targeting autocracy and traditionalism.
- The Revolutions of 1917–1923 in the aftermath of World War I, including the Russian Revolution and the emergence of an international communist party alliance in the Soviet-led Comintern (the beginning of the Marxist revolutionary wave), the collapse of the German Empire, Austro-Hungarian empire and Ottoman Empire and resultant founding of Yugoslavia, Czechoslovakia and independent Poland and Austria; the first protest of the Indian independence movement organized by Mohandas Karamchand Gandhi, the Kemalist revolution in Turkey; the 1919 Egyptian revolution, the Arab revolt, the Easter rising and Irish Free State; as well as other nationalist, populist and socialist uprisings and protests worldwide.
- The Fascist Revolutionary wave, beginning in Italy in 1922, also including the 28 May 1926 coup d'état in Portugal, Japan from 1931, Germany from 1933, Greece from 1936, and the Spanish Civil War.
- World War II Revolutions (1943–1949), including the French Resistance, Yugoslav Resistance, Strike Wave of 1945-46, Greek Civil War, and civil conflicts in Vietnam (1945–1949).
- The Indonesian National Revolution was a nationalist revolution in Southeast Asia after World War II.
- The First Indochina War was an anticolonial struggle, a communist revolution, and a proxy war.
- The decolonisation of Africa were waves of revolution in Africa, cresting in the 1970s, including the communist revolutions and pro-Soviet military coups in Somalia, the Congo-Brazzaville, Benin and Ethiopia, and the fight of the communist parties allied under CONCP against the Portuguese Empire in the Portuguese Colonial War.
- The Arab nationalist movement: revolutions occurred in Egypt, 1952; Iraq, 1958, 1963 and 1968; Algeria, 1962; North Yemen, 1962; Syria, 1963; Sudan and Libya, 1969. The central regime in this case was Egypt, inspired especially by Gamal Abdel Nasser.
- Following Nikita Khrushchev's "Secret Speech" denouncing Stalin in February 1956, a wave of political upheavals swept through the Eastern Bloc. In Poland, a workers' uprising in Poznań led to major political changes later that year, as the longtime Stalinist old guard of the Polish United Workers' Party was forced out of power in favor of a new, more independent-minded Communist leadership. Pro-reform movements in Hungary, inspired in part by the Polish upheavals, soon erupted into the Hungarian Revolution of 1956, a major popular uprising against the Soviet-backed regime in Budapest that was brutally crushed. There was also a nascent pro-reform movement in Romania that was suppressed.
- The Black Power movement and the civil rights movement organized successful protests against government and private discrimination. Continuing unrest in African-American communities led to the multi-city riots during the "Long, hot summer of 1967" and the various 1968 riots following the assassination of Martin Luther King Jr. In Trinidad the Black Power Revolution was successful.
- The Protests of 1968 saw youth movements worldwide supporting the opposition to the U.S. involvement in the Vietnam War and other left wing causes, the worldwide counterculture of the 1960s and the New Left inspired protest and revolution in the communist world and capitalist world, including the Prague Spring, Mao's Cultural Revolution in China, and the May 1968 protests in France; the latter led to the Werner Report on European monetary union.
- The Central American crisis saw a socialist movement take power in the Nicaraguan Revolution and leftist popular uprisings in El Salvador and Guatemala.
- The Fourteenth Islamic Revival of the late 1970s, with four notable mass movements including the:
  - Nizam e Mustafa movement and subsequent Islamization of Pakistan
  - Iranian revolution and subsequent Iranian Cultural Revolution
  - Herat Uprising and subsequent Afghan Soviet War, and the First Islamic Emirate
  - Grand Mosque Siege and subsequent acceleration of the Sahwa movement in Saudi Arabia
- The 1980s rise of various forms of religious fundamentalism, such as Revisionist Zionism, Neo-Zionism, the Likud government era, the Christian right and Christian Zionism, the Hindutva Janata Party and BJP in India, etc.
- The Revolutions of 1989 and the dissolution of the Soviet Union by the end of 1991, which ended the communist revolutionary wave, resulting in Russia and 14 countries declaring their independence from the Soviet Union: Armenia, Azerbaijan, Belarus, Estonia, Georgia, Kazakhstan, Kyrgyzstan, Latvia, Lithuania, Moldova, Tajikistan, Turkmenistan, Ukraine, and Uzbekistan. Communism soon was abandoned by other countries, including Afghanistan, Albania, Angola, Benin, Bulgaria, Cambodia, Congo-Brazzaville, Czechoslovakia, East Germany, Ethiopia, Hungary, Mongolia, Mozambique, Poland, Romania, Somalia, South Yemen, and Yugoslavia. Yugoslavia, and Czechoslovakia also collapsed in the early 1990s. In Latin America the right-wing dictatures of Paraguay, Chile, El Salvador and Guatemala ended between 1989 and 1996. Apartheid South Africa ended in early 1990s.

== 21st century ==
- The colour revolutions were various related movements that developed in several societies in the former Soviet Union and the Balkans during the early 2000s.
- The Arab Spring was a series of attempted revolutions in MENA countries during the 2010s.
- The Covid-19 protests were a series of worldwide protests against governments for their responses to the COVID-19 pandemic.
- The Gen Z protests saw various protests led by Gen-Z, some of them leading to regime changes, major motives being authoritarian governments, political corruption, and the Gaza war.
- The 2026 European unrest saw various protests in Europe in the latter half of the 2020s, caused by poor living conditions and unaffordability.

== In Marxism ==
Marxists see revolutionary waves as evidence that a world revolution is possible. For Rosa Luxemburg, "The most precious thing… in the sharp ebb and flow of the revolutionary waves is the proletariat's spiritual growth. The advance, by leaps and bounds, of the intellectual stature of the proletariat affords an inviolable guarantee of its further progress in the inevitable economic and political struggles ahead." The need for a world-wide socialist revolutionary wave for the survival of a socialist state has and continues to be a topic of controversy between Marxists, most notably between Trotskyists and mainline Marxist–Leninist.

== Potential revolutionary waves ==
Mark N. Katz theorises that Buddhism (in Sri Lanka, Thailand, Indochina, Burma, Tibet) and Confucianism (to replace Marxism in China and promote unity with the Chinese in Taiwan, Hong Kong, Singapore, Malaysia) might be the revolutionary waves of the future. In the past, these religions have been passively acquiescent to secular authority; but so was Islam, until recently.

Katz also suggests that nationalisms such as Pan-Turanianism (in Turkey, Central Asia, Xinjiang, parts of Russia), 'Pan-native Americanism' (in Ecuador, Peru, Bolivia, Paraguay) and Pan-Slavism (in Russia, Ukraine, Belarus) could also form revolutionary waves.

Chris Harman theorised within his book Revolution in the 21st Century, that since the Dissolution of the Soviet Union the contradictions of capitalism have only further accelerated, causing the revival of Marxism and resistance against capitalism, eventually leading to another revolutionary wave akin to the revolutions of the 20th century.

Harman uses the Nepalese Revolution, Pink tide, general strikes, and opposition to globalization as examples.

== See also ==
- Exporting the revolution
- Nationalism
- Revolutionary nationalism
- Proletarian internationalism
- Cycle of violence
- Domino theory
- Ideocracy
- Social cycle theory
- State collapse
- Power politics
- Power Politics (Wight book)
- The Anatomy of Power
- The Anatomy of Revolution
- The True Believer
- War cycles
- Economic Cycle
- Strike Wave
