= Fanaticism =

Behavior involving obsessive enthusiasm

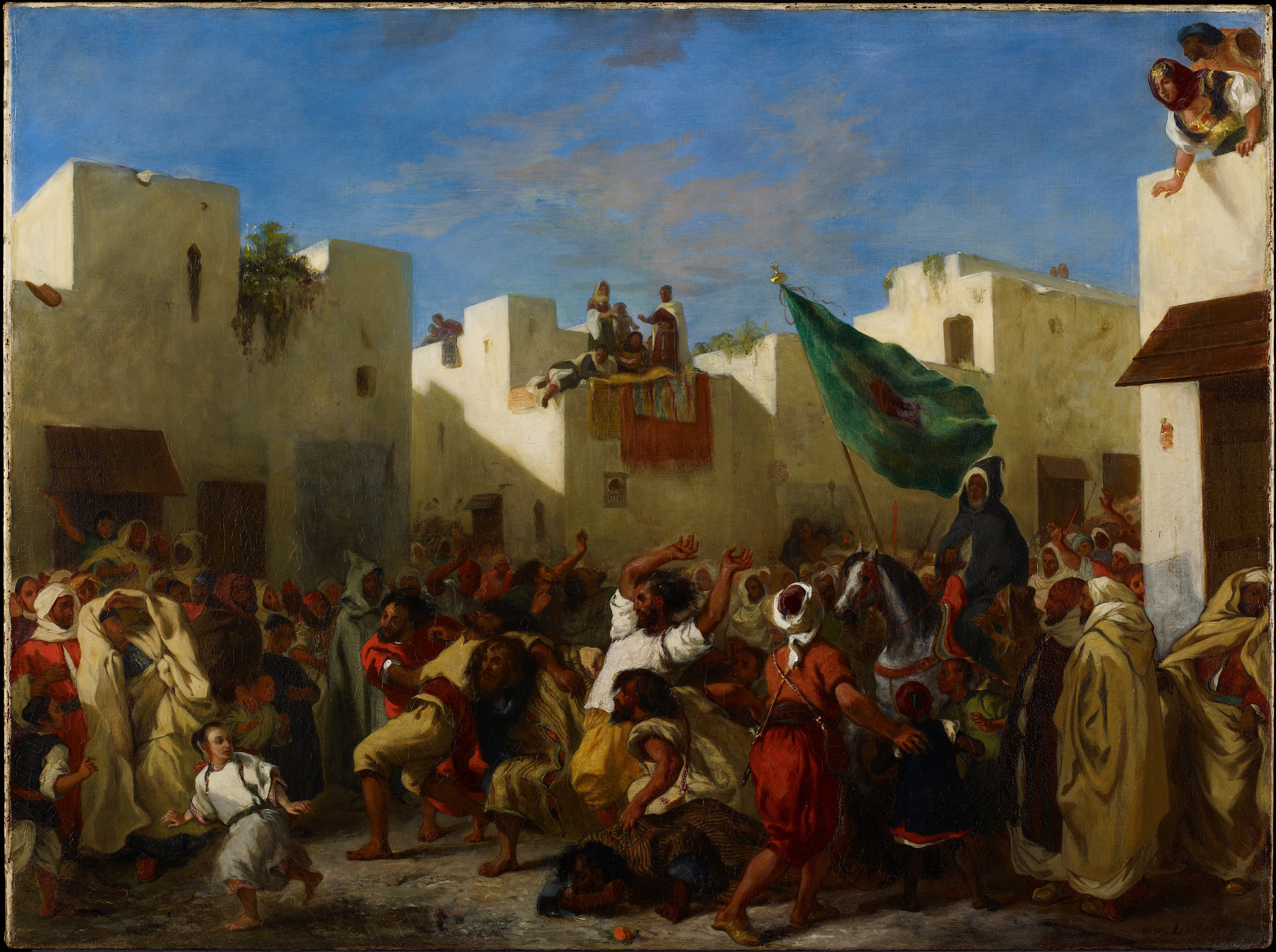
The Fanatics of Tangier by Eugène Delacroix, Minneapolis Institute of Arts

Fanaticism is a belief or behavior involving uncritical zeal or an obsessive enthusiasm. The political theorist Zachary R. Goldsmith provides a "cluster account" of the concept of fanaticism, identifying ten main attributes that, in various combinations, constitute it: messianism, inappropriate relationship to reason (irrationality), an embrace of abstraction, a desire for novelty, the pursuit of perfection, an opposition to limits, the embrace of violence, absolute certitude, excessive passion, and an attractiveness to intellectuals.

== Definitions ==
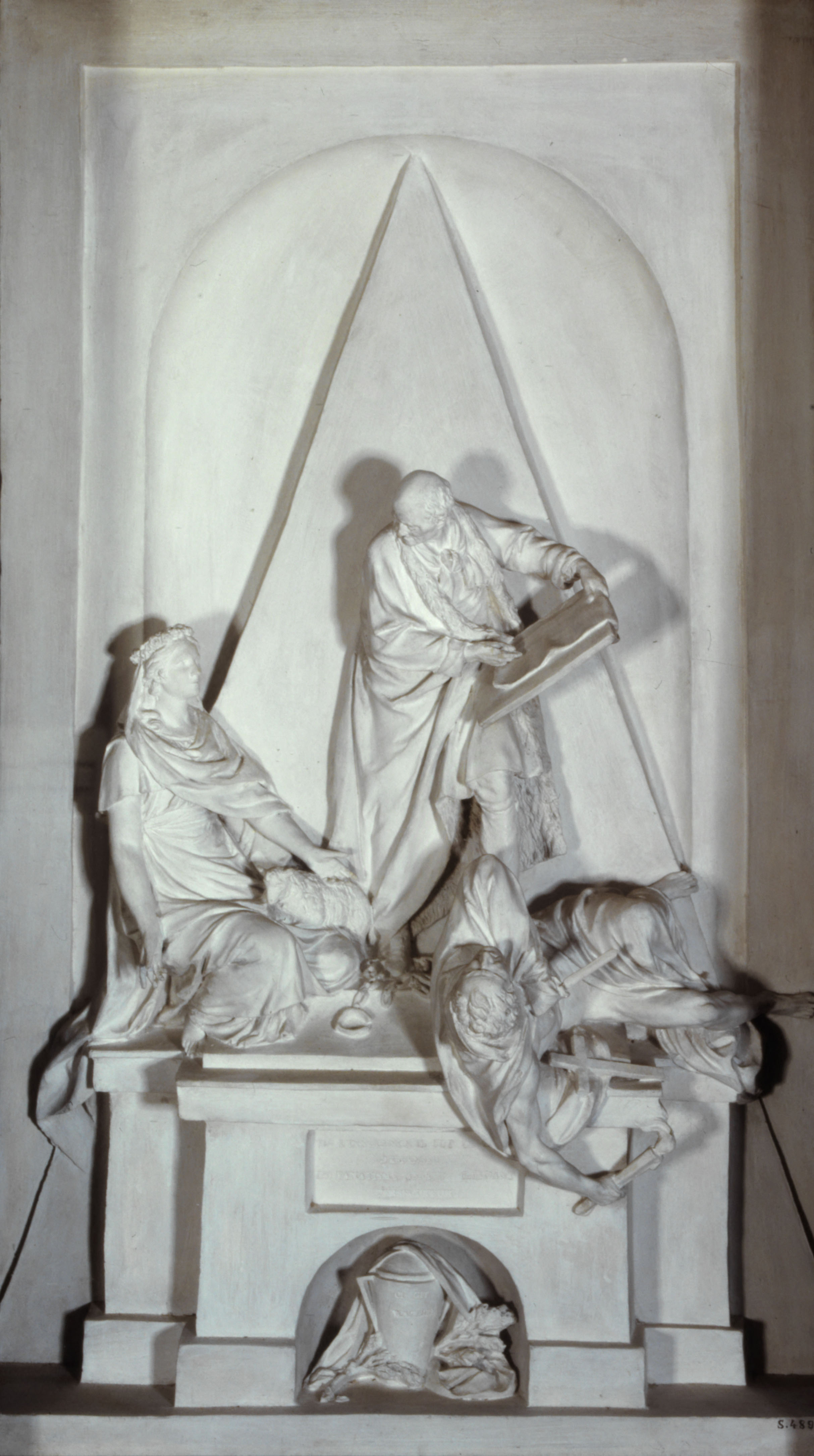
Etienne-Pierre-Adrien Gois, Voltaire defending Innocence against Fanaticism, c. 1791

Philosopher George Santayana defines fanaticism as "redoubling your effort when you have forgotten your aim". The fanatic displays very strict standards and little tolerance for contrary ideas or opinions. Tõnu Lehtsaar has defined the term fanaticism as the pursuit or defence of something in an extreme and passionate way that goes beyond normality. Religious fanaticism is defined by blind faith, the persecution of dissidents and the absence of reality.

== Causes ==
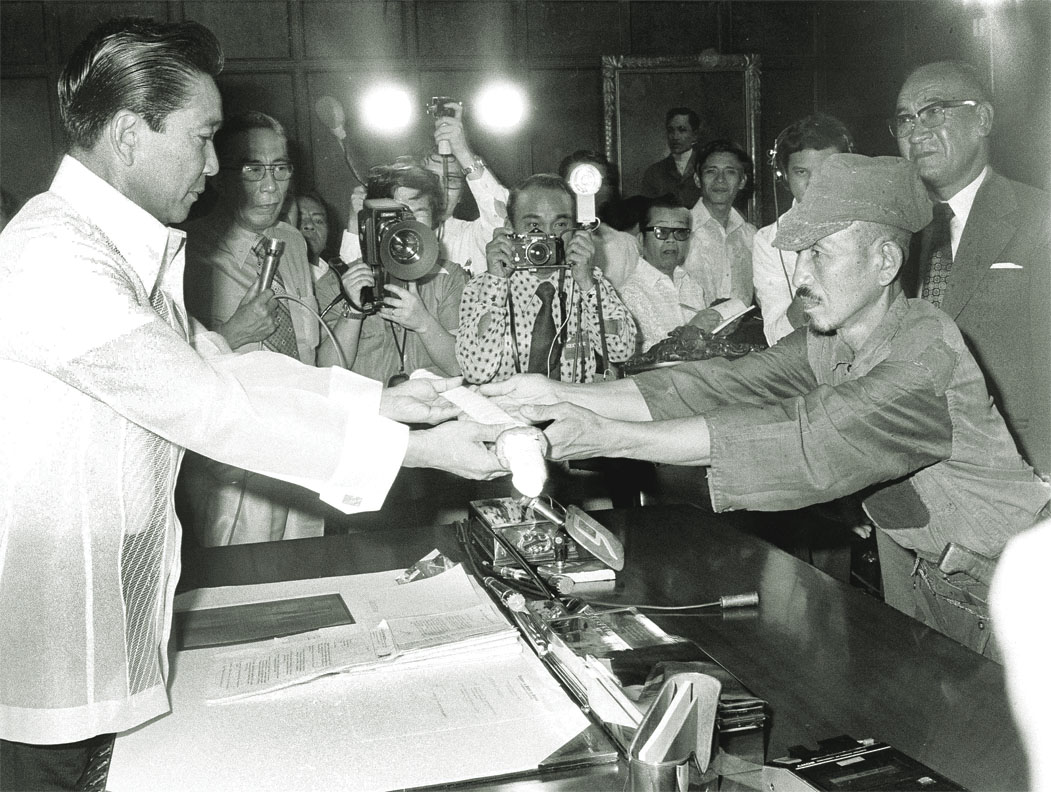
Japanese holdouts persisted on various islands in the Pacific Theatre until at least 1974. Hiroo Onoda offering his military sword on the day of his surrender.

Fanaticism is a result from multiple cultures interacting with one another. Fanaticism occurs most frequently when a leader makes minor variations on already existing beliefs, which then drives the followers into a frenzy. In this case, fanaticism is used as an adjective describing the nature of certain behaviors that people recognize as cult-like. Margaret Mead referred to the style of defense used when the followers are approached. The most consistent thing presented is the priming, or preexisting, conditions and mind state needed to induce fanatical behavior. Each behavior is obvious once it is pointed out; a closed mind, no interest in debating the subject of worship, and over reaction to people who do not believe.

In his book Crazy Talk, Stupid Talk, Neil Postman states that "the key to all fanatical beliefs is that they are self-confirming....(some beliefs are) fanatical not because they are 'false', but because they are expressed in such a way that they can never be shown to be false."

== Similar behaviors ==
The behavior of a fan with overwhelming enthusiasm for a given subject is differentiated from the behavior of a fanatic by the fanatic's violation of prevailing social norms. Though the fan's behavior may be judged as odd or eccentric, it does not violate such norms. A fanatic differs from a crank, in that a crank is defined as a person who holds a position or opinion which is so far from the norm as to appear ludicrous and/or probably wrong, such as a belief in a Flat Earth. In contrast, the subject of the fanatic's obsession may be "normal", such as an interest in religion or politics, except that the scale of the person's involvement, devotion, or obsession with the activity or cause is abnormal or disproportionate to the average.

== Types ==
- Consumer fanaticism – the level of involvement or interest one has in the liking of a particular person, group, trend, artwork or idea
- Emotional fanaticism
- Ethnic or racial supremacist fanaticism
- Leisure fanaticism – high levels of intensity, enthusiasm, commitment and zeal shown for a particular leisure activity
- Nationalistic or patriotic fanaticism
- Political, ideological fanaticism.
- Religious fanaticism – considered by some to be the most extreme form of religious fundamentalism. Entail promoting religious point of views
- Sports fanaticism – high levels of intensity surrounding sporting events. This is either done based on the belief that extreme fanaticism can alter games for one's favorite team (Ex: Knight Krew), or because the person uses sports activities as an ultra-masculine "proving ground" for brawls, as in the case of football hooliganism.

== See also ==
- The Anatomy of Revolution
- Antifanaticism: A Tale of the South
- Basking in reflected glory
- Celebrity worship syndrome
- Cult of personality
- Enthusiasm
- Extremism
- Falsifiability
- Fan (person)
- Fan loyalty
- Fanboy
- Fixation (psychology)
- M. Lamar Keene
- Obsession (psychology)
- The True Believer
  - True-believer syndrome
- Zealotry
