= Fan loyalty =

Loyalty felt and expressed towards object of fanaticism

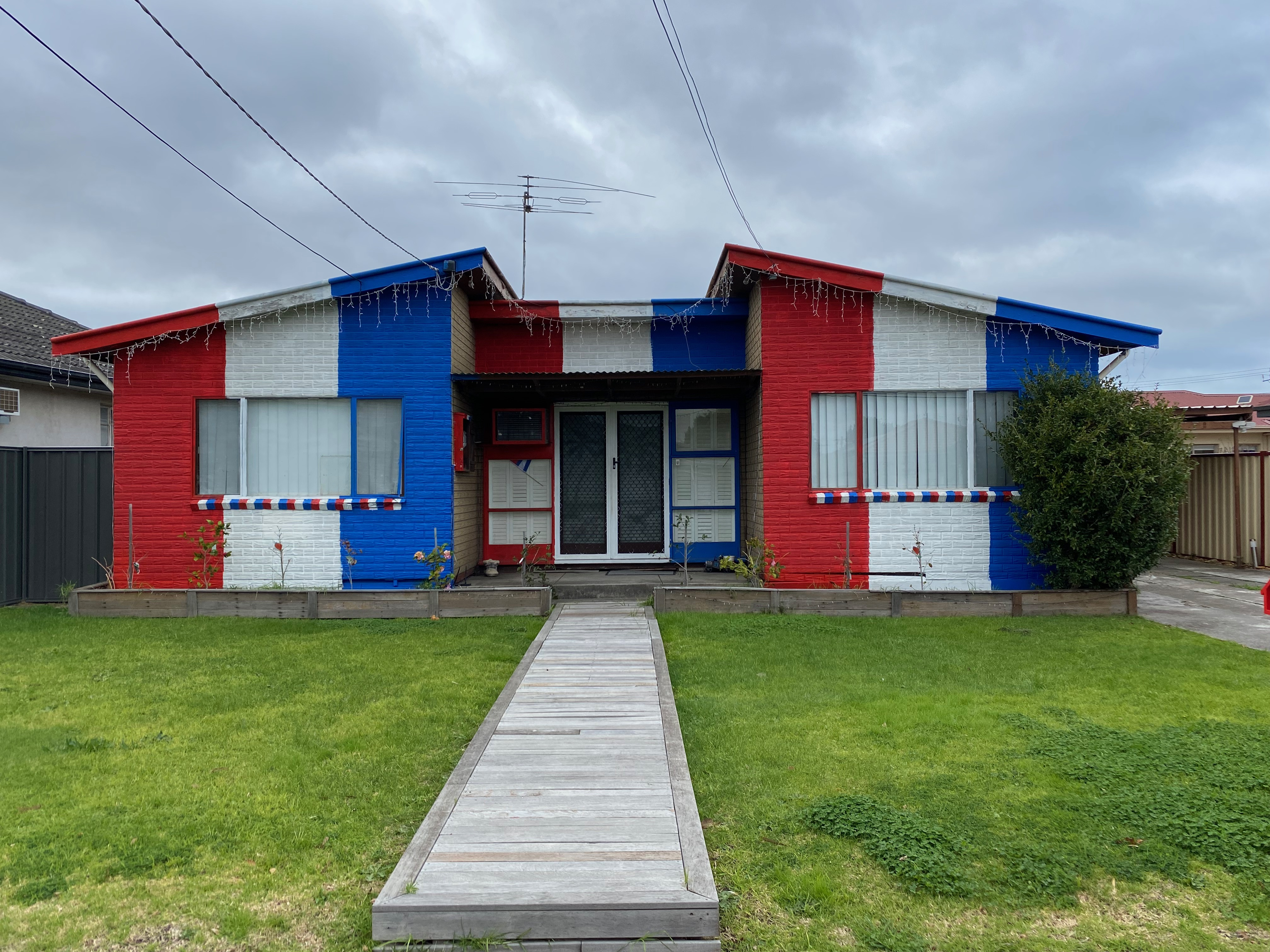
A home in Melbourne painted in the colours of the Western Bulldogs Football Club

Fan loyalty is the loyalty felt and expressed by a fan towards the object of their fanaticism. Fan loyalty is often used in the context of sports and the support of a specific team or institution. Fan loyalties can range from a passive support to radical allegiance and expressions of loyalty can take shape in many forms and be displayed across varying platforms. Fan loyalty can be threatened by team actions. The loyalties of sports fans in particular have been studied by psychologists, who have determined several factors that help to create such loyalties.

== Underpinning psychology ==
Given the extensive costs involved in managing and operating a professional team sport, it is beneficial for sports marketers to be conscious of the elements that establish a strong brand and the effect they have on fan loyalty, so they can best cater to their current fans while acquiring new ones. This is because fans and spectators are considered key stakeholders of professional sports organisations. Fans directly and indirectly influence the production of operating revenue through purchasing merchandise, buying game tickets and improving the value that can be obtained from television broadcasting deals and sponsorship. Therefore, fans are a key factor to consider in determining the economic success of a sports club.

Individual consumers can develop deep psychological connections with new teams even without direct encounters or firsthand experiences. It is possible for people to form meaningful attachments to a team before they have seen it compete. Brand management strategies enable sports organizations to capitalize on consumers' ability to form these connections in order to expand the fan experience, attract new audiences, and cultivate long-term relationships with consumers through multifaceted forms of engagement, including social media. Teams must develop compelling and distinct brands to differentiate themselves from their competitors as a means to attract fan support and loyalty.

Loyalty programmes positively shape fan attachment and behaviour as it connects teams and their fans, aside from a club's season ticketholder database. It not only provides marketers with essential information about consumers and their thinking, but also acts as a channel to promote attendance and an opportunity to add value to their game day experience.

Bauer et al. concludes that non product related attributes such as contextual factors (other fans, the club history and tradition, logo, club colours and the stadium atmosphere) hold a higher place in fan experience than product related attributes such as the team's winning record. Therefore, to increase fan loyalty (customer retention) Bauer et al. suggests sports marketers focus on targeting non product related benefits and brand attributes. As a result of fostering this loyalty, sports organisations can afford to charge prices at premium. Fan loyalty also leads to dependable ratings in broadcast media which means broadcasters can also charge premiums for advertising time in team broadcasts with loyal followings. A flow on effect from fan loyalty is the ability to create additional revenue streams outside of the core product such as merchandise shops and food venues that are close to the location of the game if the team chooses to own and operate ventures or share licensing agreements.

Fan loyalty, particularly with respect to team sports, is different from brand loyalty, in as much as if a consumer bought a product that was of lower quality than expected, he or she will usually abandon allegiance to the brand. However, fan loyalty continues even if the team that the fan supports continues to perform poorly year after year. Author Mark Conrad uses the Chicago Cubs as an example of a team with a loyal fan following, where fans spend their money in support of a poorly performing team that (until 2016) had not won a pennant since 1945 or a World Series since 1908.

They attribute it to the following factors:

Entertainment Value
The entertainment value that a fan derives from spectating motivates him/her to remain a loyal fan. Entertainment value of team sports is also valuable to communities in general.
Authenticity
This is described by Passikoff as "the acceptance of the game as real and meaningful".
Fan Bonding
Fan bonding is where a fan bonds with the players, identifying with them as individuals, and bonds with the team.
Team History and Tradition
Shank gives the Cincinnati Reds, all-professional baseball's oldest team, as an example of a team where a long team history and tradition is a motivator for fans in the Cincinnati area.
Group Affiliation
Fans receive personal validation of their support for a team from being surrounded by a group of fans who also support the same team.
Fair Weather Fans
Fans that engage when a team is good, and lose interest when a team is bad.
Bandwagon Fans
Fans who support the winning team, instead of supporting the same team year after year.
Diehard Fans
Fans who follow their team no matter if they are winning or losing.

== Factors influencing fan loyalty ==
=== Community ===
Fan loyalty attachment is strengthened through communal ties that connect fans around a team, forming a community that results in regular fan interaction. This interaction is particularly important as fans may not develop solely an intra-psychic team identity but predominantly display behavioural loyalty through the group consumption of indirect sport experiences instead, such as wearing the team colours, singing, cheering, flags and interaction between the sport's team's fans (e.g. laughing, talking) Through indirect sport experiences, the stadium atmosphere can be heightened and as a result, the frequency of fan attendance can increase.

Furthermore, by wearing team apparel, fans can visually identify with one another resulting an increased likelihood of opportunities to engage with others socially through this point of connection. For example, a study on NASCAR fans found that their personal identity was connected to the brand itself as they felt connected to the larger community of NASCAR revealing an emotional connection to the brand. This indicates that their fan loyalty will result in the notion that fans are naturally more resistant to the promotional efforts of competing brands (e.g. lower-price offers) as their emotional commitment to NASCAR is greatly embedded in their sense of identity. When they associate themselves with the sponsors because of the sponsor's relation to the brand, they are solidifying their relationship with NASCAR and are therefore reinforcing their identity. Consequently, their fan loyalty translates into brand loyalty so long as the sponsor remains attached to the subject of their fanaticism, NASCAR, meaning they are less price sensitive and more willing to pay premium prices for sponsor's products or services. Another aspect of consumer behaviour regarding fan loyalty is the existence of consumption communities where members feel a sense of unity when they participate in the group consumption of brand sponsors’ goods and services further strengthening their ties to a brand and its sponsors. However, a strategy sports marketers use to appeal to a wider range of fan identities is to sponsor more than one club in sports such as soccer. This is so they are careful not to come across as a singularly affiliated club brand, where the opinion or perceptions of opposing teams’ fans would be one of disfavour towards them.

=== Brand association ===
Any benefit or characteristic connected to a brand as perceived by a consumer is called a brand association. These hold significance over the thoughts and opinions a consumer holds about a brand and can therefore influence one's loyalty. These associations provide a reference point to gauge the salience of a brand which is the perceived favourability associated with it. Brand salience is vital because it ultimately effects the likelihood of brand selection and loyalty leading to steadier spectator numbers, and an increase in attention from the media such as advertisers and sponsors.

However, loyalty is a developmental process. According to Bee & Havitz (2010), spectators who are highly involved in the participation of a sport and exhibit psychological commitment, possess the capability to display high levels of behavioural loyalty as they develop into committed fans. On the other hand, neutral or negative feelings towards a team are found to foster indifference or cause an individual to disidentify with a team altogether. A model of ‘escalating commitment’, put forward by Funk and James (2001), demonstrates an individual's movement from ‘awareness’ of team to a subsequent ‘allegiance’ but came to the conclusion that more research was required to find out the key influences that lead one to the highest state of commitment. However, brand association development is fostered under brand management within a sports organisation. It is important for sports management research to identify their brand associations in order to influence management and marketing actions as they reflect the meaning and value extracted from the team as well as the integral characteristics of a team.

Five personality traits are used as a brand personality identification method for sports teams. These include competitiveness, morality, credibility, prestige and authenticity. The team's aptitude to defeat competitors and attain goals is a measure of its competitiveness relating to descriptions such as triumphant, winning, dynamic, proud, successful and ambitious. Morality indicates fans’ thoughts and opinions about a team's code of conduct relating to their quality of character like being principled, ethical and cultivated. The degree to which a team resonates with self-assurance and confidence captures their credibility consisting of traits such as being influential and/or wealthy. The overall credit for a team's achievements and its superiority in relation to other teams relates to a team's prestige characterised by descriptions such as glorious, strong, honourable and great. Authenticity encapsulates the uniqueness of a team with descriptions corresponding to being uncompromising, radical or traditional. When teams are perceived as having human traits, the emotional connection between sports team and their sports fan is strengthened due to the ability to link their self-identity, with the team's identity, showing congruence with the brand's personality. Aspects that enable fan identification with a sports team are considered to be predictors of their consumption behaviour such as the continuation of support and participation in the team's activities even after long losing streaks.

=== Motivations ===
Team success is not necessarily linked to fan loyalty when it comes to highly committed fans. Therefore, loyal fans supply a steady flow of revenue irrespective of team performance. Nevertheless, providing exclusive access to players, other team members and executives as well as coaches can be a successful means to offer value to a highly committed fan. Aspects relating to a club's brand image that motivate fan loyalty include peer group acceptance (e.g. through consumption communities), escapeism, identification, nostalgia, emotion, socialisation/companionship and entertainment. Across these aspects, messages communicated from the brand to the fan must be understandable, straightforward and consistent. By strengthening these features of psychological commitment towards a team, it provides a stable foundation for brands to ultimately increase their fans’ behavioural loyalty. The ability to stipulate nostalgic memories is foretelling of fan loyalty towards a sports team. Nostalgic memories provide highly committed fans with an escape from day-to-day life and are most likely induce positive feelings, enhancing their experience with the brand whether it be on game day or through brand communication channels such as a television commercial.

Motivating factors that may also lead fans to support a team may be due to proximity of the team or the fan base. Closer proximity allows for a greater likelihood of personal connection because of mere familiarity. Additional motivating factors that may increase fan loyalty may be the demeanor or reputation of the team. Teams that exemplify the highest virtues of the game may have a more motivational pull, due to the alignment of values.

== Social media influence ==
In the past, consumers received relational marketing endeavours through brands. Today, social networking sites make it possible for companies to interact with their customers on a larger scale. Allowing for consumers to become “co-creators and multipliers of brand messages”, providing more opportunity for campaigns to go viral and establish prospects for word-of-mouth marketing through reviews and sponsor endorsements. Fan pages for brands on social networking sites are managed by placing importance on the design of their page with features that enable consultation, location, searching and access to content. By doing this, brands aim to increase the inherent trust of their consumers, as better navigation experiences allow for a positive touchpoint experience and thus improved fan loyalty. This results in an increase in consumers' willingness to visit and use the page. As well as fan page design, content needs to be of interest to the user. This means brands need to regularly update relevant, well-organised content that consumers can readily identify, locate and access.

Emotional connection is central to fan loyalty and therefore is important for brands to promote it on their social media by reinforcing user trust in their site page. By communicating to the consumer about how much the brand is considering them, it increases consumer trust as they feels cared for by the brand. A brand's fan page must also align with their out workings such as delivering items in the time guaranteed on their social media pages to ensure a message of honesty, competence and trustworthiness is communicated to the consumer. To ensure customers consider an encounter with the page valuable and worthwhile, brands need to improve the usefulness of their page by offering exclusive offers only available through a given touchpoint e.g. a 20% off selected merchandise voucher only offered to those who have subscribed to the mailing list. Exclusivity encourages fan loyalty as it fosters the emotional connection of the fan feeling like a part of the team or brand's inner circle.

Fan pages also allow for customer-to-customer connections where they can interact and share a brand's page content, such as ‘sharing’ the brand's post on Facebook, as well as sharing user-generated content. Other consumers can then use the ‘reaction’ button and comment thread on Facebook to communicate their response allowing for brand managers to gauge their fans’ feeling and opinions, strengthening the brand-customer relationship.

== Measurements and indices of fan loyalty ==
A Fan Loyalty Index was compiled from a survey of Major League Baseball fans in April 1997, and printed in the Forecast newsletter. Fans were asked to rate their hometown teams on each of four scales. The index ranged from the Chicago Cubs at the top, with a loyalty index of 132, to the Chicago White Sox at the bottom with a loyalty index of 73. The index was scaled such that the mean loyalty index was 100, as scored by both the Colorado Rockies and the Pittsburgh Pirates.

=== Fairweather fans ===
Several psychologists have studied fan loyalty, and what causes a person to be a loyal fan, who sticks with a team through adversity (win or lose), rather than a bandwagon fan or fairweather fan, who switches support to whatever teams are successful. These include Dan Wann, a psychologist at Murray State University, and Robert Passikoff. Passikoff studied the loyalties of U.S. sports fans towards all Major League sports in the summer of 2000, finding that loyalty to Major League Baseball scored the highest, followed by the National Basketball Association, the National Football League, and the National Hockey League.

== Threats to loyalty ==
Shank observes that fan loyalty in the U.S. is perhaps higher towards sports teams than any other form of consumer loyalty to goods and services. However, loyalty can be threatened. Fan loyalty towards professional-level sports is beginning to erode in the U.S. as a consequence of continual threats to uproot franchises and to move them to other cities. Shank considers that this is perhaps the reason behind the increased popularity of amateur athletics. School and college teams do not threaten to move away from the fans in order to obtain a better deal on their sports stadiums. Athletes in school and college athletics are not traded to and from other teams and do not move around in search of better contracts (although they do sometimes leave their schools and colleges early to transfer elsewhere or for professional contracts).

Some professional sports teams have taken measures to combat this erosion. The Nashville Predators employ customer relationship management techniques to collect information about the demographics and psychographics of their fans. Their loyalty program involves a loyalty card that is swiped through a card reader in kiosks at the entrances to team events. The team can gather data on the fans, and the fans are rewarded by collecting points that are redeemable against tickets, merchandise, and concessions. The vice president of ticket sales for the Predators, Scott Loft, is quoted by Shanks as observing that "90 percent of sports teams either don't care or don't bother to find out any information about their fan base", however.
