= List of nicknames of philosophers =

Some philosophers have commonly used nicknames. All the nicknames on this list have sources that attest to their use.

== Nicknames ==
- Artist's Philosopher: Arthur Schopenhauer
- Beekeeper Philosopher: Richard Clyde Taylor
- Father of Existentialism: Søren Kierkegaard
- Father of Logic: Aristotle
- The Jewish Luther: Moses Mendelssohn
- Laughing Philosopher: Democritus
- Longshoreman Philosopher: Eric Hoffer
- Mother of Feminism: Mary Wollstonecraft
- Philosopher of Fascism: Giovanni Gentile
- Plato: Aristocles son of Ariston, but see Plato#Name.
- The Philosopher: Aristotle
- Weeping Philosopher: Heraclitus
- Bottled Wasp (a.k.a. Wasp in a Bottle): Charles Sanders Peirce
- The American Aristotle: Charles Sanders Peirce
