= Nepalese revolution =

Nepalese revolution may refer to:

- 1951 Nepalese revolution
- 1990 Nepalese revolution
- Nepalese Civil War fought from 1996 to 2006
- 2006 Nepalese revolution
- 2025 Nepalese Gen Z protests

== See also ==
- Nepal Bhasa renaissance
