= Eric Hoffer =

American moral and social philosopher (1902–1983)

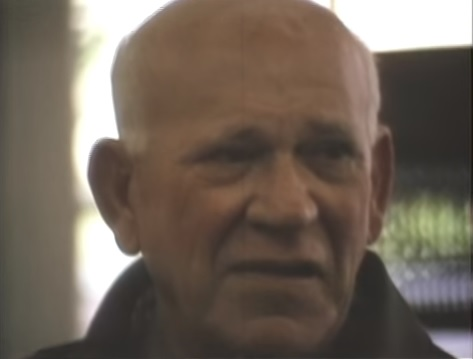
- Eric Hoffer in 1967, in the Oval Office, visiting President Lyndon Baines Johnson
- Born: July 25, 1902; New York City, U.S.
- Died: May 21, 1983 (aged 80); San Francisco, California, U.S.
- Occupations: Author, longshoreman
- Writing career
- Genres: Philosophy, social criticism
- Notable awards: Presidential Medal of Freedom, 1983

Eric Hoffer (July 25, 1902 – May 21, 1983) was an American philosopher and social critic. A moderate with an atypical working-class background, Hoffer wrote ten books over his career and was awarded the Presidential Medal of Freedom in February 1983. His first book, The True Believer (1951), was widely recognized as a classic, receiving critical acclaim from both scholars and laymen, although Hoffer believed that The Ordeal of Change (1963) was his finest work. The Eric Hoffer Book Award is an international literary prize established in his honor. The University of California, Berkeley awards an annual literary prize named jointly for Hoffer.

== Early life ==
Many elements of Hoffer's early life are unverified, but in autobiographical statements, Hoffer claimed to have been born in 1902 in The Bronx, New York City, New York, to Knut and Elsa (Goebel) Hoffer. His parents were immigrants from Alsace, then part of Imperial Germany. By age five, Hoffer could already read in both English and his parents' native German. He also spoke Hebrew. When he was five, his mother fell down the stairs with him in her arms. He later recalled, "I lost my sight at the age of seven. Two years before, my mother and I fell down a flight of stairs. She did not recover and died in that second year after the fall. I lost my sight and, for a time, my memory." Hoffer spoke with a pronounced German accent all his life, and spoke the language fluently. He was raised by a live-in relative or servant, a German immigrant named Martha. His eyesight inexplicably returned when he was 15. Fearing he might lose it again, he seized on the opportunity to read as much as he could. His recovery proved permanent, but Hoffer never abandoned his reading habit.

Hoffer was a young man when he also lost his father. The cabinetmaker's union paid for Knut Hoffer's funeral and gave Hoffer about $300 insurance money. He took a bus to Los Angeles and spent the next 10 years wandering, as he remembered, "up and down the land, dodging hunger and grieving over the world." Hoffer eventually landed on Skid Row, reading, occasionally writing, and working at odd jobs.

In 1931, he considered suicide by drinking a solution of oxalic acid, but he could not bring himself to do it. He left Skid Row and became a migrant worker, following the harvests in California. He acquired a library card where he worked, dividing his time "between the books and the brothels." He also prospected for gold in the mountains. Snowed in for the winter, he read the Essays by Michel de Montaigne. Montaigne impressed Hoffer deeply, and Hoffer often made reference to him. He also developed a respect for America's underclass, which he said was "lumpy with talent."

== Career ==
He wrote a novel, Four Years in Young Hank's Life, and a novella, Chance and Mr. Kunze, both partly autobiographical. He also penned a long article based on his experiences in a federal work camp, "Tramps and Pioneers." It was never published, but a truncated version appeared in Harper's Magazine after he became well known.

Hoffer tried to enlist in the U.S. Army at age 40 during World War II, but he was rejected due to a hernia. Instead, he began work as a longshoreman on the docks of San Francisco in 1943. At the same time, he began to write seriously.

Hoffer left the docks in 1964, and shortly after became an adjunct professor at the University of California, Berkeley. He later retired from public life in 1970. "I'm going to crawl back into my hole where I started," he said. "I don't want to be a public person or anybody's spokesman... Any man can ride a train. Only a wise man knows when to get off." In 1970, he endowed the Lili Fabilli and Eric Hoffer Laconic Essay Prize for students, faculty, and staff at the University of California, Berkeley.

Hoffer called himself an atheist but had sympathetic views of religion and described it as a positive force.

He died at his home in San Francisco in 1983 at the age of 80.

== Working-class roots ==
Hoffer was influenced by his modest roots and working-class surroundings, seeing in it vast human potential. In a letter to Margaret Anderson in 1941, he wrote: "My writing is done in railroad yards while waiting for a freight, in the fields while waiting for a truck, and at noon after lunch. Towns are too distracting." He once remarked, "my writing grows out of my life just as a branch from a tree." When he was called an intellectual, he insisted that he simply was a longshoreman. Hoffer has been dubbed by some authors a "longshoreman philosopher."

== Personal life ==
Hoffer, who was an only child, never married. He fathered a child with Lili Fabilli Osborne, named Eric Osborne, who was born in 1955 and raised by Lili Osborne and her husband, Selden Osborne. Lili Fabilli Osborne had become acquainted with Hoffer through her husband, a fellow longshoreman and acquaintance of Hoffer's. Despite this, Selden Osborne and Hoffer remained on good terms. A self-described longshoreman, Hoffer worked on the San Francisco waterfront throughout the period in which his first books appeared.

Hoffer referred to Eric Osborne as his son or godson. Lili Fabilli Osborne died in 2010 at the age of 93. Prior to her death, Osborne was the executor of Hoffer's estate, and vigorously controlled the rights to his intellectual property.

In his 2012 book Eric Hoffer: The Longshoreman Philosopher, journalist Tom Bethell revealed doubts about Hoffer's account of his early life. Although Hoffer claimed his parents were from Alsace-Lorraine, Hoffer himself spoke with a pronounced Bavarian accent. He claimed to have been born and raised in the Bronx but had no Bronx accent. His lover and executor Lili Fabilli stated that she always thought Hoffer was an immigrant. Her son, Eric Fabilli, said that Hoffer's life might have been comparable to that of B. Traven and considered hiring a genealogist to investigate Hoffer's early life, to which Hoffer reportedly replied, "Are you sure you want to know?" Pescadero land-owner Joe Gladstone, a family friend of the Fabillis who also knew Hoffer, said of Hoffer's account of his early life: "I don't believe a word of it." To this day, no one ever has claimed to have known Hoffer in his youth, and no records apparently exist of his parents, nor indeed of Hoffer himself until he was about forty, when his name appeared in a census. Hoffer is said to have been entirely self-educated.

== Books and opinions ==
=== The True Believer ===
Hoffer came to public attention with the 1951 publication of his first book, The True Believer: Thoughts on the Nature of Mass Movements, which consists of a preface and 125 sections, which are divided into 18 chapters. Hoffer analyzes the phenomenon of "mass movements," a general term that he applies to revolutionary parties, nationalistic movements, and religious movements. He summarizes his thesis in §113: "A movement is pioneered by men of words, materialized by fanatics and consolidated by men of actions."

Hoffer argues that fanatical and extremist cultural movements, whether religious, social, or national, arise when large numbers of frustrated people, believing their own individual lives to be worthless or spoiled, join a movement demanding radical change. But the real attraction for this population is an escape from the self, not a realization of individual hopes: "A mass movement attracts and holds a following not because it can satisfy the desire for self-advancement, but because it can satisfy the passion for self-renunciation."

Hoffer consequently argues that the appeal of mass movements is interchangeable: in the Germany of the 1920s and the 1930s, for example, the Communists and National Socialists were ostensibly enemies, but sometimes enlisted each other's members, since they competed for the same kind of marginalized, angry, frustrated people. For the "true believer," Hoffer argues that particular beliefs are less important than escaping from the burden of the autonomous self.

Harvard historian Arthur M. Schlesinger Jr. said of The True Believer: "This brilliant and original inquiry into the nature of mass movements is a genuine contribution to our social thought."

=== Later works ===
Subsequent to the publication of The True Believer (1951), Eric Hoffer touched upon Asia and American interventionism in several of his essays. In "The Awakening of Asia" (1954), published in The Reporter and later his book The Ordeal of Change (1963), Hoffer discusses the reasons for unrest on the continent. In particular, he argues that the root cause of social discontent in Asia was not government corruption, "communist agitation," or the legacy of European colonial "oppression and exploitation," but rather that a "craving for pride" was the central problem in Asia, suggesting a problem that could not be relieved through typical American intervention.

During the Vietnam War, despite his objections to the antiwar movement and acceptance of the notion that the war was somehow necessary to prevent a third world war, Hoffer remained skeptical concerning American interventionism, specifically the intelligence with which the war was being conducted in Southeast Asia. After the United States became more involved in the war, Hoffer wished to avoid defeat in Vietnam because of his fear that such a defeat would transform American society for ill, opening the door to those who would preach a stab-in-the-back myth and allow for the rise of an American version of Hitler.

In The Temper of Our Time (1967), Hoffer implies that the United States as a rule should avoid interventions in the first place: "the better part of statesmanship might be to know clearly and precisely what not to do, and leave action to the improvisation of chance." In fact, Hoffer indicates that "it might be wise to wait for enemies to defeat themselves," as they might fall upon each other with the United States out of the picture. The view was somewhat borne out with the Cambodian-Vietnamese War and Chinese-Vietnamese War of the late 1970s.

== Papers ==
Hoffer's papers, including 131 of the notebooks he carried in his pockets, were acquired in 2000 by the Hoover Institution Archives. The papers fill 75 feet (23 m) of shelf space. Because Hoffer cultivated an aphoristic style, the unpublished notebooks (dated from 1949 to 1977) contain very significant work. Although available for scholarly study since at least 2003, little of their contents has been published. A selection of fifty aphorisms, focusing on the development of unrealized human talents through the creative process, appeared in the July 2005 issue of Harper's Magazine.

== Published works ==
1951 The True Believer: Thoughts On The Nature of Mass Movements. ISBN 0-06-050591-5
1955 The Passionate State of Mind, and Other Aphorisms. ISBN 1-933435-09-7
1963 The Ordeal of Change. ISBN 1-933435-10-0
1967 The Temper of Our Time. ISBN 978-1-933435-22-0
1968 Nature and The City
1969 Working and Thinking on the Waterfront: A Journal, June 1958 to May 1959
1971 First Things, Last Things
1973 Reflections on the Human Condition. ISBN 1-933435-14-3
1976 In Our Time
1979 Before the Sabbath
1982 Between the Devil and the Dragon: The Best Essays and Aphorisms of Eric Hoffer. ISBN 0-06-014984-1
1983 Truth Imagined. ISBN 1-933435-01-1

== Interviews ==
- Conversations with Eric Hoffer, twelve-part television interview by James Day of KQED, San Francisco, 1963.
- "Eric Hoffer: The Passionate State of Mind" with Eric Sevareid, CBS, September 19, 1967 (re-broadcast on November 14, due to popular demand).
- "The Savage Heart: A Conversation with Eric Hoffer," with Eric Sevareid, CBS, January 28, 1969.

== Awards and recognition ==
- 1971, May – Honorary Doctorate; Stonehill College
- 1971, June – Honorary Doctorate; Michigan Technological University
- 1978 – Bust of Eric Hoffer by sculptor Jonathan Hirschfeld; commissioned by Charles Kittrell and placed in Bartlesville, Oklahoma
- 1983, February 13 – Presidential Medal of Freedom awarded by Ronald Reagan
- 1985, September 17 – Skygate unveiling in San Francisco; dedication speech by Eric Sevareid

== See also ==
- American philosophy
- List of American philosophers
- Ivan Ilyin
- Eric Voegelin
