= Mark N. Katz =

American political scientist

- Born: November 11, 1954 (age 71); Riverside, California
- Occupation: Professor
- Years active: 1988 - present
- Title: Professor Emeritus of Government and Politics
- Board member of: Scientific Advisory Council (Finnish Institute of International Affairs)

Academic background
- Education: MIT (Ph.D.); Johns Hopkins (M.A.); UC Riverside (B.A.)

Academic work
- Discipline: Russian politics, Foreign policy
- Sub-discipline: War on Terror
- Institutions: George Mason University
- Website: https://schar.gmu.edu/profiles/mkatz

Mark N. Katz (born November 11, 1954) is a professor emeritus of government and politics at George Mason University Schar School of Policy and Government in Fairfax, Virginia, United States, and a nonresident senior fellow at the Atlantic Council in Washington, DC. He researches and teaches classes about Russian politics and foreign policy, revolution, and the "war on terror".

== Early life ==
Mark Norman Katz was born in Riverside, California, on November 11, 1954. He is the son of Norman Nathan Katz and Eithne Dolores Dorney. After attending primary and secondary school in Riverside, he earned a B.A. in international relations at the University of California, Riverside in June 1976. He then earned an M.A. in international relations from the Johns Hopkins University School of Advanced International Studies in May 1978, and a Ph.D. in political science from the Massachusetts Institute of Technology in February 1982.

== Professional life ==
Katz held pre-doctoral fellowships from the Institute for the Study of World Politics, the Earhart Foundation, and the Brookings Institution. A revised version of his Ph.D. dissertation became his first book: The Third World in Soviet Military Thought.

After serving on a temporary appointment as a Soviet Affairs Analyst at the U.S. Department of State in 1982, Katz won a 27-month post-doctoral fellowship from the Rockefeller Foundation, which lasted until 1984. This, plus a subsequent post-doctoral scholarship in 1985 from the Kennan Institute enabled him to write his second book, Russia and Arabia: Soviet Foreign Policy toward the Arabian Peninsula

From 1985 through 1988, Katz worked as an adjunct professor at the American University School of International Service (Spring 1985); a research associate (a staff position) at the Kennan Institute (September 1985–May 1987); an adjunct professor at the Georgetown University Department of Government and Russian Area Studies Program (Spring 1986–Fall 1987); and a consultant to various organizations (May 1987–August 1988). In September 1988, he became an assistant professor of government and politics at George Mason University, and became a full professor in September 1998.

He was a Jennings Randolph Peace Fellow at the United States Institute of Peace in Washington, DC from June 1989 to May 1990, and edited the book Soviet-American Conflict Resolution in the Third World. He was also awarded a United States Institute of Peace grant for the 1994–95 academic year. This, along with a National Endowment for the Humanities stipend (Summer 1995) resulted in another book, Revolutions and Revolutionary Waves.

With the support of an Earhart Foundation Fellowship Research Grant (Summer 1997) and a sabbatical from George Mason University (Spring 1998), he wrote yet another book, Reflections on Revolutions.

His latest book is entitled Leaving without Losing: The War on Terror after Iraq and Afghanistan.

He was a visiting senior fellow at the Finnish Institute of International Affairs (April–September 2017), a Fulbright Scholar at the School of Oriental and African Studies (January–March 2018), and a Sir William Luce Fellow at Durham University (April–June 2018).

== Bibliography ==
- Leaving without Losing: The War on Terror after Iraq and Afghanistan (Johns Hopkins University Press, 2012).] Leaving without Losing | Hopkins Press
- Editor, Revolution: International Dimensions (CQ Press, 2001).https://us.sagepub.com/en-us/nam/revolution/book236142
- Reflections on Revolutions (St. Martin's Press/Macmillan, 1999).
- Revolutions and Revolutionary Waves (St. Martin's Press/Macmillan, 1997).
- Editor, Soviet-American Conflict Resolution in the Third World (United States Institute of Peace Press, 1991).
- Editor, The USSR and Marxist Revolutions in the Third World (Cambridge University Press/Woodrow Wilson International Center for Scholars, 1990).https://www.cambridge.org/US/academic/subjects/politics-international-relations/international-relations-and-international-organisations/ussr-and-marxist-revolutions-third-world
- Gorbachev's Military Policy in the Third World (Praeger/Center for Strategic and International Studies, 1989).https://www.abc-clio.com/Praeger/product.aspx?pc=C8352C
- Russia and Arabia: Soviet Foreign Policy toward the Arabian Peninsula (Johns Hopkins University Press, 1986).
- The Third World in Soviet Military Thought (Croom Helm/Johns Hopkins University Press, 1982) ISBN 0709915160

== See also ==
- Revolutionary wave
