= Crane Brinton =

American historian of France (1898–1968)

- Born: February 2, 1898; Winsted, Connecticut, U.S.
- Died: September 7, 1968 (aged 70); Cambridge, Massachusetts, U.S.
- Education: Harvard University; Oxford University (D.Phil.)
- Occupation: Historian
- Known for: Revolution theory
- Notable work: The Anatomy of Revolution (1938)
- Awards: Rhodes Scholarship

Signature
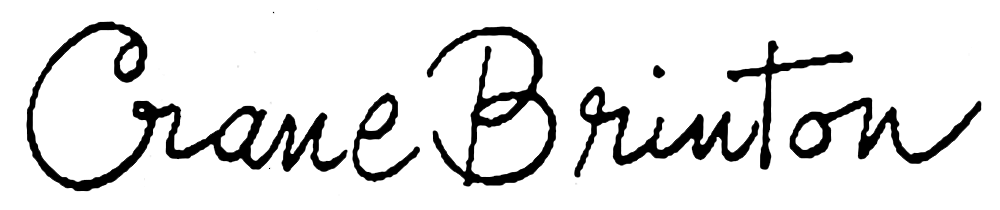

Clarence Crane Brinton (February 2, 1898 – September 7, 1968) was an American historian of France, as well as a historian of ideas. His most famous work, The Anatomy of Revolution (1938) likened the dynamics of revolutionary movements to the progress of fever.

Born in Winsted, Connecticut, his family soon moved to Springfield, Massachusetts, where he grew up and attended the public schools there before entering Harvard University in 1915. His excellent academic performance enabled him to win a Rhodes Scholarship to attend Oxford University, receiving a Doctor of Philosophy (PhD) degree in 1923 for a thesis on The political thought of the English romanticists, 1789–1832. Brinton then began teaching at Harvard University that same year, becoming full professor in 1942 and remaining at Harvard until his death. He was McLean Professor of Ancient and Modern History from 1946 to 1968.

For many years he taught a popular course at Harvard known informally to his students as "Brunch with Brinton". Brinton was known for his witty, convivial, and urbane writing and commentary, and was fluent in French. During World War II he was for a time Chief of Research and Analysis in London in the Office of Strategic Services. He was also Fire Marshal for St. Paul's Cathedral in London, which withstood the Blitz with minor damages. After the war, he was commended by the United States Army for "Conspicuous Contribution to the Liberation of France" and was chairman of the Harvard Society of Fellows in the late 1940s. Membership during that period included McGeorge Bundy and Ray Cline, who would go on to become quite influential in national security and intelligence.

In the early 1960s Brinton was the dissertation supervisor at Harvard of the young historian Will Johnston. He also served as an advisor for historian Elizabeth Eisenstein, author of The Printing Press as an Agent of Change.

Brinton was elected to the American Academy of Arts and Sciences in 1939 and the American Philosophical Society in 1953. In 1963 Brinton was elected president of the American Historical Association. He was also president of the Society for French Historical Studies.

On February 19, 1968, Brinton testified at the Fulbright Hearings on the Vietnam War as to the nature of the Vietnamese opposition, saying that Americans are sympathetic to a revolution but not a Communist one, and that if Ho Chi Minh had not been a Communist, "The whole story would have been different."

Brinton wrote a review of Carroll Quigley's book Tragedy and Hope.

Among those his scholarship inspired were Samuel P. Huntington, who cited Brinton many times in his book Political Order in Changing Societies, and Robert Struble Jr., in his Treatise on Twelve Lights.

== Works ==
Articles

- "Lord Acton's Philosophy of History." The Harvard Theological Review, Vol. 12, No. 1, January 1919, pp. 84–112. JSTOR 1507914.
- "The History of Paper Money to the War." The Journal of Modern History, Vol. 6, No. 3, September 1934, pp. 308–318. JSTOR 1871279.
- "Napoleon and Hitler." Foreign Affairs, Vol. 20, No. 2, January 1942, pp. 213–225. doi:10.2307/20029145.
- "Comment on Gay." American Historical Review, Vol. 66, No. 3, April 1, 1961, pp. 677–681. doi:10.1086/ahr/66.3.677
- "Many Mansions." American Historical Review, Vol. 69, No. 2, January 1964, pp. 309–326. doi:10.1086/ahr/69.2.309.
  An address presented at the annual meeting of the American Historical Association at the Sheraton Hotel, Philadelphia, Pennsylvania, on December 29, 1963.
- "Ideas in History." The Journal of Modern History, Vol. 37, No. 4, December 1965, pp. 464–468. JSTOR 1876860.

Books

- The Political Ideas of the English Romanticists. Oxford: Oxford University Press, 1926.
- The Jacobins: An Essay in the New History. New York: The Macmillan Company, 1930.
  A detailed account of the political radicals of the French Revolution. Reissued by Transaction Publishers (2012) with a new introduction: "Crane Brinton, The New History, and Retrospective Sociology," by Howard G. Schneiderman.
- English Political Thought in the Nineteenth Century. London: E. Benn, 1933.
- A Decade of Revolution, 1789–1799. New York, London: Harper & Brothers, 1934.
  A study of the French Revolution. Reprinted by Westport, CT: Greenwood Press, 1983, 1934.
- The Lives of Talleyrand. New York: Norton, 1936.
  A biography of Talleyrand with a uniquely favorable perspective.
- French Revolutionary Legislation on Illegitimacy, 1789–1804. Cambridge, MA: Harvard University Press, 1936.
- The Anatomy of Revolution. New York: W.W. Norton, 1938.
  A revised collection of lectures delivered in Boston at the foundation of the Lowell Institute in February and March, 1938.
- Nietzsche. Cambridge: Harvard University Press, 1941.
  A highly critical account of the German philosopher. Reprinted by Harper Torchbooks (The Academy Library) in 1965.
- The United States and Britain. Cambridge: Harvard University Press, 1945.
  Maps prepared under the cartographic direction of Arthur H. Robinson.
- From Many, One: The Process of Political Integration, the Problem of World Government. Cambridge: Harvard University Press, 1948.
  "Based on lectures delivered at Pomona College, Claremont, California, in March 1947 under the Joseph Horsfall Johnson Foundation."
- English Political Thought in the Nineteenth Century. Cambridge: Harvard University Press, 1949.
- Ideas and Men: the Story of Western Thought. New York: Prentice-Hall, 1950.
  An account of Western thought from ancient Greece to the present.
- The Temper of Western Europe. Cambridge: Harvard University Press, 1953.
- Modern Civilization: A History of the Last Five Centuries, with John B. Christopher & Robert Lee Wolff. Englewood Cliffs, NJ: Prentice-Hall, 1957.
- A History of Western Morals. New York: Harcourt, Brace, 1959.
  An account of ethical questions.
- The Fate of Man. New York: G. Braziller, 1961.
- The Shaping of the Modern Mind. 1963.
  An abridged version of his Ideas and Men
- The Americans and the French. 1968.
  An attempt to explain the often difficult relations between two longtime allies.

Book reviews

- "The Future in Retrospect: Spencer's Horrid Vision." Review of The Man Versus the State by Herbert Spencer. Foreign Affairs, Vol. 15, No. 4, July 1937, p. 768. doi:10.2307/20028812.
- "The Residue of Pareto." Review of Trattato di Sociologia Generale (The Mind and Society) by Vilfredo Pareto, Arthur Livingston, & Andrew Bongiorno. Foreign Affairs, Vol. 32, No. 4, July 1954. doi:10.2307/20031062.
- Review of The Napoleonic Revolution by Robert B. Holtman. American Historical Review, Vol. 74, No. 2, December 1968, pp. 627–628. doi:10.1086/ahr/74.2.627.
