= The Anatomy of Revolution =

1938 book by Crane Brinton

- Author: Crane Brinton
- Language: English
- Subject: Political science
- Publisher: Vintage
- Publication date: 1938, revised August 12, 1965
- Pages: 320
- ISBN: 0-394-70044-9
- OCLC: 296294

The Anatomy of Revolution is a 1938 book by Crane Brinton outlining the "uniformities" of four major political revolutions: the English Revolution of the 1640s, the American, the French, and the Russian revolutions. Brinton notes how the revolutions followed a life-cycle from the Old Order to a moderate regime to a radical regime, to Thermidorian reaction.

The book has been called "classic, "famous", and a "watershed in the study of revolution" and has been influential enough to have inspired advice given to US President Jimmy Carter by his National Security Advisor Zbigniew Brzezinski during the Iranian Revolution. (Note: Later books that used the same title in part include "Cuba: Anatomy of a Revolution" in 1969 by Leo Huberman; Portugal, anatomy of a revolution, London : Chartist Publications, [1976]; Anatomy of a revolution" : the JVP insurrection in Sri Lanka, 1987–1989, by SinhaRaja Tammita-Delgoda; Nehru Memorial Museum and Library. Centre for Contemporary Studies) It has been referenced in the well-known text Political Science: An Introduction by Michael G. Roskin et al.

A revised edition was published in 1952, a revised and expanded edition in 1965, and the book remains in print. Brinton summarizes the revolutionary process as moving from "financial breakdown, [to] organization of the discontented to remedy this breakdown … revolutionary demands on the part of these organized discontented, demands which if granted would mean the virtual abdication of those governing, attempted use of force by the government, its failure, and the attainment of power by the revolutionists. These revolutionists have hitherto been acting as an organized and nearly unanimous group, but with the attainment of power it is clear that they are not united. The group which dominates these first stages we call the moderates … power passes by violent … methods from Right to Left" (p. 253).

== Themes ==
According to Brinton, while "we must not expect our revolutions to be identical" (p. 226), three of the four (the English, French and Russian) began "in hope and moderation", reached "a crisis in a reign of terror", and ended "in something like dictatorship—Cromwell, Bonaparte, Stalin". The exception is the American Revolution, which "does not quite follow this pattern" (p. 24).

=== Fall of the old regime ===
The revolutions begin with problems in the pre-revolutionary regime. These include problems functioning—"government deficits, more than usual complaints over taxation, conspicuous governmental favoring of one set of economic interests over another, administrative entanglements and confusions". There are also social problems, such as the feeling by some that careers are not "open to talents", and economic power is separated from political power and social distinction. There is a "loss of self-confidence among many members of the ruling class", the "conversion of many members of that class to the belief that their privileges are unjust or harmful to society" (p. 65). "Intellectuals" switch their allegiance away from the government (p. 251). In short, "the ruling class becomes politically inept" (p. 252).

Financial problems play an important role, as "three of our four revolutions started among people who objected to certain taxes, who organized to protest them …. even in Russia in 1917 the financial problems were real and important" (p. 78).

The revolutions' enemies and supporters disagree over whether plots and manipulation by revolutionists, or the corruption and tyranny of the old regime are responsible for the old regime's fall. Brinton argues both are right, as both the right circumstances and active agitation are necessary for the revolution to succeed (p. 85–86).

At some point in the first stages of the revolutions "there is a point where constituted authority is challenged by illegal acts of revolutionists" and the response of security forces is strikingly unsuccessful. In France in 1789 the "king didn't really try" to subdue riots effectively. In England the king "didn't have enough good soldiers". In Russia "at the critical moment the soldiers refused to march against the people" and instead joined them (p. 88).

=== Background of the revolutionaries ===
Revolutions "are born of hope" rather than misery (p. 250). Contrary to the belief that revolutionaries are disproportionately poor or down-and-out, "revolutionists are more or less a cross section of common humanity". While revolutionaries "behave in a way we should not expect such people to behave", this can be explained by the "revolutionary environment" rather than their background (p. 120). "'Untouchables' very rarely revolt", and successful slave revolutions, like Haiti's, are few in number (p. 250). Revolutionaries are "not unprosperous" but "feel restraint, cramp, … rather than downright crushing oppression" (p. 250).

=== Revolutionary regimes ===
In each revolution a short "honeymoon" period follows the fall of the old regime, lasting until the "contradictory elements" among the victorious revolutionaries assert themselves (p. 91). Power then has a tendency "to go from Right to Center to Left" (p. 123). In the process, Brinton says, 'the revolution, like Saturn, devours its children', quoting Pierre Victurnien Vergniaud (p. 121).

==== Moderates and dual power ====
The revolutions being studied first produce a "legal" moderate government. It vies with a more radical "illegal" government in a process known as "dual power", or as Brinton prefers to call it "dual sovereignty". In England the "Presbyterian moderates in Parliament" were rivals of "the illegal government of the extremist Independents in the New Model Army" (p. 135). In France, the National Assembly was controlled by the "Girondin moderates", while the Montagnard "extremists" controlled "the Jacobin network", "the Paris commune", (p. 136) and the Societies of the Friends of the Constitution (p. 162). In Russia, the moderate provisional government of the Duma clashed with the radical Bolsheviks whose illegal government was a "network of soviets" (p. 136).

The radicals triumph because:

- they are "better organized, better staffed, better obeyed" (p. 134),
- they have "relatively few responsibilities, while the legal government "has to shoulder some of the unpopularity of the government of the old regime" with "the worn-out machinery, the institutions of the old regime" (p. 134).
- the moderates are hindered by their hesitancy to change direction and fight back against the radical revolutionaries, "with whom they recently stood united", in favor of conservatives, "against whom they have so recently risen" (p. 140). They are drawn to the slogan 'no enemies to the Left' (p. 168).
- the moderates are attacked on one side by "disgruntled but not yet silenced conservatives, and the confident, aggressive extremists", on the other. The moderate revolutionary policies can please neither side. An example is the Root and Branch Bill in the English Revolution which abolished the episcopacy, angering conservatives and established institutions without earning the loyalty of radicals (pp. 141–143).
- the moderates "prove poor war leaders" of the wars which accompany the revolutions, unable to "provide the discipline, the enthusiasm", needed (p. 144).

==== Radicals and "Reigns of Terror and Virtue" ====
In contrast to the moderates, the radicals are aided by a fanatical devotion to their cause, discipline and (in recent revolutions) a study of technique of revolutionary action, obedience to their leadership, ability to ignore contradictions between their rhetoric and action, and drive boldly ahead (pp. 155–160). Even their small numbers are an advantage, giving them "the ability to move swiftly, to make clear and final decisions, to push through to a goal without regard for injured human dispositions" (p. 154).

The radicals took power in Russia with the October Revolution, in France with the purge of the Girondins, in England "Pride's Purge" (p. 163). The American Revolution never had a radical dictatorship and Reign of Terror, "though in the treatment of Loyalists, in the pressure to support the army, in some of the phases of social life, you can discern … many of the phenomena of the Terror as it is seen in our three other societies" (p. 254).

The radical reign is one of "Terror and Virtue". Terror stemming from the abundance of summary executions, foreign and civil war, struggle for power; virtue in the form of puritanical "organized asceticism" and suppression of vices such as drunkenness, gambling and prostitution (p. 180). In its ardor, revolutionary "tragicomedy" touches the average citizen, for whom "politics becomes as real, as pressing, as unavoidable … as food and drink", their "job, and the weather" (p. 177).

On taking power the radicals rule through dictatorship and "rough-and-ready centralization". "The characteristic form of this supreme authority is that of a committee" (p. 171). The Council of State in England, Committee of Public Safety in France.

At some point in these revolutions, the "process of transfer of power from Right to Left ceases", and groups even more radical than those in power are suppressed (p. 167). (In France, the Hébertists are sent to the guillotine (p. 168), in Russia the Kronstadt rebellion is crushed.)

At least in France and Russia, the accession of radicals is also accompanied by a decline in political participation measured in votes cast, as "ordinary, peaceful", "humdrum men and women" favoring moderation find no outlet for their political beliefs (pp. 153–154).

Along with centralization, lethal force in suppression of opposition, rule by committee, radical policies include the spreading of "the gospel of their revolution" to other countries. This is found not only in the Russian and French revolutions, but even seventeenth century England, where Edward Sexby "proposed to the French radicals" in Bordeaux "a republican constitution which was to be called 'L'Accord du Peuple'—an adaptation of the English Agreement of the People" (p. 193). These attempts seldom make a significant impact as the revolutionaries "are usually too poor, and too occupied at home" (p. 213).

=== "Thermidor" ===
The radical reign of terror, or "crisis" period, is fairly soon replaced by Thermidor period, a period of relaxation from revolutionary policies or "convalescence" from the "fever" of radicalism. Thermidor is named for the period following the fall of Maximilien Robespierre in the French Revolution, in Russia the New Economic Policy of 1921 "can be called Russia's Thermidor" (p. 207), and "perhaps the best date" for that period in England is "Cromwell's dissolution of the Rump" (p. 206).

The Thermidor is characterized by

- the "establishment of a 'tyrant'", i.e. "an unconstitutional ruler brought to power by revolution" (p. 207). The "'silken threads' of habit, tradition, legality" having been broken, "men must be held together in society by the 'iron chains' of dictatorship" (p. 208).
- restoration of many pre-revolutionary ways. In Russia this meant an abandonment of the Bolshevik's avant-garde stance against the institution of the family—formerly disparaged as "a stuffy little nest breeding selfishness, jealousy, love of property, indifference toward the great needs of society" (p. 224). The Bolshevik regime restored roadblocks to divorce (p. 225), laws against homosexuality (p. 226), and moderated its anti-religious, anti-Eastern Orthodox Church stance.
- reaction against Puritanism of the revolution. In England, the Restoration comedy that appeared after the revolution is now "a symbol of naughtiness" (p. 220). In France the post-revolutionary Directory era was known as boom time for reopened dance halls and swaggering jeunesse doree (p. 218). During the New Economic Policy in Soviet Russia advertising began to appear (p. 225), as did a new class of entrepreneurs known as the Nepmen who were reputed to be 'exceptionally vulgar, profiteering, crude, and noisy' (p. 221).
- the replacement of "missionary spirit" to spread revolution by an "aggressive nationalism" (p. 213). In England Cromwell reconquered Ireland and seized Jamaica. In France Napoleon created an empire (p. 213).

America did not have a proper Reign of Terror and Virtue, but "the decade of the 1780s displays in incomplete forms some of the marks of Thermidor", as evidenced by the complaint of historian J.F. Jameson that 'sober Americans of 1784 lamented the spirit of speculation which war and its attendant disturbances had generated, the restlessness of the young, disrespect for tradition and authority, increase of crime, the frivolity and extravagance of society' (pp. 235–236).

=== Lasting results ===
Brinton finds the lasting results of the revolutions disappointing. In France, the revolution did away with "the old overlapping jurisdictions, the confusions and the compromises inherited from, the thousand-year struggle" between Crown and feudal nobility. Weights and measure "that varied from region to region, indeed from town to town" were replaced with the metric system. Also gone was non-decimal coinage unsuited "for long division"(p. 239). Some antiquated practices were also eliminated in England (p. 239). In Russia, the Bolsheviks brought industrialization, and eventually the Sputnik space satellite (p. 240). Confiscated lands stayed in the hands of the new owners for the most part, redistributing land to many "small independent peasants" in France (pp. 241–242), and Puritan businessmen and clergymen in England (p. 242).

Remaining essentially "untouched" were day-to-day social relations between husband and wife and children. Attempts at establishing new religions and personal habits come to naught. The revolutions' "results look rather petty as measured by the brotherhood of man and the achievement of justice on this earth. The blood of the martyrs seems hardly necessary to establish decimal coinage" (p. 259).

==== Comparisons ====
Brinton concludes that despite their ambitions, the political revolutions he studied brought much less lasting social changes than the disruptions and changes of "what is loosely called the Industrial Revolution", and the top-down reforms of Mustapha Kemal's reforms in Turkey, and the Meiji Restoration or post-World War II MacArthur era in Japan (p. 246).

== Limitations of the theory ==
1. Brinton admits that 'revolution is one of the looser words'. Must a revolution always be violent? can it occur by consent, as in the UK general election of 1945? He is unsure.
2. He assumes that the US is 'a stable society in the midst of societies undergoing revolutionary change' … 'the US looks like a stable society in which a real revolution is highly unlikely'.
  This is disputed, then and later by, among others; Murray Friedman, Lee Edwards, Paul Craig Roberts, Bernard Sternsher, Mario Enaudi, Carl N. Degler, who wrote of the US civil war as a 'Second American Revolution' and of the Great Depression as a third revolution.
3. Brinton asserts that 'the Great Russian Revolution is quite over, finished'. Also, 'revolutions end in a return to an equilibrium … the stable Russian society should finally emerge … no longer in the midst of perpetual nightmare … abundance seems on its way in the 1960s'. Like most, he failed to notice the internal contradictions which caused the USSR collapse just 25 years later.
4. Brinton called his book 'A work of systematization still in its infancy'. There was 'a necessity for a more rigorous treatment of the problems involved …, wider uniformities will … someday emerge from more complete studies'.
  He admitted to a lack of objectivity; 'Absolute detachment is a polar region, unfit for human life.'
5. with reference to points 2) and 3) above, it is widely accepted that polities cannot always be on the rise in a stable fashion. see, for example, Ibn Khaldun Joshua S Goldstein; Paul Kennedy; William Shirer and Sakwa.

== See also ==
- State collapse
- Ideology
- Ideocracy
- Eric Hoffer
- Crane Brinton
- Power politics
- Revolutionary wave
