= Michał Zadara =

Polish director and designer (born 1976)

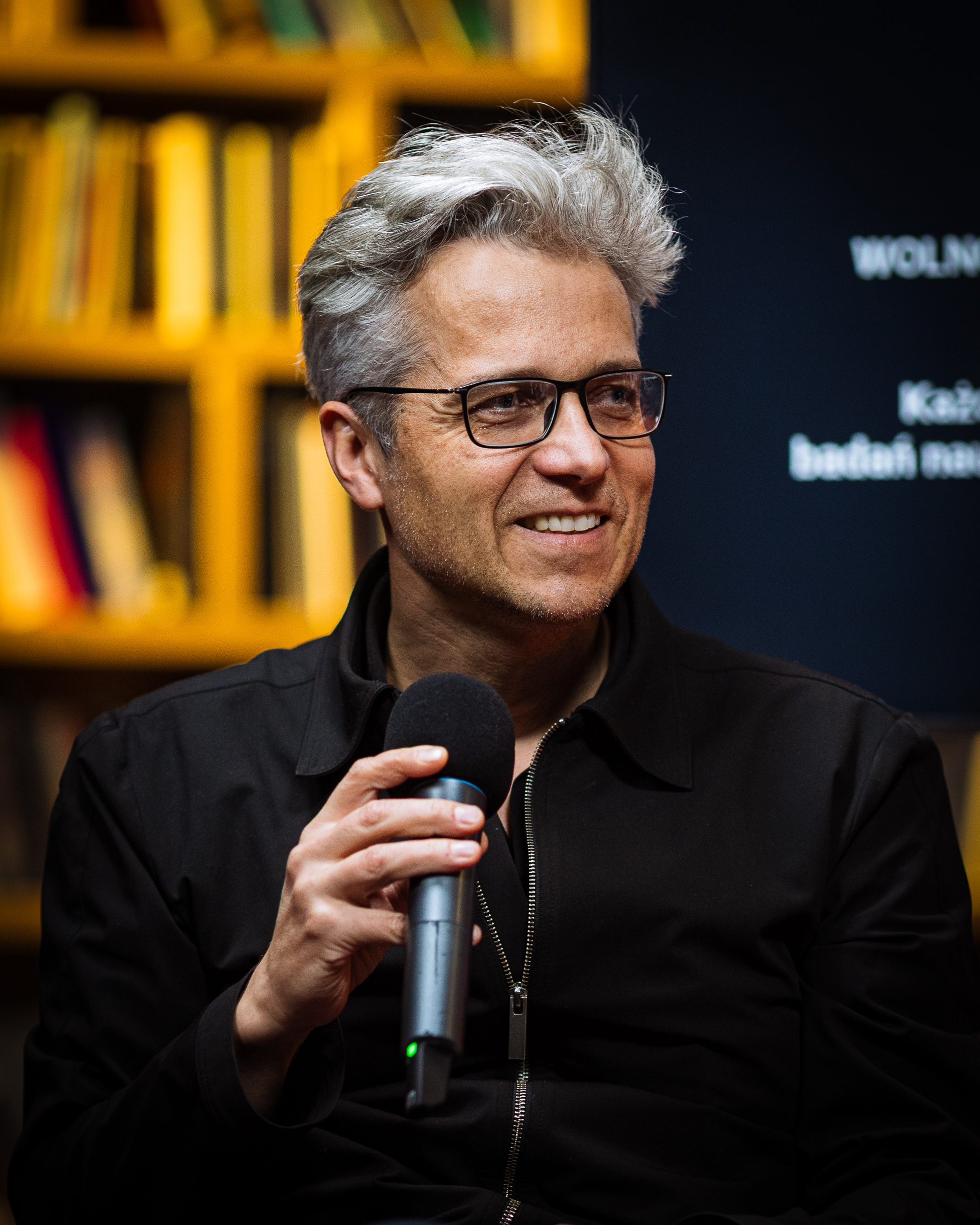
- Zadara in 2025
- Born: 19 October 1976 (age 49); Warsaw, Poland
- Education: Swarthmore College (BA)
- Occupations: Theatre director, set designer

Michał Zadara (born 19 October 1976) is a Polish theatre director and set designer. He has worked in almost every major city in Poland, and outside of Poland in Berlin, Vienna, Tel Aviv, New York and Philadelphia. He studied at the American International School of Vienna, and at Swarthmore College. He is best known for his faithful, yet vivid stagings of classic plays. He is the first director to have ever staged Adam Mickiewicz's masterpiece Dziady (poem) in its entirety.

== Early years and education ==
Born in Warsaw, Zadara left Poland with his parents when he was three years old and moved to Austria, and then to West Germany. He attended English-language schools. In 1994 he began studying Political Science at Swarthmore College, near Philadelphia. After two years of study, he took a leave of absence from Swarthmore, and studied directing at the Theatre Academy in Warsaw, and then oceanography at Sea Education Association in Massachusetts. Upon returning to Swarthmore he changed his major to Theatre Studies, and earned his B.A. with honors with a minor in Political Science in 1999. After his studies, he moved to New York, where he worked as a publicity assistant, theatrical carpenter and computerized-banking assistant. He also directed one show at the no longer existing off-off-broadway stage Collective Unconscious.

In the year 2000 he returned to Poland. After being rejected from the Kraków Theatre School, he worked as an assistant and collaborator of set designer Małgorzata Szczęśniak at Warsaw's Rozmaitości Theatre. In 2001 he was accepted and began studying at the Directing Department of the Kraków Theatre School.

== Theatre career ==
Since 2004 Zadara has directed more than thirty plays and performance art pieces at The Wybrzeże Theatre in Gdańsk, Stary National Theatre in Kraków, Współczesny Theatre in Wrocław, National Theatre in Warsaw, Współczesny Theatre in Szczecin, the Maxim Gorki Theatre in Berlin, the HaBima National Theatre in Tel Aviv, the Schauspielhaus Wien and a staging of Iannis Xenakis's opera Oresteia at the National Opera in Warsaw.

He was nominated for the Political Passport prize in 2006 and 2007, and was awarded this prize - the Polish equivalent of the Pulitzer Prize - in 2007. His 2007 production of Witold Gombrowicz's Operetta was presented in the 2009 Philadelphia Live Arts Festival.

In 2010, Zadara and his partner Barbara Wysocka created the much-discussed performance piece "Anty-Edyp", in which Wysocka, then 8 months pregnant, performed a version of Sophocles's Oedipus, while two doctors examined her heart and her unborn child's heart using USG. The images and sound from the USG created the visual and musical frame of the performance, as three musicians played the score, using the child's heartbeat as the basic rhythm. The text of was inspired by and included fragments of Deleuze and Guattari's Anti-Oedipus.

In 2011, Zadara created a theatrical installation of Joseph Roth's novel "Hotel Savoy" at the original Hotel Savoy in Łódź, in the building, where Roth's novel takes place - which was then still a functioning hotel. The spectators walked through the entire seven floors of the old building and its courtyard, while scenes and music were played simultaneously, so that no spectator could ever see the whole installation.

In 2013, Zadara co-founded CENTRALA, an independent organization that produces innovative art. In the following years, CENTRALA produced performances, exhibits, films and concerts. Centrala's innovative ways of production, creation, and presentation have resulted in collaborations with Warsaw's Modern Art Museum, the Warsaw Uprising Museum, and the Museum of the History of Polish Jews, among others. In 2015 with Pew Center support, Swarthmore College brought the North American premiere of Centrala's Chopin Without Piano, created by Zadara and performed by Centrala member Barbara Wysocka, to Philadelphia, with performances at Swarthmore College and FringeArts.

In 2014, Zadara began a three-year-long project at the Teatr Polski in Wrocław to stage the first ever full production of Adam Mickiewicz's epic drama Dziady. This text is one of the most fundamental theatre text in Polish culture, but has never been staged in its entirety. The full version of the play was presented in February 2016, and the performance lasted 14 hours.

In the 2019/2020 academic year, Zadara was appointed to the position of Cornell Distinguished Visiting Professor at Swarthmore College to teach a course on the contemporary staging of Greek Tragedy in the Theatre and Classics Departments. On April 24, 2020, his production of Sophocles's Women of Trachis opened at Swarthmore - the staging was widely covered in the press, as the play was performed without an audience and without actors.
