= Funerary urn from Biała =

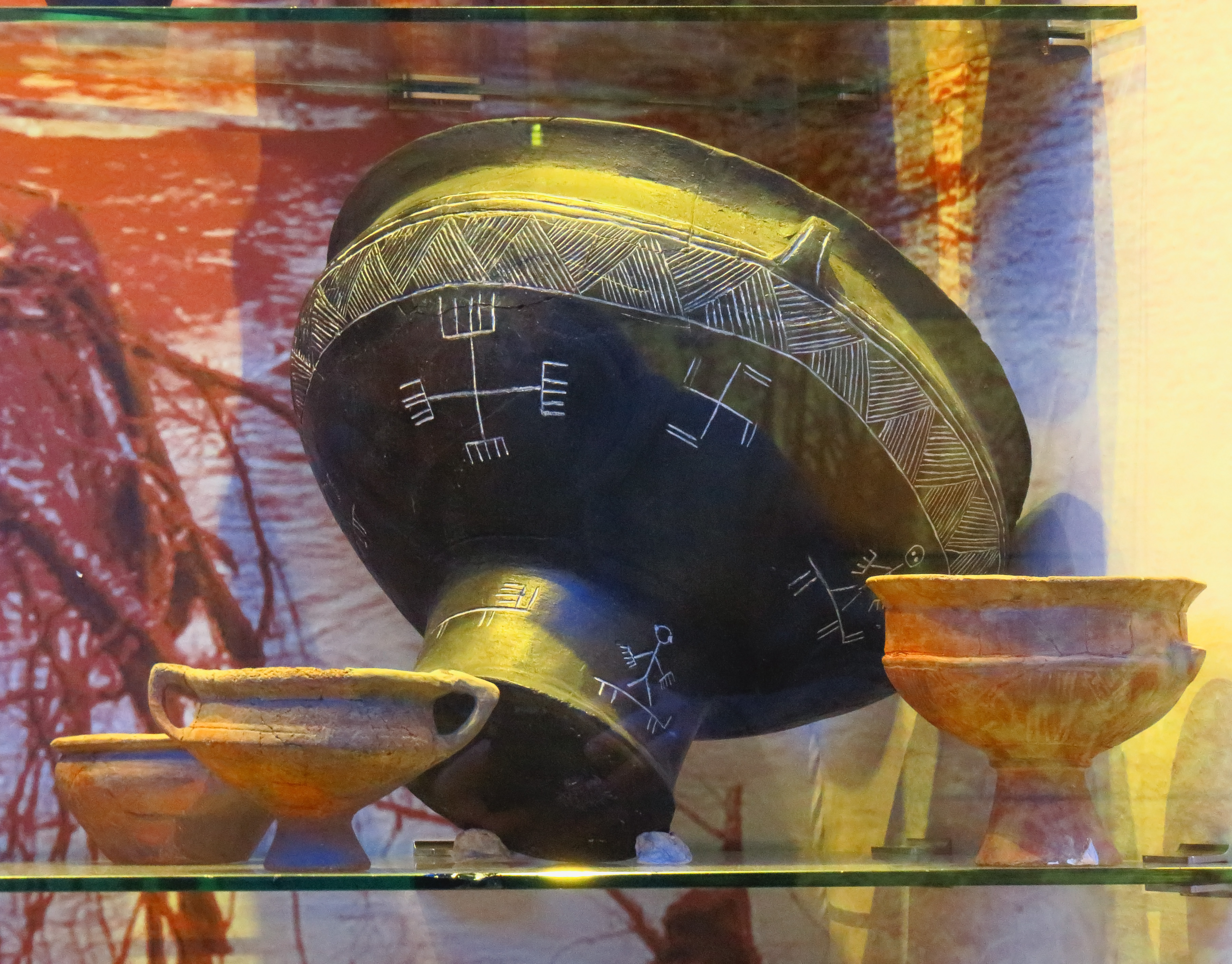
Replica of an funerary urn on display in Museum of Archaeology and Ethnography in Łódź.

Funerary urn from Biała (also: vase from Biała, urn from Biała) is a vessel found during archaeological excavations in the village of Biała in Poland. The vessel was used as an urn for the remains of the deceased. The funerary urn became an object of great interest because of the symbols on it, particularly the swastikas and two crosses, which are known today as the Hands of God. This symbol has been recognized by some rodnovers as a pagan, Slavic religious symbol even though its connection to Slavic culture has not been proven.

== History ==
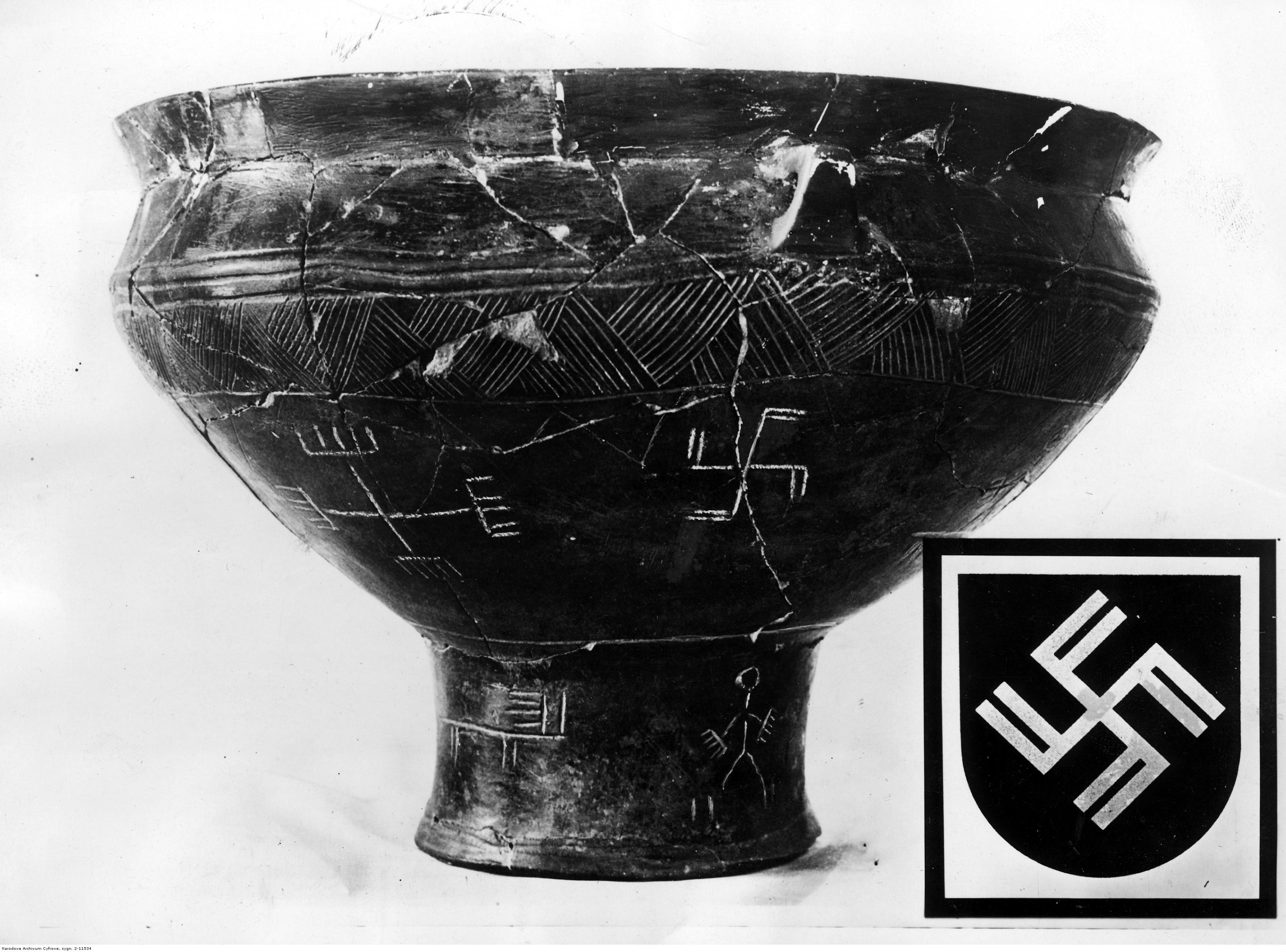
Picture of an urn from 1941 and the coat of arms of Litzmannstadt (occupied Łódź), based on the swastika from the urn.

The funerary urn was discovered in 1936 in a grave field in the village of Biała in the Łódź Voivodeship (then Brzeziny county) and is dated to the turn of the 2nd and 3rd century (Przeworsk period), less frequently a century older. The urn was found broken in a grave, possibly that of a woman, which may be indicated by a spindle whorl and a needle found in the grave.

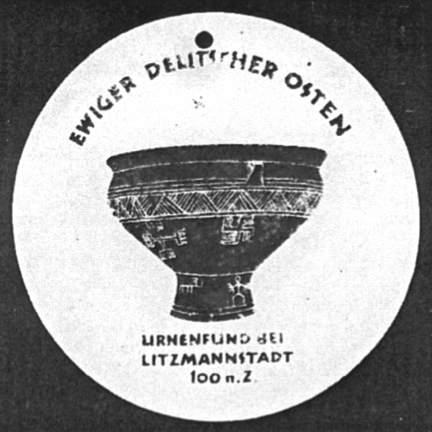
An funerary urn with the image of Hands of God on a 1942/1943 German medallion.

Coat of arms of Litzmannstadt (occupied Łódź). Colors of the coat of arms correspond to those of the Litzmann family.

During World War II, the vessel was used by the Nazis for propaganda purposes because of the swastikas on it. Its image was reproduced in numerous copies on posters, postcards and in newspapers, and the two-armed swastika became the emblem of the occupied city of Łódź. This propaganda was intended to confirm the Germanic origin of the Polish lands and to justify the occupation. The funerary urn was lost when the Germans withdrew from Łódź. It came back to Poland in the 90s and is now in the Museum of Archaeology and Ethnography in Łódź. The original is kept in storage and a copy is on display.

== Symbols ==
The German historian Walter Kersten published the vessel in 1944 in the journal Posener Jahrbuch für Vorgeschichte (Poznań Yearbook of Prehistory) because of the swastikas on it, where he discussed the pictograms on it. There are six drawings on the belly (the largest part of the vessel), which Kersten lists from left to right:

1. Swastika
2. Man on horse
3. Partially preserved or unfinished female figure, intended to be analogous to drawing 5, probably on horse
4. Man on horse
5. Woman mounting a horse with her dress and breasts clearly marked
6. A cross with comb-tipped ends that exactly matches the shape of the horsemen's hands, or four hands crossed; each hand has five "fingers"

On the foot there are:

1. Man on horse
2. Above mentioned cross or crossed arms with an additional four small swastikas between the arms; the upper arm has six "fingers"
3. Deer
4. Deer

Kersten then made a comparative analysis, giving one example of Roman period figural ornamentation from Germany, then ornamentation from Lusatian and Pomeranian culture, and, in his opinion, Scandinavian cave drawings from the Bronze Age analogous to the funerary urn drawings. He interpreted the drawings as a complex frieze depicting the solar procession and, based on an analysis of Germanic mythology, linked them with the cult of fertility. At the end of his article about the funerary urn he presented views with a chauvinistic tinge.

In 1946, in the magazine Z Otchłani Wieków (From the Abyss of the Ages), the vessel was also discussed by Halina Anna Ząbkiewicz-Koszańska, who worked in the City Museum in Łódź before the war and knew the vessel from her own experience immediately after its discovery. She writes that the fragment with the drawing, numbered 3 by Kersten, was damaged and could not be reconstructed. However, in the publication Inventaria Archaeologica (1960), also authored by Koszańska, the drawing is presented in a "corrected" form: the upper part is rounded so that the whole has a phallic shape, and two points suggesting eyes or breasts are drawn. Many later authors used this "improved" version without knowing it.

According to Konrad Jażdżewski, these drawings are pictographic signs that were supposed to record some event from the life of the deceased, as they depict a scene of deer hunters hunting. These could also represent one of the amusements waiting for the dead in the afterlife. Isosceles crosses and swastikas are symbols of the sun and were used to wish luck and as protection against evil – such may have been the intentions of the people who placed the ashes of the deceased in the urn.

Halina Anna Ząbkiewicz-Koszańska connected these drawings with Lusatian and Pomeranian culture, and Ewa Bugaj and Tadeusz Makiewicz with early Pomeranian culture.

=== Hands of God ===
Nowadays, the funerary urn from Biała owes its popularity to the drawings of crosses on it. The prevailing view in the scientific community is that the crosses are in fact crossed hands of hunters depicted on the funerary urn. Currently, this cross is known as the Hands of God (Polish: Ręce Boga) or Hands of Svarog (Polish: Ręce Swaroga), although such a name does not appear either in sources or in scientific studies. In the 1990s this symbol under the name Hands of God was officially adopted by the circles associated with Slavic Neopaganism as one of the religious symbols of the Slavs.

This interpretation was first proposed by Lech Emfazy Stefański in his book Wyrocznia Słowiańska (Slavonic Oracle) published in 1993, as well as in the statute of the Native Polish Church. According to him, the large central cross with arms ending in fingers (combs) is supposed to symbolise God Most High, as well as the universe and the balance that nature strives for. The swastikas placed between these arms are supposed to be attributes of Svarog and his son Svarozhits, or the divine causal element. Hands of God is also recognized as one of the religious symbols by another religious association that refers to the ethnic beliefs of the Slavs – the ZZW Slavic Faith, registered in 2009.

Although the relationship of this funerary urn to the Slavic culture has not been proven, similar symbols were found in the culture of the Slavs, e.g. as pysanka symbols collected by Kazimierz Moszyński from eastern Poland, Little Russia, and Serbo-Croatia, as a symbol on a child's funerary vessel found in the Voronezh Oblast, Kalacheyevsky District, or on a slate spindle from under the village of Savvinskaya Sloboda in Russia.

Hands of God on the belly

Hands of God on the foot with 6 "fingers"

Hands of God as a commonly used symbol with 5 "fingers"

One of the pysanka motives

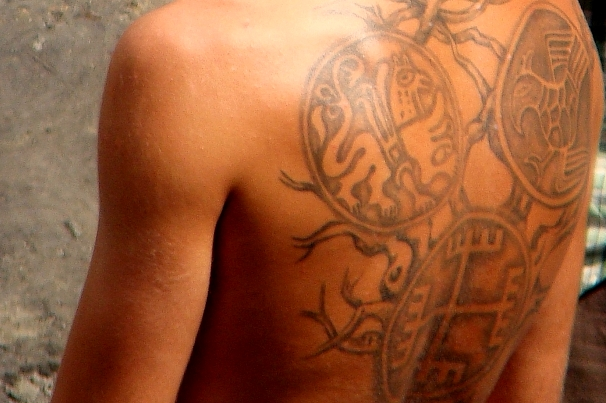
Tattoo

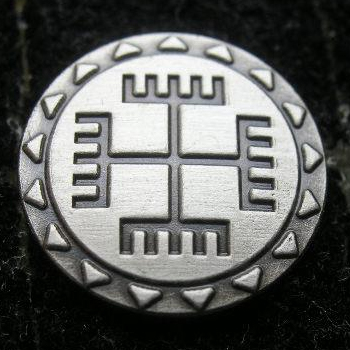
Decoration
