= Dziady (poem) =

Literary work by Adam Mickiewicz

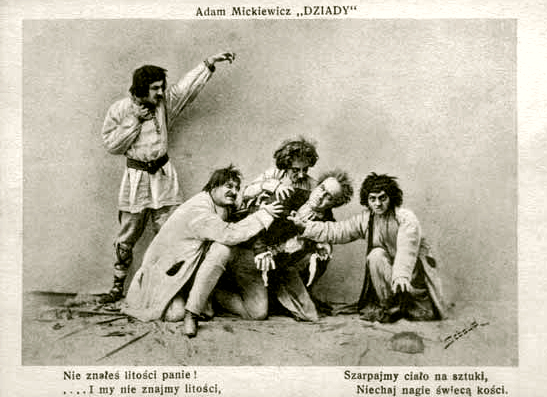
- A postcard depicting a scene from Dziady from a production by Stanisław Wyspiański at the Teatr Miejski
- Original language: Polish
- Written by: Adam Mickiewicz
- Subject: Dziady
- Genre: Verse drama and dramatic verse

Dziady (Polish pronunciation: [ˈdʑadɨ], 'Forefathers' Eve') is a poetic drama by the Polish poet Adam Mickiewicz. It is considered one of the greatest works of both Polish and European Romanticism. To George Sand and Georg Brandes, Dziady was a supreme realization of Romantic drama theory, to be ranked with such works as Goethe's Faust and Byron's Manfred.

The drama's title refers to Dziady, an ancient Slavic and Lithuanian feast commemorating the dead (the "forefathers"). The drama has four parts, the first of which was never finished. Parts I, II and IV were influenced by Gothic fiction and Byron's poetry. Part III joins historiosophical and individual visions of pain and annexation, especially under the 18th-century partitions of Poland. Part III was written ten years after the others and differs greatly from them. The first to have been composed is "Dziady, Part II", dedicated chiefly to the Dziady Slavic feast of commemoration of the dead which laid the foundations of the poem and is celebrated in what is now Belarus.

A ban on the performance of the play was an aspect of the 1968 Polish political crisis.

== The parts ==
The drama's four parts are described below in the order of their composition.

Part II

In this part, published in 1823, Mickiewicz expresses a philosophy of life, based mainly on folk morality and on his own thoughts about love and death. In the drama, Lithuanian peasants are summoning ghosts to ensure them the access to heaven. The first ghosts are two children who are unable to reach heaven (light spirits), as they have never suffered. Then appears a phantom of a cruel heir who is persecuted by birds (heavy spirit). They are obliged not to let him eat, because as a living person he did not act like a human being. The next ghost is a phantom of Zosia (medium spirit), a young, beautiful shepherdess. Her fault is that she had never returned anybody's love, and love is needed for the act of salvation. The final ghost resembles the main hero of the Part IV, Gustaw.

Part IV

Part IV, also from 1823, is believed to be Mickiewicz's manifesto of his romantic philosophy of life, and also a story about his love for Maryla Wereszczakówna. The main reason for associating bard's and his hero's biography is the resemblance of what Gustaw (the protagonist of the drama) says about his tragic youth. He met a fine girl, with whom he fell in love. Unfortunately, she married a rich duke and, subsequently, Gustaw committed suicide. A similar situation took place in the poet's life, but he managed to forgive his lover. When he was depressed, he wrote the IV part of "Dziady", one of the most beautiful Polish poems about love and also a fascinating example of the romantic poetry.

The action of the drama is divided into three episodes — the hour of love, the hour of despair and the hour of admonition. The book shows dangers of people's romantic nature and reading sentimental masterpieces, which do not show the real world. On the other hand, Gustaw is presented as an owner of the metaphysical knowledge. It is him, not his teacher who eventually notions to the philosophy of Enlightenment and visualizes the true picture of the world, which is the reality conducted by paranormal laws.

Part I

The first part, published after Mickiewicz's emigration to France, was probably written in the early 20s, though never finished. Meant to be a picture of "emotion of the 19th-century people", it was immediately given up by the author. It shows a young girl and boy, feeling confused with and trying to choose between the sentimental idea of love, adjustment to the society and respect to own nature.

Part III

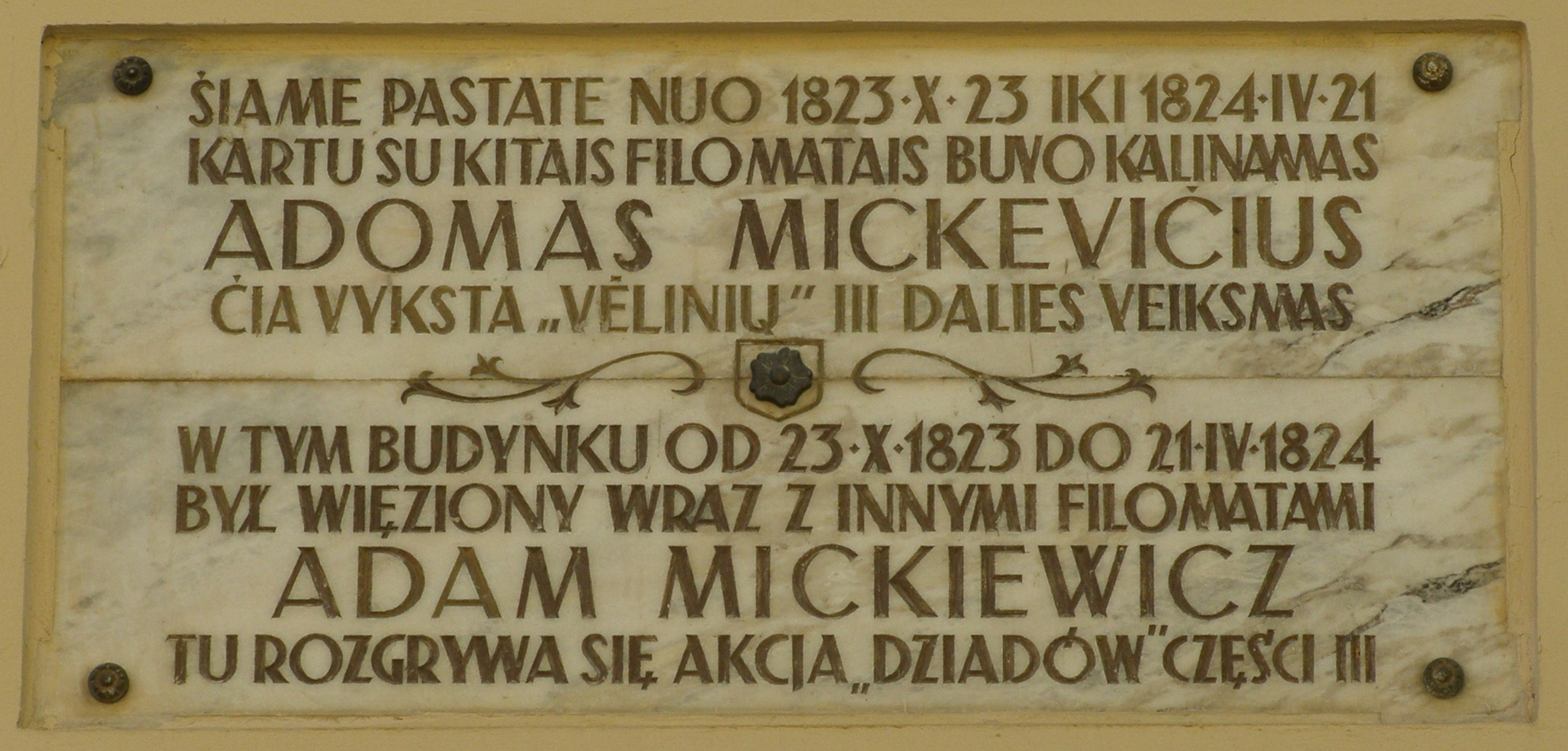
A commemorative plaque on the Basilian Monastery in Vilnius where young Mickiewicz was imprisoned between 1823 and 1824

This part, published in 1832, is thought to be the most significant one, or even one of the finest poems in the Polish literature. The main character bears a resemblance to Gustaw from the IV part, but he is no longer a "romantic lover". The drama was written after the failure of the November Insurrection, an event which exerted a huge influence over the author. In the Prologue the protagonist of the drama writes on the wall "Today Gustaw has died, today Konrad was born". Konrad is a name from the previous Mickiewicz's novel, Konrad Wallenrod. Wallenrod was the hero who sacrificed his life and happiness for his own country's sake.

Mickiewicz dedicated his work to people fighting for Polish freedom in the 1830s insurrection and especially to those who were exiled to Siberia by the Russian Tsar. The book describes the cruelty of Tsar Alexander and the persecution of Poles. It has many mysterious episodes; historical characters appear side to side with ghosts, angels and the devil. Poland, according to Mickiewicz's visions, was meant to be "the Christ of Europe": the national suffering was to result in the release of all persecuted people and nationalities, just as Christ's death brought salvation.

The characters of the drama are chiefly prisoners, accused of conspiracy against the Russian conqueror. The self-named protagonist is called Konrad. He is a poet. In his monologue, commonly known as "The Great Improvisation" (Wielka Improwizacja), he is talking to God about his patriotic feelings and personal misfortune. He compares his works of poetry to the creations of God and nature, and claims that they are completely equal, if not better. Frustrated, Konrad calls God out, accusing Him of letting people suffer — particularly him and Poles under the rule of three foreign empires, and yet still wanting to be called Father, worshipped and loved. The young poet thinks that Creator is baffled by his words and that man knows Him better than any of archangels, because he hears no response. He is ready to fight against God (comparing himself to Satan, but claiming that he will be the more challenging enemy, because, unlike his predecessor, in this battle he will use heart, not reason) for improving the fate of his nation and whole humanity. Meanwhile, angels and devils are struggling over Konrad's soul. Another character, a priest called Piotr, has also a vision. When he happens to foretell the country's future, he says one of the most mysterious words of the whole drama. Describing a person who will bring back the freedom of Poland, he says:

"The Son of a foreign mother, in his blood old heroes And his name will be forty and four".

The whole drama brings back the hope of Polish independence and gives a great picture of Polish society in such a difficult a moment. For instance, recognizable words are:

"Our nation is like lava. On the top it is hard and hideous, but its internal fire cannot be extinguished even in one hundred years of coldness. So let's spit on the crust and go down, to the profundity!"

== Interpretation ==
Dziady is known for its varying interpretations. The best known ones are the moral aspect of part II, the individualist and romantic message of part IV, and the deeply patriotic, messianistic and Christian vision in part III. Zdzisław Kępiński, however, focuses his interpretation on Slavic pagan and occult elements found in the drama. In his book Mickiewicz hermetyczny he writes about the influence of Hermetic, theosophical and alchemical philosophy on the book as well as Masonic symbols (including the controversial theory of Mickiewicz being a communist).

== Performances ==
A performance of Dziady took place in Kraków's Teatr Miejski (City Theater) in 1901, directed by Stanisław Wyspiański.

After the communist takeover of Poland, the new government discouraged the staging of Dziady. The first postwar production, a major cultural event, opened in November 1945, during the 1945-46 theater season, at Teatr Miejski in Opole. It was guest-directed by Jerzy Ronard Bujanski of Teatr Stary (the Old Theater) in Kraków, who also starred as Konrad.

Three years later, Leon Schiller began work on a production of Dziady at Teatr Polski (the Polish Theater) in Warsaw. The opening night was planned for December 1948, but was canceled for a number of reasons, some political.

The next production of Dziady in post-World War II Poland was staged only after Joseph Stalin's death and took place in November 1955 at Warsaw's Teatr Polski.

The first ever full staging of the Dziady was directed by Michal Zadara and was premiered on February 20, 2016. The performance lasted 14 hours and included six breaks. It began at noon and lasted until 2 in the morning.
