= Native Polish Church =

Pagan religious association in Poland

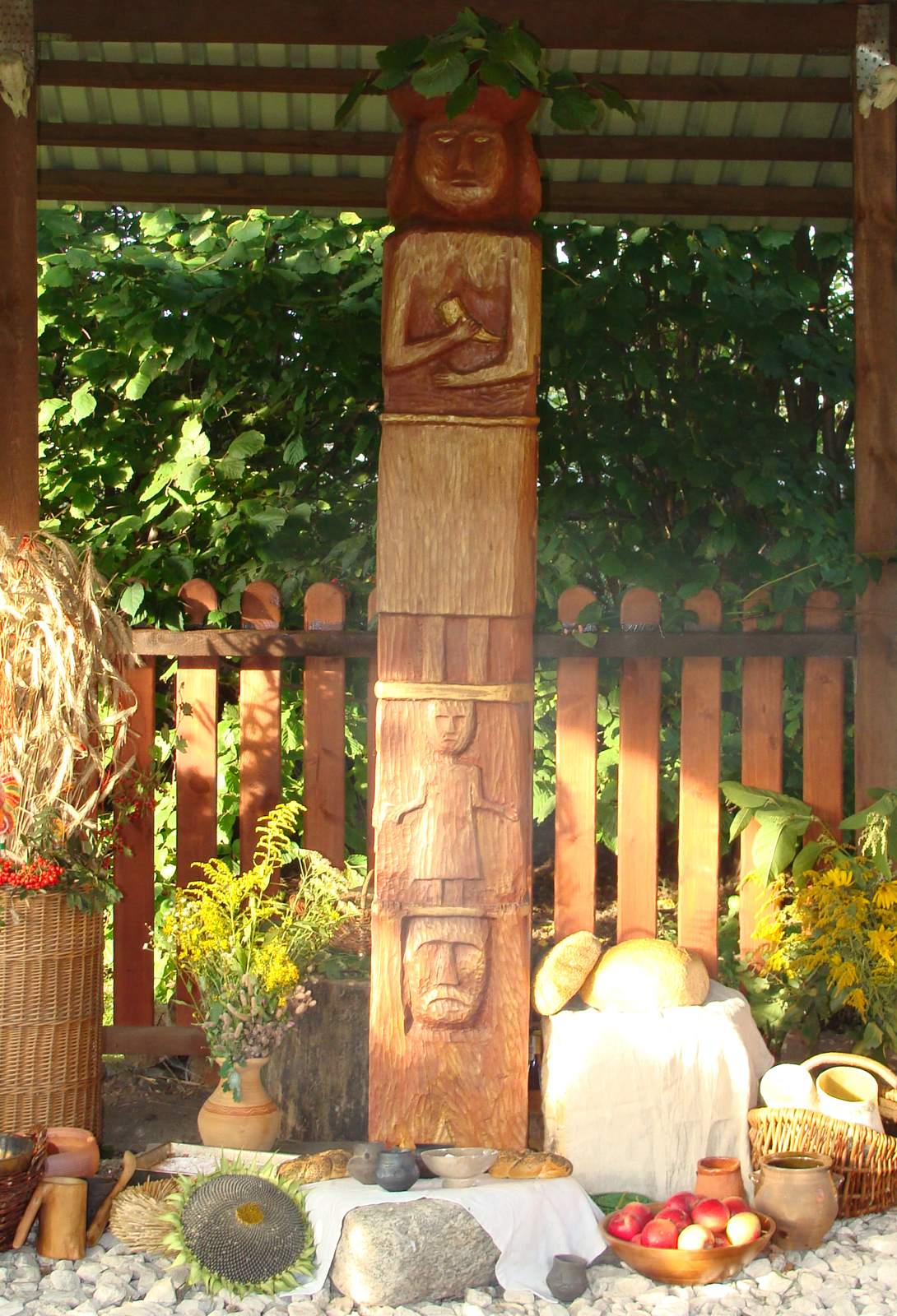
Harvest festival (Plony) at Chram (temple) Mazowiecki, RKP (2009)

Native Polish Church – theology

The Native Polish Church, or Native Church of Poland (Polish: Rodzimy Kościół Polski, RKP), is a West Slavic pagan religious association that adverts to ethnic, pre-Christian beliefs of the Slavic peoples. The religion has its seat in Warsaw, with local temples throughout the country.

In March 1995 the RKP was registered with the Polish Interior Ministry's registry of denominations and churches.

== Name of the association ==
The name "Native Polish Church" was inspired by the name of a church associating the descendants of the native peoples of America: the Native American Church. Likewise as the Native American Church, the Native Polish Church refers to the old, pre-Christian ethnic beliefs, while at the same time respecting all later-come religions. The term "Church" in the organisation's name is used solely to denote a religious organisation of believers and their clergy.

== Basic religious concepts ==
The beliefs of the Native Polish Church are on one hand based on the concept of henotheism, and a mixture of pantheism (or even panentheism) and polytheism on the other – i.e. the belief that fate is decided by a cosmic force known as the Highest God (identified by many Polish Native Church rodnovers as the Multiverse), whose various aspects (incarnations) are manifested in the form of other, minor gods. While officially the Polish Native Church recognises the highest god to be Świętowit, other names from the highest circles of the Slavic pantheon are commonly used (such as Perun or Swaróg); members of the Polish Native Church assume that the Highest God will always remain the highest deity irrespective of the name used. The god's true name (should there be such a name) will always remain beyond human perception. Members believe that the Highest God (in his pure form as eternal, infinite and unlimited absolute – in itself containing all reasons for existence) cannot be described in terms of good and evil, nor using any other human, subjective criteria. At the same time believers accept that these criteria (though to a certain degree) may be applied to minor gods and goddesses who dwell somewhat nearer to human existence. Other gods and goddesses (as simplified manifestations of the Highest God) watch over specific aspects of nature and are often synonymous with nature itself.

== Religious symbols ==
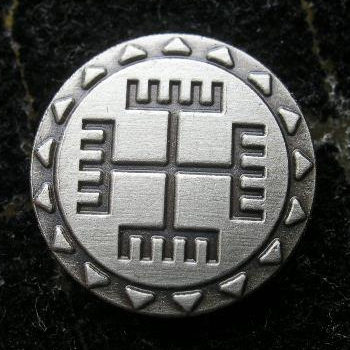
Hands of God

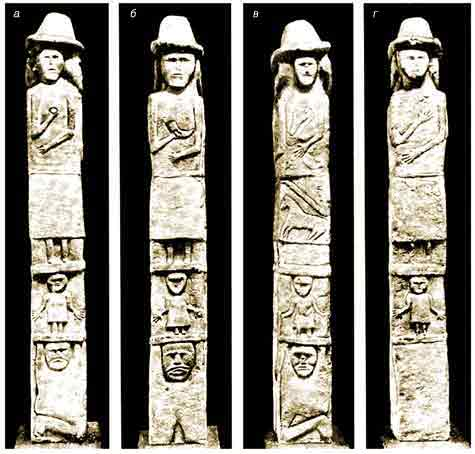
The Zbruch Idol

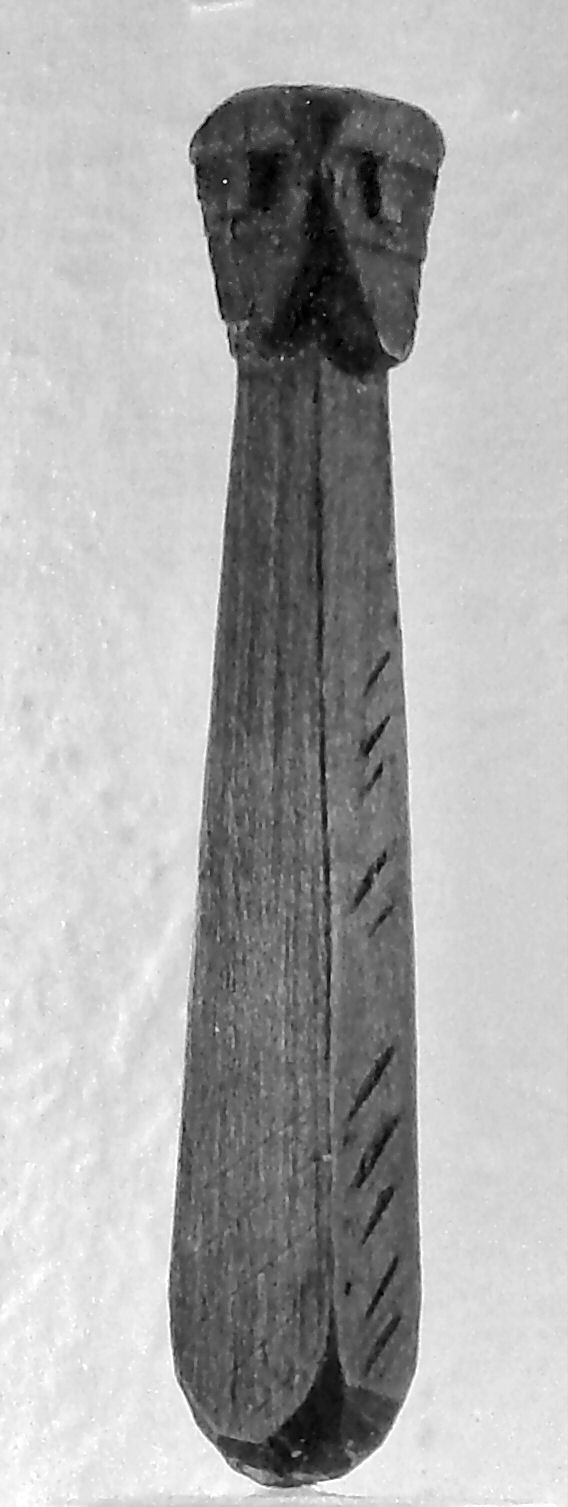
Świętowit of Wolin

The Native Polish Church uses three major religious symbols. These are

- the Hands of God (a graphic detail taken from a vessel found in Biała near Łódź), an ideogram denoting the Highest God as well as the universe and the cosmic balance towards Nature ever flows;
- the Zbruch Idol, an iconographic interpretation of among other things the universe as well as the image of the main pantheon of Slavic deities;
- Świętowit of Wolin.

== Main festivals ==
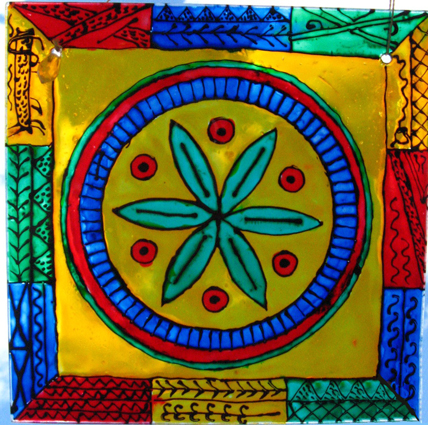
Kołomir – symbol of the cycles of life and the flow of time

Cyclic:

- Jare Święto – the Spring Festival, the Vernal Equinox – kindling the sacred fire, the ritual of drowning the Marzanna, decorating Easter eggs;
- Święto Ognia i Wody – Summer Solstice – kindling of bonfires, fire walking, ritual bathing;
- Święto Plonów – the Harvest festival, Autumn Equinox – blessing of crops and fruit, ritual feasting;
- Godowe Święto – the Winter Festival, Winter Solstice – inviting the Tree of Life into the household, ritual feasting called tryzna.

Other:

- Dziady

Occasional (family celebrations):

- Postrzyżyny
- Swaćba

The observation of the main cyclic festivals is usually carried out in public and open to everybody – guests from outside the community are welcome provided they respect the native faith and culture. The festivals’ rituals are performed according to suitable liturgy and conducted by either an ofiarnik or an appointed żerca.

== Ethics ==
The Polish Native Church recognises woman and man as part of nature (one of the creators of cosmic force) and as part of society. This obliges woman and man to obey the Laws of Nature and the Laws of Social Order – in the sense of observing universal rules of social conduct, common to most cultures throughout history. These rules prohibit murder, rape, burglary and theft, they also demand respect for human relations that organise social life from family to state matters. Nature is to be defended as sacred creation. While it is assumed that nature does not need any holy scriptures, be it books or regulations such as the Decalogue, to justify the sacredness of her laws, and to avoid multiplication of entities beyond necessity, as well as recognising that the ability of woman or man to think for her or himself and maintain a sense of empathy is vital – the association avoids formulating some of the most obvious rules into ready and "correct" ways of life. Ethics is usually limited to giving basic directions such as "live honourably and be a just man" or "do what thou wilt and harm none".

== Association structure ==
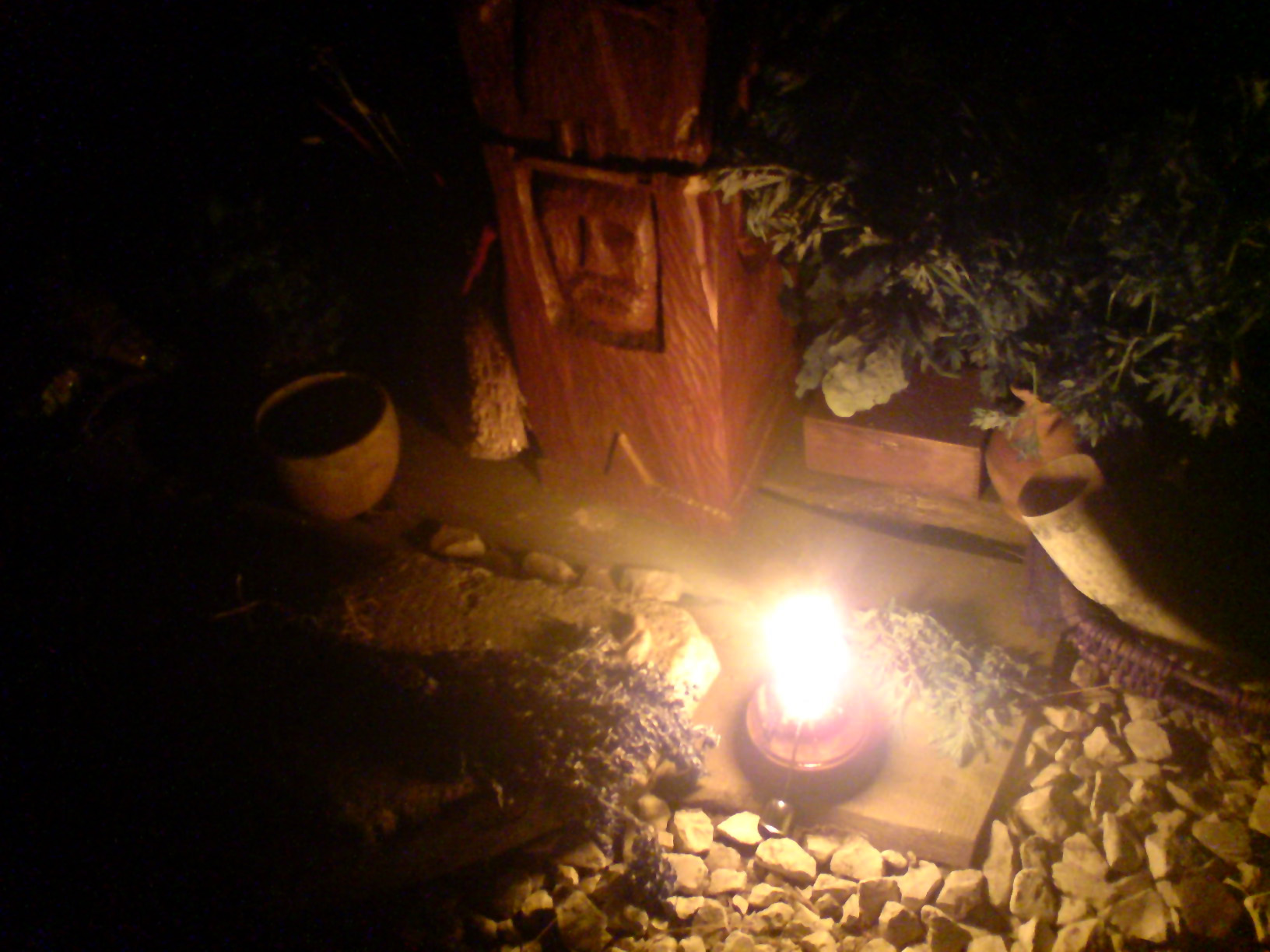
The Mazovian Chram (temple), Eve of Kupała (2009)

The Polish Native Church is an open church, without any claims of exclusivity in any sense – this regards both the individual's faith and his or her membership with churches or religious organisations. Members of the Native Polish Church insist that their Slavic ancestors were followers of the same God as the Christians and Muslims and others worship in their own special way. This means that one can be both a member of the Native Polish Church and a member of a different religious association (not necessarily pagan). Therefore, membership with the Native Polish Church does not require any formal act of apostasy from the candidate's previous faith. The only formal membership requirement is the filing of an appropriate declaration of accession that serves as a statement of creed.

As Slavic Neopaganism by definition describes its own territorial scope due to its visible ethnicity, the Native Polish Church does not find a verification of its candidate's descent to be necessary. It is assumed that anyone who feels Polish has the right to be Polish and it was in this very sense that the name Polish Native Church was founded. Indeed, the concepts declared in the founding act state that one may become a member irrespective of one's ancestry, because the vital elements of a nation are common language and culture. Although one of the requirements set forth in the declaration of accession is to present one's governmental Identification Card, it is possible to grant membership to a foreigner, especially one of Slavic descent.

The church is a religious association based on the principles of democracy. It declares an attitude of generous tolerance and objection to racism, Nazism and intolerance of other creeds, backgrounds and nationalities. All clerical positions within the Church are based on cadencies and elections. Membership is free.

== See also ==
- Slavic mythology
- Władysław Kołodziej
