= Dziady =

Slavic folk holiday

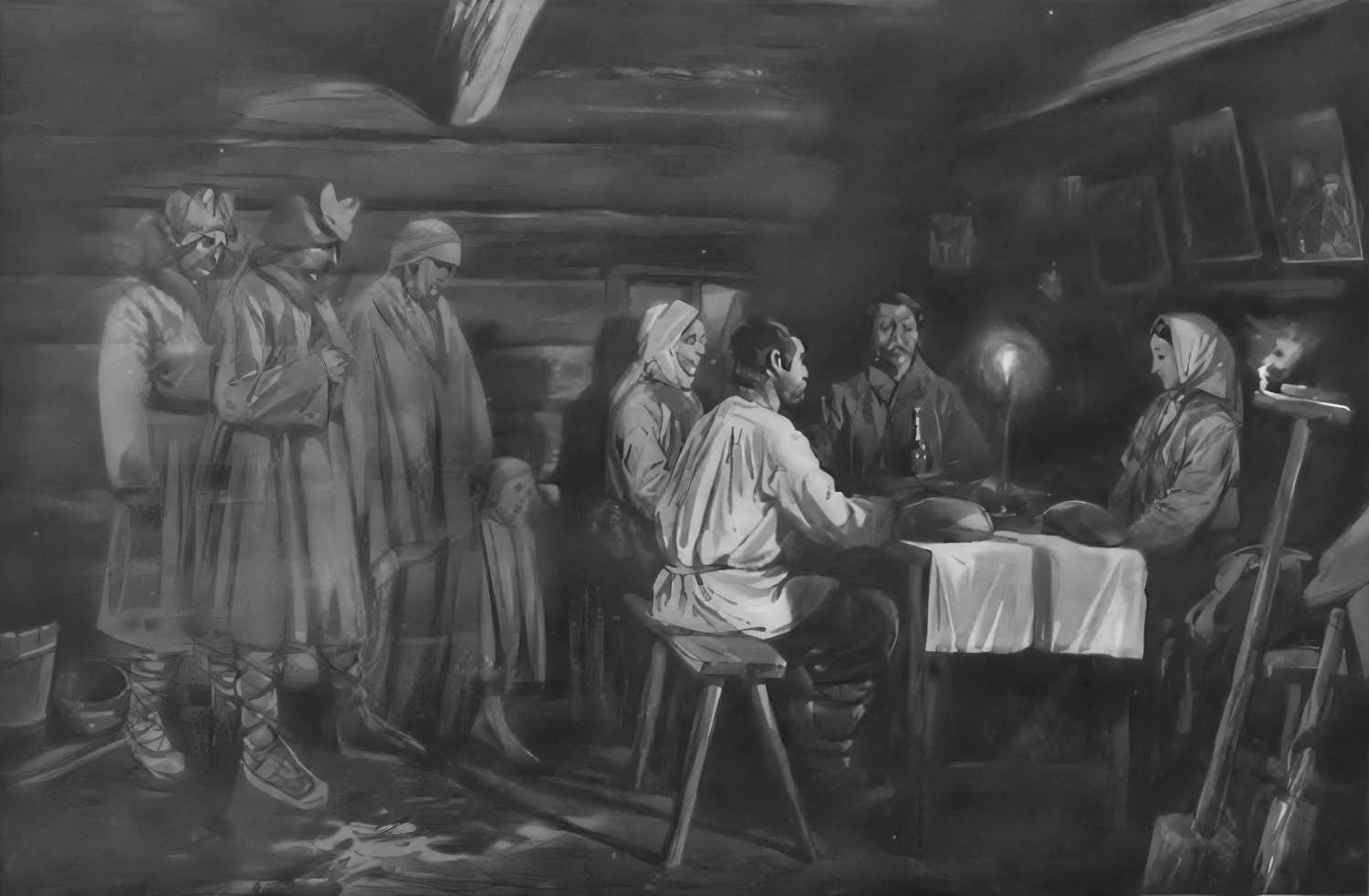
- Dziady, pradziady, przyjdzcie do nas! ('Ancestors, forefathers, come to us!'), a depiction of dziady ritual in Belarus, Stanisław Bagieński (1904)
- Observed by: Belarusians, Poles, Ukrainians, Lithuanians (rodnovers and Christians in christianised form)
- Type: Pagan, cultural
- Significance: Communion of the living with the dead
- Celebrations: Offering food to ancestors
- Date: Between the last day of April and the first day of May or around the spring equinox (spring dziady); Secondly, between the last day of October and the first day of November or around the autumnal equinox (autumn dziady)
- Frequency: Twice a year
- Related to: Zaduszki, Radonitsa, Vėlinės, Allhallowtide

Dziady (Note: Belarusian: Дзяды; Russian: Деды, romanized: Dedy; Ukrainian: Діди, romanized: Didy; Polish: Dziady; Lithuanian: Ilgės) (lit. 'grandfathers, forefathers, eldfathers') is a term in East and West Slavic folklore for the spirits of the ancestors and a collection of pre-Christian rites, celebrations, rituals and customs that were dedicated to them. The essence of these rituals was the "communion of the living with the dead", namely, the establishment of relationships with the souls of the ancestors, periodically returning to Earth to their headquarters from the times of their lives. The aim of the ritual activities was to win the favor of the deceased, who were considered to be caretakers in the sphere of fertility. The name dziady was used in particular dialects mainly in Belarus, Poland, Polesia, Russia, and Ukraine (sometimes also in border areas, e.g. Podlachia, Smoleńsk Oblast, in Lithuania Aukštaitija), and under other names (pomynky, przewody, radonitsa, zaduszki) there were very similar ritual practices, common among Slavs and Balts, and also in many European and even non-European cultures.

== Etymology ==
In the context of the pagan holiday of the dead, the most common name is dziady. The word dziad comes from the Proto-Slavic word *dědъ (pl. *dědi) meaning primarily 'grandfather', but also 'an old man with an honorable position in the family', 'ancestor', or 'old man'. The second meaning is 'spirit, demon'; compare Polish dziadzi ('demonic, of a demon') considered a euphemism from diabli ('diabolical, of the devil'), Kashubian dżôd ('evil spirit that threatens children, domestic spirit'), Czech děd ('domestic deity'), Russian де́д (déd) (dialectal; 'chort, domestic spirit'), Pskov, Smolensk: деды́ (dedý) (plural; 'ritual to honor the dead'), Ukrainian діди́ (didý, plural; 'shadows in the corners of the room, as at dusk' [colloquially], 'a day of remembrance of the dead', 'All Souls' Day'), Belarusian dzied, dziadý (plural; 'ritual to honor the dead, a day of remembrance of the dead, All Souls' Day'). Related words are associated with the second meaning, i.e. Proto-Slavic *dědъka: Russian де́дка (dédka) (dialectal; 'devil, chort, domestic spirit'), дедя́ (dedjá) ('devil', as in лесной дедя (lesnoj diedia) 'forest devil'), Proto-Slavic *dědъko: Russian де́дко dédko ('chort, domestic spirit'), Slovak dedkovia (plural; 'domestic deities, souls of the ancestors, guardian spirits of the house'), Ukrainian дідко (didko; 'chort, devil, impure/evil power') or Proto-Slavic *dědъkъ: Lower Sorbian źědki (plural; 'gnomes'), Czech dedek ('domestic deity'). (Note: Russian forms in accordance with Филин, Ф. П., ed. (1972). Словарь русских народных говоров. Выпуск 7: Гона – Депеть. Ленинград: Наука.)

== Dates ==
In the Slavic tradition, depending on the region, the feast of the deceased was celebrated at least twice a year. The main dziady were the so-called spring dziady and autumn dziady:

- Spring dziady was celebrated around 1 and 2 May
- Autumn dziady was celebrated on the night from October 31 to November 1, also known as All Saints Day, which was a preparation for the autumn day of the dead, celebrated around November 2.

== Rituals of the dziady ==
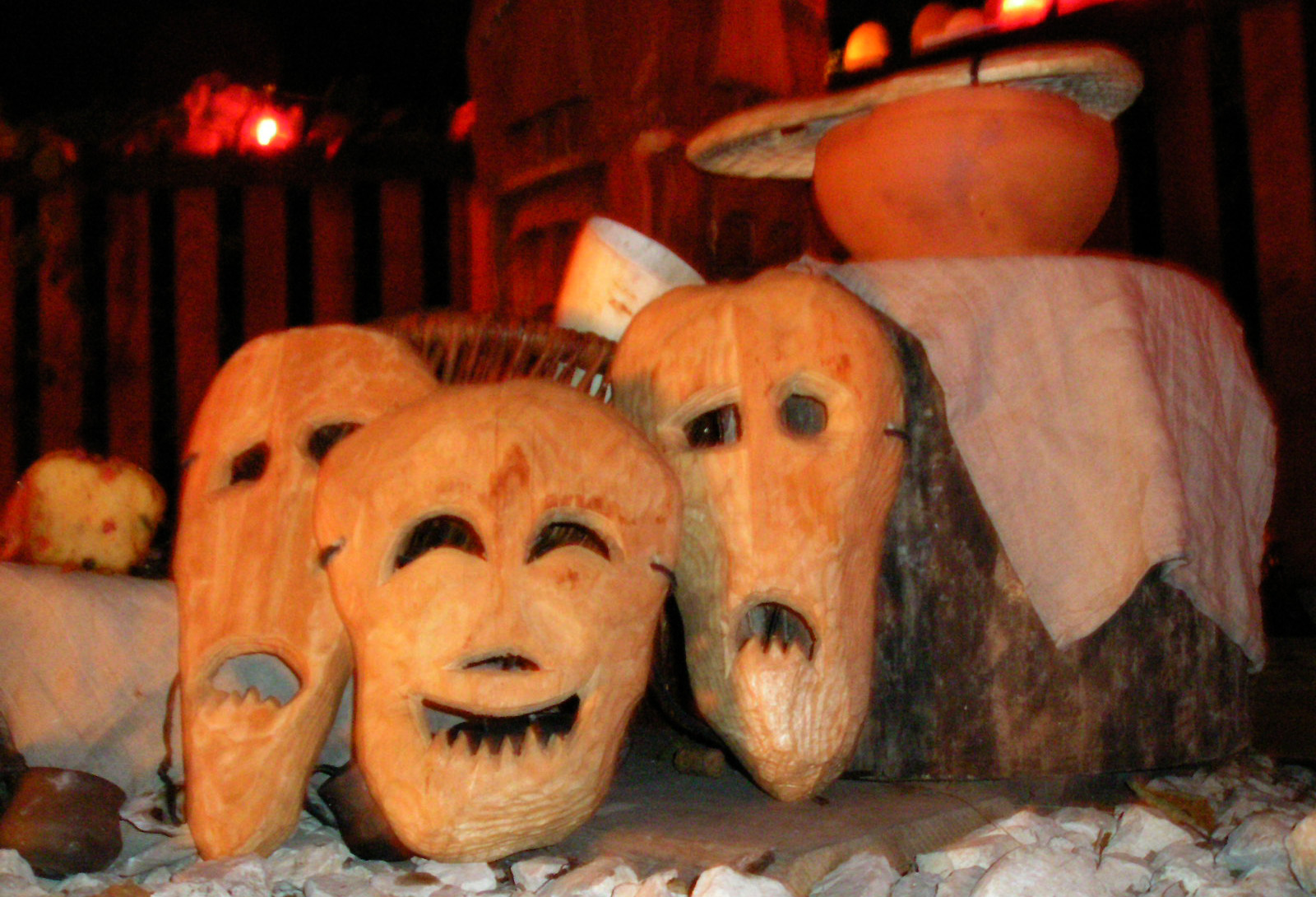
Foods for the spirits of the deceased and masks (kraboszki) symbolizing them – Dziady 2009, NPC, Mazovian temple

Within the framework of grandfather's rituals, the souls coming to "this world" had to be hosted in order to secure their favour and at the same time help them to achieve peace in the hereafter. The basic ritual form was feeding and watering of souls (e.g. honey, groats, eggs, forge and vodka) during special feasts prepared in houses or cemeteries (directly on graves). A characteristic feature of these feasts was that the people who ate them dropped or poured some of their food and drinks on the table, floor or grave for the souls of the deceased. In some areas, however, the ancestors also had to be given the opportunity to bathe (a sauna was prepared for this) and warm up. This last condition was fulfilled by lighting fires, whose function is sometimes explained differently. They were supposed to light the way for wandering souls so that they would not get lost and could spend the night with their loved ones. The remnants of this custom are contemporary candles lit on graves. However, fire – especially the one kindled on crossroads – could also have had another meaning. The idea was to prevent demons (souls of people who died suddenly, suicides, drowning, etc.) from being born, which were believed to have been extremely active during this period. In some regions of Poland, e.g. Podhale, in the place of someone's violent death, every passer-by was obliged to throw a sprig at the stake, which was then burned every year.

A special role in suffragette rites was played by beggars, who in many regions were also called dziady. This coincidence of names was not accidental, because in the folklore of itinerants, the beggars-dziady were seen as mediation figures and connectors with the "other world". Therefore, people asked them to pray for the souls of their deceased ancestors, offering food (sometimes special ritual bread prepared for the occasion) or cash donations in return. The passing on of food to beggars as part of soul rituals is sometimes interpreted as a form of feeding the souls of ancestors, which is confirmed by the fact that in some areas they were given their favorite dishes of the deceased.

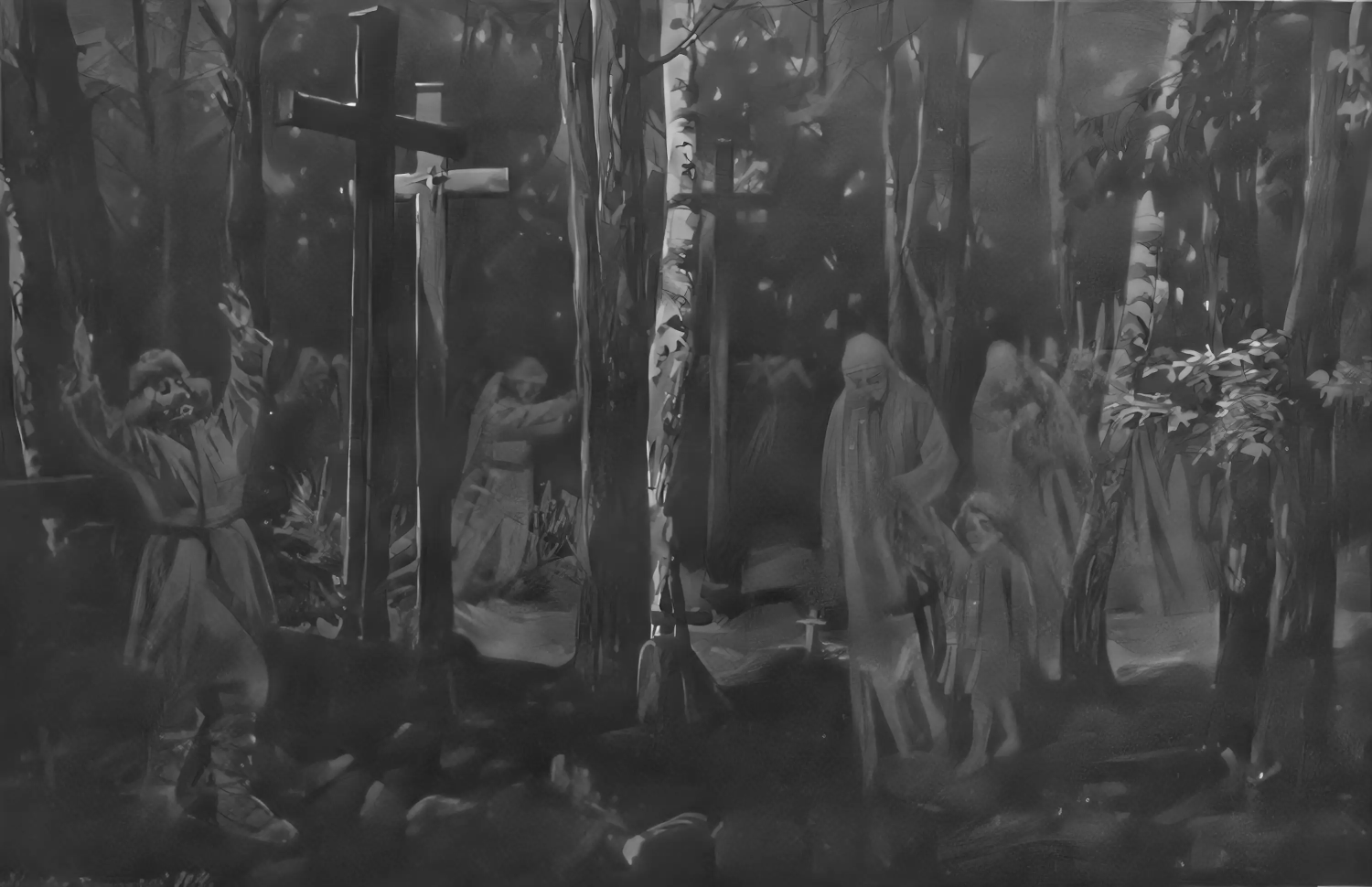
Cemetery on dziady's night. Stanisław Bagieński.

During this holiday, there were numerous prohibitions concerning the performance of various works and activities that could disturb or even threaten the peace of the souls on earth. The following were prohibited: loud behaviour at the table and suddenly getting up (which could frighten souls), cleaning from the table after supper (so that souls could feed), pouring water after washing dishes through the window (so as not to pour over the souls staying there) smoking in the oven (this way – as it was believed – souls would sometimes get home), sewing, weaving or spinning (so as not to sew or tie up a soul that could not return to "that world") or working on flax.

=== Rite in literature ===
The folk ritual of the dziady became an inspiration for the Adam Mickiewicz's Dziady, the central motif of which are the scenes of summoning souls during the village congregation, taking place in the abandoned chapel at the cemetery. The ritual is presided over by the Guślarz (Koźlarz, Huslar), who preaches ritual formulas and evokes the souls of the dead in purgatory. They are to tell them what they need to achieve salvation and to eat the food they have carried for them.

Ethnological and literary studies clearly show that in Mickiewicz's work we deal with stylization. The author took numerous elements from Belarusian folklore, processed them artistically and created an original image. In fact, the rituals of the dziady took place in christian times, either in houses, or in cemeteries by the graves of their ancestors, or in places connected archetypically (and often also locally) with former centers of worship – on hills, under sacred trees, in places considered sacred (sometimes actually by chapels, which were often built on former places of pagan worship). Mickiewicz's references to terms such as "purgatory" and "salvation" are the result of combining pagan and Christian customs.

=== Contemporary celebration ===
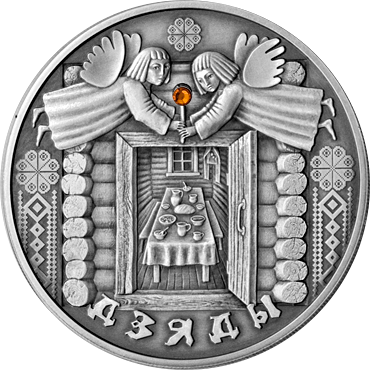
"Dziady", silver commemorative coin, denomination of 20 rubels

To this day, in Belarus, Ukraine, parts of Russia, and some regions of eastern Poland, it is cultivated to carry on the graves of the dead a symbolic meal in clay pots. The majority of Slavic neo-pagan and rodnover movements also cultivate the dziady. Every year in Krakow, a traditional Rękawka is held, directly related to the ancient custom of spring ancestors' holiday.

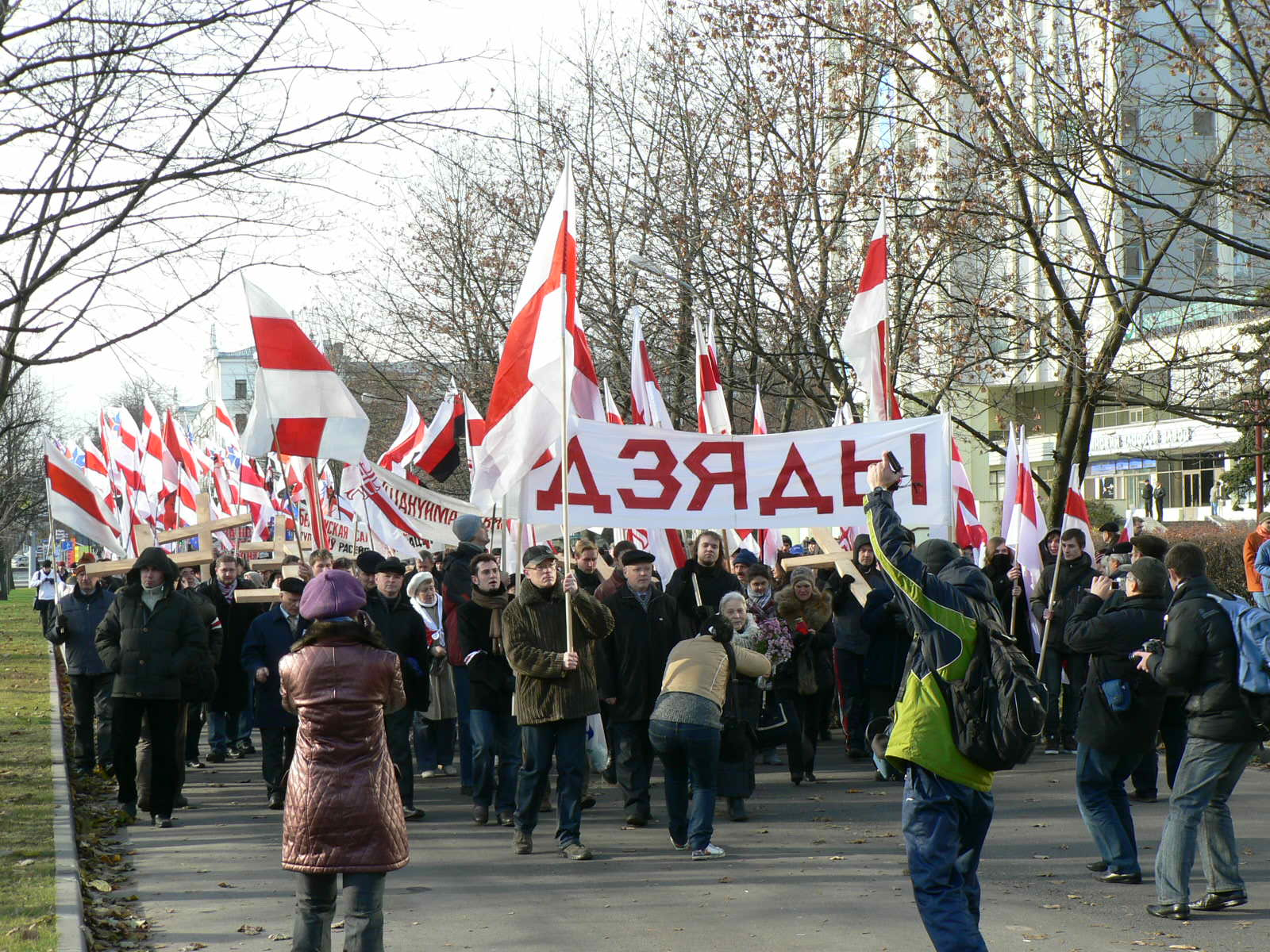
March to Kurapaty in 2009

In Belarus, dziady began to gain in importance in the late 1980s and were particularly important for Belarusian Catholics, for whom this day became a symbol of memory of the victims of the communist regime. On October 30, 1988, the first mass gathering was organized, not by the authorities but by activists, to commemorate the victims in 20th century Belarus. The authorities of that time, which did not like it, dispersed the assembly with the help of the militsiya. The dziady ceased to be a day off in 1996, when the holiday began to be associated with the democratic opposition. Nowadays, hundreds of thousands of Belarusians are taking leave on demand to honor their ancestors on November 1 and 2. In 2017, the President of the Episcopal Conference of Belarus, Tadeusz Kondrusiewicz, said that the dziady should be a day off from work, instead of the October Revolution on November 7. He also supported the Internet petition for granting the status of a day off from work to grandfathers, which has now collected over 2500 signatures.

== Dziady and Christianity ==
Christianity, on the one hand, fought against pagan rituals, successfully banning them, and on the other hand, it tried to adapt some of them in an attempt to christianize them. In the case of the dziady, both the Catholic and the Orthodox Church tried to marginalize and then eliminate pagan festivals by introducing into their squares (at the same or similar moments of the annual cycle) Christian festivals and practices (respectively, the counselor subots and the suffragettes). A different strategy was adopted in the Uniate Church, which obliged the priests to go with the rural population to their dziady and pray the Angelus, the Hail Mary and other Christian prayers. In some regions, the Uniate priests celebrated special processions at the cemeteries, during which they consecrated individual graves and collected food and money left on them.

== Gallery ==
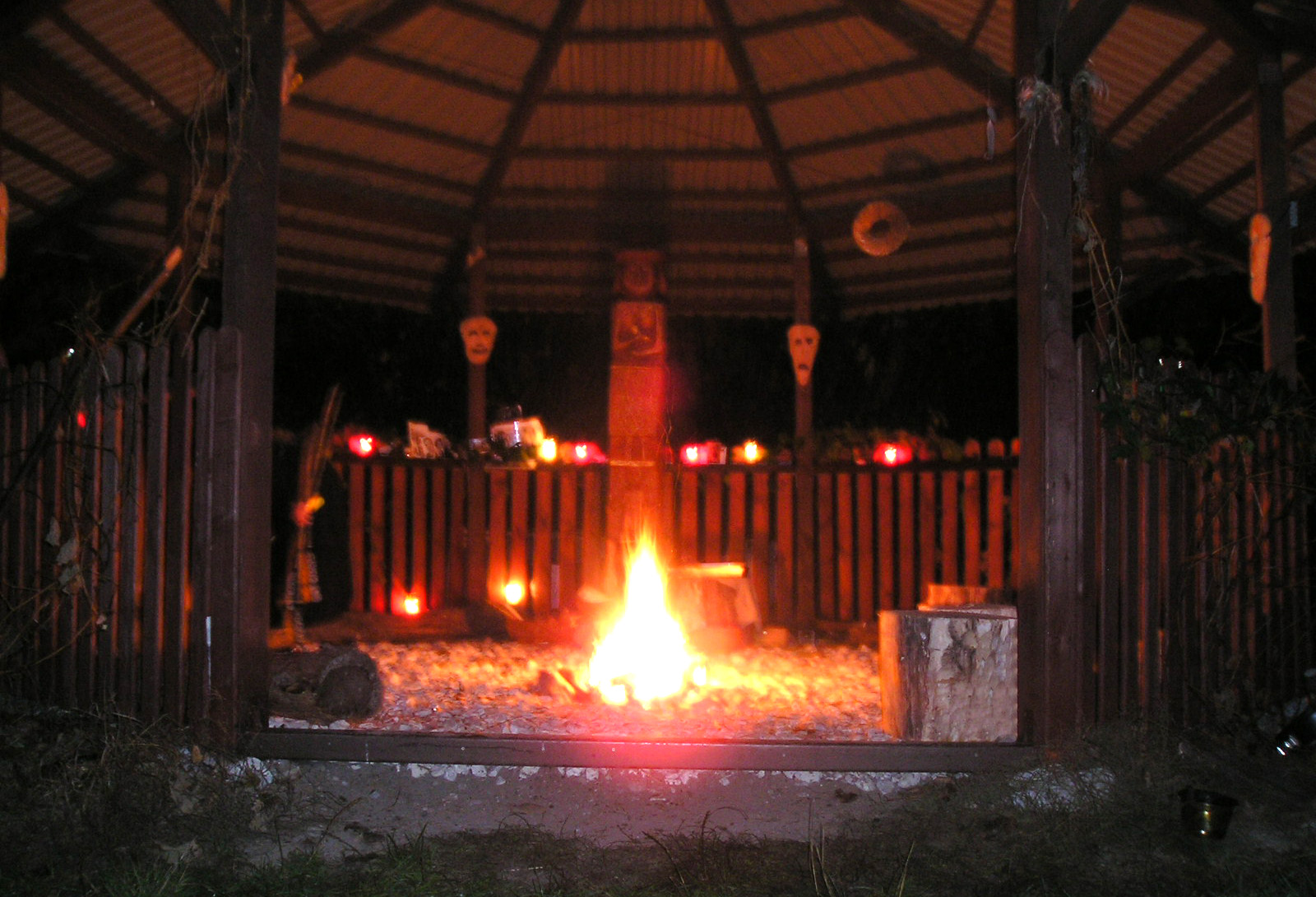
Mazovian temple, NPC during the celebration of the dziady in 2009

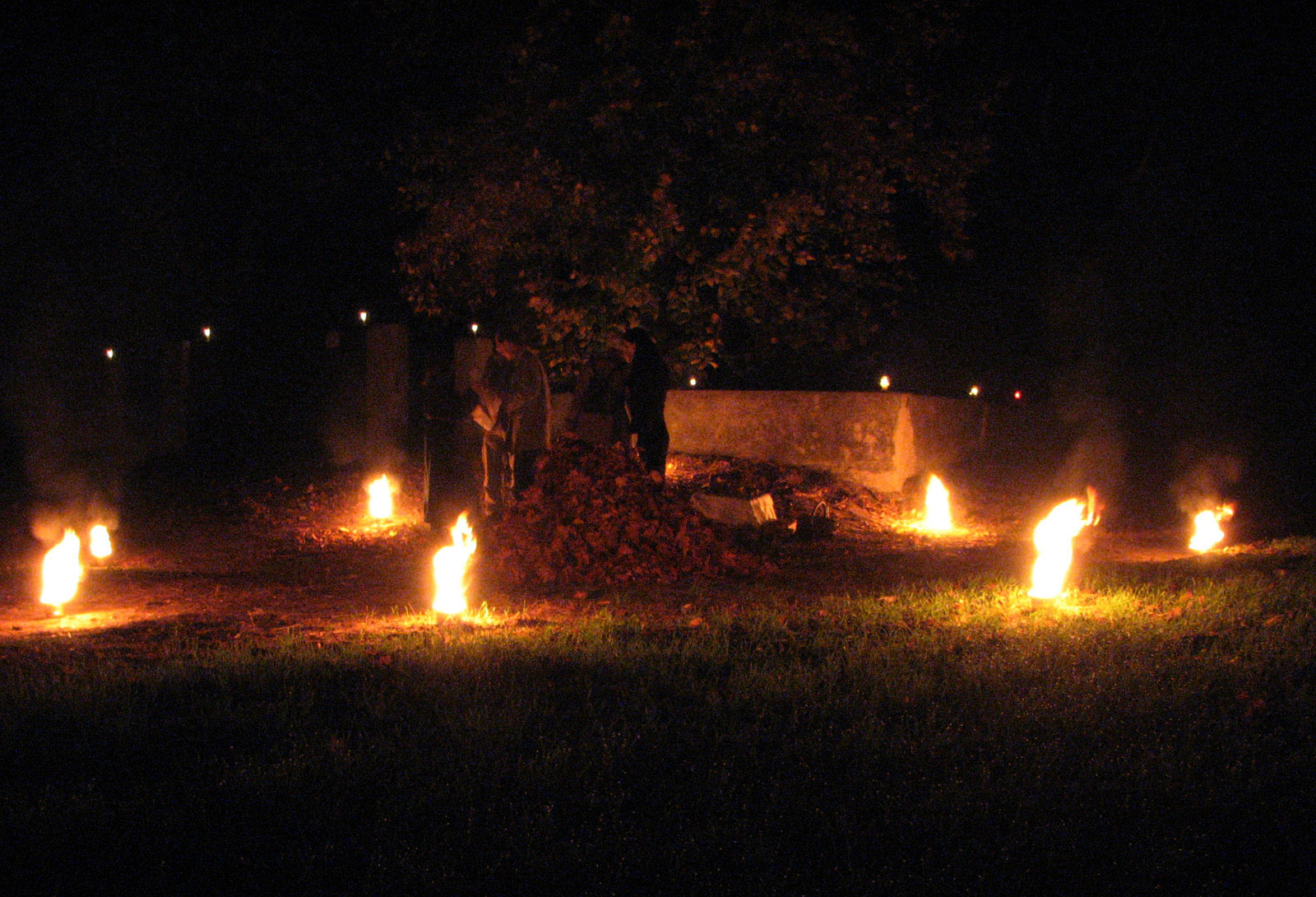
Preparations for the celebration of the dziady – NPC, 2008, Pęcice

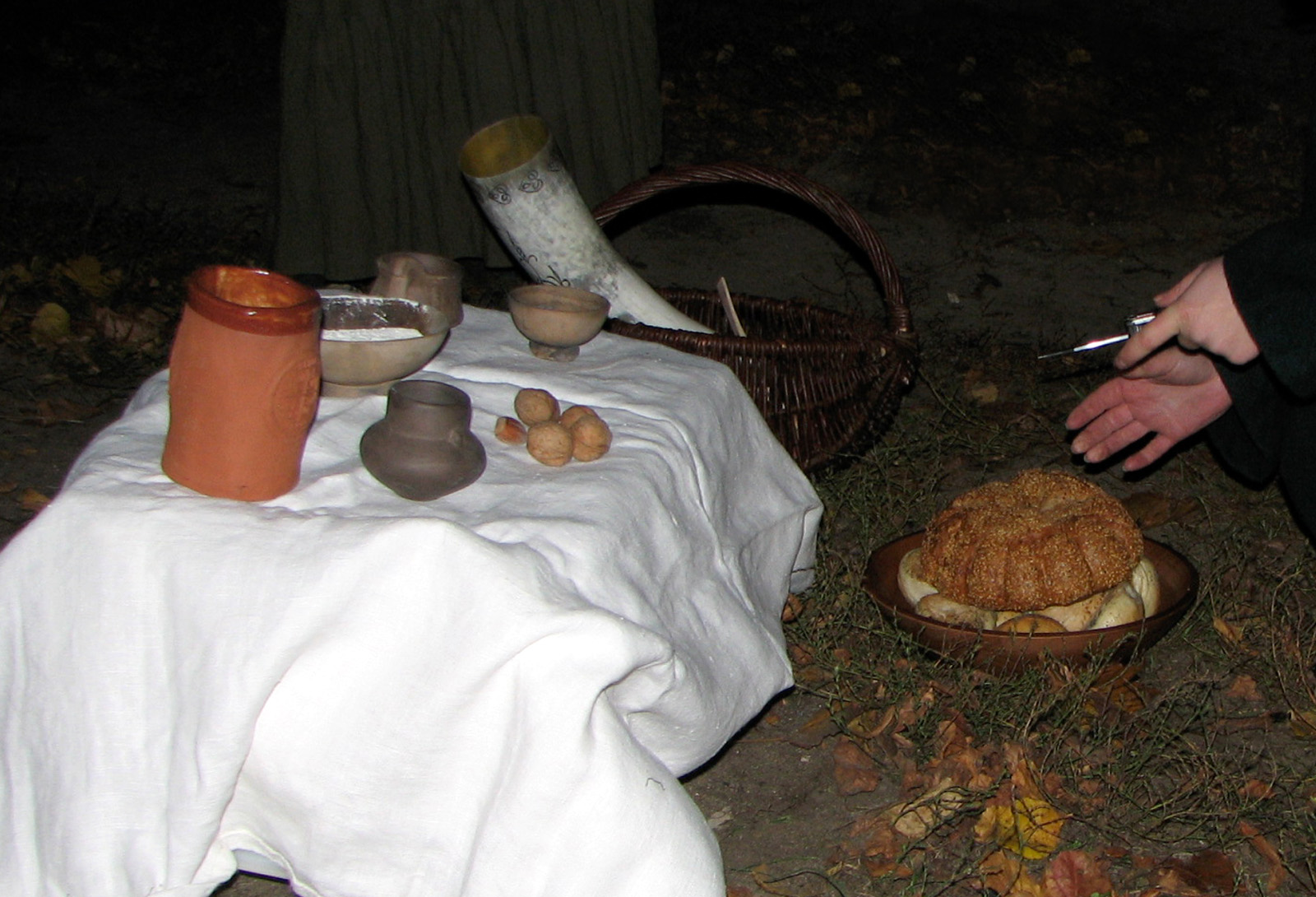
Preparation of the obiata during the dziady

== See also ==
- Dziady (poem)
- Samhain
- Veneration of the dead
- Day of the Dead
- Halloween
- Winter Nights
- Allhallowtide

== Bibliography ==
- Fischer, Adam (1923). Święto umarłych. Lwów: Muzeum im. Dzieduszyckich.
- Pietkiewicz, Czesław (1931). "Umarli w wierzeniach Białorusinów". Pamiętnik Warszawski. 2–3.
- Biegeleisen, Henryk (1929). U kolebki, przed ołtarzem, nad mogiłą. Lwów: Instytut Stauropigjański.
- Szyjewski, Andrzej (2003). Religia Słowian. Kraków: Wydawnictwo WAM. ISBN 83-7318-205-5.
- Krzyżanowski, Julian; Wojciechowski, Ryszard (1958). "„Dziady" kowieńsko-wileńskie". In Wantowska, Maria (ed.). Ludowość u Mickiewicza: praca zbiorowa. Warszawa: State Publishing Institute PIW.
- Swianiewiczowa, Olimpia (1961). "Dziady białoruskie". Rocznik Polskiego Towarzystwa Naukowego na Obczyźnie. 21.
- Swianiewiczowa, Olimpia (2018). Charytoniuk-Michiej, Grażyna (ed.). Interpretacja Dziadów Mickiewiczowskich na podstawie skarbca kultury białoruskiej. Toruń: Muzeum Etnograficzne im. Marii Znamierowskiej-Prüfferowej w Toruniu. ISBN 9788361891215.
- Kowalska-Lewicka, Anna (1994). "Zmarli są wśród nas. O obcowaniu zmarłych z żyjącymi". Rocznik Muzeum Etnograficznego W Krakowie. 9.
- Kolankiewicz, Leszek (1999). Dziady. Teatr święta zmarłych. Gdańsk: Słowo/Obraz Terytoria. ISBN 8387316393.
- Grochowski, Piotr (2009). Dziady. Rzecz o wędrownych żebrakach i ich pieśniach. Toruń: The Nicolaus Copernicus University Press. ISBN 978-83-231-2383-5.
- Pigoń, Stanisław (1966). "Wołyńskie przewody. Wiosenne święto zmarłych". Drzewiej i wczoraj: wśród zagadnień kultury i literatury. Wydawnictwo Literackie.
