= Biała, Zgierz County =

Biała
- Village
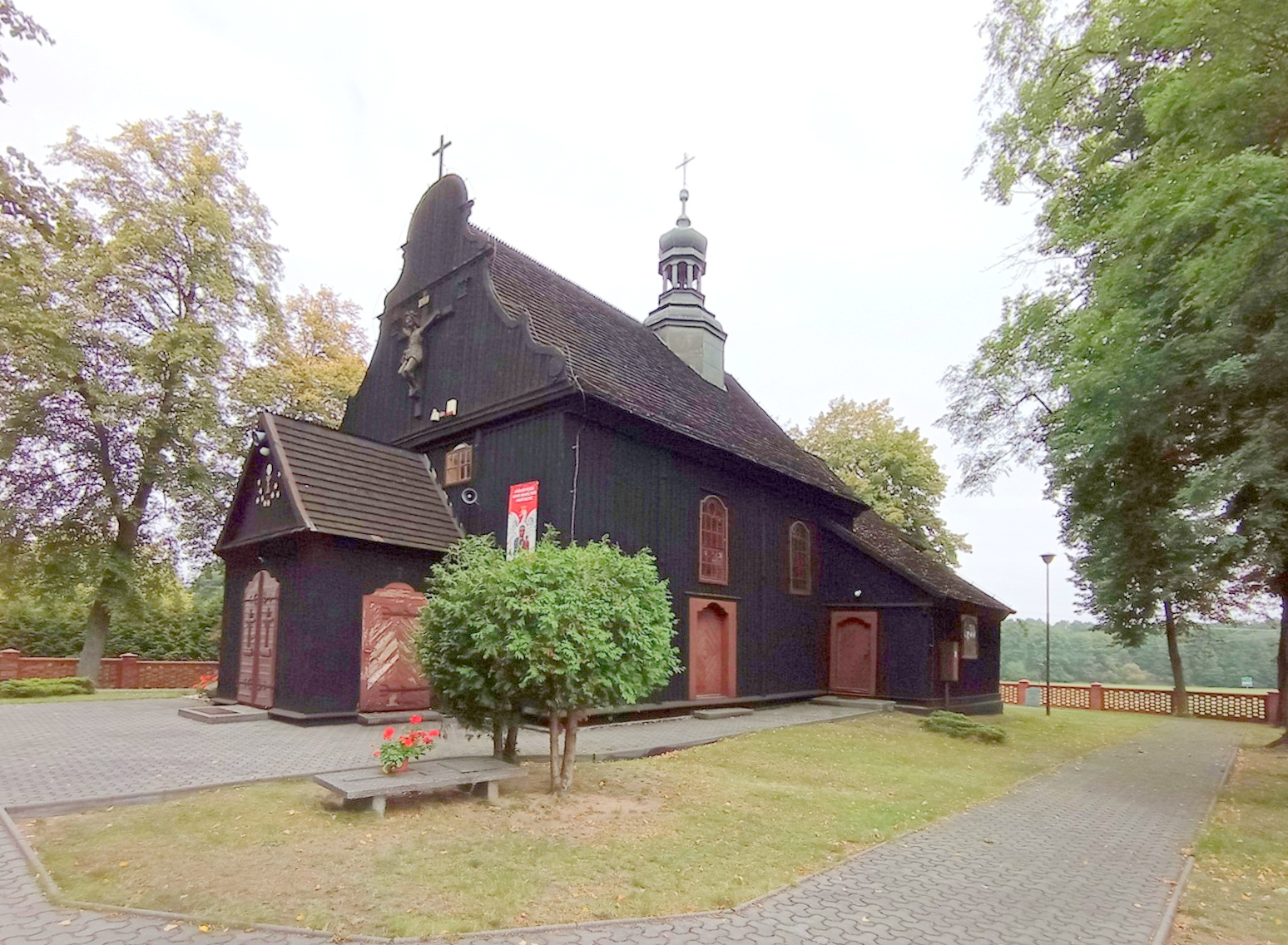
- Catholic church

- Location within Poland
- Coordinates: 51°55′50″N 19°26′40″E
- Country: Poland
- Voivodeship: Łódź
- County: Zgierz
- Gmina: Zgierz

Biała [ˈbjawa] (1943–1945 German Billheim) is a village in the administrative district of Gmina Zgierz, within Zgierz County, Łódź Voivodeship, in central Poland.

A Roman era (Przeworsk culture) cemetery was excavated near the village.
