= Henryk Biegeleisen =

Polish historian

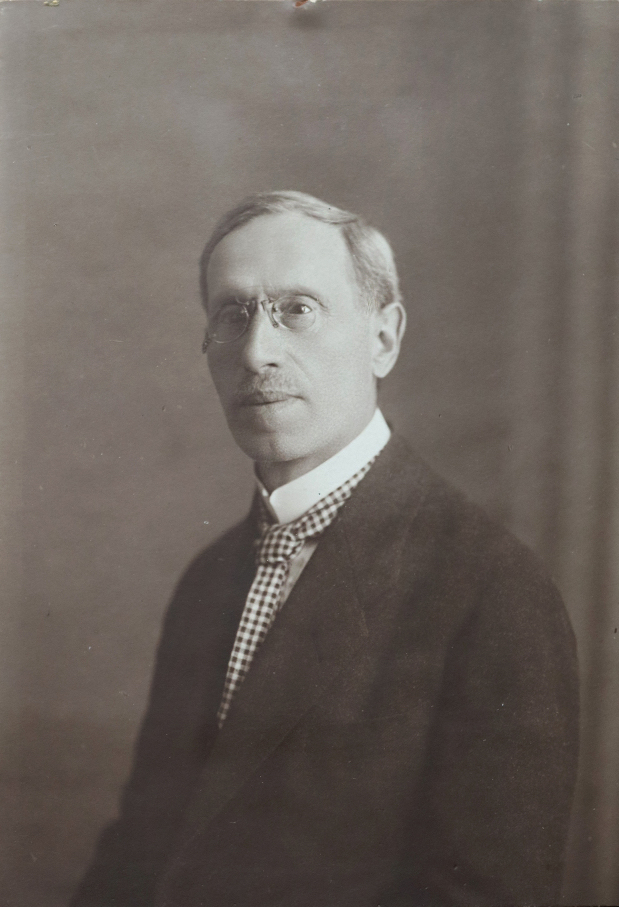
- Biegeleisen in Lwów
- Born: 1855
- Died: 1934 (aged 78–79)
- Occupations: Historian, ethnographer, author

Henryk Biegeleisen (1855–1934) was a Polish historian, literary critic, publisher, journalist, and ethnographer specializing in the history of Polish literature from the sixteenth through the nineteenth century. His greatest accomplishment in the field of publishing included a series of books devoted to Romanticism in Poland. He prepared annotated editions of works of the Polish national bards: Adam Mickiewicz, Juliusz Słowacki, and Zygmunt Krasiński.

== Career ==
Between 1899 and 1906 Biegeleisen wrote and published a five volume literary study titled An Illustrated History of Polish Literature (Ilustrowane dzieje literatury polskiej), which was a rare and valuable compendium and recapitulation of his lifelong research. His other work published between 1927 and 1931 were studies of Polish customs, beliefs and age-old traditions in several volumes titles Mother and Child in the Rites, Beliefs, and Customs of the Polish Folk (Matka i dziecko w obrzędach, wierzeniach i zwyczajach ludu polskiego), Medicine of the Polish Folk (Lecznictwo ludu polskiego), Weddings (Wesele), At the Cradle – Before the Altar – By the Tomb (U kolebki – przed ołtarzem – nad mogiła), and Death in the Rites, Customs, and Beliefs of the Polish Folk (Śmierć w obrzędach, zwyczajach wierzeniach ludu polskiego).

== Private life ==
His sons were Bolesław Biegeleisen and Leon Biegeleisen.
