= Slavic Native Faith and Christianity =

Relationship between religious movements

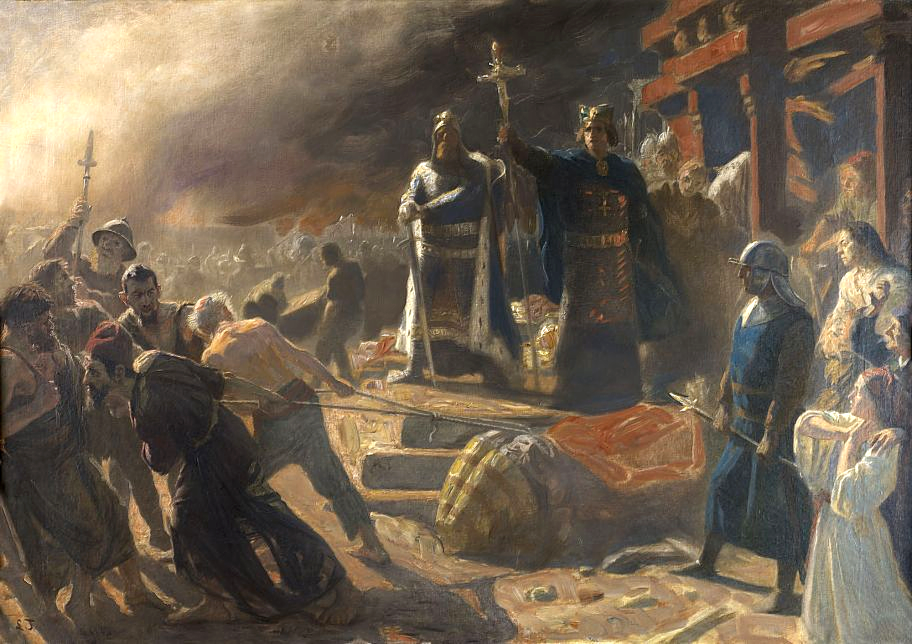
The bishop Absalon toppling the statue of the god Svetovid at Arkona—Laurits Tuxen, late 19th century

Slavic Native Faith and Christianity are mutually critical and often directly hostile to each other. Among the Slavic Native Faith (also known as Rodnovery) critiques are a view of religious monotheism as the root of mono-ideologies, by which is meant all ideologies that promote "universal and one-dimensional truths", unable to grasp the complexity of reality and therefore doomed to failure one after the other. These mono-ideologies include Abrahamic religions in general, and all the systems of thought and practice that these religions spawned throughout history, including both Marxism and capitalism, the general Western rationalistic mode of thinking begotten by the Age of Enlightenment, and ultimately the technocratic civilisation based on the idea of possession, exploitation and consumption of the environment. They are regarded as having led the world and humanity to a dead-end, and as destined to disappear and to be supplanted by the values represented by Rodnovery itself. To the "unipolar" world created by the mono-ideologies, and led by the American-influenced West, the Rodnovers oppose their political philosophy of "nativism" and "multipolarism".

For many Rodnovers, Old Testament theology and Christianity are regarded as the foremost cause of the degradation of the world and of humanity. Christianity in particular is denounced as an anthropocentric ideology which distorts the role of mankind in the cosmos by claiming that God could have been incarnated as a single historical entity (Jesus), at the same time creating hierarchical and centralised powers that throughout history defended the rich and legitimised slave mentality. Old Testament and Christian theologies also enforce a separation of the supreme God from the world of nature, not regarded as ennobled by spirit but as inanimate, and this, combined with their anthropocentrism, gives way to an exaltation of the technical power of mankind to possess, exploit and consume the environment. This "dangerous illusion of domination" of humanity over nature, is the root of the ecological disruption, of the spiritual and social crisis that humanity faces in the 21st century, of the "degeneration" (disconnection from the ancestors, the gods, and the ultimate God) of humanity itself. Joining Rodnovery and its values often involves ceremonies of formal rejection of Christianity and its products, called raskrestitsia ("de-Christianisation").

== Rodnover critiques ==
=== Monotheism as the root of "mono-ideologies" ===
Many Rodnover practitioners consciously and actively reject Christianity and the Abrahamic monotheisms. Rodnovers regard the theology of the Old Testament and Christianity as the primary causes of the degradation of the world and of humanity, as the root of all the "mono-ideologies" promoting "universal and one-dimensional truths" and smothering the multiplicity of reality. These "mono-ideologies" comprehend all their secular ideological products, including both Marxism and capitalism, the general Western rationalism begotten by the Age of Enlightenment, and ultimately the technocratic civilisation based on the idea of possession, exploitation and consumption of the environment. If Christians claim to have a monopoly on truth, Rodnovers often equate Christianity with Soviet Marxism. The Russian volkhv Dobroslav (Aleksey Dobrovolsky) declared that:

Nature-swallowing capitalism is an ugly child of the Judeo-Christian civilisation [...] the only way out is to go back [...] from the cult of profit to the cult of life.

Some Rodnover practitioners take a specific hostile stance toward Judaism, which they regard as having spawned Christianity. In turn, Christianity is regarded by some Rodnovers as having led the Slavs and other Europeans under the control of the Jews. According to them Christianity is "in itself [...] evil for all mankind", and was created by relying "on the most humiliated part of humanity, distinguished by treachery". Judaism is also considered the first thought-system to have demonised the Earth, identifying it with hell, due to the fact of Jews being people without land of their own.

=== Anthropocentrism ===
All these ideologies, based on the principle of the verb "to have", are thought by Rodnovers to be the iteration of the existential model introduced by Abrahamic theology and Christian theology in particular, which "paradoxically combines the broadest freedom of human personality with the ontological primacy of the absolute" God and his deterministic will. Christianity enforces a separation of God from the world, regarded as its external creation deprived of intrinsic spiritual value, and installs the anthropocentric idea that God became incarnated as a single historical entity (Jesus), which distorts the role of mankind in the cosmos, allegedly raising the individual above the surrounding world by making him "the crown of creation" and giving him a "dangerous illusion of domination" over the Earth and other entities, based on the justification for the impious possession, exploitation and consumption of the environment contained in the Old Testament:

Fill the earth and subdue it, and have dominion over the fish of the sea, and over the birds of the air, and over all animals that creep on the ground.

The anthropocentrism of Christianity is also regarded by Rodnovers as a tool that throughout history was used to establish hierarchical and centralised powers which defended the rich and legitimised slave mentality, promoting humile behaviour, antithetically to a Rodnover ethical emphasis on courage and fighting spirit, and theological emphasis on the ontological freedom of living beings. In general, Christianity is conceived as a religion of servilism (rab), while Rodnovery is conceived as freedom of choice and faith in Rod, the principle from which everything descends. Koldun—a Russian Rodnover priest from Krasnodar—also defined the Abrahamic religions as ideologies which dissolve the many individual identities into amorphous throngs, in which the value of the individual is lost, while he defined indigenous Rodnovery as true knowledge which stimulates the effort of the individual consciousness to self-improvement. Rodnovers emphasise that they are "offspring of gods, not servants of God" created from dirt, implying that every living being is a decentralised fragment of God, "an independent entity in the rational-conscious, volitional and active senses", and yet always organically part of the immanent God.

Christianity and its products are regarded by Rodnovers as having led the world and humanity to a dead-end, and as the ultimate cause of the ecological, social and spiritual crisis which humanity is facing in the twenty-first century, due to the "degeneration" of humanity itself, the disconnection from nature, from the genealogical line of ancestors, gods linking up to the supreme God. Christianity is also deemed immoral, as it destroys morality by casting human responsibility away from the present world and into a transcendent future when actions will be judged by God and people either smitten or forgiven for their sins, in fact exempting people from responsibility in the present time, while at the same time imposing a fake moralism of self-deprecation, self-destruction and suppression of the flesh. Christians acquired power through cunning and deceit: in the Roman Empire, Christian bodyguards killed the last emperor of traditional religion, Julian, while when the emperor Constantine killed his own son and no priest of the traditional religion agreed to cleanse him of his crime, this was eventually done by a Christian priest, demonstrating that Christianity is "absolutely immoral". It and the other Abrahamic religions are thought as foreign entities which lead to the destruction of organic communities.

=== Raskrestitsia ===
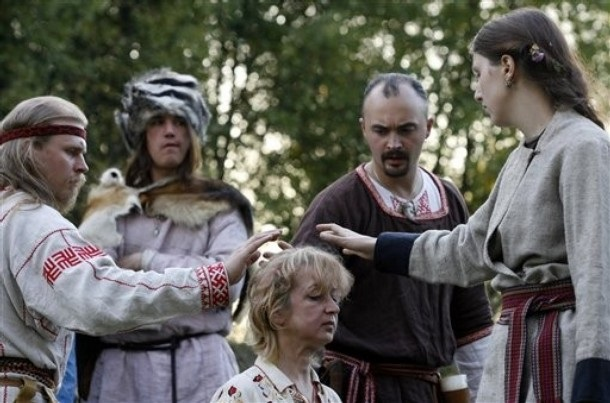
A female neophyte during the fourth stage of her initiation rite, around Moscow, Russia

Many Rodnover groups organise formal ceremonies of renunciation of Christianity (raskrestitsia, literally "de-Christianisation") and initiation into Rodnovery. Central to the conversion is the adoption by the convert of a new name pertaining to the Slavic tradition (imianarechenie). Generally speaking, the raskrestitsia ceremony symbolises the death of the Christian individual and his rebirth as a Rodnover. Some groups, especially male brotherhoods, practise the cutting of a second "life line" on the palm of the hand of converts, symbolising the new "blood bond" that is formed with other members.

The rite of raskrestitsia and admission into a Rodnover community takes place through seven precise stages: firstly, the neophyte kneels over twigs or straw in a place encompassed by a closed circle cut into the ground, intended as warding off the evil forces (identified as Christianity and its products); secondly, there is a purification ritual in which the head of the neophyte is washed, his shirt is torn, trampled and burnt to symbolise the complete rejection of former life; thirdly, three priests carry fire around the neophyte, pour grains and blow air at him, while making purifying gestures with their hands; fourthly, the priests move around the neophyte according to the Sun's trajectory while keeping their right hands over his head and crying Goy ("Gentile") or Swa (a name of the mother goddess according to the Book of Veles) three times; fifthly, the priests raise their hands towards the sky and loudly pronounce three times the new name for the neophyte, chosen by the community and approved by the priests themselves; sixthly, the circle is broken and the neophyte makes his first sacrifice with grains; seventhly, the neophyte is served a scoopful (kovsh) of mead (surya, a term borrowed from the Indo-Aryan tradition) in order to respect his progenitors.

=== Campaigns and attacks ===
Some Rodnovers have campaigned and perpetrated attacks against Christianity and its purported influences. For instance in 1996 an Orthodox Christian cathedral was desecrated in Minsk by Rodnovers who covered it with graffiti, including one who read "Christians, go away from our Belarusian soil!" In 2006 Rodnovers marching in Kyiv chanted "Out with Jehovah! Glory to Dazhboh!" and in Poland several Rodnovers launched a poster campaign against Valentine's Day, which they regarded as not being an authentically Polish celebration. In Russia, Slavic Native Faith practitioners have been responsible for the vandalism and arson attacks carried out on various Christian churches.

== Christian critiques ==
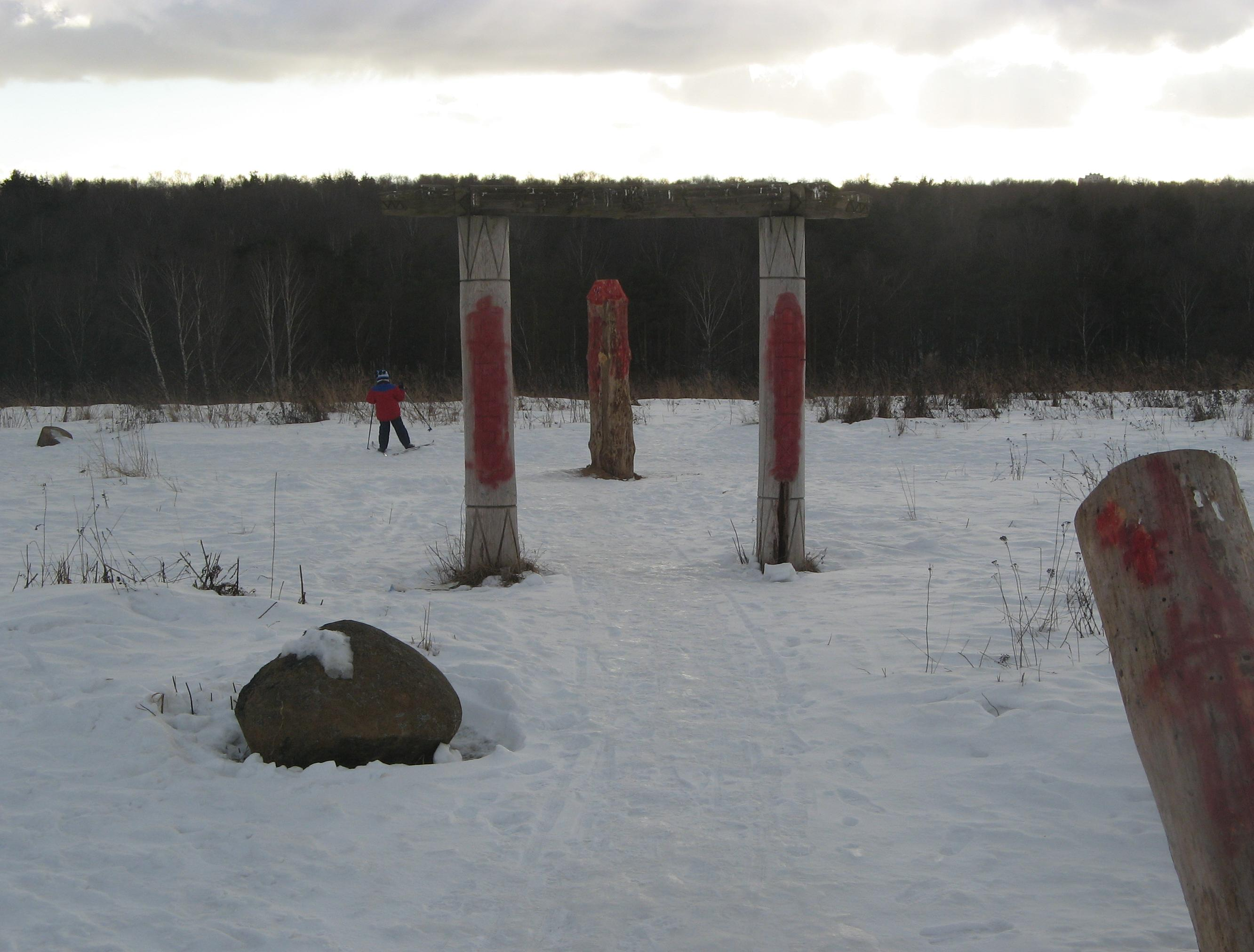
Rodnover shrine vandalised by Christians in 2008, in Bitsa Park, Moscow, Russia

Christians have expressed opposition to Slavic Native Faith, for instance through the establishment of social media groups against the movement. The Russian Orthodox Church has expressed concern for the growth and spread of Rodnovery across Russia on various occasions. In the 2000 edition of his book Sektovedeniye, the Russian Orthodox theologian Alexander Dvorkin recognised that "in today's Russia, Neopagan nativistic sects are mushrooming" and that "altogether they represent a notable phenomenon of post-Soviet Russian religious life".

In 2009 there was a well-known public debate between Orthodox Christians and Rodnovers in Kaluga; the former were led by priest Daniel Sysoev and the latter by Vadim Kazakov, head of the Union of Slavic Rodnover Communities. More recently, in November 2014 Patriarch Kirill himself expressed concerns about "attempts to construct a pseudo-Russian Neopagan belief" and the well-known priest Vsevolod Chaplin called for Rodnovery's outright ban "on the level of law". In early 2015, the official journal of the Ascension Cathedral of Astrakhan published a polemical piece entitled Adversus paganos in which church authorities complained about the growth of Rodnovery and the fact that "representatives of government and public organisations" spoke of a need to revive "Orthodoxy and the religion of ancient Slavs", leading many young people to join the movement.

In early 2016, at the "International Educational Christmas Readings" in Moscow, Merya ethnofuturistic religious revivals and the spread of Rodnovery among the Russian Armed Forces were discussed as issues of particular concern. A conference explicitly dedicated to counteract the spread of Rodnovery was held in March 2016 at the Magnitogorsk State Technical University; on this occasion, bishop Innokenty of Magnitogorsk and Vekrhneuralsk said that Slavic Native Faith constitutes "a greater threat to the Church than atheism". Vladimir Legoyda, succeeding Vsevolod Chaplin as president of the Synodal Department for Church Charity and Social Ministry, said that the spread of Slavic Native Faith among the military constitutes "a direct challenge to the Church".

== Conciliatory positions ==
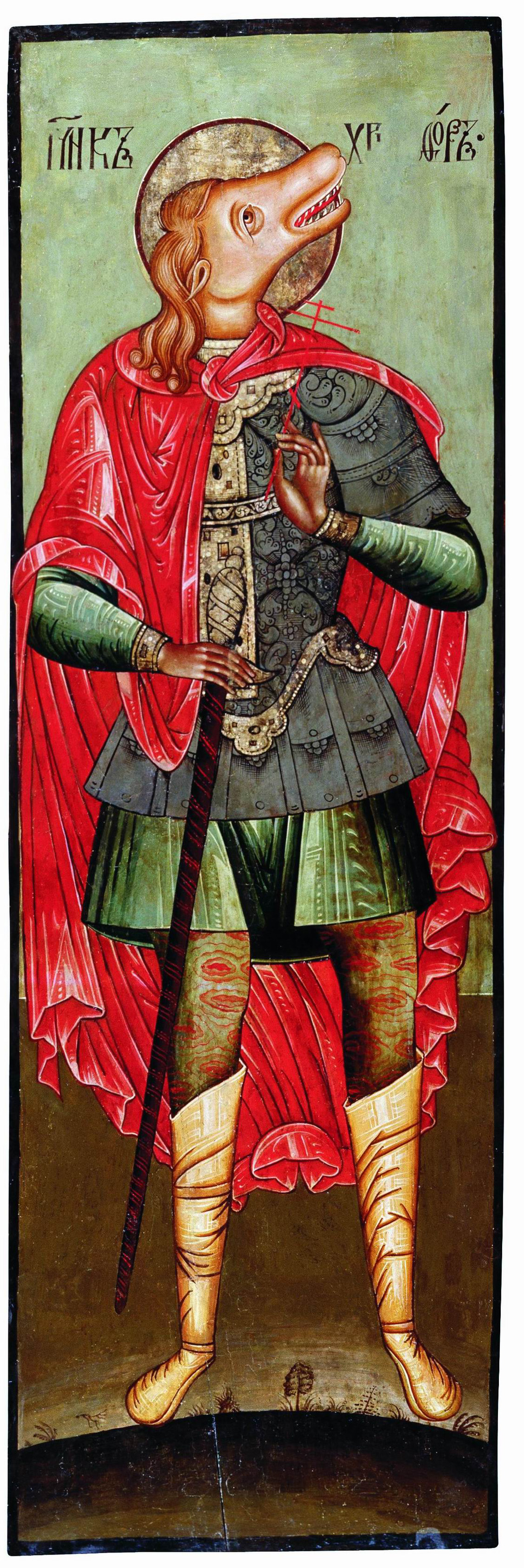
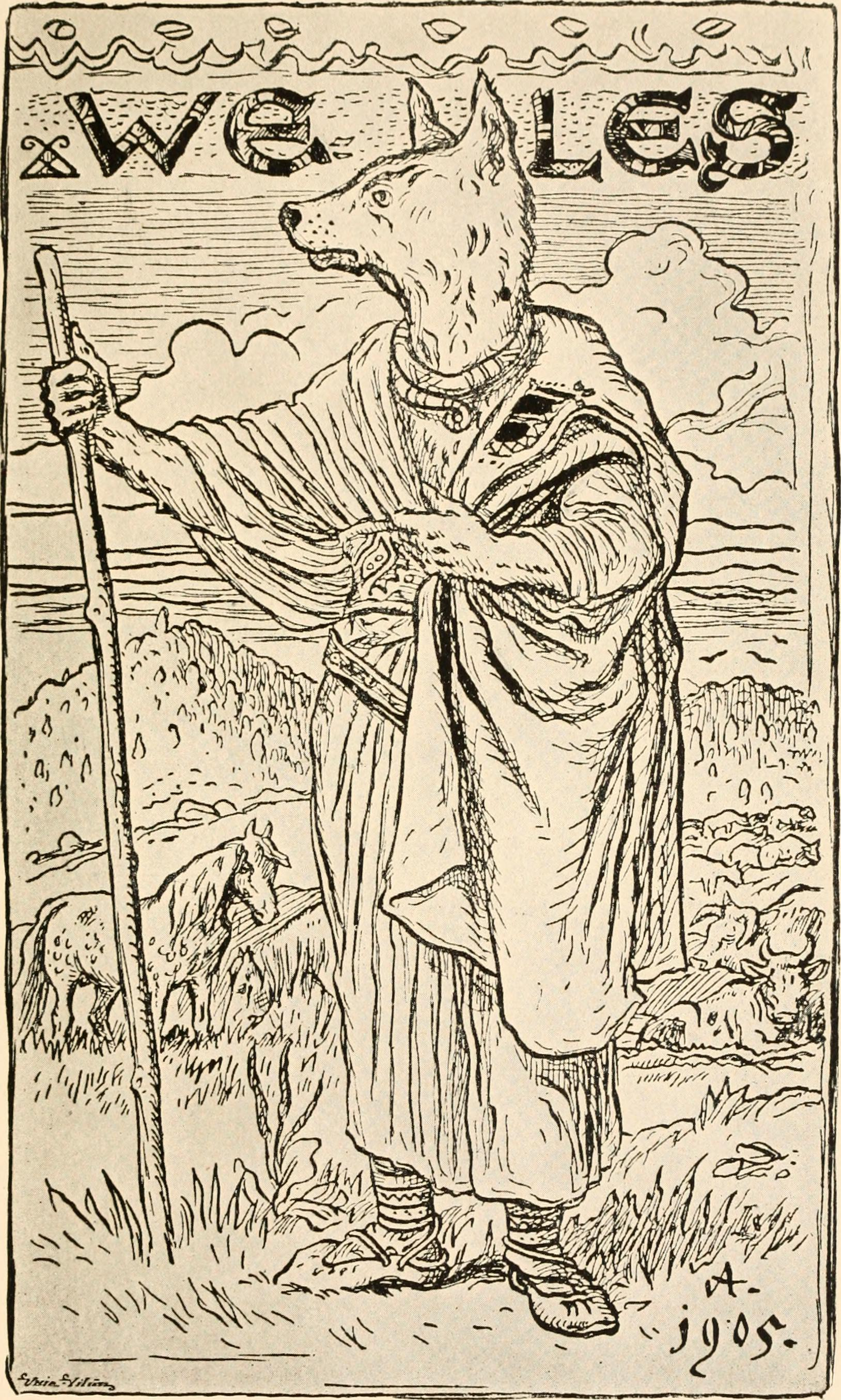
Saint Christopher (i.e. "Christ-carrier")—17th-century icon from Cherepovets. A transmission of the ancient Egyptian god Anubis, equated with the Slavic god Veles, (Note: Already Gerald Massey, one of the early proponents of the interpretation that Christ is a mythological theme — the synthesis of pre-Christian mythological themes — representing the unfolding of life, especially in the guise of the cycle of the Sun, in his 1883 work The Natural Genesis (p. 459), highlighted the parallel between Saint Christopher who bears the baby Christ on his back thwartwise the Jordan River, and Anubis who carries the baby Horus thwartwise the waters of the "world below". Saint Christopher/Anubis is also equated with the Slavic god Veles, the god of the watery netherworld, who in some occurrences is represented, just like them, with a wolf or dog head. Illustration of Veles from The Mythology of All Races, Vol. 3, 1918) the representation of Saint Christopher as dog- or wolf- or horse-headed is part of the folk tradition of the Eastern Orthodox Church. Officially censored by the Russian Most Holy Synod in 1722, it is however preserved within the tradition of the Old Belief.

Some Russian Rodnovers have however attempted to improve relations with the Orthodox Church, arguing that Russian Orthodoxy had adopted many elements of pre-Christian belief and rites, though for some by corrupting their original meaning. In this way they argue that Russian Orthodoxy is distinct from other forms of Christianity, and seek to portray it as the "younger brother" of Slavic Native Faith. The same term "Orthodoxy" is regarded by many Rodnovers as having been usurped by the early Slavic Christians, as it originally referred to the ancient Slavic and Indo-European worldview, the Slavic equivalent Pravoslavie meaning to "praise" or "glorify" (slava) the "right" (Prav) universal law of God.

Some hierarchs of the Russian Orthodox Church have called for a civil dialogue between Orthodox Christianity and Rodnovery, recognising the values about connection with the land and the ancestral tradition that the Rodnover movement carries with itself, as "it is not worthwhile to erect vain and unfounded vilification and throw mud at our ancestors", as these values were "not even in sight for a thousand years in Russia, for rare exceptions, and even more so in other countries. It is precisely this forgotten culture of the land, if one may call it that, that has now begun to revive in Russia" and could prevent that "we [Russians] become one hundred percent Westerners". Some Orthodox newspapers have presented the Rodnovers as brothers, sharers of the same values advocated by the Russian Orthodox Church. Based on these considerations, some hierarchs of the Church have even expressed the possibility of an integration of Rodnovery and the Russian Orthodox Church.

The Orthodox Christian Old Believers, a movement that split out from the Russian Orthodox Church during the reform of Patriarch Nikon of Moscow in the seventeenth century, are seen by Rodnovers in a more positive light than the mainstream Russian Orthodox Church, as Old Believers are considered to have elements similar to those of the Slavic Native Faith. Scholars have studied how the Old Believers have preserved Indo-European and early Slavic ideas and practices such as the veneration of fire as a channel to the divine world, the symbolism of the colour red, the search for a "glorious death", and in general the holistic vision of a divine cosmos.

== Sociological perspectives ==
According to Pavel Skrylnikov of the Institute of Ethnology and Anthropology of the Russian Academy of Sciences, the Russian Orthodox Church is uneasy about the growth of Slavic Native Faith because Rodnover communities "are far better consolidated than parishioners of Orthodox churches" because their activities are not reduced to one routine rite, but what they offer is a whole community lifestyle that goes from game and sports competitions to workshops and festivals, all complemented by worship services to the gods. Moreover, Slavic Native Faith "offers an alternative version of national and religious identity" that is not perceived as having originated abroad, and therefore fulfils "patriotic religious needs" better than Christianity.

Similarly, Marlène Laruelle said that Rodnovery has been successful among the youth and that portion of Russian society interested in the post-Soviet revival of faith but turned off by Orthodox Christianity, "which is very institutionalized" and "out of tune with the modern world", and "is not appealing [to these people] because it expects its faithful to comply with normative beliefs without room for interpretation". Rodnovery is attractive because of its "paradoxical conjunction" of tradition and modernity, recovery of the past through innovative syntheses, and its values calling for a rediscovery of the true relationship between mankind, nature and the ancestors.

== See also ==
- Eurasianism
- Slavic Native Faith
- Metamodernism
