= Mono-ideology =

Russian philosophical concept

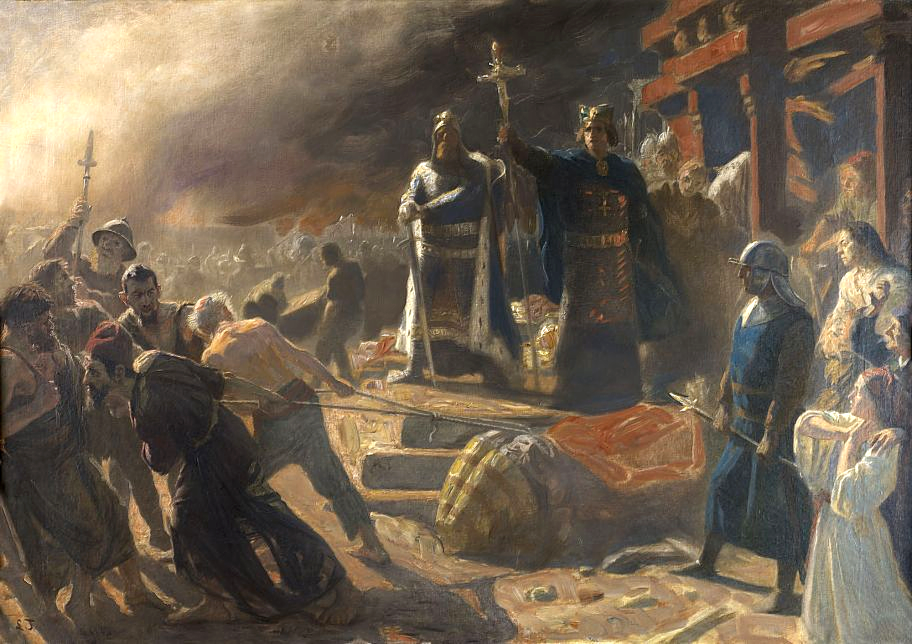
The bishop Absalon (c. 1128–1201) toppling the statue of the god Svetovid at Arkona—Laurits Tuxen, late-19th century

Mono-ideologies (Russian: моноидеологии, romanized: monoideologii, singular: моноидеология) are a type of ideology in Russian political and philosophical discourse.

Mono-ideologies have been described as fundamentally being linked to totalitarianism and to Millenarianism. A totalitarian political system requires an equally total mono-ideology. It can be built on various grounds: nationalist, class, but in any case, it performs two main functions – legitimizing the power of the party or state, and mobilizing the masses. The concept sees political (party) monism as paralleling ideological monism.

Alexander Yakovlev (1923–2005) criticized mono-ideologies in 1993. He was called the "godfather of glasnost" for his role as the intellectual force behind Mikhail Gorbachev's reform program of glasnost and perestroika in the 1980s.

== Slavic Native Faith and mono-ideologies ==
Rodnovery is critical towards mono-ideologies. By "mono-ideologies", they mean all those ideologies which promote "universal and one-dimensional truths", unable to grasp the complexity of reality and therefore doomed to failure one after the other. These mono-ideologies include Christianity and the Abrahamic monotheisms in general, and all the systems of thought and practice that these religions spawned throughout history, including both Marxism and capitalism, the general Western rationalistic mode of thinking begotten by the Age of Enlightenment, and ultimately the technocratic civilisation based on the idea of possession, exploitation and consumption of the environment. They are regarded as having led the world and humanity to a dead-end, and as destined to disappear and to be supplanted by the values represented by Rodnovery itself. To the "unipolar" world created by the mono-ideologies, and led by the American-influenced West, the Rodnovers oppose their political philosophy of "nativism" and "multipolarism".

Old Testament theology and Christianity are regarded by Rodnovers as the primary cause of the degradation of the world and of humanity, as the root of all the "mono-ideologies" promoting "universal and one-dimensional truths" and smothering the multiplicity of reality. These "mono-ideologies" comprehend all their secular ideological products, including both Marxism and capitalism, the general Western rationalism begotten by the Age of Enlightenment, and ultimately the technocratic civilisation based on the idea of possession, exploitation and consumption of the environment. For its claim to have a monopoly on truth, Rodnovers often equate Christianity with Soviet Marxism. The Russian volkhv Dobroslav (Aleksey Dobrovolsky) declared that:

Nature-swallowing capitalism is an ugly child of the Judeo-Christian civilisation ... the only way out is to go back ... from the cult of profit to the cult of life.

All these ideologies, based on the principle of the verb "to have", are thought by Rodnovers to be the iteration of the existential model introduced by Abrahamic theology and Christian theology in particular, which "paradoxically combines the broadest freedom of human personality with the ontological primacy of the absolute" God and his deterministic will.

== See also ==
- Eurasianism
- Metamodernism
- Slavic Native Faith and mono-ideologies
