= Panteleimon Shatov =

Russian Orthodox bishop

- Bishop
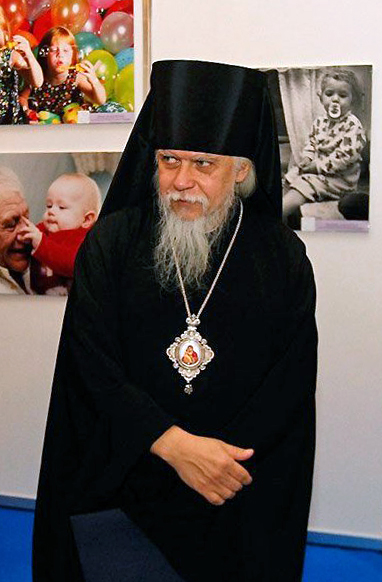
- Church: Russian Orthodox Church

Personal details
- Born: Arkadiy Viktorovich Shatov; September 18, 1950 (age 75) Moscow, Russian SFSR, USSR

Bishop Panteleimon (secular name Arkadiy Viktorovich Shatov, Russian: Аркадий Викторович Шатов; 18 September 1950, Moscow) is the Russian Orthodox Bishop of Orekhovo-Zuyevo and chairman of the Synodal Department for Church Charity and Social Ministry.

From 21 August 2010 to 22 March 2011 he served as Bishop of Orekhovo-Zuyevo, vicar of the Diocese of Moscow.
