= Ideology =

Set of beliefs or values

An ideology is a set of ideals, values, or beliefs that is attributed to a person or group of people, especially those held for reasons that are not purely about belief in certain knowledge, and in which "practical elements are as prominent as theoretical ones". It is related to, but distinct from, a worldview.

The term was coined by Antoine Destutt de Tracy, a French Enlightenment aristocrat and philosopher, who conceived it in 1796 as the "science of ideas" to develop a rational system of ideas. In political science, the term is used in a descriptive sense to refer to political belief systems.

== Etymology ==
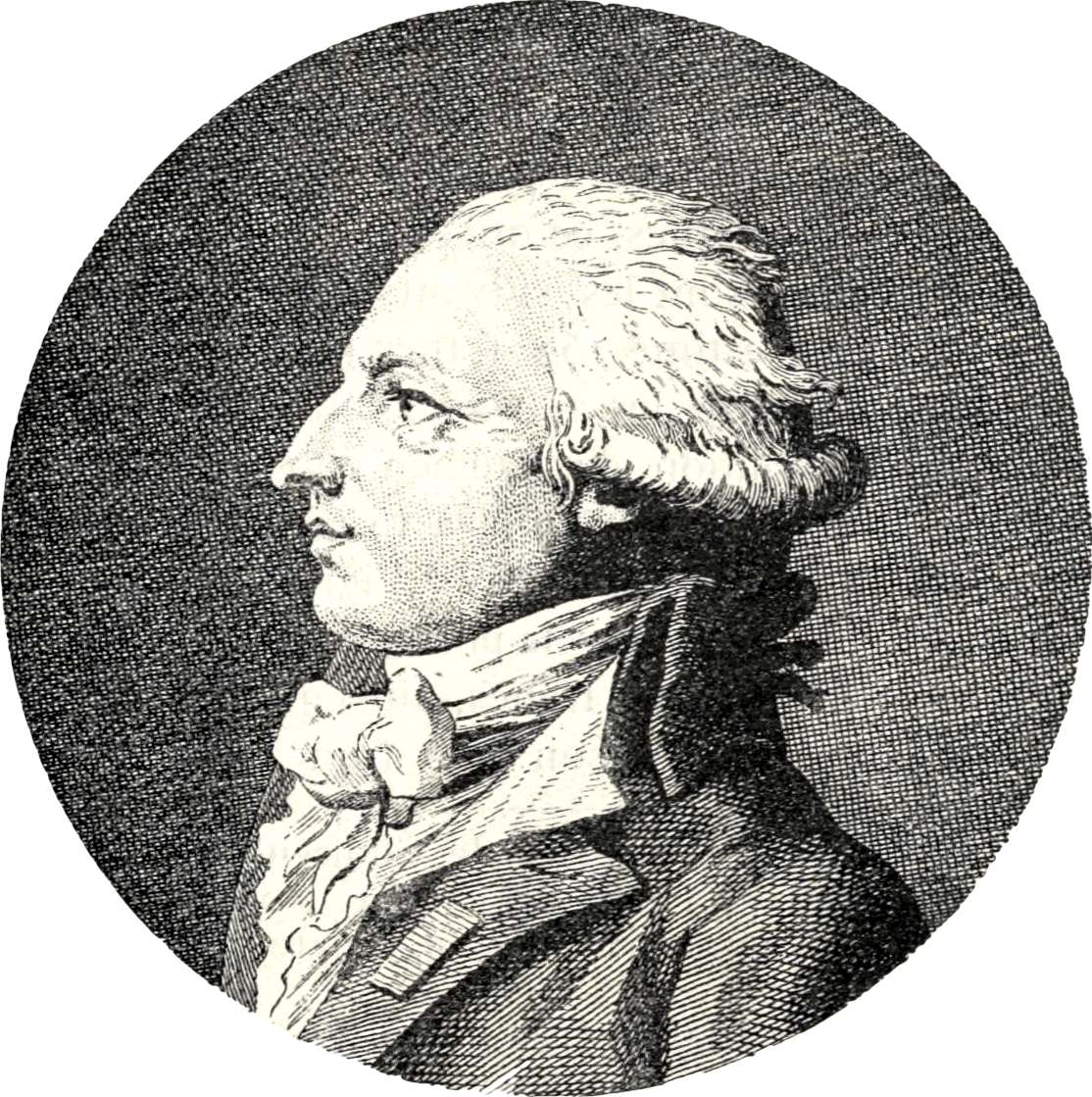
Antoine Destutt de Tracy coined the term ideology.

The term ideology originates from French idéologie, itself coined from combining Greek: idéā (ἰδέα, 'notion, pattern'; close to the Lockean sense of idea) and -logíā (-λογῐ́ᾱ, 'the study of'). It was coined in 1796 by the French thinker Destutt de Tracy, and the term "ideology" originally denoted the "science of ideas". By 1907, however, the term had acquired a new sense in English, referring to a comprehensive framework of beliefs and doctrines that serves as a lens for interpreting the world. Over time the sense of the term grew even broader, eventually coming to describe any coherent system of political, social, or cultural ideas.

An ideologue is someone who strongly believes in an ideology. The term carries negative connotations, often referring to someone who is blindly partisan, zealous, or fanatical in their beliefs.

== History ==
The term ideology and the system of ideas associated with it were developed in 1796 by Antoine Destutt de Tracy (1754–1836), who crystallised his ideas while in prison (November 1793 to October 1794) pending trial during the Reign of Terror of c. 1793 to July 1794. While imprisoned he read the works of Locke and Étienne Bonnot de Condillac.

Hoping to form a secure foundation for the moral and political sciences, Tracy devised the term for a "science of ideas", basing such upon two things: (1) the sensations that people experience as they interact with the material world; and (2) the ideas that form in their minds due to those sensations. Tracy conceived of ideology as a liberal philosophy that would defend individual liberty, property, free markets, and constitutional limits on state power. He argues that, among these aspects, ideology is the most generic term because the 'science of ideas' also contains the study of their expression and deduction.

According to Karl Mannheim's historical reconstruction of the shifts in the meaning of ideology, the modern meaning of the word was born when Napoleon used it to describe his opponents as "the ideologues". Tracy's major book, The Elements of Ideology (French: Élémens d'idéologie, published 1804–1815), was soon translated into major European languages.

In the century following Tracy's formulations, the term ideology moved back and forth between positive and negative connotations. When post-Napoleonic governments adopted a reactionary stance, the concept influenced the Italian, Spanish and Russian thinkers who had begun to describe themselves as liberals and who attempted to reignite revolutionary activity in the early 1820s, including the Carbonari societies in France and Italy and the Decembrists in Russia. Karl Marx (1818–1883) adopted Napoleon's negative sense of the term, using it in his writings, in which he once described Tracy as a fischblütige Bourgeoisdoktrinär (a "fish-blooded bourgeois doctrinaire"). The term has since dropped some of its pejorative sting (euphemism treadmill), and has become a neutral term in the analysis of differing political opinions and views of social groups. While Marx situated the term within class struggle and domination, others believed it was a necessary part of institutional functioning and social integration.

In parallel with post-Soviet Russian ideas about the mono-ideologies of (for example) monotheism, Walter Brueggemann (1933–2025) has examined "ideological extension" in historical religious/political contexts.

== Definitions and analysis ==
There are many different kinds of ideologies, including political, social, epistemological, and ethical. Recent analysis tends to posit that ideology is a 'coherent system of ideas' that rely on a few basic assumptions about reality that may or may not have any factual basis. Through this system, ideas become coherent, repeated patterns through the subjective ongoing choices that people make. These ideas serve as the seed around which further thought grows. The belief in an ideology can range from passive acceptance up to fervent advocacy. Definitions, such as by Manfred Steger and Paul James, emphasize both the issue of patterning and contingent claims to truth. They wrote: "Ideologies are patterned clusters of normatively imbued ideas and concepts, including particular representations of power relations. These conceptual maps help people navigate the complexity of their political universe and carry claims to social truth."

Studies of the concept of ideology itself (rather than specific ideologies) have been carried out under the name of systematic ideology in the works of George Walford and Harold Walsby, who attempt to explore the relationships between ideology and social systems. David W. Minar describes six different ways the word ideology has been used:

1. As a collection of certain ideas with certain kinds of content, usually normative;
2. As the form or internal logical structure that ideas have within a set;
3. By the role ideas play in human-social interaction;
4. By the role ideas play in the structure of an organization;
5. As meaning, whose purpose is persuasion; and
6. As the locus of social interaction.

For Willard A. Mullins, an ideology should be contrasted with the related (but different) issues of utopia and historical myth. An ideology is composed of four basic characteristics:

1. it must have power over cognition;
2. it must be capable of guiding one's evaluations;
3. it must provide guidance towards action; and
4. it must be logically coherent.

Terry Eagleton outlines (more or less in no particular order) some definitions of ideology:

1. The process of production of meanings, signs and values in social life
2. A body of ideas characteristic of a particular social group or class
3. Ideas that help legitimate a dominant political power
4. False ideas that help legitimate a dominant political power
5. Systematically distorted communication
6. Ideas that offer a position for a subject
7. Forms of thought motivated by social interests
8. Identity thinking
9. Socially necessary illusion
10. The conjuncture of discourse and power
11. The medium in which conscious social actors make sense of their world
12. Action-oriented sets of beliefs
13. The confusion of linguistic and phenomenal reality
14. Semiotic closure
15. The indispensable medium in which individuals live out their relations to a social structure
16. The process that converts social life to a natural reality

German philosopher Christian Duncker called for a "critical reflection of the ideology concept". In his work, he strove to bring the concept of ideology into the foreground, as well as the closely connected concerns of epistemology and history, defining ideology in terms of a system of presentations that explicitly or implicitly lay claim to absolute truth.

=== Marxist interpretation ===
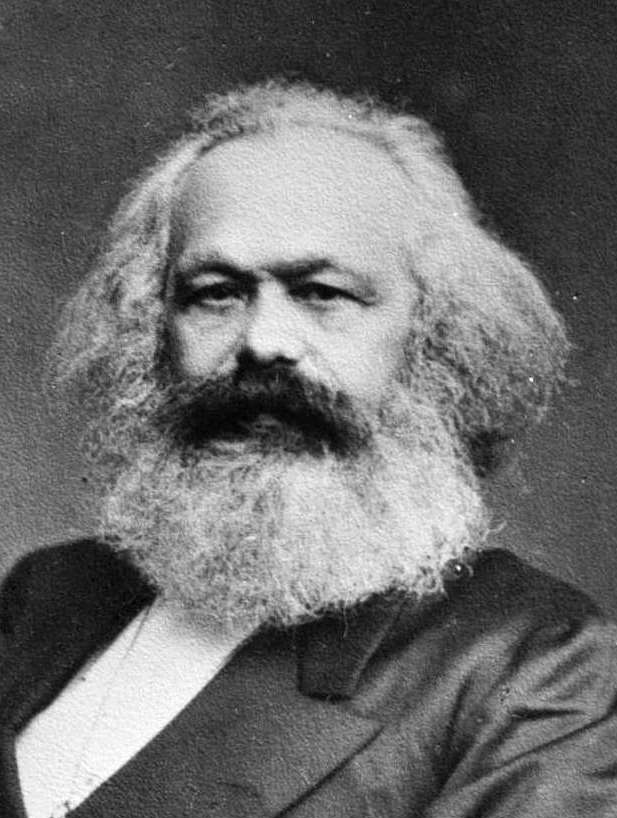
Karl Marx posits that a society's dominant ideology is integral to its superstructure.

Marx's analysis sees ideology as a system of consciousness that arises from economic relationships, reflecting and perpetuating the interests of the dominant class.

In the Marxist base and superstructure model of society, base denotes the relations of production and modes of production, and superstructure denotes the dominant ideology (i.e. religious, legal, political systems). The economic base of production determines the political superstructure of a society. Ruling class-interests determine the superstructure and the nature of the justifying ideology—actions feasible because the ruling class control the means of production. For example, in a feudal mode of production, religious ideology is the most prominent aspect of the superstructure, while in capitalist formations, ideologies such as liberalism and social democracy dominate. Hence the great importance of ideology justifies a society and politically confuses the alienated groups of society via false consciousness. For Marx, ideology acts as a motivation for someone who is exploited or alienated by capitalism to continue to support it despite their interests, often without being aware of the values they hold that have been made to seem natural through ideology. In his book, The Sublime Object of Ideology, Slavoj Žižek quotes Marx in saying, "they do not know it, but they are doing it" as a succinct way of characterizing the false consciousness of ideology. Some explanations have been presented. Antonio Gramsci uses cultural hegemony to explain why the working-class have a false ideological conception of what their best interests are. Marx argued: "The class which has the means of material production at its disposal has control at the same time over the means of mental production."

The Marxist formulation of "ideology as an instrument of social reproduction" is conceptually important to the sociology of knowledge, viz. Karl Mannheim, Daniel Bell, and Jürgen Habermas et al. Moreover, Mannheim has developed and progressed from the "total" but "special" Marxist conception of ideology to a "general" and "total" ideological conception acknowledging that all ideology (including Marxism) resulted from social life, an idea developed by the sociologist Pierre Bourdieu. Slavoj Žižek and the earlier Frankfurt School added to the "general theory" of ideology a psychoanalytic insight that ideologies do not include only conscious but also unconscious ideas.

Teun A. van Dijk has said that "[the term's] everyday usage is largely negative, and typically refers to the rigid, misguided, or partisan ideas of others: we have the truth, and they have ideologies. This negative meaning goes back to Marx-Engels, for whom ideologies were a form of 'false consciousness'".

=== Ideology and the commodity (Debord) ===
The French Marxist theorist Guy Debord, founding member of the Situationist International, argued that when the commodity becomes the "essential category" of society, i.e. when the process of commodification has been consummated to its fullest extent, the image of society propagated by the commodity (as it describes all of life as constituted by notions and objects deriving their value only as commodities tradeable in terms of exchange value), colonizes all of life and reduces society to a mere representation, The Society of the Spectacle.

=== Unifying agents (Hoffer) ===
The American philosopher Eric Hoffer identified several elements that unify followers of a particular ideology:

1. Hatred: "Mass movements can rise and spread without a God, but never without belief in a devil." The "ideal devil" is a foreigner.
2. Imitation: "The less satisfaction we derive from being ourselves, the greater is our desire to be like others…the more we mistrust our judgment and luck, the more are we ready to follow the example of others."
3. Persuasion: The proselytizing zeal of propagandists derives from "a passionate search for something not yet found more than a desire to bestow something we already have."
4. Coercion: Hoffer asserts that violence and fanaticism are interdependent. People forcibly converted to Islamic or communist beliefs become as fanatical as those who did the forcing. He says: "It takes fanatical faith to rationalize our cowardice."
5. Leadership: Without the leader, there is no movement. Often the leader must wait long in the wings until the time is ripe. He calls for sacrifices in the present, to justify his vision of a breathtaking future. The skills required include: audacity, brazenness, iron will, fanatical conviction; passionate hatred, cunning, a delight in symbols; ability to inspire blind faith in the masses; and a group of able lieutenants. Charlatanism is indispensable, and the leader often imitates both friend and foe, "a single-minded fashioning after a model." He will not lead followers towards the "promised land", but only "away from their unwanted selves".
6. Action: Original thoughts are suppressed, and unity encouraged, if the masses are kept occupied through great projects, marches, exploration and industry.
7. Suspicion: "There is prying and spying, tense watching and a tense awareness of being watched." This pathological mistrust goes unchallenged and encourages conformity, not dissent.

=== Ronald Inglehart ===
Ronald Inglehart of the University of Michigan is author of the World Values Survey, which, since 1980, has mapped social attitudes in 100 countries representing 90% of global population. Results indicate that where people live is likely to closely correlate with their ideological beliefs. In much of Africa, South Asia and the Middle East, people prefer traditional beliefs and are less tolerant of liberal values. Protestant Europe, at the other extreme, adheres more to secular beliefs and liberal values. Alone among high-income countries, the United States is exceptional in its adherence to traditional beliefs, in this case Christianity.

== Political ideologies ==
In political science, a political ideology is a certain ethical set of ideals, principles, doctrines, myths, or symbols of a social movement, institution, class, or large group that explains how society should work, offering some political and cultural blueprint for a certain social order. Political ideologies are concerned with many different aspects of a society, including but not limited to: the economy, the government, the environment, education, health care, labor law, criminal law, the justice system, social security and welfare, public policy and administration, foreign policy, rights, freedoms and duties, citizenship, immigration, culture and national identity, military administration, and religion.

Political ideologies have two dimensions:

1. Goals: how society should work; and
2. Methods: the most appropriate ways to achieve the ideal arrangement.

A political ideology largely concerns itself with how to allocate power and to what ends power should be used. Some parties follow a certain ideology very closely, while others may take broad inspiration from a group of related ideologies without specifically embracing any one of them. Each political ideology contains certain ideas on what it considers the best form of government (e.g., democracy, demagogy, theocracy, caliphate etc.), scope of government (e.g. authoritarianism, libertarianism, federalism, etc.) and the best economic system (e.g. capitalism, socialism, etc.). Sometimes the same word is used to identify both an ideology and one of its main ideas. For instance, socialism may refer to an economic system, or it may refer to an ideology that supports that economic system. Post 1991, many commentators claim that we are living in a post-ideological age, in which redemptive, all-encompassing ideologies have failed. This view is often associated with Francis Fukuyama's writings on the end of history. Contrastly, Nienhueser (2011) sees research (in the field of human resource management) as ongoingly "generating ideology".

There are many proposed methods for the classification of political ideologies. Ideologies can identify themselves by their position on the political spectrum (e.g. left, center, or right). They may also be distinguished by single issues around which they may be built (e.g. civil libertarianism, support or opposition to European integration, legalization of marijuana). They may also be distinguished by political strategies (e.g. populism, personalism). The classification of political ideology is difficult, however, due to cultural relativity in definitions. For example, "what Americans now call conservatism much of the world calls liberalism or neoliberalism"; a conservative in Finland might be labeled socialist in the United States.

Philosopher Michael Oakeshott defines single-issue ideologies as "the formalized abridgment of the supposed sub-stratum of the rational truth contained in the tradition". Moreover, Charles Blattberg offers an account that distinguishes political ideologies from political philosophies.

Slavoj Žižek argues how the very notion of post-ideology can enable the deepest, blindest form of ideology. A sort of false consciousness or false cynicism, engaged in for the purpose of lending one's point of view the respect of being objective, pretending neutral cynicism, without truly being so. Rather than help avoiding ideology, this lapse only deepens the commitment to an existing one. Žižek calls this "a post-modernist trap". Peter Sloterdijk advanced the same idea already in 1988.

Studies have shown that political ideology is somewhat genetically heritable.

=== Ideology and state ===
When a political ideology becomes a dominantly pervasive component within a government, one can speak of an ideocracy. Different forms of government use ideology in various ways, not always restricted to politics and society. Certain ideas and schools of thought become favored, or rejected, over others, depending on their compatibility with or use for the reigning social order.

In The Anatomy of Revolution, Crane Brinton said that new ideology spreads when there is discontent with an old regime. The may be repeated during revolutions itself; extremists such as Vladimir Lenin and Robespierre may thus overcome more moderate revolutionaries. This stage is soon followed by Thermidor, a reining back of revolutionary enthusiasm under pragmatists like Napoleon and Joseph Stalin, who bring "normalcy and equilibrium". Brinton's sequence ("men of ideas>fanatics>practical men of action") is reiterated by J. William Fulbright, while a similar form occurs in Eric Hoffer's The True Believer.

== Epistemological ideologies ==
Even when the challenging of existing beliefs is encouraged, as in scientific theories, the dominant paradigm or mindset can prevent certain challenges, theories, or experiments from being advanced. A special case of science that has inspired ideology is ecology, which studies the relationships among living things on Earth. Perceptual psychologist James J. Gibson believed that human perception of ecological relationships was the basis of self-awareness and cognition itself. Linguist George Lakoff has proposed a cognitive science of mathematics wherein even the most fundamental ideas of arithmetic would be seen as consequences or products of human perception—which is itself necessarily evolved within an ecology. Deep ecology and the modern ecology movement (and, to a lesser degree, Green parties) appear to have adopted ecological sciences as a positive ideology.

== Psychological explanations ==
A large amount of research in psychology is concerned with the causes, consequences and content of ideology, with humans being dubbed the "ideological animal" by Althusser. Many theories have tried to explain the existence of ideology in human societies.

Jost, Ledgerwood, and Hardin (2008) propose that ideologies may function as prepackaged units of interpretation that spread because of basic human motives to understand the world, avoid existential threat, and maintain valued interpersonal relationships. The authors conclude that such motives may lead disproportionately to the adoption of system-justifying worldviews. Psychologists generally agree that personality traits, individual difference variables, needs, and ideological beliefs seem to have something in common.

Just-world theory posits that people want to believe in a fair world for a sense of control and security and generate ideologies in order to maintain this belief, for example by justifiying inequality or unfortunate events. A critique of just world theory as a sole explanation of ideology is that it does not explain the differences between ideologies.

Terror management theory posits that ideology is used as a defence mechanism against threats to their worldview which in turn protect and individuals sense of self-esteem and reduce their awareness of mortality. Evidence shows that priming individuals with an awareness of mortality does not cause individuals to respond in ways underpinned by any particular ideology, but rather the ideology that they are currently aware of.

System justification theory posits that people tend to defend existing society, even at times against their interest, which in turn causes people to create ideological explanations to justify the status quo. Jost, Fitzimmons and Kay argue that the motivation to protect a preexisting system is due to a desire for cognitive consistency (being able to think in similar ways over time), reducing uncertainty and reducing effort, illusion of control and fear of equality. According to system justification theory, ideologies reflect (unconscious) motivational processes, as opposed to the view that political convictions always reflect independent and unbiased thinking.

== Ideology and the social sciences ==
=== Semiotic theory ===
According to semiotician Bob Hodge:

[Ideology] identifies a unitary object that incorporates complex sets of meanings with the social agents and processes that produced them. No other term captures this object as well as 'ideology'. Foucault's 'episteme' is too narrow and abstract, not social enough. His 'discourse', popular because it covers some of ideology's terrain with less baggage, is too confined to verbal systems. 'Worldview' is too metaphysical, 'propaganda' too loaded. Despite or because of its contradictions, 'ideology' still plays a key role in semiotics oriented to social, political life.

Authors such as Michael Freeden have also recently incorporated a semantic analysis to the study of ideologies.

=== Sociology ===
Sociologists define ideology as "cultural beliefs that justify particular social arrangements, including patterns of inequality". Dominant groups use these sets of cultural beliefs and practices to justify the systems of inequality that maintain their group's social power over non-dominant groups. Ideologies use a society's symbol system to organize social relations in a hierarchy, with some social identities being superior to other social identities, which are considered inferior. The dominant ideology in a society is passed along through the society's major social institutions, such as the media, the family, education, and religion. As societies changed throughout history, so did the ideologies that justified systems of inequality.

Sociological examples of ideologies include racism, sexism, heterosexism, ableism, and ethnocentrism.

== Quotations ==
- "We do not need…to believe in an ideology. All that is necessary is for each of us to develop our good human qualities. The need for a sense of universal responsibility affects every aspect of modern life." — Dalai Lama
- "The function of ideology is to stabilize and perpetuate dominance through masking or illusion." — Sally Haslanger
- "[A]n ideology differs from a simple opinion in that it claims to possess either the key to history, or the solution for all the 'riddles of the universe,' or the intimate knowledge of the hidden universal laws, which are supposed to rule nature and man." — Hannah Arendt

== See also ==
- -ism – English-language suffix
- Belief § Belief systems
- Dogma – Beliefs accepted by members of a group without question
- Feminism – Range of socio-political movements and ideologies
- Ideocracy – State governed by a particular ideology
- List of communist ideologies – Schools of thought on classless society
- List of ideologies named after people
- State ideology of the Soviet Union
- The Anatomy of Revolution – 1938 book by Crane Brinton
- The True Believer – Book by Eric Hoffer
- World Values Survey – Global research project
- Worldview – Fundamental cognitive orientation of an individual or society
