= Synodal Department for Church Charity and Social Ministry =

Synodal Department of the Russian Orthodox Church

- Formation: 31 January 1991
- Type: Non-governmental organization / Synodal Department of Moscow Patriarchate
- Headquarters: Moscow, Russia
- Bishop: Panteleimon (Shatov) (since March 5, 2010)
- Website: diaconia.ru

Synodal Department for Church Charity and Social Ministry of Russian Orthodox Church (Russian: Синодальный отдел по церковной благотворительности и социальному служению) is one of the Synodal Departments of the Russian Orthodox Church. It conducts the social service activities of the Russian Orthodox Church in Russia and abroad and organizes new social projects.

The department supervises work of more than 3500 church social institutions, projects and initiatives of the Russian Orthodox Church on the territory of Russia and abroad including more than 70 rehabilitation centers for drug addicts, 29 shelters for pregnant women in need, 40 asylums for old people, more than 70 orthodox asylums for homeless, and it coordinates 300 sisterhoods of mercy.

== Mission ==
The goal of the Church Social establishments and all the charitable activities is showing of love, to all people, rendering assistance closer to God, restoration of God's image in people, worn-out by austerity, sufferings, consequences of sins (both one's own and of the whole society).

The goal of the Church Social Work is not to duplicate the system of state social institutions, but to help the state to improve it, to add the spirit of love, faith in action, sacrificial ministry to neighbors, to the society: to offer new technologies, new forms of work. The Church should inspire the initiative of effective timely help, which aims at returning a person to the society, letting him feel the joy of life.

== Activity ==
=== In Russia ===
==== Food help ====
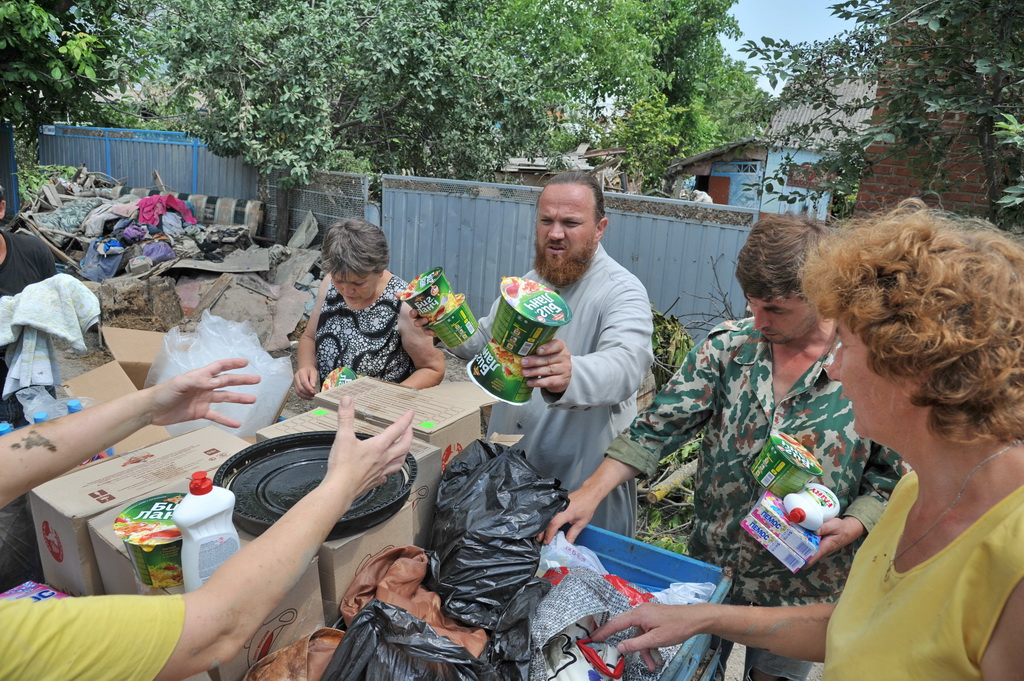
Help to the flood victims in Krymsk

Food bank. Synodal Department supports the first foodbank in Russia created by food fund "Rus" that provides needy people with products all across Russia. By 18.02.2016 it has already distributed 2 018 489 portions of food (that is equivalent to 9277 tons).

==== Help in the cases of emergency ====
- 2010 Russian wildfires:
  - more than 300 cars with humanitarian aid were sent to villages on fire;
  - more than 100 million rubles were gathered to help the victims;
  - 8 thousand volunteers took part in the sorting and dispatch of humanitarian aid;
- Flood in Krymsk in 2012:
  - 20 thousand people got targeted assistance;
  - more than 1 thousand tonnes of humanitarian aid were gathered by Russian Orthodox Church for the victims of the flood;
- Far East floods in 2013:
  - 107,475,693 rubles was gathered to help the victims of the floods;
- Help to Ukrainian refugees and civilians in 2014–2015.

==== Help to drug addicts ====
There are 70 church rehabilitation centers, dozens church consulting rooms, "halfway houses", and other auxiliary services for drug addicts in Russia.

==== Help to single mothers and expectant mothers ====
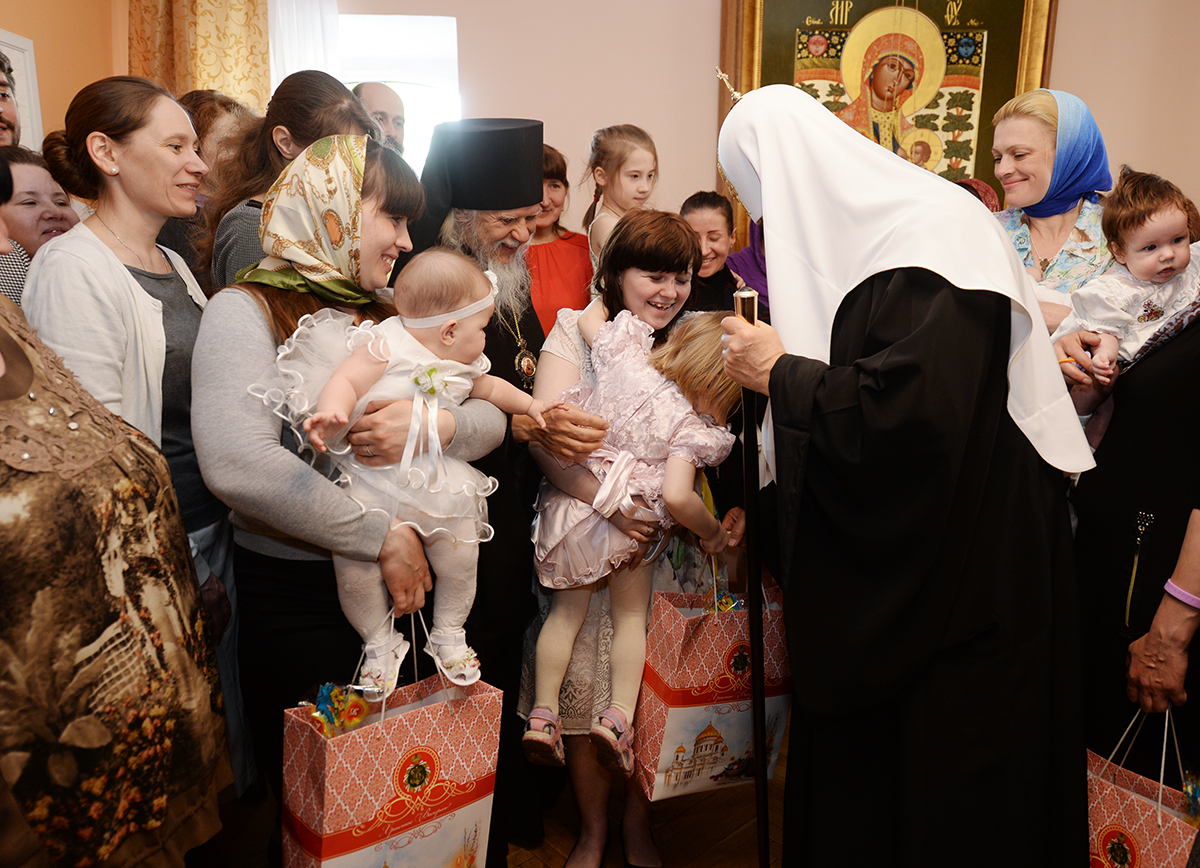
Patriarch Kirill of Moscow visits the "House for mother"

There are 29 church crisis centers with asylums for pregnant women and mothers with children. In Moscow the church shelter "House for mother" was opened in 2013, it provides women with asylum, help of lawyers, psychologists and social workers.

From January 2015 there is a program of anti-abortive consultation "Save the life". Its purpose is to help expectant mothers in difficult situations to save the lives of their children and provide necessary help for mothers with little children. According to official data, during the operating of the program (from January 2015 to March 2016) 2062 lives of children were saved.

==== Help to alcohol-addicted ====
There are 232 orthodox organizations in Russia, including more than 50 rehabilitation centers and parishes, that help alcohol-addicted and their relatives. All in all there are more than 100 communities, brotherhoods and sober groups in Church that are supposed to provide them support.

==== Help to homeless people ====
In Russia there are 72 orthodox shelters for homeless with total capacity 1990 of people, 110 large charity canteens, 56 points of delivery of clothes and 12 "buses of mercy".

==== Help to disabled people ====
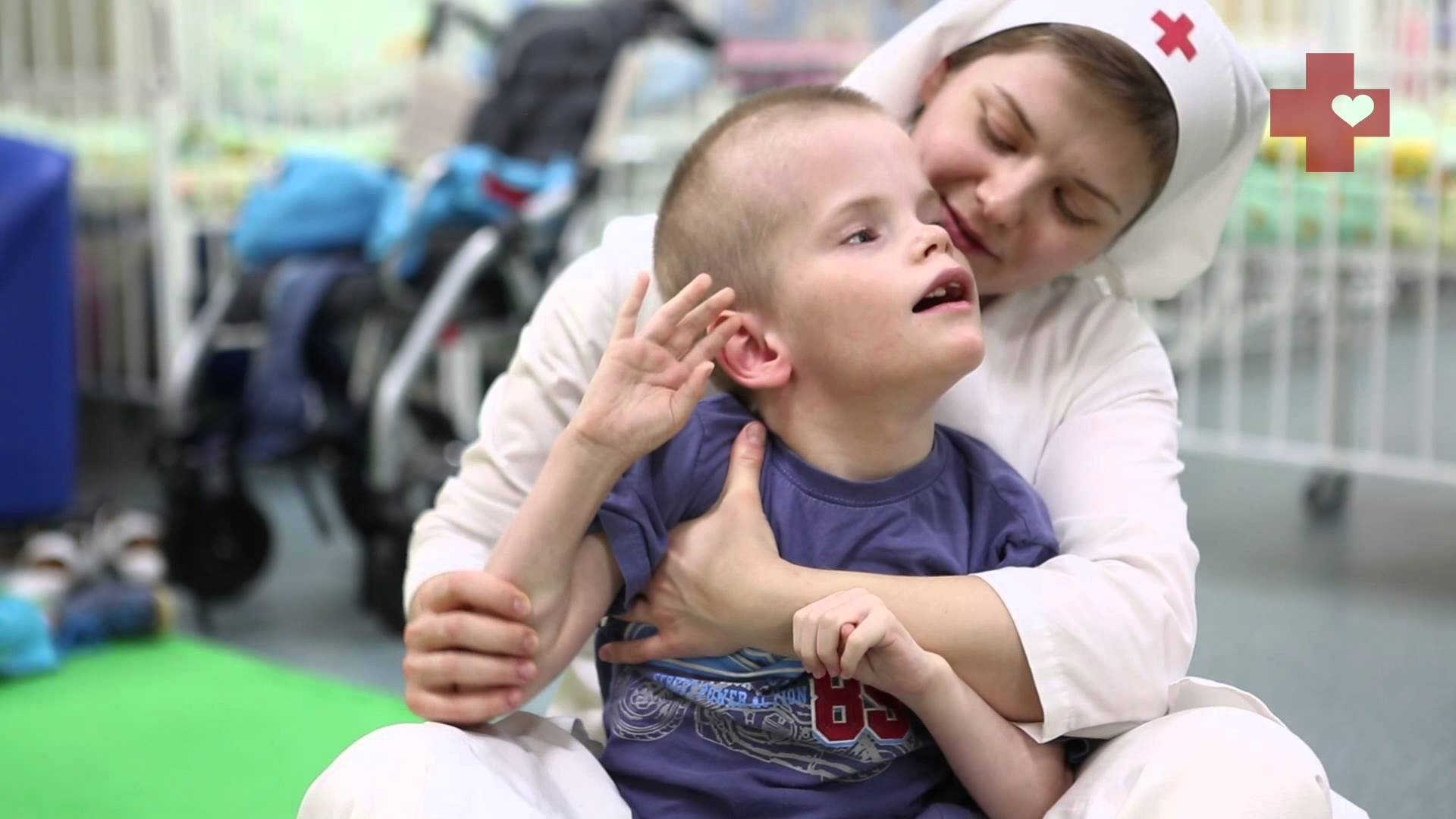
Sisters of Mercy take care of disabled children

Nowadays there are more than 300 orthodox organizations in Russia, which help both children and adults with disabilities. In 50 temples and communities in Russia the work with deaf and hearing-impaired people is carried and in 9 parishes deaf blind people are being nurtured.

==== Help to orphans ====
According to the data of September 2014, the total number of church asylums for orphans is 67. The results of the certification of church asylums in 2013 depict that their graduates are 6 times more likely to get the higher education, comparing to the graduates of state orphanages (30% to 5%), among them 30 times less offenders and alcoholics (1,3 % to 40%), also they have 13 times less divorces (4% to 53%).

In Moscow there is a Family Arranging Centre for orphans and children who have lost parental support. For over four years 233 people (112 families) have graduated from the centre's School for Adoptive Parents , 123 families have received psychological support, legal aid, social and educational help.

From 2011 to August 2015 thanks to the School for Adoptive Parents, more than 69 orphans and children who lost parental support were adopted.

==== Help to elderly people ====
There are more than 40 church asylums for lonely elderly people in the regions of Russia.

=== In the world ===
==== Help of Russian Orthodox Church in emergencies ====
- earthquake and tsunami in Japan 2011 года
- people in need in Greece 2012
- Civilians in Syria 2013
- flood victims in Serbia 2014

== Donations ==
All donations are directed to the functioning of the Department or to the help for people in emergency situations. All the financial statements are published on the official website of the Synodal Department.
