= Russian Authentism =

The eight-rayed rounded swastika, main symbol of Russian Authentism, representing Svarog, the visible manifestation of God as the Milky Way spiral galaxy

Russian Authentism (Russian: Аутентизм), incorporated as the Thesaurus Non-Confessional Spiritual Union (Внеконфессиональный Духовный Союз "Тезаурус"), is a Rodnover (Slavic Neopagan) philosophy and psychological practice originally founded in 1984 by Sergey Petrovich Semyonov (b. 1952) in Saint Petersburg. Semyonov also termed his doctrine Russian Vedism (Русский Ведизм), a name shared by many other currents within Rodnovery. The adherents of the philosophical doctrine are called Authentists, while the core members of the Thesaurus Union are called Thesaurites. The philosophy and practice of the movement are considered as a way to lead humanity to the realisation of its divine nature, its intimate connection with—and even identity with—God.

== Overview ==
=== History ===
Russian Authentism was founded in 1984 by the medical doctor, psychologist and psychotherapist Sergey Petrovich Semyonov, who was born in Saint Petersburg in 1952, and graduated in 1976 at the First Pavlov State Medical University of St. Petersburg, then First Medical Institute of Leningrad. During his medical practice, he became convinced that most chronic diseases are the outcome of wrong lifestyles; therefore, he dedicated himself to the promotion of wellness practices. He gathered a group of acolytes and they studied Eastern religious and health techniques such as vegetarianism, yoga, the thought of Sri Aurobindo, and others. They came to the conclusion that there is no universal healthy lifestyle, since people differ significantly from each other. In the early 1980s, Semyonov discovered the fundamental principle of the need for an individual life to correspond to its own nature, which he called "authenticity". He formed a new group of acolytes with whom he explored the best methods for "authentication", that is to say the process of realisation of authenticity.

In 1984, Semyonov founded the "Studio of Psychic Culture" (Студию психической культуры), which one year later was transformed into the "Leningrad Club of Psychic Culture—World" (Ленинградский клуб психической культуры "Мир"). The organisation was engaged in the dissemination of the doctrine of Russian Authentism and published the samizdat magazines Psychic Culture (Психическая культура) and Kazan Cathedral (Казанский собор). In 1987 the organisation was dissolved by the authorities of the Soviet Union, according to Semyonov for its engagement in politics, but it continued to exist as an underground organisation. The original organisation was focused on the relationship between ethnic groups, especially Russians and Jews, and it was internally organised into the "Rus" and "Sinai" subgroups which tried to find points of intersection between Russian and Jewish cultures in order to overcome the conflict between them. In 1989 there was a split between the two groups, and Semyonov made a choice in favour of the "Rus", which eventually developed into the Thesaurus Union focused exclusively on Russian religious culture.

The ideology of Authentism is presented in a number of publicistic articles and brochures, among which the main ones may be considered Authentism – The Ideology of the Russian Revival (Аутентизм – идеология русского возрождения) and Russia. Russian Order and Russian History (Россия. Русский порядок и русская история). The religious doctrine is presented in a compilation of a cycle of lectures carried out over the years and published under the title Public Sermon of Godmanhood (Публичная проповедь Богочеловечества).

=== Etymology and definition ===
The term "Authentism" derives from the Latin word authenticus, meaning "authentic, self-made, self-consistent", "consistent with one's own true nature". The adherents prefer not to qualify Russian Authentism as a "religion", but rather as a philosophical "worldview" and a psychological practice, a system of ideas which covers everything from healthy lifestyle to all the aspects of human life. Its purpose is to lead an individual to reach the state of "authenticity", which is realised when one discovers that he is not merely a cultural being but an immortal spirit with a divine nature, a spark of God—thus, "authenticity" corresponds to the concept of "godmanhood". The alternative name of the movement, "Russian Vedism", was defined by Sergey P. Semyonov as expressing the "original experience of ascent in the spirit of the Russian people at the end of the Soviet era". Russian Authentism is institutionalised into the psychological order of the Thesaurus Union; the non-professional adepts of Authentism are known as "Authentists" (аутентисты), while the professional psychologists who are members of the Thesaurus Union are called "Thesaurites". The Latin word thesaurus, meaning "treasure", refers to the Russians as the custodians of the idea of the genealogical connection between humanity, reality and God.

The scholar Igor Popov defined Russian Authentism as a synthesis of Slavic paganism, Russian cosmism and psychoanalysis. The scholar Vadim Alekseyev defined the movement as a synthesis of "religious ideas of the East and the West with the personal religious experience of the founder", and as an "eclectic religious system" in which Slavic paganism and Semyonov's own ideas are mixed—by Semyonov's own admission—with Vladimir Solovyov's thought, Carl Jung's theory of the archetypes, Sri Aurobindo's integral yoga, and meditation techniques. Other influences in Russian Authentism are Nikolay Berdyaev, Fyodor Dostoyevsky and Pierre Teilhard de Chardin. Such versatility makes Russian Authentism appealing for a wide range of people from different backgrounds: the semblance of scientificness appeals to former atheists; elements from Eastern thought are accessible to people who already practised yoga; the concept of godmanhood is familiar to those who have an acquaintance with broader Russian religious philosophy; the "Perunic" severity and quasi-militarism of the Thesaurus Union and the political ideas of the doctrine make the movement appealing to young nationalists; lastly, the methods of health improvement are attractive for the elderly. The scholar Alexey V. Gaidukov found that Russian Authentism is a complex philosophical system applicable to different fields of thought and practice; it is "difficult for the uninitiated" and distinguished by a precisely defined attitude towards other religions. The purpose of the movement as a whole is the construction of a civilisation of godmen, through personal improvement and active participation in the transformation of society.

== Beliefs and practices ==
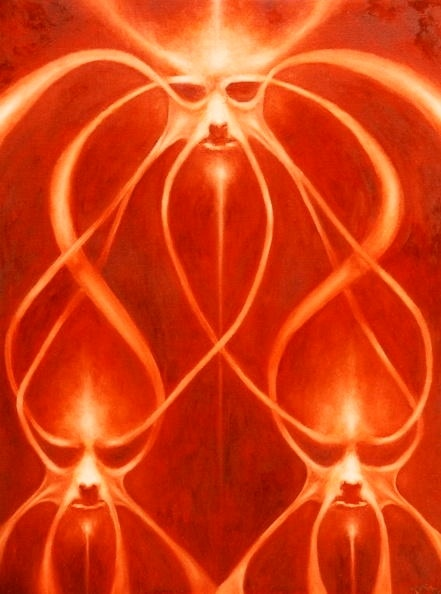
Trifixion by the Dutch artist Jeroen van Valkenburg, 1999, representing the triune essence of God

Russian Authentism tries to synthesise all aspects of human experience, chiefly politics, philosophy and medicine, into a single system. The aim of Russian Authentism is to reveal mankind's true spiritual essence, which is identical with God, Rod (Род, "Begetter")—which is viewed as the complementary unity of Belobog-Svetovid and Chernobog-Veles—and therefore the aim is ultimately the unity of mankind and God, a work which is the mission of the Russians as carriers of the idea of God opposed to Western materialism and individualism.

=== Theology: God and the gods as mental aggregates ===
Representation of the theo-cosmology of Russian Authentism

All the gods exist within the supreme Rod, and articulate in complementary dualities which reflect the supreme duality of Rod itself, its two primary faces: its bright celestial facet Belobog ("White God") or Svetovid ("Lord of Holiness"), and its dark terrestrial facet Chernobog ("Black God") or Veles ("Lord of Will", according to Semyonov's etymological interpretation). The supreme God unites in itself all the natural processes of life and death, collectively represented by Belobog and Chernobog.

The Russian Authentists believe that the gods are made up by human beings united in meditation and identification; they are supra-individual beings constituted by the collective minds of human beings—similar to the concept of egregore or tulpa. Each one of these supra-individual entities has a "zone of responsibility". They are the gods of villages, cities, nations, planets, galaxies and supergalaxies, and the saints representing archetypes of human characters or God's plan for specific individual persons. Some of them are benevolent deities, while others are malevolent demons, and they all may act by influencing the elements of the cosmos. Individual persons may meditatively connect with these supra-individual entities, and their communication with them would have effects on all the other individuals connected to the same entity.

Gods such as Perun and Mokosh are therefore regarded by the Russian Authentists as real entities, but since these collective entities exist through the "substantial connection of many individuals", they cease to exist without the individuals' participation. The gods, or spirits, are described as the many facets of reality, of God itself, whose function is to help individuals and communities to turn to God and unify themselves with its reality field.

=== Eschatology: Godman and Devilman ===
In the Russian Authentist worldview, the purpose of human history is set in the future and all human life tends towards such purpose, which is the full realisation of "godmanhood" (богочеловечество, bogochelovechestvo)—that is to say the identification of humanity and divinity, of man and God—and the organisation of those humans who have realised godmanhood into a form of civilisation which is a reflection of the "Planetary Intelligence" (Планетарный Разум, Planetarny Razum) on Earth. As Semyonov himself explained:

Life is purposefulness, purposeful Being, and the essence of life and of human nature is rooted in the future, which is godmanhood – a new type of organisation of life on Earth, at whose core is the Planetary Intelligence.

— S. P. Semyonov, Authentism. Key distinctive ideas and concepts (Аутентизм. Основные отличительные понятия и концепции), 1998.

The purpose of human history is realised through a meditative connection of the individual persons with their ancestors in the past—through the tracing of ancestral continuity and therefore the return of the individuals to their true roots—, and then through the union of authenticated individual persons with each other into a supra-individual collective being, a good collective "Godman" (Вогочеловек, Bogochelovek). The possibility to unite within this collective Godman would be available to anyone in the present epoch. At the same time, another supra-individual collective being would be forming by uniting all those who reject the good Godman and live by nurturing the selfish part of the human nature; it is the evil "Devilman" (Дьяволочеловек, D'yavolochelovek). The Godman and the Devilman have not to be confused with the dual expression of God, Belobog and Chernobog; especially, the Devilman is not Chernobog, the collective personification of the principles of destruction which are part of the cycle of nature, since the essence of the Devilman is completely outside and against nature in both its aspects of life and death.

Russia has a special role in the eschatology of Authentism: according to the believers, it is the civilisation where the Godman is taking form, and, as the Godman's stronghold, the Russian people are bearers of the idea of the genealogical connection between humanity and divinity and possess spiritual and psychological characteristics which express their connection with divinity; the Russians are the treasury (thesaurus) carrying the idea of godmanhood. According to Authentist eschatology, the Russians will contribute to the rebirth of true humanism in the civilisations of the entire world, unifying all humanity into the civilisation of godmanhood and all earthly life into a single organism, the "God of the Earth" (Бог Земли, Bog Zemli), vanquishing the Western civilisation built upon individualism.

Western society built upon individualism would be the utter contradiction of Russian Authentism, not promoting the unification of mankind in godmanhood but rather promoting egoistic isolation of individuals and communities and at the same time the coalescence only of evil egoistic interests. Modern Western civilisation is characterised by the Russian Authentists as a "subhuman" and "animal" organisation which promotes "anticulture" and "pornoculture", which develops inhumanity while oppressing true human qualities, and whose further existence is detrimental to the Earth. Such system of "consumeristic perversion of man" lives through the machinery of the states by both extorting money from taxpayers and depleting the resources of the environment, also enforcing a separation between rich and poor, and weakening and eroding true culture while denationalising and deterritorialising entire peoples. Western organisation is ultimately the modality of life of "devilmanhood" (дьяволочеловечество, d'yavolochelovechestvo). As an alternative to Western civilisation, the Russian Authentists propose a "humanistic transformation" involving the refusal to stimulate and satisfy growing needs, a reorientation of human development through the restructuration of social relationships and of social production with the abolition of the principle of enrichment. Changes happen through qualitative leaps, similarly to how a caterpillar pupates for turning into a butterfly; according to the Russian Authentists, such transformation of the world is naturally happening in the contemporary epoch, when the Earth is transitioning from the self-destroying civilisation of consumption activity to the civilisation of godmanhood. Such civliisation of godmanhood should be based on what the Authentists consider the "essential Russian principle" of sobornost (собо́рность, "spiritual community").

=== Authentication towards godmanhood ===
Symbol of godmanhood, that is to say of mankind harmonised with God

The discovery of one's true divine essence is a state called "authenticity", and it is reached through a process known as "authentication" (аутентикация, autentikatsiya); as it coincides with the identification with God, authenticity is the same as godmanhood. The path of authentication is complex, as a person may be isolated from the context—"from the fabric of the entire universe"—only with a great deal of convention. The Russian Authentists define the concept of "person" as follows:

A person is the world converged into an individual history.

— S. P. Semyonov, Authentism. Key distinctive ideas and concepts (Аутентизм. Основные отличительные понятия и концепции), 1998.

Therefore, the Russian Authentists link the psychological state of an individual person with the social processes taking place in the whole world. Semyonov and his followers came to the understanding that the painful state of modern humanity is due to the state of crisis of society and worldwide civilisation, degenerated by the evil Western model.

Authentication—the return to one's true self—is a spiritual healing process, and, in order to undergo it, the practitioner is introduced to a certain religious worldview and to certain therapeutic techniques which include acupuncture, meditation, medical phonogramology, and other medical and psychological techniques practised at the "Vita" Authentist health centres. The path of authentication may be conditionally divided into several stages of self-determination, that is to say of conscious formation and alteration of oneself. During the process, different planes of being are revealed to the practitioner; navigation through these levels is possible with the meditative psychotechnics developed by Semyonov, which provide the practitioner with the sight of the spiritual organisation of reality and of the harmony and integrity of all being. Meditation is practised either individually or collectively, guided by a spiritual master. During collective sessions, which are held at certain appointed times by Thesaurites, the practitioners are connected on the substantial spiritual level with each other and with the future Godman, as well as with outstanding mystics and ascetics of all times and places.

The task of a Russian Authentist practitioner is to use the power of the gods on the path to godmanhood, that is to say to strive for the harmonisation of the parts of his individual soul and for the harmonisation of his individual being with the spirits of the surrounding world. Semyonov emphasised the importance in the path of authentication of the worship of traditional gods and ancestors, of the use of traditional clothes, and of the use of native lexicon in speech, recovering words of Old Church Slavonic, "semantic and sound fields of the language of the ancestors". The scholar Alexey V. Gaidukov described the lexicon of Semyonov and Russian Authentists as characterised by the use of "archaisms which have long gone out of speech". Like other Rodnovers, Russian Authentists also use, especially for introducing prayers, conspiracies, spells, and hymns to the gods, holy sounds and syllables considered to be Slavic and Aryan lexical heritage, such as Goy!, (Гой!), Sva! (Сва!) and Svarr! (Сварр!). The latter is exclaimed in salutes exchanged with other believers, accompanied by the gesture of raising the right hand with open palm.

== Sociology ==
=== Russian Authentist organisations ===
The Thesaurus Union is an order of psychologists who profess the doctrine of Russian Authentism. Beyond the Thesaurites—the core members of the order—there are a number of "associates", that is to say psychologists who are merely sympathisers interested in the movement. The order has been described by the scholar Vadim Alekseyev as a group very closed to outsiders. While the Thesaurus Union is not recognised as a religious organisation by the Russian government, in the 1990s it established educational, cultural, medical and political ancillary organisations devoted to the creation of the civilisation of "godmanhood", all of which are led by Semyonov and are recognised by the government. In 1989 were founded the voluntary society "Oasis" (Оазис), the medical cooperative "Vita" (Вита) and the Russian Liberation Movement (Русское освободительное движение), while in 1990 were founded the Humanist Party of Russia (Гуманистическая партия России), the International Coalition "For Humanism!" (Международной Коалиции "За Гуманизм!"), and the Russian Art Foundation (Фонд Русского Искусства). Other organisations of Authentism are the society "Russes" (Россы), "Femina" (Фемина), the Party of Russian Statehood (Партии русской государственности), and the Humanist Youth Union (Гуманистический союз молодежи). According to Alekseyev, such abundance of affiliated organisations provides various ways for political and economic influence. The latter is encouraged as a necessary thing by the Russian Authentists, as the world of society and the individual person, and mankind and the environment, are seen as inextricably linked, or even as one and the same entity.

=== Political views and interethnic relations ===
In 1998, the scholar Victor Shnirelman described the political ancillary organisation of Authentism, the Russian Liberation Movement (RLM), as the only Rodnover political movement in Russia at that time whose program did not include extreme antisemitism and which recognised the Russian nation as a multiethnic community. Reflecting these views, the name of the organisation was later changed to Russian Public Movement (RPM). The movement protested the perceived genocide of the ethnic Russians and of the other ethnic groups of Russia carried out by both "false democracies" and "extreme racists", respected any ethnic traditions and denied the presence among its ranks and in the Russian nation of nationalism and chauvinism.

At the same time, the Russian Public Movement recognised the importance of the preservation of the religious traditions of the "indigenous peoples" of Russia, the Russian Orthodox Church, Islam, and Buddhism, but did not include Judaism among them. Sergey P. Semyonov stated that one of the obstacles for the realisation of the Russian future and of worldwide godmanhood is the supremacy of the "transnational financial oligarchy", to which it attributed Jewish roots and which he regarded as based on the ideology of worldwide Zionism. He also saw Jewish roots in Marxism and espoused the idea popular among many Russian nationalists that the Jews seized power in the 1917 Russian Revolution, launched the genocide of the Russian ethnic groups, and took part in the democratic reforms. He also expressed that Christianity has obvious "Jewish traits" which do not fit the character of the Russian people.

Semyonov ultimately distanced himself from antisemitism but welcomed anti-Zionism in the Russian Public Movement, while stating that the movement did not represent a "danger for normal Jews or even Orthodox Jews" but that the "spiritual substances" of Jews and Russians did not fit together and thence there should be no place for Jews in the Russian governmental structure. Semyonov avoided any open admiration for Adolf Hitler, but allowed that there were some "benefits" in German National Socialism.

== Symbolism ==
The most important symbol used by Russian Authentists is an eight-rayed rounded swastika, which in its two-rayed version is considered to be a symbol of Svarog, the heaven god, the main physical manifestation of Rod; it is often drawn in bright colours on a dark blue background, representing the Milky Way in the night sky. The swastika in its many variants is considered by Russian Authentists, as by other Rodnovers, to be the foremost symbol of the Russians and of all the Aryan peoples. A swastika composed of three acute-angled hooks is considered the symbol of Perun, the thunder god; it functions as the symbol of the Russian Liberation Movement, the main political arm of Russian Authentism. Another symbol is the equal-armed cross, associated by the Authentists to Khors, the solar god. Other symbols include a stylised representation of the Earth, the physical body of Gey (another name of Mokosh), the earth goddess, and icons depicting the mother goddess holding a baby, the latter being a symbol of the saviour Godman and his saintly followers. The five-pointed star is considered a symbol of mankind, regarded as the stylised figure of the human being itself; it may be bright or dark to signify either the Godman or the Devilman.

== See also ==
- Rodnovery
  - Ivanovism
  - Levashovism
  - Peterburgian Vedism
- Russian cosmism
- Psychoanalysis
- Carl Jung
- Sri Aurobindo
- Vladimir Solovyov
