= Vseyasvetnaya Gramota =

Branch of Rodnovery

The emblem of VG

Vseyasvetnaya Gramota (Russian: Всеясветная Грамота; literally "Universal Script", "Universal Alphabet" or "Worldwide Writing"; acronym: ВГ, VG) is a Rodnover (Slavic Neopagan) movement based on an elaborate doctrine of esoteric linguistics or natural philosophical linguistics, holding that there is a continuity between language, script, the cosmos and God, corroborated by the etymological relation that in East Slavic languages exists between yazychnik, "pagan", and yazyk, "language". The movement was begun in Russia by Anany Shubin-Abramov (1938–2019) in the 1980s, and was later incorporated as a homonymous public organisation.

The adherents of the movement are known as Vseyasvetniks, but they also call themselves—as the founder himself did—Orthodox. They believe that the Vseyasvetnaya Gramota is an ancient, primordial script which gave rise to all the other writing systems of the world; a "magical script" whose letters are representations of multidimensional divine archetypes manifesting as entities and events, proving that the world is divinely designed by God, and providing means to work with the universe. The Cyrillic script and especially its ancestors, the Old Church Slavonic and Glagolitic scripts, are considered to have preserved some magical properties of the original Vseyasvetnaya Gramota of which they would be simplified descendants.

== Overview ==
=== History ===
Anany Shubin-Abramov (1938–2019) was the leader and founder of the movement of Vseyasvetnaya Gramota, who set out the doctrine in the Bukovnik ("The Book of Letters") and in over one hundred Vseyasvetnik bulletins. According to controversial narratives, Abramov began to spread the doctrine in 1979 proclaiming himself as a descendant of the boyar kin of the Shubins, who would have decided to disclose the doctrine—previously held as a family secret—to save humanity from its current decayed state. Shubin-Abramov also claimed to be connected to secret psychic military projects, in particular mentioning the military unit 10003 and General Alexey Savin.

Between the late 1980s and the early 1990s, various Vseyasvetnik ideologists began to emerge and propagate their ideas. According to the scholar Kaarina Aitamurto, the movement was actually formed in this period, by Shubin-Abramov in collaboration with Nina Belyakova. After the end of the Soviet Union, Vseyasvetnaya Gramota spread through conferences, lectures and classes to study the Bukovnik, the doctrine was systematised and a number of practices took form. At the same time, many mainstream Rodnover organisations began to reject the doctrine, which nonetheless remained popular throughout the 2010s. The Peterburgian Vedists Oleg Gusev and Roman Perin continued to support Vseyasvetnaya Gramota. During the 2000s and the 2010s, various regional communities of Vseyasvetniks were founded, and they began to organise various activities, for example regular meetings at the museum of the artist Konstantin Vasilyev in Moscow, which is a landmark of the Rodnover movement.

=== Academic definition ===
According to the scholar Svetlana Tambovtseva, although it is an autochthonous Russian or Slavic movement, the roots of Vseyasvetnaya Gramota sink into a rich European philosophical and esoteric ground which goes back to the Renaissance. The movement was also influenced by Russian cosmism. The Vseyasvetnik letters are ontologised, seen as archetypal geometrical figures and are interpreted through a numerical symbolism; Vseyasvetnaya Gramota thus provides a hermeneutic model for interpreting the world comparable to that of Jewish Kabbalah, which was introduced into Russia by Vladimir Solovyov. Tambovtseva also defined Vseyasvetnaya Gramota as a philological project, as it strives to reconstruct a primordial language, repairing modern "corrupt" language and writing systems, by building a new type of semiotics; such applied philology is of a cosmic scale, as the world order and human history are believed by Vseyasvetniks to be regulated linguistically. This project, according to Tambovtseva, can be inscribed in one of the most ambitious cultural trends in European culture, that is to say what Umberto Eco described as "the search for the perfect language"; a Russian "grassroots philology" which has absorbed pan-European linguistic nationalism, as the Vseyasvetniks believe that the Slavs are the root nation from which all the European peoples descended.

According to Tambovtseva, the letters of Vseyasvetnaya Gramota resemble the uncial and semi-uncial Cyrillic lettering used in the 19th-century Russian Empire, prior to reforms of the writing system, and some of them keep Church Slavonic names. According to Karina Y. Povstyeva, they recover ancient graphic principles of the Cyrillic tradition combined with a new "esoteric ornamentalisation". They also show some similarities with other systems of Slavic or Russian runes (runitsa), and especially with the velesovitsa, the writing system of the alleged original version of the Book of Veles, a 19th- or 20th-century literary composition which is widely popular among Rodnovers, which could have inspired the emergence of the Vseyasvetnik system. In the movement's practices, scholars have observed possible influences from the George Gurdjieff's Fourth Way and Rudolf Steiner's Anthroposophy, and similarities with Eastern spiritual medicine. For its sacralisation of some works of Russian literature, Vseyasvetnaya Gramota has been compared to Bazhovism, another Russian Rodnover movement built on a similar operation.

== Beliefs ==
=== God and the divine letters ===
The word Rus (Русь) written in VG letters: the first letter is the "seed of the tree of thought" or of the "spinal cord"; the second letter represents the "heavenly people"; the third letter represents the "union of heavenly and earthly forces"; the fourth and last letter means the "creation of new universes". The word Rus is central to the movement as it indicates the kin who originally received VG from God and the cosmic force they convey, the "unifying and founding principle of all the types of matter evolving into cosmoses and becoming universes".

The supreme God of Heaven of Vseyasvetnik theology is the concept of supreme God of ancient Egyptian religion, Ra. Vseyasvetnik adepts believe that the letters of their script were given to humanity by God about seven-thousand five-hundred years ago as a Vedic "universal knowledge" (vseyasvetnoye znaniye), carried by a kin, the Aryan Rus, who later spread throughout the Earth and disseminated it. "Rus" indicates at the same time the luminous cosmic force which gives shape to matter and organises the universe, and the original human kin who received it; "Aryan" indicates the right modality of life taught by the Rus kin.

Humanity has a single divine spirit, which expresses itself in an original language and in the divine letters which codify it. The letters are multidimensional devices which allow a cooperation with the universal order of God. They represent ontological, transcendental "bioenergetic" divine archetypes which manifest themselves as natural phenomena, human physiology and universal processes, thereby proving the providential design of the universe and the dynamics of its creation. Modern alphabets are degenerated versions of the original letters which have lost spatial multidimensionality and have become plane, a historical process which led to a loss of knowledge, connection with reality and power to cooperate with God.

The total number of Vseyasvetnik letters is 147. Each one of the letters has its own esoteric meaning, allowing to read any word as an acronym and to interpret such word's hidden meaning. The rotation of the Vseyasvetnik letters from different angles changes their meaning, a belief analogous to that found in other systems of "Russian runes" emerged since the 1990s. Both the sound and the outline of the letters represent their meaning. The system of interpretation is thus phonosemantic, but semiotisation also involves objects and the human body: almost all the Vseyasvetnik letters correspond to "bodily poetics", that is to say bodily positions mimicking the outline of each letter, which are believed to provide harmonisation with the rhythms of the universe. According to Tambovtseva, this iconic interpretation of the letters is aesthetically inspired to the illustrative tradition of medieval figurative alphabets, for example the works by Karion Istomin.

Tambovtseva observed that the doctrine of Vseyasvetnaya Gramota is based on an irregular semiotic system in which the sign can belong simultaneously to three different types of the Pericean triad: iconic, indexal, and symbolic. The conventionality of the signs is discarded, and they reveal themselves as "natural"; metaphorically or metonymically connected with the natural world, which is ultimately the source of the original language and primordial system of signs itself. Tambovtseva called this view "natural philosophical linguistics".

Everything around, and nicks and notches on birch trees, and the forms of scales, flowers, and feet of insects and other living creatures, as well as the rainbow, halo, and other light-woven formations, reflect the letters, syllables, and even the words of the Worldwide Alphabet.

— VG Bulletin n. 130, 7504, 4

Only one among the Vseyasvetnik letters is considered negative, the letter zelo, which means "sunset without subsequent sunrise" and resembles the Latin letter S, iconically representing a snake; such letter is present in words for things and practices considered evil by the Vseyasvetniks. It is considered the opposite letter to that resembling the Latin letter C, which represents the "connection of heavenly and earthly forces". In medieval art the snake represents sin, and the fight against it represents the psychomachia, the fight against evil within one's own soul; this symbolism is reinterpreted by Vseyasvetniks so that language in its written form is the main battlefield between good and evil.

=== Cosmology ===
Various creative forms made with VG letters

According to Vseyasvetnik cosmology, the universe is a "creative spiral" of the luminous Rus, and such configuration is reflected in all entities, and especially in the form of many beech (buk) trees, a tree used as a symbol of all reality in Vseyasvetnaya Gramota; "beech" is a metaphor for "letter" and for the original "script" of Vseyasvetnaya Gramota itself. The same word for "universe" used by the movement, vseyasvet, expresses the idea that everything within the spiral is made of light: vse means "all", ya is the first person singular of the verb "be", and svet means "light"; entities manifest from the light of heavenly bodies governing them within the universe. The Earth is regarded as "a speck of dust in the universal Rus".

The letters themselves live in this universal "Spirit-Mind" (Dukh-Razum), similar to both Carl Jung's "collective unconscious" and Vladimir Vernadsky's "noosphere". The spiral structure is also that of language and of the single words themselves, the minimal semantic units of language. An analogous belief is also found in the thought of the Orthodox Christian theologian Pavel Florensky. Letters possessing a spiral outline are often arranged by the Vseyasvetniks in motifs which emphasise the configuration of the universe.

The Vseyasvetniks also mythologise as Lukomorye the "supra-real" world where the universal "codes of construction" live in their perfection. Baba Yaga is believed to bring "gifted" children to this world, where they are raised by observation and imitation of the animals living there and are taught the wisdom of Vseyasvetnaya Gramota. Contrarily to her character in traditional Russian folk tales, in Vseyasvetnik mythology Baba Yaga is not a malevolent goddess but she is a bearer of the "genealogical knowledge" of Vseyasvetnaya Gramota and helps children to return to the origins of the world; tales which portray her as malevolent are considered false by the Vseyasvetniks. Lukomorye does not have a specific location but it is believed to be interspersed throughout reality. The real and the supra-real world intersect in some places and during some events, such as in some parks which "reify" Lukomorye—for example, the Pushkin Museum Mikhailovskoye—and during the ceremonies held by Vaseyasvetniks.

=== Eschatology ===
The eschatology of Vseyasvetnaya Gramota holds that contemporary humanity is on the verge of total decay as in the world there is no more distinction between good and evil. Contemporary decadence is the product of the gradual simplification of the original divine script and the reduction of the number of its characters, which occurred during history and reflected itself in a gradual shrinking of the possibilities of human thought and expression, a detachment of language from reality, consequently a loss of esoteric knowledge and power to orchestrate reality co-working with the "fundamental principles" of the order of God, and ultimately a loss of connection with God itself. According to the Vseyasvetniks, modern alphabets, including modern Russian Cyrillic, have degenerated into random combinations of signs to represent words, which actually distort the original meaning of words and hinder the true and thorough understanding of reality. Humanity would be doomed to destruction if it fails to "continue the work of God-maintaining".

The process of detachment of language from reality due to the degeneration of writing systems is, according to Vseyasvetnik doctrine, the cause of human suffering, which manifests itself in the abuse of drugs and alcohol and in sexual pathologies. According to many adherents of the movement, this degeneration would be orchestrated by the Jews, and the leading power supporting it would be the United States of America. The only hope to save humanity from total catastrophe would be the recovery of ancient wisdom, which began with the unveiling of Vseyasvetnaya Gramota. According to Tambovtseva, Vseyasvetnik eschatology, with its emphasis on etymology, provides an "ordering effect opposing the entropy of historical processes"; the return to the primordial language is thought to be a means of "salvation from history".

== Practices ==
=== Prayer and bodily poetics ===
Vseyasvetniks hold daily collective prayers in the morning. They practise onomatodoxy (imiaslavie), the glorification of the name of God which is "reified" and considered divine in itself. Such practice, similar to Kabbalistic ones and originated in hesychasm, was widespread on Mount Athos, Greece, in the early 20th century, but was banned by the Russian Orthodox Church in 1913. It was also popular among Russian Spiritual Christians such as the Khlysts.

During the morning prayers a system of "mental and corporeal gymnastics", also called "Russian yoga", based on the letters' "bodily poetics", is also practised. The accuracy of such movements, which are likened to "writing with the body", is strongly emphasised. According to Tambovtseva, these practices are similar to those theorised in the 19th century by Pyotr Uspensky, a disciple of George Gurdjieff's Fourth Way, and are also similar to the eurythmy practised by the adepts of Rudolf Steiner's Anthroposophy. In the parallelism between the shape of each letter and parts or positions of the human body, Karina Y. Povstyeva saw similarities with Eastern spiritual traditional medicine. The Vseyasvetnik movement has its own chronology of history, and the beginning of the New Year is celebrated in early September.

=== Magic and linguistic orthopraxy ===
The letters of Vseyasvetnaya Gramota have limited application, and they or complex inscriptions made with them are mainly used decoratively and apotropaically: they are used for the organisation of space in a kind of Slavic fengshui, they are sewn on clothes, they are glued on the backlite of cars, they are dyed on roads, and they are drawn on dishes or other kitchen utensils. The letters denote themselves, and they mark people and things as a corporate "belonging" to the archetype represented by the letter itself.

As divine archetypal forms, the letters are also used for magical purposes, to interpret abbreviations or to make acrostic forms which combine the metaphysical understanding of each of the letters into long attributive constructs, containing the indication of the subject, object, purpose and mode of action of the text. Thought, where the letters live and of which the letters are vehicles, is believed to be material, or better to be form giving shape to matter, as form does not exist without matter and matter presupposes form. For instance, Tambovtseva attended the recitation of a poem glorifying Vladimir Putin in which, according to the Vseyasvetnik interpretation, his surname was considered to contain the image of the man who draws the "heavenly ways" (put') and therefore he was portrayed as the man who was looking for "ways to save the Earth".

The letter on the plane projects the process of materialization, i.e., the creation of matter. We say, remember, the world is material [...], so we do magic.

— Workshop "Multidimensional Writing" (Mnogomernoye pis'mo), 20 August 2019

Vseyasvetnaya Gramota also proposes a standard literary language, the observance of which is strictly controlled in everyday speech. This proper speech is not only free from foreign lexemes (post-Soviet borrowings, especially from the English language), but in some cases also rejects conventional word usage in favour of peculiar made-up variants. Special attention is drawn to the use of intransitive reflexive verbs and negative particles, and the language is literalised and bereft of idiomatic constructions. Destructive and nonsense language is strictly forbidden. This linguistic moderation—benevolent but insistent—is partly rooted in the Vseyasvetnik psychology which connects thoughts and words to their bodily "materialisations". The Vseyasvetniks also emphasise an orthography in which significant words contain capital letters to highlight their composite form and therefore their hidden meanings (for example, VseYaSvet). Numerous Vseyasvetnik bulletins are dedicated to the practice of education and didactics, instructing how parents should correctly raise their children and "competently" transmit the sacred linguistic knowledge to them according to the method of Lukomorye.

=== Sacralisation of Russian literature ===
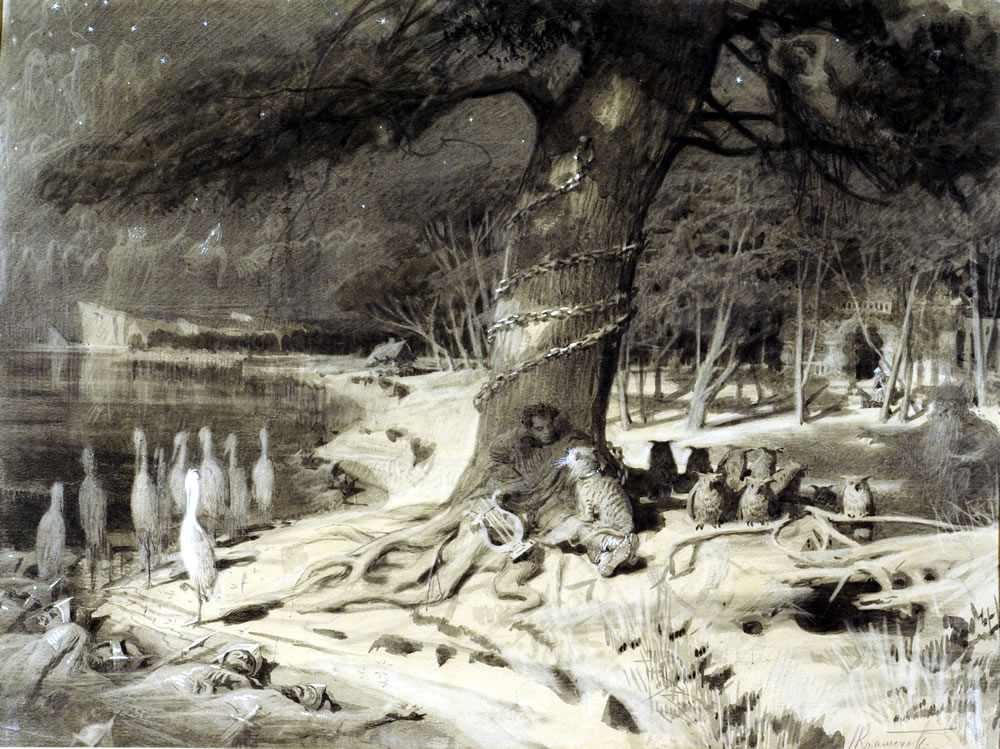
Illustration of the prologue of Pushkin's Ruslan and Lyudmila, showing the oak of Lukomorye. Watercolour on whitewashed paper by Ivan Kramskoy, 1879.

Various works of Russian literature, notably fairy tales, are considered by the Vseyasvetniks to have an esoteric and magical undertext, and are therefore studied within the movement; they include: Ruslan and Lyudmila by Alexander Pushkin, The Little Humpbacked Horse by Pyotr Pavlovich Yershov, and folk Russian tales such as At the Pike's Behest. The texts are believed to be formulations of the ancient sacred knowledge, their characters to be carriers of such knowledge, and their authors to be initiates to such knowledge. For instance, the horse in The Little Humpbacked Horse is considered a symbol of connection to the "higher powers", following the symbolism that such animal has in ancient Slavic, Aryan and Indian mythologies; Emelya of At the Pike's Behest is interpreted as the "fool" (actually a carrier of wisdom protected by the divine) who, by talking with the pike, learns how to get rid of the tricks of technology and shows to people the right way to live in harmony with nature, and thus reveals himself as a continuator of the "deed of God the Creator".

Pushkin in particular is regarded as a prophet of Vseyasvetnaya Gramota and one who foresaw the catastrophe to which evil American democracy would have led the world; he would have been initiated by his nanny Arina Rodionovna. According to the mythology of the movement, Pushkin wrote secret Diaries of Taganrog in which he expounded the necessity to spread Vseyasvetnaya Gramota to save humanity, by forming "complete men" who could create a new "Aryan" community which would unify Europe. By fulfilling this order, the Vseyasvetniks believe to be continuing not only the work of God, but also the legacy of Pushkin.

The first line of Ruslan and Lyudmila is regarded as a manifesto of the movement:

Lukomorye has a green oak.

Another motto of the movement is a phrase expressed by John of Kronstadt:

In Heaven there is a kingdom; in hell there is democracy.

In the texts of the movement, Pushkin is likened to an "electron" who has brought "energy" to the Earth, a "Sun" whom also represents a "literary criterion" for judging other authors within the framework of Vseyasvetnaya Gramota. The "antipodes" of Pushkin and of his sacred themes are considered Joseph Brodsky, Vladimir Vysotsky and Andrey Voznesensky; these authors are believed to politicise, spoil and invert the sacred themes of Pushkin's literature—friendship, love, transience of life, and sacrality of nature—which are fundamental to the idea of world harmony of Vseyasvetnaya Gramota.

== Demographics and political ideas ==
The scholar Svetlana Tambovtseva estimated that in 2019, based on the number of members in associated internet VK groups, Vseyasvetnaya Gramota had between 7.000 and 11.000 adherents. Based on the participants at the Vseyasvetnik congresses held in Kostroma Oblast in 2017 and 2019, Tambovtseva observed that the regional, educational and gender background of adherents were mixed. They came from various places, including Moscow and Saint Petersburg, Ural and Siberian cities, and smaller towns, as well as from post-Soviet countries including Lithuania, Belarus and Kazakhstan. The leading roles at the congresses were held by elderly women, mainly provincial school teachers. The Vseyasvetniks studied by Tambovtseva tended to have views commonly associated with right-wing politics, including antisemitism and homophobia. Vseyasvetnaya Gramota indeed developed a following within the circles of Russian nationalism; Ilya Glazunov (1930–2017), a popular figure among Russian nationalists, was also a supporter of the doctrine, sponsoring many initiatives and congresses of the movement.

Tambovtseva observed that the movement is strongly esoteric, and the adherents tend to represent themselves as involved in a secret and mysterious knowledge. The scholar Kaarina Aitamurto characterised Vseyasvetnaya Gramota as a "high-demand, exclusive religious group" which requires strong commitment from adherents in both theory and practice, thus not enjoying much popularity among younger Rodnovers who are better appealed by more inclusive and less demanding forms of Rodnovery. Many prominent organisations of Rodnovery have also formally rejected Vseyasvetnaya Gramota on doctrinal bases, although Oleg Gusev and Roman Perin, exponents of Peterburgian Vedism, are among those Rodnovers who continued to support the doctrine.

== See also ==
- Rodnovery
  - Bazhovism
  - Peterburgian Vedism
  - Ynglism
- Anthroposophy
- Fourth Way
- Kabbalah
- Russian cosmism
