= Bazhovism =

Slavic neopagan religion

Bazhovism (Russian: Бажовство) is a Rodnover (Slavic Neopagan) movement focused in the Ural region of Russia, founded by Vladimir Viktorovich Sobolev in the early 1990s in Chelyabinsk, and incorporated as the Bazhovite Academy of Esoteric Knowledge of the Urals (Бажовская академия сокровенных знаний Урала). The name of the movement refers to the writer Pavel Bazhov, whose tales are the main holy scriptures of the Bazhovites. Bazhovism is regarded as the major new religious movement of the Ural region, and its theology is centred around the goddess of the Ural Mountains, the Mistress of the Copper Mountain.

The Bazhovites regard Arkaim, not far from Magnitogorsk in the Chelyabinsk Oblast, as the navel of the Earth where there is an exchange of energy with the higher planes of the universe, and the Ural Mountains as the energetic heart of Russia, being the line of juncture between Europe and Asia. Bazhovites are mostly concentrated in Chelyabinsk Oblast, Sverdlovsk Oblast, Tyumen Oblast, Perm Krai and Bashkortostan within Russia, but there is also a community in Kazakhstan.

== Overview ==
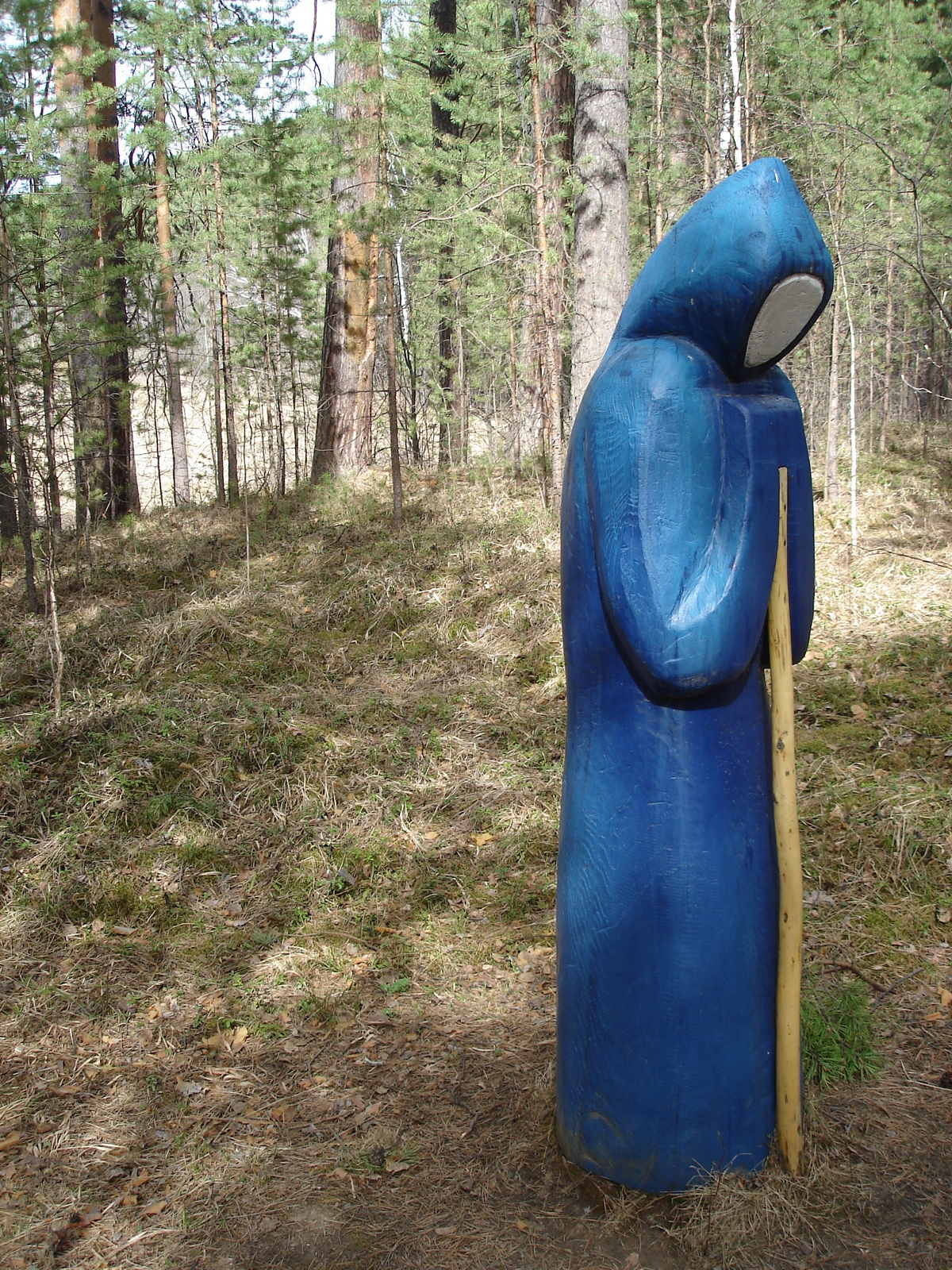
Idol representing a shaman at the Bazhov Park in Sysert, Sverdlovsk Oblast, Russia

Bazhovism was founded in 1993 in Chelyabinsk by Vladimir V. Sobolev, a chemical scientist. It is regarded as the major characteristically Ural new religious movement, along with a branch in Perm Krai, and was briefly persecuted under the governor Pyotr Sumin in Chelyabinsk Oblast. The Bazhovite movement integrates Slavic paganism with Roerichism within the framework of the tales of Pavel Bazhov. Besides Roerichism—from which it has acquired the practice of Agni Yoga, deemed the "Fiery Bible"—the movement also draws elements from Dunovism (the works of Omraam Mikhaël Aïvanhov are authoritative within the movement), Russian Orthodoxy and East Asian religions. The movement is Eurasianist in trying to unify European and Asian identity and in seeing the Ural Mountains as the location of their junction. Notably, the founder Sobolev proclaimed himself a reincarnation of the Chinese philosopher Confucius, and is considered by his followers as a prophet and diviner.

Because of its sacralisation of Bazhov's legacy, Bazhovism has been compared to the other Russian Rodnover movement of Vseyasvetnaya Gramota, which does a similar operation with the legacy of Alexander Pushkin. Similarly to Vseyasvetnaya Gramota, Bazhovism is also a religion with universal aims, as Sobolev wanted to establish a "world Bazhovite religion", and both the movements emphasise the need to recover a sacred knowledge which allows those who master it to interpret reality rightfully. According to Karina Y. Povstyeva, the Russian narrative genre of skaz, that in which Bazhov's tales are formulated, which combines real and unreal elements, lends itself particularly well to esoteric interpretation and doctrinalisation.

The tales of Pavel Bazhov are deemed the "Gospel of the Urals" within the Bazhovite movement, and their characters are held to be personifications of deities and saviours of the Urals. Bazhov presented himself as a reteller of sacred knowledge about the Urals, not as a creator of it, although this claim is not considered reliable within the academic community. In his At the Old Mine (1938), a critical essay about his own work, Bazhov says that he learnt the stories about Ural sacred knowledge from his grandfather V. A. Khmelinin (nicknamed Slyshko) between 1892 and 1895. In the popular science book Ural Hyperborea written by the Russian philosopher V. N. Demin, which contains an interpretation of Bazhov's tales similar to that of the Bazhovites, it is written that Khmelinin in turn learnt the sacred knowledge from other old storytellers, and that such knowledge ultimately arose from the "collective unconscious" of the Ural people. Demin parallelises the concept of "Ural" with that of "Hyperborea", both representing, according to him, the original undivided humanity bearer of an original "single mythology, culture, language and social system". According to Demin, Bazhov's tales present this very idea of "Ural Hyperborea".

== Beliefs ==
=== Theology ===
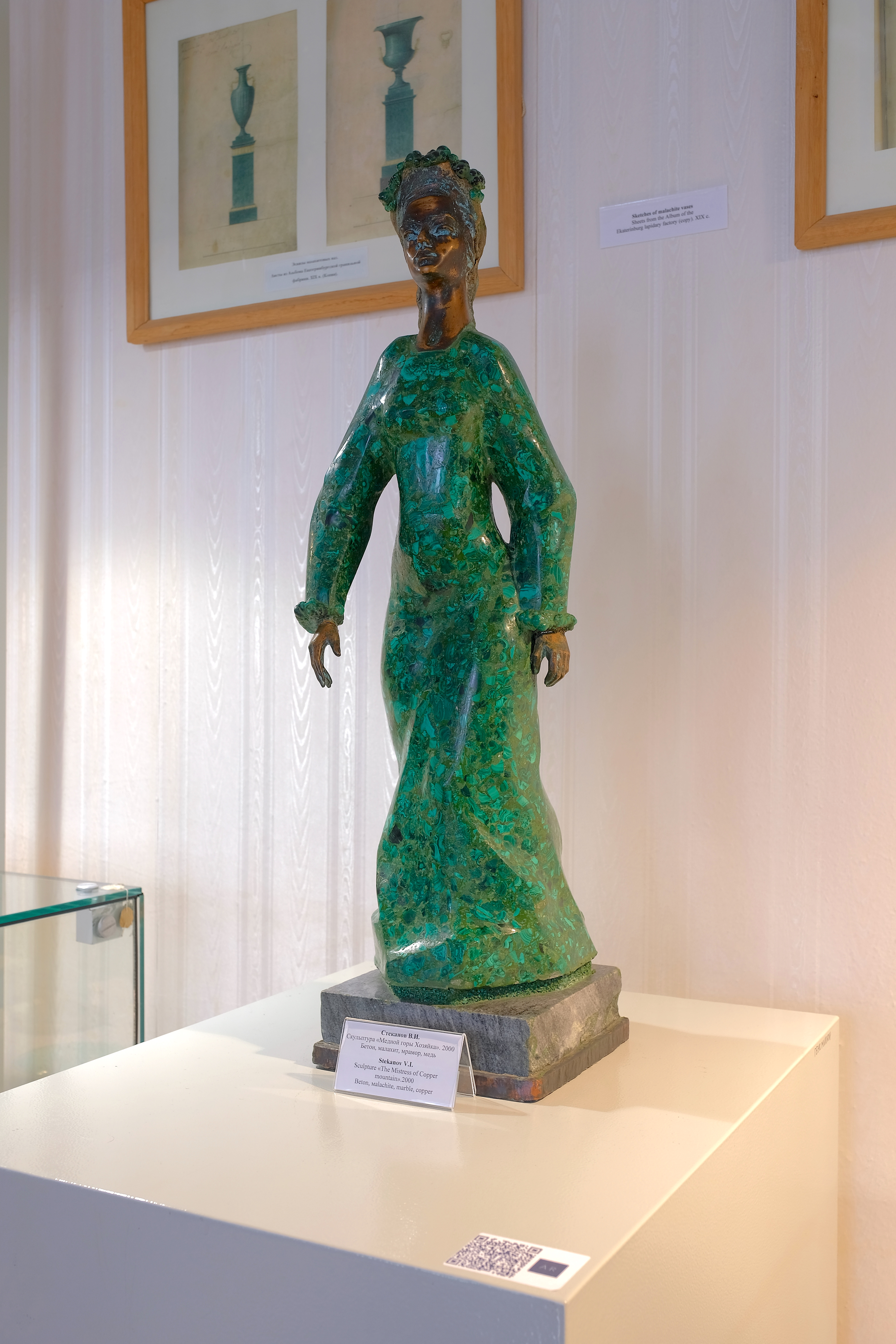
An idol of the Ural goddess

In Bazhovite theology, the supreme God is called the "Father of the Universe" and is equated with the Logos, the supreme "Mind of the Universe"; his opposing power is the Earth, which is also identified with Lucifer, and is the source of all evil forces of disorder. To protect life on the Earth from the power of Lucifer, God created the "Mother of the World", whose assistants are the Mistress of the Copper Mountain (Khozyayka Mednoy Gory), who is the goddess of the Ural Mountains, and the "Great Leader"—identified with various incarnations, namely the Christ, before him Zoroaster in Arkaim, and in the future the Chud of the Urals. Yermak, a Cossack ataman of the 16th century, is deified as another of the "great incarnations" and as the "unifier of Europe and Asia". In a Bazhovite magazine he was described as follows:

Yermak connected Europe and dug the way to the East, from where the light always comes, where the mysterious Belovodye is located, attracting the seekers of God and meaning of life for centuries. Yermak knew about all this.

— Atlantis, 1995, No. 2

The Mistress of the Copper Mountain is the most important deity of Bazhovism, believed to guard the access to the sacred knowledge and to open it only to her elects. The goddess manifests herself through the animal, vegetal and mineral kingdoms, and is considered to protect all the peoples of the Urals through her "fiery" spiritual force. The anthem of the major yearly festival of the Bazhovites recites:

Not in a wonder tale – the Mistress of the Mountain will come in reality, / To the one willing to devote his skill to the people, / As an impulse of beauty out of the strain for work, / With the knowledge of the higher powers, he will be enlightened.

The Mistress of the Copper Mountain is the guardian of the real overworld hidden from ordinary perception, the "Ural Elysium", represented as well as the interior of a mountain full of treasures, accessible only to those whom the goddess allows to enter—unmarried young men who become her lovers. Before being codified into Bazhov's tales, this belief was already present among the mining workers of the Ural Mountains. According to V. N. Demin, the Mistress of the Copper Mountain is an instance of the worldwide cult of the mother goddess. In his essay At the Old Mine, Bazhov described the Ural goddess as follows:

The Mistress of the Mountain became the personification of the power, wealth and beauty of the subsoil, which are fully revealed only to the best representatives of the working people.

Besides the Mistress of the Copper Mountain, the Bazhovites also worship the Great Snake/Colubrid (Veliky Poloz), the Blue Snake/Dragon (Sinyaya Zmey), the Blue Lady (Sinyushka) and the Fire Lady (Ognevushka), among other characters from Bazhov's tales; they are considered to be assistants of the Ural goddess. The Great Snake, also called the Snake/Dragon Man (Chelovek-Zmey), is the "guardian of the Earth"; according to Demin, the snake or dragon is another element of the "archaic worldview of the Hyperborean ancestors", representing the union of the masculine and feminine principles.

=== Eschatology ===
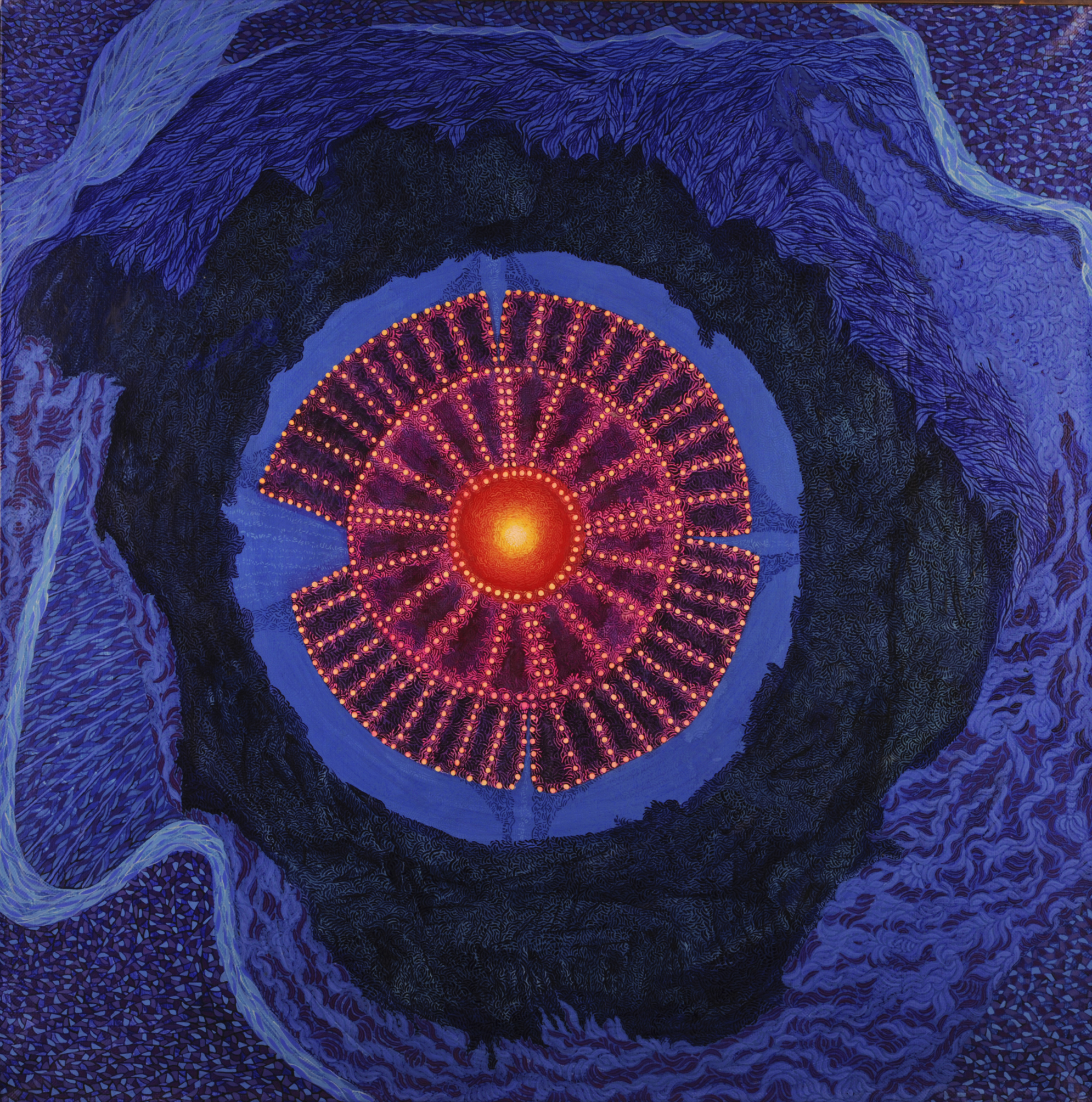
Arkaim Shining—Russian artist Lola V. Lonli, 2013

Bazhovism is a pronouncedly eschatological religion, whose eschatology is apocalyptic in its type. Amongst Bazhov's texts, The Malachite Box is considered to be a historical document, a symbolic representation of the history of Russia. Vladimir Sobolev foretold the end of times to occur in the late 1990s; he foresaw that Siberia would escape the degradation of the world and from the Siberian people would arise the new race of the Age of Aquarius in Belovodye. This would be the Ural "place of serene existence". From Belovodye, located either in the region of the Ural Mountains or, according to other accounts, in that of the Altai Mountains, a universal Slavic empire would arise, led by a new incarnation of the Great Leader, the Ural Chud.

The new race of the Age of Aquarius would be constituted by elements of the Russians governing the heart, of the Tatars governing the will, and of the Jews governing the intelligence. V. N. Demin, in his Ural Hyperborea, also introduced the concept of "spiritual Shambhala", a higher plane of comprehension of sacred knowledge which is revealed only to those who conduct "a righteous life, righteous thoughts, righteous deeds". According to the Bazhovites, Shambhala is the same as Arkaim, the energetic centre of the Earth, its "navel", where the "exchange of energy with the universe takes place", and will be the model for building the new Aquarian civilisation. For this belief, the Bazhovites are sometimes also referred to as the "Bazhov-Arkaimites".

== Practices ==
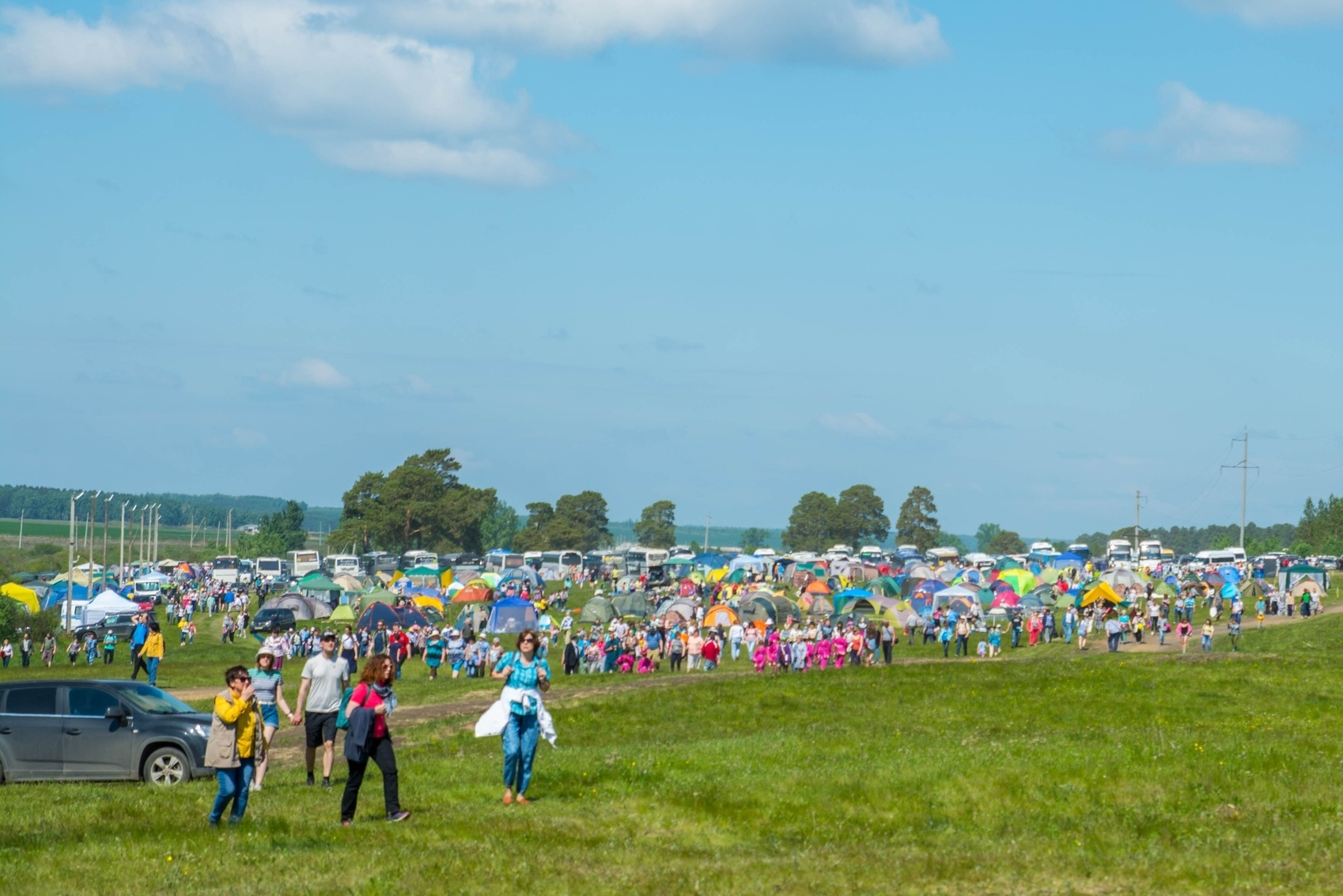
People at the 2018 Bazhov Festival

Since 1993 a yearly "Bazhov Festival" (Bazhovka) is held on the summer solstice, the Kupala Night, originally at the Lake Chebarkul. The festival receives the support of the local administration of Chelyabinsk Oblast, the ministries of culture of Bashkortostan, Kazakhstan and Uzbekistan, local entrepreneurs, and over the years it received appreciation by many public figures, including Nikita Mikhalkov, and was attended amongst others by Lev Anninsky and Altynshash Jaganova. Often, tickets for railway and airplane transport to the festival were provided free of charge, trains of the Moscow–Chelyabinsk route were decorated according to Bazhovite themes, and shields painted with mystical Bazhovite icons were hung throughout the cities. Local troops of the Russian army also took part in the festivity.

The festival is believed to represent a prototype of the "millennial kingdom" of Belovodye. During the festivity, the Bazhovites do characteristic Rodnover practices like jumping over bonfires, burning stuffed animals, and lecturing on Rodnover authors. At the locations where the festivity takes place, the Bazhovites erect idols representing their deities; the idol of the Mistress of the Copper Mountain is preferably made with wax, believed to be the material which better channels the "energy of the spirit" of the goddess. The Bazhovites also implement Agni Yoga, a spiritual practice which originated in the Roerichian movement.

== Demographics ==
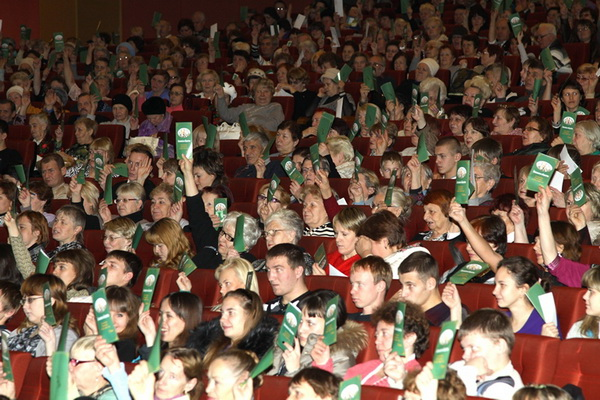
Bazhovite conference in Yekaterinburg in 2011

The Bazhovite Association (Бажовское общество), one of the organisations of the Bazhovite movement other than the Bazhovite Academy of Esoteric Knowledge of the Urals, was founded in 2011 in Sverdlovsk Oblast, with branches in the cities of Pervouralsk, Severouralsk and Krasnoturyinsk, and 35,000 adherents from the same region joined it by the end of that year.

== See also ==
- Slavic Native Faith
  - Vseyasvetnaya Gramota
- Roerichism
- Eastern religions

== Citations ==
=== Sources ===
- Bourdeaux, Michael; Filatov, Sergey, eds. (2006). Современная религиозная жизнь России. Опыт систематического описания [Contemporary religious life of Russia. Systematic description of experiences] (in Russian). Vol. 4. Moscow: Keston Institute; Logos. pp. 11–12, 40–50. ISBN 5987040574.
- Gaidukov, Alexey V. (2000). Идеология и практика славянского неоязычества [Ideology and practice of Slavic Neopaganism] (PDF) (Thesis) (in Russian). Saint Petersburg: Herzen University. Archived from the original (PDF) on 22 October 2021.
- Lunkin, Roman; Filatov, Sergei (2000). "The Rerikh Movement: A Homegrown Russian 'New Religious Movement'" (PDF). Religion, State & Society. 28 (1): 135–48. doi:10.1080/713694743. S2CID 55200851. Archived from the original (PDF) on 5 August 2019.
- Popov, Igor (2016). Справочник всех религиозных течений и объединений в России [The Reference Book on All Religious Branches and Communities in Russia] (in Russian). Archived from the original on 22 March 2020.
- Povstyeva, Karina Yurievna (2020). Esoteric Appropriation of Classical Russian Literary Texts (Thesis) (in Russian). Moscow: Higher School of Economics.
