= Peterburgian Vedism =

Neopaganian movement

Peterburgian Vedic wolf-pronged kolovrat (swastika)

Peterburgian Vedism (Russian: Петербургский Ведизм) or Peterburgian Rodnovery (Петербургское Родноверие), or more broadly Russian Vedism (Русский Ведизм) and Slavic Vedism (Славянский Ведизм), is one of the earliest branches of Rodnovery (Slavic Neopaganism) and one of the most important schools of thought within it, founded by Viktor Nikolayevich Bezverkhy (volkhv Ded Ostromysl; 1930–2000) in Saint Petersburg, Russia, in the 1970s. Early Peterburgian Vedism developed independently from other Rodnover movements in the inland of Russia, due to the distinguished culture of the city of Saint Petersburg itself, and represents one of the most cohesive right-wing nationalist Rodnover movements.

Despite the isolation of the movement in its first stages, early Peterburgian Vedists drew inspiration from Russian-Ukrainian Ivanovism, and established relations with Vseyasvetniks and Ynglists, while the use of the term "Vedism" to refer to Rodnovery goes back to Yury Petrovich Mirolyubov, the writer or discoverer of the Book of Veles. Peterburgian Vedic theology is a pantheism in which all the gods are considered hypostases proceeding from the supreme Yedinobog (Единобог, "One-God"). Communities of Peterburgian Vedism have been founded throughout Russia, in Belarus and in Ukraine.

== Overview ==
=== Definition of "Vedism" ===
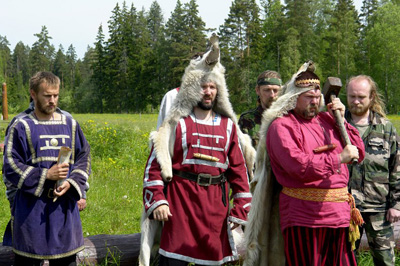
Russian priests of the Skhoron ezh Sloven organisation of Peterburgian Vedism. The founder of the organisation Vladimir Golyakov (1968–2021) is the one holding the hammer.

Viktor Bezverkhy borrowed the term "Vedism"—itself already used in the academia to refer to the historical Vedic religion based on the Indian Vedas—from Yury Mirolyubov and his interpretation of the Book of Veles, aligning with that tradition of thought which identified Slavic religion with ancient Vedic religion, studied linguistic and conceptual Indian-Slavic parallels, and speculated about what the original "Vedic Russian" or "Vedrussian" religion was like. According to the Peterburgian Vedists, the word "Vedism" comes from the verb "to know" (vedat')—a semantic root which Slavic languages share with Indian Sanskrit language —, and it expresses the difference between sight or knowledge of spiritual truth and dogmatic "believing" (verit'), the latter being typical of non-Vedic doctrines. According to one of the leaders of the Peterburgian Vedic movement, Roman Perin, "Rodnovery" defines the practised religion, while "Vedism" defines the philosophy at its core.

In Bezverkhy's thought, "Vedism" defines the worldview of the ancient Aryans, which is based upon empirical observation of the phenomena of the world and is therefore a science, a system of knowledge and common sense not based on a transcendental supernatural revelation, a natural philosophy. To Bezverkhy, science is at the heart of knowledge, in principle "there is nothing incomprehensible" in reality, and "there is nothing in the world except matter moving in space and time and its inherent properties". The spiritual world is thus understood through a pantheistic poeticisation of nature. By "Aryans", "Slavs" and "Wends", Bezverkhy and his followers comprehend "all the peoples of Eurasia engaged in grain growing", thus agriculturalists, ploughers and croppers, later culturally distinguished into modern Slavic, Germanic and Finno-Ugric peoples. Bezverkhy ascribed to his definition of "Aryans" not merely the peoples derived from the Indo-Europeans, but also the Sumerians and peoples who were subject to an "early Indo-European assimilation". Bezverkhy explained the etymology of the term "Aryans" as being related to the verb "to plough" (орать, orat'), and "Wends" as meaning those people who "knitted sheaves" (вено венил, veno venil). According to Bezverkhy, these peoples would possess an innate "creative consciousness" linked to "a natural sense of the highest common justice".

Bezverkhy defined "Vedism" as a dialectical method for the "collection of the most general laws of the self-development of nature", which gives "a holistic system of view on the world, the idea of nature, which a person continuously cognises, and on society as a just structure of relations between individuals in the process of their life"; such resulting outlook was called by Bezverkhy zdravomyslie (здравомыслие), literally mental "sanity" or "sagacity". Vladimir Golyakov, the founder of Skhoron ezh Sloven, one of the largest organisations of Peterburgian Vedism, said that the strength of the Slavic religion is that it may be constructed and reconstructed precisely just by observing the laws of nature itself, without the need of books and myths. According to Alexey Tishchenko, one of the early spokesmen of Bezverkhy in the Union of Wends, the organisation of Peterburgian Vedism that was founded by Bezverkhy himself, supernatural abstraction "arises either in the feverish state of a sick person or in the calculating mind of a cunning man, a deceiver".

"Vedism" therefore is not religion but that sight and knowledge which antecedes religion; according to Bezverkhy, dogmatic religions such as Christianity in Europe and Brahmanism in India, were created by ruling elites in order to control masses of slaves. According to the Peterburgian Vedists, "Vedism" is the fundamental philosophical core common to all Indo-European (Aryan) cultures; Rodnovery is just one of its expressions amongst others, so that, in the Peterburgian Vedic conception, "Vedism" functions as an overarching category encompassing many local religions just like Orthodox Christianity encompasses a number of autocephalous churches.

Outside Peterburgian Vedism, the term "Vedism" is adopted by many other currents and leaders within Rodnovery, since, after the spread of the Book of Veles and Mirolyubov's thought, by the mid-1970s it had become a synonym for the nascent Rodnovery as a whole. For instance, it was popularised by the editor-in-chief of the magazine Russkaya Pravda, Aleksandr M. Aratov, and by the influential Rodnover author Alexander Asov, who used it as a synonym of "Orthodoxy" as belief in Rod (the supreme God), affirming that it is a primordial religious knowledge that later gave rise to various regional traditions, including historical Indian Vedism; Russian Vedism, in Asov's thought, is that which would have transmitted Vedic teachings in the clearest way. Other Rodnovers draw examples directly from modern Hinduism, explaining their borrowings primarily with the fact that in India the Aryan tradition was preserved most fully, as it was not suppressed by the aggressive inroads of Christianity and Islam. Mirolyubov, for his part, espoused the theory of Indigenous Aryanism, according to which the Aryans, or Slavs, originated in northern India and then spread across Eurasia, and the ancient Slavic religion was a coarser version of the religious system codified in the Indian Vedas.

=== Characteristics of the movement ===
Peterburgian Vedism began in relative independence from other Rodnover movements which developed in other parts of Russia. This was due to the distinct culture of the city of Saint Petersburg, which is a Russian culture closer to the culture of Scandinavia than to mainland Russian culture, even in religious terms, with the presence of many groups afferent to Germanic Heathenry. Despite such isolation, early Peterburgian Vedists drew some doctrines from Ivanovism, a movement of natural living and healing founded by the Russian-Ukrainian mystic Porfiry Ivanov. They also cultivated relations with the groups of Vseyasvetnaya Gramota from the beginnings of the movement in the 1970s and throughout the 2010s. Scholars have also reported of an acquaintance in the 1990s of Viktor Bezverkhy with Aleksandr Khinevich and the Ynglists. Khinevich was reportedly granted the title of "honorary Wend" by the Union of Wends. Although there was not a full-fledged cooperation and the Peterburgian Vedists never accepted the Slavo-Aryan Vedas of Ynglism, Khinevich took inspiration from Peterburgian Vedism and reprinted many materials of the Union of Wends. Bezverkhy also possibly had a direct influence on Viktor M. Kandyba, who in the 1980s and 1990s began to popularise his own take on "Russian Vedism", namely Kandybaism.

Bezverkhy was the first to publish the complete Book of Veles in the Soviet Union: in 1989 he managed to contact the heirs of the emigree Boris A. Rehbinder (1909–1987), the author of the essay in French Vie et religion des Slaves selon le Livre de Vles (1980) and to get a copy of the book translated into Russian by Rehbinder himself; Bezverkhy reprinted it and put 300 copies into circulation. Bezverkhy codified his doctrine of Peterburgian Vedism into a series of eleven books, respectively titled Rigveda, History of Religion, History of Philosophy, Philosophy, Physics, Astrology, Anthropology, Sociology, Ethics, Aesthetics and Philosophy of Religion. Vladimir Golyakov, who gave a significant impetus to the movement beside and after Bezverkhy, set out his doctrines in the openly distributed book Solstice (Solnstevorot), but also in other books reserved to priests only, including Trizna, Rodovoy stroy, Shesten, Spolokh, Gromovik, Dozhdevik, Zmeyevik.

The Peterburgian Vedism of Bezverkhy has provided a long-lasting paradigm for politically engaged right-wing and fascist Rodnovers all throughout Russia. Bezverkhy's thought against modern phenomena of the Western world, such as technocracy, feminism and homosexuality, contributed to the bases of the strong anti-Western sentiment which characterises Rodnover political philosophy. This anti-Western sentiment is accompanied by anti-Christian sentiment, as Bezverkhy's though is similar to that of another influential early Rodnover leader, Alexey Dobrovolsky of Kirov, who deemed Christianity a foreign entity forcibly imposed on the Slavic peoples. The Peterburgian Vedists, however, have oftentimes collaborated with nationalist Orthodox Christians, seeing the Russian Orthodox Church as a localised religion which is not in league with transnational Christianity.

== History ==
=== 1970s–1990s: Society of Mages, Union of Wends ===
Viktor Nikolayevich Bezverkhy (1930–2000), a professional soldier, graduated in philosophy at the Kuznetsov Naval Academy of Saint Petersburg (then Leningrad) and later taught at Leningrad State University and at some military academies. He began his activities about Rodnovery under the name of volkhv Ostromysl in the 1970s, and became the most influential Rodnover in Saint Petersburg for a decade and a half, so that he is often said to have been the "grandfather" of Rodnovery in the city. In 1986 he founded a secret organisation, the "Society of Mages" (Общество Волхвов, Obshchestvo Volkhvov), principally initiating his students, which in 1990 was followed by the "Union of Wends" (Союз Венедов, Soyuz Venedov), the earliest public organisation of Peterburgian Vedism. The Union of Wends, for which Bezverkhy acted as the ideologue and leader, was founded by a group of nationalist-patriot youths who had previously taken part in activities of the Pamyat organisation. Bezverkhy's Union of Wends was internally structured into three orders, to which the members adhered according to their interests and background: "White Wends", "Golden Wends" and "Black Wends".

The centrality of nationalism to Bezverkhy's thought led to alliances of the Union of Wends with nationalists from different ideological backgrounds. In 1990 they supported the Russian National Union of Alexander Barkashov, while in 1991 they formed the backbone of the Russian Party. In the mid-1990s Bezverkhy found many like-minded followers among the Orthodox Christians of Saint Petersburg who nurtured anti-ecumenical ultranationalist sentiments supported by the then Metropolitan Ioann Snychev. In the presidential elections of 1996 the Union of Wends supported the candidate of the Communist Party of Russia, Gennady Zyuganov. At that time, discontent for Boris Yeltsin's pro-Western liberal politics turned many right-wing nationalists towards the Communist Party of Russia, which represented the forces of conservatism within society. For the Union of Wends, "communism" was not the same as Marxism–Leninism, and when analysed from the framework of Western political categories the Union of Wends is an unambiguously right-wing movement. Later on, the Union of Wends established cooperation with various far-right forces in western Europe.

In Bezverkhy's ideas, mysticism and politics have to be united, as the role of mysticism is that of enlightening the social structure; he desired to establish a Rodnover military structure to implement and maintain "public order". Bezverkhy was among the first to give the example of a politically active right-wing, fascist Rodnovery, which influenced the attitude of broader Russian society towards the whole movement of Rodnovery, still stereotypically seen as extremely right-wing. His promotion of nationalism and conservatism led Bezverkhy to have troubles with the authorities of the Soviet Union on various occasions. Two years after he had founded the Society of Mages, in 1988, Bezverkhy received an official warning from the KGB about the inadmissibility of the spread of fascism and the organisation of combat groups. In the early 1990s he was prosecuted for having sold copies of Adolf Hitler's Mein Kampf through the publishing house of the Union of Wends, and for having incited hatred towards Jews, but in both cases he was found not guilty.

=== 1990s–2000s ===
==== Fragmentation of the Union of Wends ====
After the death of Bezverkhy in 2000, the early Union of Wends split into various organisations, most of which kept the same name. Among the reasons for the split into different groups was the attitude towards the Ukrainians; one faction regarded them as part of the Russians, while another faction regarded them as an independent nation and as the direct heirs of Kievan Rus'. Another reason was that the original Union of Wends did not provide a precise religious practice, which had become necessary for the growing movement. The splinter organisations generally continue to follow the ritual calendar compiled by Bezverkhy and to recognise him as their spiritual founder. A new homonymous Union of Wends arose from the core of the original organisation led by Viktor Fedosov, and as of 2006 it was headed by Fedosov himself and Alexey Tishchenko. As of 2017 it had branches outside Saint Petersburg in Veliky Novgorod, Pskov, Samara, Tomsk and in Kemerovo Oblast. Other two Peterburgian Vedists, Oleg Gusev and Roman Perin, continued in the footsteps of Bezverkhy publicising their ideas through many books and newspapers, including Za Russkoye Delo and Potayennoye. Another organisation which split out of the Union of Wends in 2000 is "Solstice" (Solnstevorot) led by Artyom Talakin, which originated as the youth branch of the original organisation; it continues in the wake of Bezverkhy and as of 2017 it had a large sanctuary in the Northwestern Federal District and branches in many cities of Russia. Many communities of Peterburgian Vedists, otherwise, joined the Union of Slavic Communities of the Slavic Native Belief of Vadim Kazakov, which was founded in 1997, and other Rodnover organisations. Since 1990 and through the 2000s, the central Union of Wends published the magazines Rodnye Prostory, Volkhv (nine years), Yar' (eighteen issues) and Volkh (two issues).

Outside Saint Petersburg, the original Union of Wends also established a strong presence in Pskov, where the local Vedic community emerged in 1990 under the leadership of Dmitry V. Belyaev, a young contract soldier with a secondary musical education, whom his entourage deemed "the chief volkhv of the north-west". The Pskov Vedists organised the discussion group Patriot (Патриот) which held lectures about Vedism at the local scientific library, to which Bezverkhy himself oftentimes took part. When the original Union of Wends collapsed, the Pskov Vedists reorganised themselves as the Union of Wends of Pskov Oblast headed by Georgy Pavlov (1974–), a security guard by profession. In 1998 Pavlov ran for the duma of Pskov, and among the goals of his political program he put forward the deportation of people of non-Russian ethnicity (Jews, Gypsies, Blacks, Vietnamese, Caucasians) outside of the region. The Union of Wends of Pskov Oblast was described as even more pronouncedly nationalist and fascist than the original Union of Wends of Bezverkhy. The organisation was formally dissolved in the 2000s after Pavlov and some other members were sentenced to prison for various violent attacks on Christians, while Dmitry Belyaev disappeared. The Pskov Vedists further reorganised themselves: the most radical wing joined the Freedom Party of Yury Belyaev, while a more moderate wing led by V. E. Baranov founded the group Slavyansky (Славянский) with the aim of developing a religious organisation with less political overtones.

==== Skhoron ezh Sloven ====
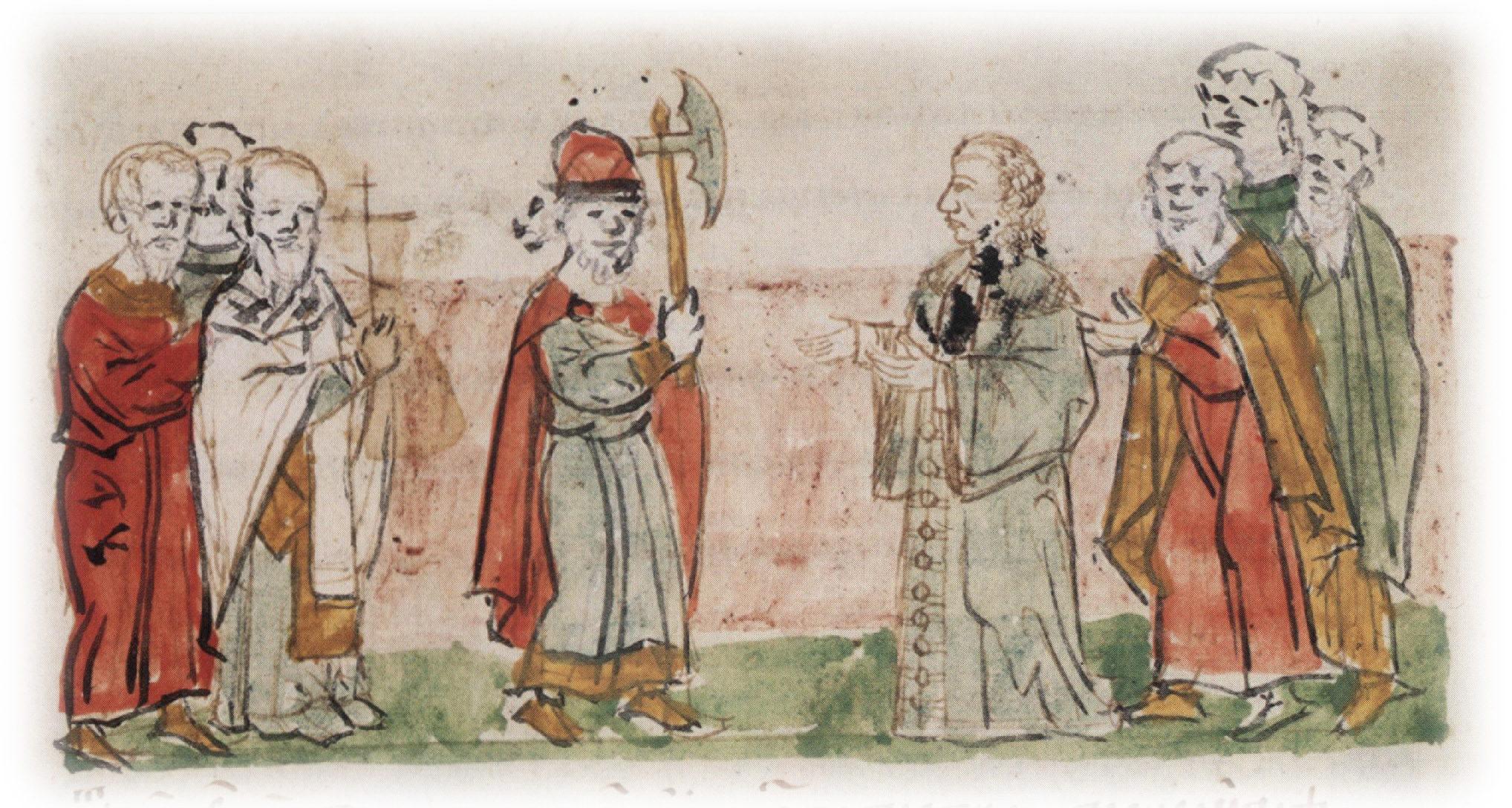
Prince Gleb of Novgorod killing the volkhv (priest) in 1071, as illustrated in the Radziwiłł Chronicle. The Peterburgian Vedic organisation Skhoron ezh Sloven traces its origins to this historical event.

The healer Vladimir Yuryevich Golyakov (volkhv Bogumil II; 1968–2021), who was close to the Union of Wends, began to elaborate Bezverkhy's theology into a corresponding religious practice, comprising magic rituals and folk rituals. Golyakov traced his family lineage to the kin of healers named Bayan-Golyak or Golyakov-Glukhov, who had allegedly transmitted knowledge about the ancient Slavic religion through the generations; he was the leader of the Vedic community Rodobozhie, worked as an obstetrician and practised paid healing at home. Though he actively collaborated to the development of the Union of Wends, Glyakov maintained a certain independence from the very beginning. In 1991 he founded Skhoron ezh Sloven (Схорон еж Словен; an Old Slavonic locution meaning "Preserved be the Slavs"), which in 1997 became completely independent from the Union of Wends and gathered many of the latter's young adepts. The decision to establish the organisation was taken by the "Great Circle" (Великий Круг, Veliky Krug) of the representatives of nine kins of Pomeranian Russian (Pomor, or "Black Russian") healers—of whom Golyakov himself was one—in order to restore "godhood" (богодержавие, bogoderzhavie), that is to say a religious and legal system to reunite the people with God.

According to the scholar Kaarina Aitamurto, even though Skhoron ezh Sloven is not a direct offshoot of the Union of Wends and much of its doctrines and practices are based on Golyakov's family tradition, Golyakov may be regarded as a legitimate heir of the role of Bezverkhy for having initiated much of the new generations of Peterburgian Vedists. After Bezverkhy's death in 2000, his ashes became a matter of controversy between the various groups of his followers and it is not certain where they were buried; the prevailing opinion is that the urn with his ashes was appropriated by Golyakov, who claimed to have buried it under the Temple of Perun of Skhoron ezh Sloven on Zagreb Boulevard in Kupchino, Frunzensky District, Saint Petersburg.

According to Golyakov, the tradition of Skhoron ezh Sloven is centuries old, as it would have been founded in 1074 in Severodvinsk, then a pyatina of Novgorod, by his ancestor Miloslav Bogomil, known as Solovey Bogomil, the high priest of Triglav. Bogomil and fellow priests would have created the secret tradition of the "Wolf Step" (Шаг Волка, Shag Volka) or "Wolf Move" (Ход Волка, Khod Volka) for the direct transmission generation by generation of their runic texts, after an unsuccessful uprising in 1034 led by the priests against the introduction of Christianity and feudalism brought to a persecution of the old religion and the execution of priests by the prince Gleb Svyatoslavich in 1071. Golyakov called Saint Petersburg "Nevograd", claiming that it is the most ancient city of the Slavs and that its original centre was the Oreshek Fortress.

On 9 May 2000 Golyakov founded the Temple of Perun on Zagreb Boulevard which would have become the central place of worship of Skhoron ezh Sloven. Throughout the 2000s Golyakov participated in nationalist marches, attacked Mormons and Jehovah's Witnesses as foreign religions, and led an assault on a human rights organisation. He died from an illness on 5 April 2021; funerary blessings had been made by the fellow priest Svyatoslav Nevo in March. On 13 April, Pavel Galaktionov, chairman of the Saratov branch of the Russian National Unity party, asked the governor of Saint Petersburg Alexander Beglov to formally establish a park with a Slavic temple named in honour of Golyakov. Skhoron ezh Sloven has communities in Saint Petersburg, Moscow, Yekaterinburg, Tyumen, Vladivostok, but also in Belarus and Ukraine. The organisation has a school named "Wolf Step" for the training of young priests.

== Beliefs ==
=== Theology and cosmology ===
==== Yedinobog and the gods ====
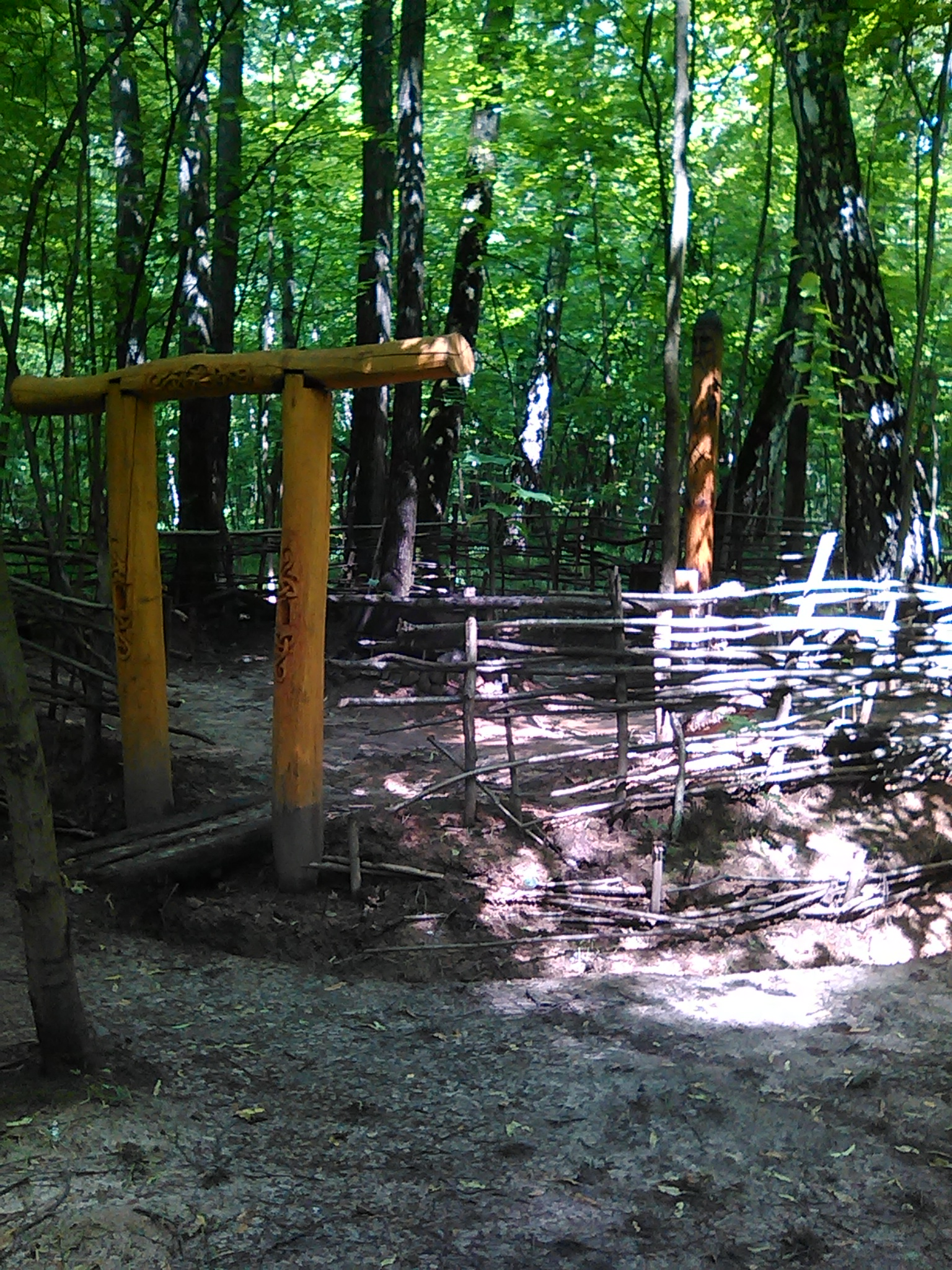
Shrine of Svarog, the supreme God in its visible form, in Bitsa Park, Moscow

Peterburgian Vedic theology is pantheistic: all the gods are considered hypostases of a supreme God, the Yedinobog (Единобог, "One-God"; also Единый Бог, Yediny Bog, "One God"), also called Vsebog (Всебог, "All-God") or Yedinogo Sushchestvo (Единого Существо, "One Being"). Its first manifestation is a duality, Belobog (Белобог, "White-God") and Chernobog (Чернобог, "Black-God"), lightness and darkness, and all the gods may pertain to one or the other side, be them masculine energies of spirit—Vsebog itself—or feminine elementals of matter—Nature; Природа, Priroda. The universal God, which continuously self-reproduces in matter, is called Rod (Род, "Generator") when referring to the power of reproduction itself—the tree of genealogy where it manifests itself as the single ancestors of genealogical lineages —, or Svarog (Сварог, "Heaven") when referring to the entire visible cosmos. It is not an anthropomorphic transcendent creator, as it always exists within material Nature. Yedinobog is considered to be the same as the Odin of Germanic Heathenry; the name "Odin" is held to be a derivation of Yedinobog (the noun один, odin, or the adjective един, yedin, mean "one", "single", and "unitary" in Russian). Like the ancient religion of the Germanic peoples, also those of the Finno-Ugric peoples are considered by Peterburgian Vedists to have derived from the original Slavic wisdom.

In the doctrine of Vladimir Golyakov, the three fundamental tenets of the theology are represented by three fundamental runes, and they are, as explained in the book Trizna:

1. "God is everything" (Old Slavonic: Бо еж се, Bo ezh se; Russian: Бог есть всё, Bog est' vse) – as everything is capable of generating God.
2. "Everything is God" (се еж Бо, se ezh Bo; всё есть Бог, vse est' Bog) – as everything is ready to fertilise everything.
3. "What is law is evident" (то закон, что явно, to zakon, chto yavno; что есть, то есть, chto est', to est'). The third rune is pivotal for the theology, as it means that it is futile for humans to try to explain what they are in principle unable to understand.

While God is one (odin) and unitary (yedin), it manifests itself as the multiplicity of deities which are its various "names" or "attributes". In Viktor Bezverkhy's teachings they are also defined as the "artistic expressions" of the supreme God, and likened to the various roles which a person may take during his life. They exist as personal beings within Nature. God's first dyadic hypostasis, Belobog and Chernobog, continuously switches on all levels of reality, and with them all their further hypostases, Perun (Перун, "Thunderer") and Veles (Велес, "Coverer") and all the other gods, are God itself which constantly changes its name, its face, its personality. The eternity of God is this continuous change, which, below the dyadic hypostasis, manifests itself in Nature as the cycle of the four seasons. The gods are considered to be at the same time personifications of natural forces and deifications of historical ancestors of mankind; in a conjuncture of the two processes, when an ancestral hero accomplished a successful deed, certain natural forces were considered to have concurred to his success, so that, for example, the "prince Dazhd" was united with the god of rain in the divine person of Dazhdbog (Даждбог, "Giving-God") after rain helped Dazhd's heroic deed, while the "prince Strig" was united with the god of wind in the divine person of Stribog (Стрибог, "Wind-God") after wind helped Strig's heroic deed.

The book Solstice of Skhoron ezh Sloven introduces a particular aspect of God, Volk Semarglovich (Волк Семаргловичь). He is the "wolf" (волк, volk) or "dog" (пес, pes) of God, responsible for maintaining the balance between all the sides, all the names, of God, not allowing anyone of them to win to the end or die to the end, keeping the balance between the ever-changing positive and negative sides of God's universal manifestation. The volkhvs (a word itself related to the Slavic term for "wolf") incarnate this power, promoting the cult of one or the other deity at the appropriate time: for example promoting the cult of Ditsnop (Дитсноп) in times of harvest, the cult of Pokhotich (Похотич) in times of reproduction and multiplication, the cult of Zdravich (Здравич) in times of ailment.

==== Rodology and the Congenial Egg ====
Cosmology of Peterburgian Vedism.

The universe generated by the supreme God, and effectively corresponding to it, is eternal and infinite; it has neither beginning nor end in both time and space. The representation of Vsebog as the genealogical tree of all entities and of all humanity, Rod, is particularly important for Peterburgian Vedists as it expresses the very essence of Rodnovery, the idea that divinity is within everything as the principle which vitalises matter, which dies without the active participation of the believer in the life cycle—rodobozhie (родобожие), "divine kinship" and "ancestral godliness", also rendered as "rodology". Therefore, God is within the human being itself, and especially within the blood; the soul, that is to say the ancestral spirits, are believed to live in the blood of their descendants, flowing through the tree of the venous system. A true Slav is held to be one who "glorifies his blood", "glorifies his veins". Devotion to this idea is expressed at the level of each kin through the deification of forefathers in the male lineage as "god of the kin" (родной бог, rodnoy bog), and of foremothers in the female lineage as "goddess of the homeland" (богиня родины, boginya rodiny; рожаница, rozhanitsa; берегиния, bereginya). The way of return to and communication with the Yedinobog, the supreme God of the universe, is the deification of the ancestors.

Peterburgian Vedists believe that every nation is generated by a god, and the people belonging to every nation are given the understanding of the supreme God rightly through their own image of it. A nation, a folk, is regarded by Peterburgian Vedists as a unitary organic entity; all its constituent persons are fragments of a same divine progenitor. Besides, each nation creates its own hierarchy of hypostases, that is to say a pantheon proceeding from the supreme God, according to the nation's own needs. Foreign people may reside within a nation as guests but not masters; they may confess God through their own image of it, but they have no right to change the nation's own way to God. As every folk and its constituent person derives from God, in Peterburgian Vedism there is no space for a belief that some races are "chosen by God", since the supreme God does not give preference to anyone.

In the rodological view, everything is one in the almighty supreme God as a complex unity of all parts, a "Congenial Egg" (Подобный Завяз, Podobny Zavyaz); this cosmic egg is the arborescent system of congenial relationships between all the hypostases of Vsebog. The cosmic egg may not exist without balance, which is maintained by God itself manifesting as a trinity, Triglav ("Three-Headed"); according to the theology of Golyakov, the triadic structure consists of Nature (Priroda) – the matter goddess, Heaven (Svarog) – the body of God, and Time (Время, Vremya) – the condition of all things and the force which effectively unifies the Triglav as the Congenial Egg. Golyakov asserted that only the Slavs preserved the concept of God as Time, while it was lost among other peoples; time is that force which accompanies a person from birth to death and gives them the opportunity to be born again. In the Peterburgian Vedic cosmology of God as Time which vitalises matter and manifests itself as the arborescent blood system in humans, the scholar Vladimir Povarov saw affinities with similar conceptions in other religions, namely Chronos in Hellenism and Zurvan in Zoroastrianism.

=== Psychology and soteriology ===
According to the doctrine of Vladimir Golyakov, good and evil are determined in mankind by a balance between spiritual principles of consciousness and animal principles of the subconscious, blissfulness and anger, victory and defeat, represented respectively by Belobog and Chernobog on a cosmic level. A person may not decide whether he is more on one side or on the other, though he always knows who he is. If a person does not know who he is, a spiritual breakdown occurs within him, and a volkhv may intervene to re-establish the true place of such person in the world. If a person is "a bastard" he should be as impure as Chernobog himself, while if a person is "a hero" he should be as pure as Belobog himself, accepting the role of each other in the cosmos without pretending to be the opposite. In Golyakov's own words:

If you make black, do not call it white; if you make white, do not blacken it; do not sit on two benches, since one bench is for Chernobog, and the other is for Belobog.

Peterburgian Vedists believe in reincarnation; everything is born to die and to be born again, and death is not a definitive cessation of life. In the rodological view of the cosmos, nothing arises from nothing; the God of Peterburgian Vedism does not create reality but generates it in material Nature, which is itself part of God as its female aspect. They believe that the human soul is a combination of informational experience and energetic fields. Masculine spiritual energies and feminine material elements are distributed very rigidly by God, according to their own internal laws. A son will be always born from his father and his mother, and a man is eternalised in the continuing lineage of ancestors and descendants. Based on this view, Peterburgian Vedists believe that the doctrine of reincarnation in other species of beings is erroneous, as reincarnation may only occur in the genetic lineage—in order to be born as a mouse, one must be a mouse; men only reincarnate in mankind.

From the figurative representation of God as Svarog, Peterburgian Vedists draw a conception of paradise (рай, ray) and hell (ад, ad) as two states in the present world: God is the blacksmith who hits the anvil with his hammer; the anvil is Nature wherein persons are born; a single person is the blade which is hammered by God, that is to say tested by the trials of life. If the blade hardens under the blows of the hammer of trials, the person is in a state of "paradise"; if the blade breaks under the blows of the hammer, God throws it into the furnace as it proves itself useless for the economy of the cosmos, and the person is in a state of "hell".

People have to fight for existence, but such fight is not one for acquiring goods which cannot give vitality, but is a fight for God as Time which binds the world together; by struggling with the surrounding nature, and through their own death, people give their descendants the opportunity to grow within time. Such fight is the persistence through paradises and hells, victories and defeats, births and deaths, and such persistence is the constantly alternating dyadic manifestation of God itself as Belobog and Chernobog in the life of single persons and entire nations. Death is a prerequisite for one's rebirth as his offspring. If a person is inactive, if he does not fight, he perishes. The meaning of the struggle is to extend the time allotted to oneself in order to complete one's own work and fulfill one's own destiny.

=== Morality and ethics ===
==== Natural law and the Eleven Tenets ====
In general, Peterburgian Vedic ethics teach "family values, love for the fatherland and the folk, and strife to objectively cognise reality". Peterburgian Vedists of Skhoron ezh Sloven found their ethics on the third rune of the Trizna, "what is law is evident": they interpret holiness not as a state of sinlessness by adherence to a set of abstract norms, but as an affirmation of the natural truth which is a manifestation of God; hallow is that man who says things how they actually are without adding anything of his own interpretation. So, mankind is holy in truth; for example, if a man says that "the Sun is the heart of the Earth, because without it there would be no life" – he has said a holy truth and thus he is hallowed. On a higher level, there is a logic of knowledge of the operation of God conveyed by the volkhvs and known as povedenie (поведение), correct "behaviour" or "demeanor", which consists in acting correctly in alignment with the order of God; the carriers of such correct way of behaving are able to correctly interpret and define the phenomena of the world. The respect of the natural law of God within the human realm also translates as an environmentalist ethics of "honouring and preserving Nature" in its broadest terms, living "in accordance with its requirements" and learning "the laws of its self-development".

Under the leadership of Viktor Bezverkhy, the Union of Wends elaborated a moral code modelled after that of the Ivanovites, constituted by Eleven Tenets.

1. One should work to feed oneself, one's children and those who may not work—one who does not want to work has no place in human society.
2. One should choose a job according to their own inclinations and abilities, taking into account the interests of society and, if possible, continuing family traditions.
3. One should observe labour discipline.
4. One should not smoke and not drink alcoholic beverages as long as they are going to have children.
5. When one reaches wedding age, they should see in the representative of the opposite sex firstly the mother (or father) of their future children, secondly their future faithful wife (or husband), and thirdly the mistress (or master) of their house.
6. One should not stop caring for their children until they have reached full physical and spiritual maturity.
7. One should respect their mother and father, who gave them life, and should not stop caring for them until the end of their life.
8. One should defend their homeland from enemies, observe military discipline, study military science in order to be a skillful warrior, and sacrifice their blood and life itself if necessary.
9. One should prefer freedom to captivity and slavery.
10. One should be honest, love their community and keep it healthy, should not steal other peoples' property, not marry persons unsuitable for a healthy life, not destroy their or anyone else's family, and should observe the moral code.
11. One should protect the healthy vital activity of all mankind, take care of the life and health of workers, and destroy the enemies of the human race with neither mercy nor regret.

In Bezverkhy's doctrine of Peterburgian Vedism, a great emphasis is put on the importance of a tight and functional family and social structure for the wellbeing of mankind; as Bezverkhy himself wrote:

In the family, the biological relationships are originally combined with the social, the former one being dominated by the latter... The elementary functions of the family are the control of the relationships between the sexes, the production of labour force, the education of children, the economic function of the family, and, as part of that, providing for members of the family.

— Viktor Bezverkhy, Sociology, 1996, 22–3

==== Political philosophy ====
Bezverkhy was one of the first Rodnover ideologists to expressively substantiate the idea of the perniciousness of phenomena of Western modernity such as the technocratic civilisation, feminism, homosexuality, and other phenomena, which has become the shared theme of the anti-Western sentiment within broader Rodnovery. Bezverkhy was in favour of the preservation of distinct races, and at the same time he preached against the domination of some ethnicities over others and against class division and class struggle within the same ethnicity. Bezverkhy's rejection of the theory of the equality of all peoples meant to challenge Christianity, his rejection of the domination of some ethnicities on others meant to challenge supremacist nationalism, and his rejection of class struggle meant to challenge Marxism–Leninism. Despite Bezverkhy published the Mein Kampf in the 1990s, by rejecting the supremacist type of nationalism he and the Union of Wends also formally rejected German-type National Socialism. Peterburgian Vedic political philosophy has been described as a peculiar symbiosis of indigenous Slavic religion, the Russian Idea, primitive Slavic collectivism, patriotism, and localism anchored to the soil, perceived as the only way capable of giving prosperity to a rooted mankind and emerging in formations such as National Bolshevism.

The historical research carried out by Bezverkhy was aimed at reconstructing a "shared spiritual heritage of the white people", namely Vedism, functioning as a "foundation for the creation of new useful ideas and developments". Notwithstanding his rejection of the idea of a domination of some races on others, and as part of his rejection of the idea of equality, he advocated racist ideas and spoke of an "ability of the white people to create higher cultures" which "placed them above the yellow and black peoples", and once wrote that "only the white people are capable of evolution". He lectured extensively against miscegenation for the "preservation of the purity of genes and blood"; according to him, mixed-race offspring, such as Jews and Gypsies whom he considered mulattoes, would be "defective" and "useless", and they would "delay social development and social justice". He also wrote that in order to prevent the degeneration given by miscegenation, the state should strictly control marriage relations. According to the scholar Oleg V. Kutarev, however, these beliefs about racism only constitute a small fraction of Bezverkhy's work.

Despite the radical stance of broader Peterburgian Vedism against technocratic Western society, Vladimir Golyakov endorsed the use of modern technology for the sake of Rodnovery, as he saw technology itself as a manifestation of God; as he said:

All phenomena are different sides of God. Be what they are. This means that mankind itself, as part of the All God, may and must use all the possibilities to satisfy its needs.

As for the rest, Golyakov continued in the tradition of Bezverkhy, so that the organisation Skhoron ezh Sloven is against feminism and women may not participate to its ceremonies, but only assist from a distance. Golyakov formulated his attitude towards women as follows:

The woman does not need to know about this [the essence of religion]. She has her own business. She is weaker, which means that her place is below us. In all senses.

In theological terms, Golyakov defined Nature, the feminine side of God, as belonging "to the kin" like the "homeland". According to Golyakov, a woman gives birth to the man for whom she bore her child, and it is in her power to give the right or wrong upbringing to the child. Wrong upbringing from women, according to Golyakov, is the root of all the vices of modern society—female emancipation, homosexuality, effeminate men who are completely ignorant about how to be representatives of the family.

=== Eschatology ===
The rodological view of reality is associated with the idea of a "Golden Age" (Золотой Век, Zolotoy Vek) of mankind which the Vedists aim at reviving. Such Golden Age is associated to the image of a pre-Christian Russia where the cult of the ancestors of the kin relinked each person to the peoples they belonged to as great families, relinked peoples to their gods, to the environment, and to the supreme God as a universal family, without foreign forces spoiling such harmony through international ideologies.

Peterburgian Vedists regard the current world and Russia itself as being in a state of decay in environmental, demographic and moral terms, but they think that things are about to change, and rodology and their political ideas will be fully realised. According to their astrology, the Vedists believe that in 2003 the vernal equinox marked the shift from the era of the constellation of Pisces to the era of the constellation of Aquarius—the Age of Aquarius. According to their geomancy, the sign of Aquarius corresponds to Russia, to which all mankind will connect with the hope of realising a happy future.

The symbol of Aquarius (♒︎), two parallel wavy lines signifying flowing water, is part of the official emblem of the Union of Wends. It is regarded by Peterburgian Vedists as the symbol for the struggle and victory of Vedism itself, the right worldview. As expressed in a watchword of the early Union of Wends from the official magazine of the organisation, Rodnye Prostory:

We will triumph under the sign of Aquarius, we do not need Marxism and Leninism, and we will throw away from our path, without regret, Catholicism, Protestantism and ecumenism.

— Rodnye Prostory, 1994, No. 1

== Practices ==
=== Priesthood ===
Peterburgian Vedic civil rite with an offering of bread performed by priests of Skhoron ezh Sloven at the eternal flame of Tyumen on 9 May 2021

According to Vladimir Golyakov, the priesthood should be constituted by three orders, as it was in ancient times: volkhvs (волхв, "mages", "wisemen" or "priests") – responsible for maintaining the balance between spiritual and animal principles in humanity; rodars (родар) – responsible for the cult of Rod (God as the fabric of interrelations between all entities); and rozhens (рожен) – responsible for the cult of the goddesses and for the care of women in labour. Volkhvs may be either rodars or rozhens, and rodars should be of higher rank than rozhens, since Rod is the masculine principle which impregnates the material goddesses, and the masculine principle always dominates the feminine principle.

The volkhvs—whose title is related to the same Slavic term for "wolf", volk (волк)—are functionaries of Volk Semarglovich, the manifestation of Vsebog responsible for maintaining the balance between the powers of all the ever-switching facets of Vsebog itself, between the positive and negative aspects of divinity. Their task is to show humanity the path of evolution "from beast to civilised men", represented by a ritual invented by Golyakov in which the priest impersonates a wolf which turns into a person. The priests should be impassive like God as Time, which has no emotions and is the impassive ruler of destinies; they should not care about human passions, but just learn the essences of things and open them to people. The rodars have the right to name things and phenomena, matching linguistic roots with the tradition of the homeland; for instance, the cycle of the Sun is called "solstice"—solnstevorot—and it is represented by the well known symbol of the swastika, but both the cycle and the symbol should be named with the native Slavic word, not with the Sanskrit word swastika, since the Slavs are not Indians.

Keeping themselves impassive like the supreme God, the priests should be selfless in their role, so that they should not earn any material benefit from it, and it should not be based on contract (in such case, an agreement with God would be invalid, since God is completely impassible). According to Peterburgian Vedists, the priests do not even have to engage in proselytism, since Rodnovery and rodology is so clear and logical to the Slavs that they turn to it without the need of efforts of persuasion.

=== Myths, rites and temples ===
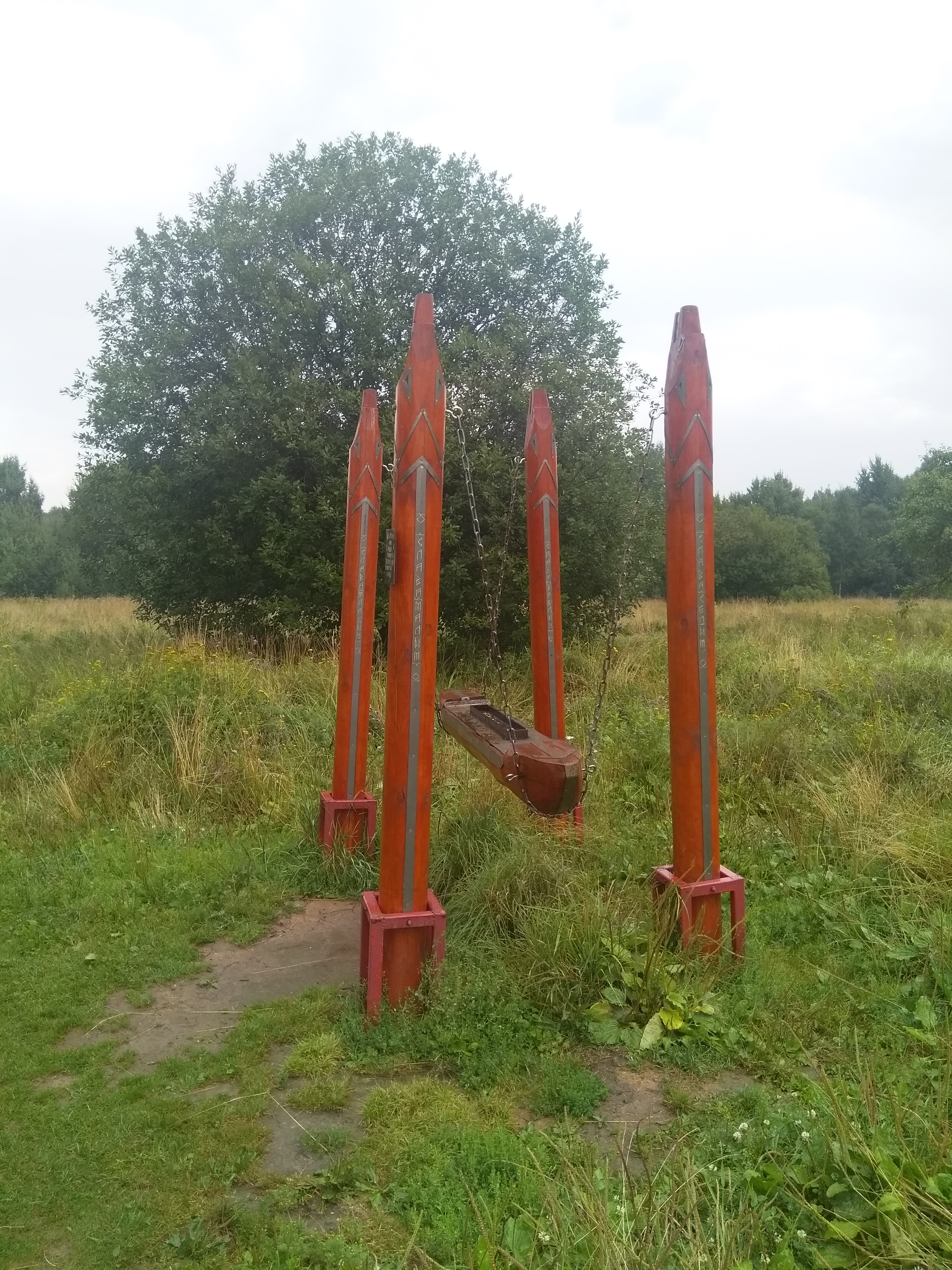
Ritual element at a Rodnover temple located in the area of Lysaya Gora in the Bitsa Park, Moscow. The four wolf-headed totems identify the temple as belonging to the Peterburgian Vedic tradition.

Myth is understood by Peterburgian Vedists as an allegorical description of natural reality in its changes, which provide the foundations for ethical norms to be followed and which are consolidated in art and rite. Historical cultural tradition warrants the continuity of the "connection of times" which strengthens a folk in the present modern time. The early Union of Wends gave to its constituent communities complete freedom for ritual creativity, provided that they were based on the sane view of the world fundamental to the movement. Bezverkhy, however, established a common calendar to ensure that all the communities celebrated rituals at the same times, that is to say on the traditional Slavic holidays of the solstices and the equinoxes. The main holiday is Maslenitsa (Shrovetide), tied to the vernal equinox and marking the passage from the old cycle to the new cycle of the life of the year.

The Union of Wends gives more importance to natural holy places than to purpose-built temples, and focuses on organising cultural and educational events for its communities, being the most "esoteric"—in the sense of closed to the outside world—among the organisations of Peterburgian Vedism (as of 2017 they still eschew the use of the Internet). On holidays, they organise trips to holy stones and kurgan burials such as the Noise Hill in Novgorod Oblast. They base their rituals on folkloric practices and on the ethnographic studies of Boris Rybakov, as it is typical in broader Rodnovery. They make and then burn straw puppets, praise the gods, drink mead, dance in circle (хоровод, khorovod), practise the ritual of "storming the ice fortress", and banquet with pancakes. The rituals also involve the impersonator of a bear, dressed in a stylised skin.

On the other hand, as of 1999 there were in total nine standard temples of Skhoron ezh Sloven in Saint Petersburg and its environs. Each temple is administered by several volkhvs and ten to thirty disciples (волчат, volchat, literally "wolf cubs") who closely collaborate with the priests. The theological principles of the Trizna are written on the inside of wolf hides used as part of the priests' sacramental vestments. Divine services of Skhoron ezh Sloven are held three times a week at the temples by the priests, and three times a day at home by each family of Vedists. For example, in the case of the Temple of Perun on Zagreb Boulevard in Kupchino, Frunzensky District of Saint Petersburg, founded by Golyakov in 2000 for Skhoron ezh Sloven, the land occupied by the temple is divided into twelve sections, each with a sanctuary for Golyakov's twelve fellow priests and their collaborators, and rituals are performed each week on Monday, Wednesday and Saturday. On holidays, the idols of the temples are decorated with special adornments and special rituals are performed, involving sacrifices, kindling of the holy fire, and ritual fights—hand-to-hand or with swords. Peterburgian Vedists of Skhoron ezh Sloven do not practise the sacrifice of animals, but offer honey, bread, eggs and kvass to the deities.

== Relationship with other religions ==
Peterburgian Vedism is, in general, strongly against Christianity, and as such it has been compared to the thought of Alexey Dobrovolsky, an influential Rodnover leader from Kirov, who considered Christianity an alien Jewish ideology imposed with force onto the Slavs. Viktor Bezverkhy deemed Christianity a "foolishness" (чужеверие, chuzheverie) imposed by force, a dogmatic construction formulated by ruling elites with the aim of enslaving masses of people. All forms of Christianity are considered by Peterburgian Vedists as destructive sects; however, sometimes they have collaborated with nationalist sectors of the Russian Orthodox Church, seen as a localised church not involved in the machinations of international Christianity. In particular, some groups such as the Karlovites and the Catacombists, and in general all those Russian Orthodox groups which oppose mainstream society and the centralised church, as well as "folk Orthodoxy", are regarded by the Vedists as "socially akin". Peterburgian Vedists are also at odds with Judaism and Islam, criticising the former for having produced Christianity and for teaching that the Jews are the "chosen people" of God, as well as with Krishnaism. According to Bezverkhy all these religions would be, like Christianity and also Marxism–Leninism, ideological inventions of the defective hybrids produced by interracial mixing.

In the mid-1990s the Union of Wends of Bezverkhy collaborated with nationalist Orthodox Christians of Saint Petersburg who were led by the then Metropolitan Ioann Snychev; Bezverkhy and Snychev were the two leading figures of nationalism in the city in those years. The Union of Wends of Pskov Oblast led by Georgy Pavlov carried out several attacks on Christianity and foreigners in Pskov. In 1998 they broke into a service of the Emmanuel Protestant Church, on 3 February and 16 March 2000 they held pickets and threw cans of red paint at the consulate of Latvia, and then on 5 April 2000 they threw stones at the building of the Church of Evangelical Christians–Baptists located on the territory of the former Latvian Lutheran cemetery and also attacked the Pskov Free University. The walls of the church and of the university were painted with black and green spots, and with the inscriptions wishing "death" to "sectarians", "Jews" and "Schlossberg"—Lev Schlossberg, head of the local Yabloko party and among the founders of the Pskov Free University. The attacks were held on 5 April to coincide with the anniversary of the victory of Alexander Nevsky over the crusaders at Lake Peipus and according to Pavlov some militants of the National Bolshevik Party of Eduard Limonov were involved in the event. On 31 May of the same year, a dozen of members of the Pskov Wends covered with red bandages threw stones at another premise of the Emmanuel Protestant Church. Pavlov and those among his followers who took part in the attacks were brought to trial; Pavlov was sentenced with five years of imprisonment, while the others received less heavy sentences. However, a new trial was initiated in defense of Pavlov and his followers on behalf of the citizens of Pskov, some of whom made an appeal "against anti-Russian fascism and sectarian heresy".

Vladimir Golyakov of Skhoron ezh Sloven denounced all the forms of Christianity with the exception of the Russian Orthodox Church as "filthy sectarians"; the Russian Orthodox Church was spared in Golyakov's discourse because it is a "localised" religion, but respect is given only to those priests of the Orthodox Church who "belong to the Slavic race". Even some other forms of Rodnovery and modern Paganism were deemed by Golyakov to be "new inventions of the Jewish Christians". In the early 2000s, the Peterburgian Vedists of Skhoron ezh Sloven together with the Orthodox Christians of the city organised the violent ousting of a Mormon preacher from the secondary schools of Kupchino, and Golyakov was brought to trial for the beating of the missionary. In 2008, Golyakov dispersed a congregation of Jehovah's Witnesses in Ukraine.

While rejecting all the Abrahamisms, Peterburgian Vedists have strong reverence for all "true" cultures, that is to say indigenous religious cultures of the world. The Union of Wends actively cooperated with Vedists in western Europe, in particular German Vedists who published the magazine Thought and Memory and many of whom were members of the party of The Greens.

== See also ==
- Historical Vedic religion
- Slavic Rodnovery
  - Russian Authentism
  - Ivanovism
  - Kandybaism
  - Vseyasvetnaya Gramota
  - Ynglism
- Germanic Heathenry
