= Ivanovism =

Rodnover new religious movement and healing system

Ivanovism (Russian: Ивановство, Ивановизм) is a Rodnover (Slavic Neopagan) new religious movement and healing system in Eastern Europe based on the teachings of the Russian mystic Porfiry Korneyevich Ivanov (1898–1983), who elaborated his doctrines by drawing upon Russian folklore. The movement began to be institutionalized in the 1980s and '90s, and in the same period it had an influence on the other Rodnover movement of Peterburgian Vedism.

Ivanovite theology is a pantheism in which "Nature" (Pri-Roda in Slavic languages) is seen as a personified, universal and almighty force expressing herself primarily as the four elemental gods of Air, Earth, Fire and Water, while Porfiry Ivanov is deified as the Parshek, her messenger and intercessor. In some interpretations of the theology, Nature is the cloth of a more abstract God, and God comes to full consciousness in mankind. Central to the movement's practice are the Detka ("Child") health system based on twelve commandments and the singing of a Hymn to Life which contains a synthesis of the movement's beliefs.

== Overview ==
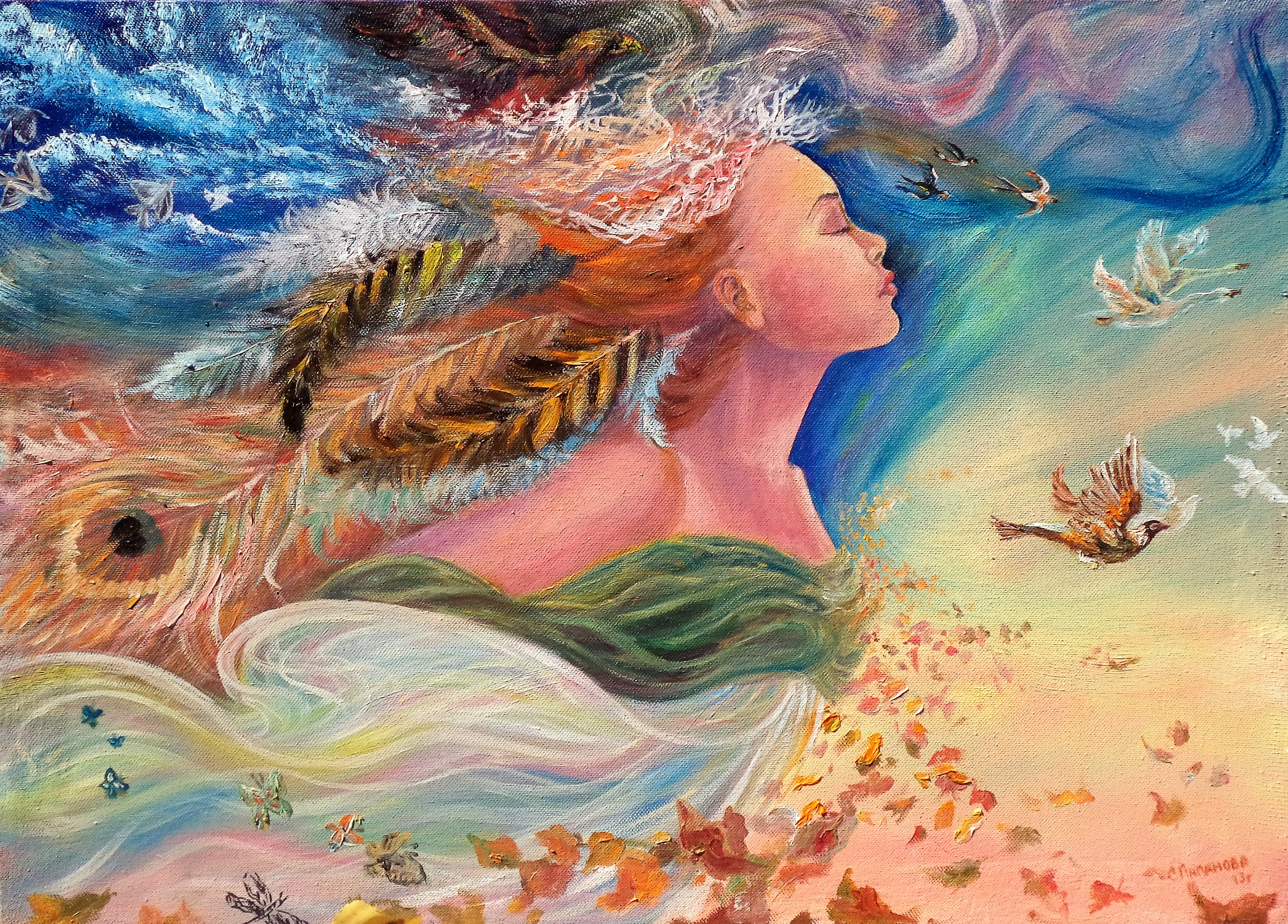
Personified divine "Nature" is the focus of Ivanovite theology. In this picture, personified Nature in a painting by adherents of the other Rodnover movement of the Anastasians.

Scholars of the study of religions have classified Ivanovism variously as a nature religion, a philosophy, and a system of health. The scholar Boris Knorre defined Ivanovism as an autochthonous Slavic new religious movement combining Slavic paganism with some Christian concepts, and a worldview in line with the theories of "energism" and "noospherology". The scholar S. I. Ivanenko ascribed Ivanovism to the "movements of spiritual and physical improvement", while other scholars have emphasised its similarities with Taoism, yogic traditions, and other Eastern religions, while recognising its isolated Russian origins. Some scholars including Alexey V. Gaidukov characterised Ivanovism as a movement of deep ecology, essentially an animism based on the deification of natural elements and on the attribution of healing properties to them, while O. V. Aseyev described it as a system of "health promotion, rituals and healing magic" aimed at "mastering the mystical forces of nature". The scholar Kaarina Aitamurto cited Ivanovism among the movements of Rodnovery (Slavic Neopaganism) built on Russian folklore, noting that it had an influence on the other Rodnover movement of Peterburgian Vedism. The scholar Natalya V. Prokopyuk noted that despite being considerably different from other forms of Rodnovery in its doctrines, Ivanovism shares with other Rodnover movements the idea of a return to the natural world — seen as a source of spiritual strength —, the belief in reincarnation and the idea that by merging with the natural world one may see and steer past and future lives, and the tendency of believers to live in village communities. She also proposed that Ivanovism is ascribable to the broader trend of Russian New Age.

During the history of the movement, because of the shared belief in energetism and noospherology, the Ivanovites got close to the followers of Nikolay Fyodorovich Fyodorov (Fyodorovites) and other Russian cosmists, as well as to the Roerichians. However, the cooperation with these other movements did not last for long because of doctrinal reasons. Conflict with the former arose around the different beliefs concerning the role of mankind within the cosmos and the divinity of Ivanov: while the Ivanovites insisted on complete submission of mankind to the natural forces, the Fyodorovites argued, contrariwise, that the human mind has to tame and harness the natural forces; moreover, the Fyodorovites declared themselves Orthodox Christians and refused Ivanov's divinity. The cooperation with the Roerichians, which had begun at the beginning of the perestroika on projects concerning ecology and pacifism, similarly came to an end as the Ivanovites recognised that the Roerichian doctrine might not integrate Ivanov's divinity and therefore they rejected Agni Yoga — the main Roerichian practice — as "not from God".

According to Knorre, Ivanovism is divided into two levels: the first is the inner circle of initiates, the directive core of the movement, who believe that Ivanov is a deity, practise the most esoteric methods taught by him and maintain a "mystical" connection with him after his death; the second is the outer circle of uninitiates, who only practise the health techniques preached by Ivanov and generally do not share the belief that he is a deity, although among them there may be single adherents who hold this belief. The Russian Orthodox Church expressed strong criticism towards the Ivanovites; the Orthodox Christian theologian and activist Alexander Dvorkin criticised Ivanovism for spreading "dense paganism" and "primitive shamanism", and deemed Porfiry Ivanov a "psychopath".

== History ==
=== Early 20th century ===
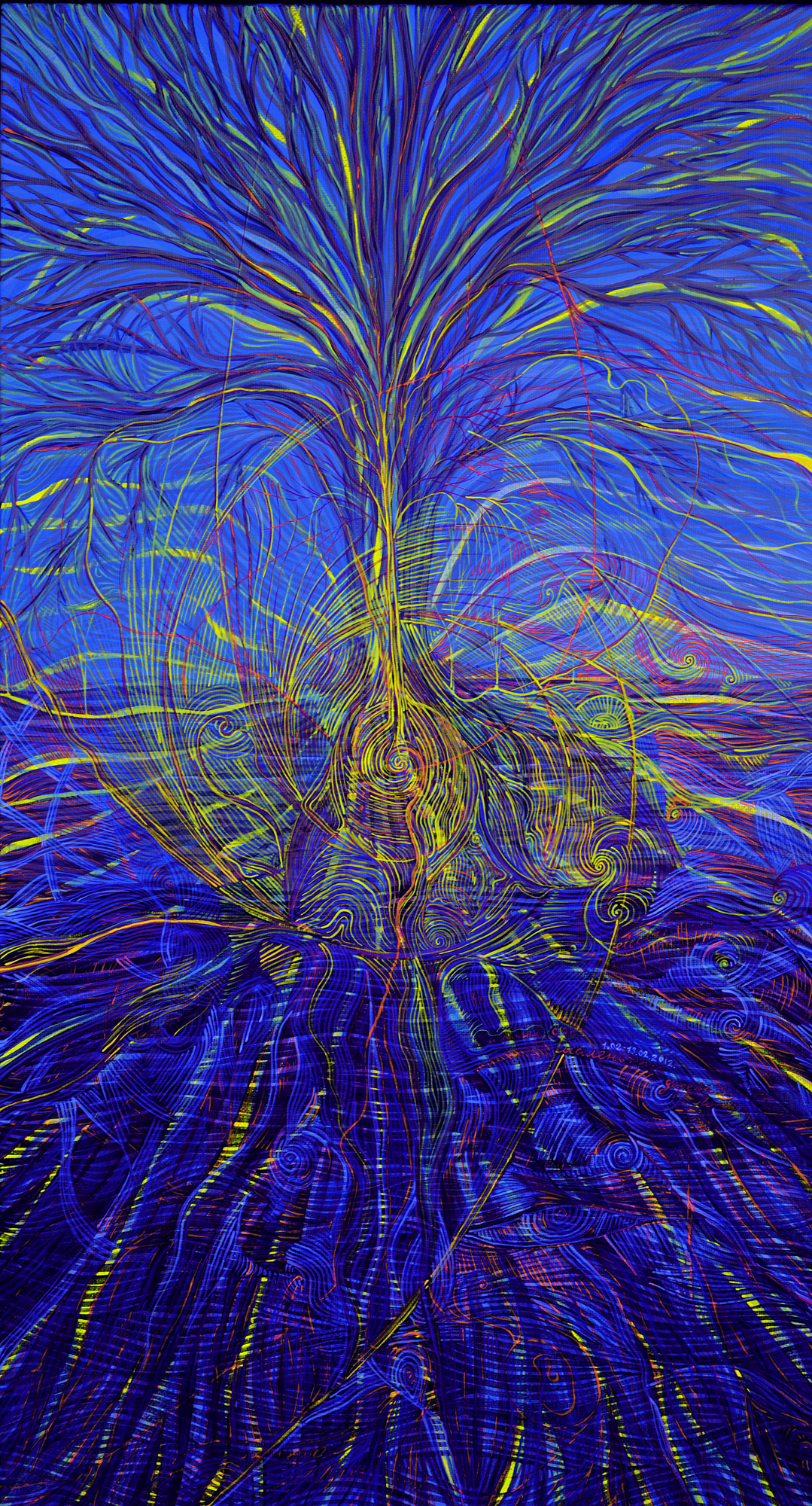
Wintery Dream of a Little Tree, by the Russian artist Lola Lonli, 2012.

Porfiry Korneyevich Ivanov was born on 20 February 1898 in the village of Orekhovka in Luhansk Oblast, Russian Empire, from the family of a miner. He graduated from the fourth grade at a parish school, and went to work at the age of 15. The situation of constant material need he endured in his childhood left an indelible imprint on his character; this, most likely, influenced the strict rules of the creed he would have later preached, such as the abstinence from excesses of food, clothing, and "unnecessary" labour. In his youth, Ivanov was known for his cocky and even hooligan character, and took part in village fistfights as the ringleader; he even served in prison for having stolen a pair of boots. During the Russian Revolution (1917–1923), he was sympathetic towards the Bolsheviks, studied Marxist literature, participated in collectivisation and in the closure of churches, and was admitted as a member of the Communist Party of the Soviet Union. He also worked as a supplier at a metallurgical plant and led an artel of workers.

When cancer struck Ivanov's body in 1933, it was a turning point in his life. After having lost any hope for a recovery in the city, he decided to hasten his death, by dying not from cancer, but from cold; he began to douse himself and to walk naked in the extreme cold. This, however, gave the opposite effect, as he began to recover from the illness. Through his health recovery, he began to have a special awareness of eternal natural forces:

I went into Nature to find death there, and found life... living forces of an imperishable kind.

25 April 1933 is celebrated by the Ivanovites as the "Birthday of the Idea", the revelation of the eternal forces of Nature which Ivanov received on the Chuvilkin Hill in his birthplace, a hill which was jokingly bequeathed to him by his father when he was a child. After the healing, Ivanov began to talk about "Nature" as a living divine personality, arguing that mankind should live without being fenced off from it by technology, and perceive Nature as it is. At the same time, Ivanov proclaimed himself as an exceptional mediator with Nature, the only "natural man of Nature" capable of teaching people about the right way of "natural existence". From this point onwards, his biography takes the style of the hagiography: like a prophet, he seeks confirmation of his exceptionality in signs, which he receives as "promptings from Nature". He allegedly healed the atrophied legs of a woman, and went to the raging sea calming a storm, amongst other wonderworks.

He subsequently adopted an itinerant lifestyle, walked barefoot and naked from chest to waist in any weather, even at −45 °C, while proclaiming himself as a teacher of divine truths, a deity, or even God himself. He began to speak in third or second person under the name Parshek (Паршек; a nickname which was given to him in childhood), and he began to keep a diary, which by the end of his life had reached the amount of more than three hundred notebooks. The style of his writing is peculiar, without punctuation and with Ukrainianisms not following the elementary rules of the Russian language, and such "Ivanov's style" is preserved at any new publication of his works. He began to preach his doctrine as broadly as possible, to state legislative bodies, to Orthodox Christian churches, wishing, as he noted, to examine them about "what they really prayed for". On one occasion he turned to the parishioners of a church and preached to them; he was immediately taken out by the clergy, but twelve parishioners followed him, among whom Valentina Sukharevskaya (Valya) became his closest disciple. He defined them as "people whom Nature has selected for us in my life".

=== 1980s ===
Porfiry Ivanov was soon prosecuted for his attitude of challenge towards authorities. He was fired from his job, arrested, sent to psychiatric hospitals, and prescribed a compulsory course of treatment. He did not give up, and with the help of his followers he appealed to the Soviet government, asking to recognise his teaching for the sake of improving the health of the population, emphasising the popular origins of such teaching, which was being "created by the people themselves". In 1982, the magazine Ogonyok (No. 8) published an article by S. Vlasov, An Experiment Half a Century Long, which sparked an outbreak of interest for Ivanovism. Shortly before Ivanov's death in 1983, one of the theoreticians of Ivanovism formulated a code of physical health and moral behaviour — the Detka — to give a first systematisation to the teaching.

After Ivanov's death at the homestead of Verkhniy Kondryuchiy in Sverdlovsk, Luhansk Oblast, his followers continued to propagate the doctrine, which after the Chernobyl disaster (1986) and the struggle against atheism received a further impetus and reached unprecedented popularity. After the disaster, hundreds of residents of Kyiv lost faith in official medicine and began to follow the Detka system. In 1987, Valentina Sukharevskaya organised the first official Ivanovite congress in Orekhovka (the birthplace of Ivanov himself), Ukraine, after which such congresses began to be held regularly on a nationwide scale. Between the late 1980s and the early 1990s, the Ivanovites published booklets about their doctrine and organised meetings and lectures throughout Russia, not only in Moscow and Saint Petersburg, but also in Vologda, Kazan, Zelenodolsk, Tver, Tyumen, Novosibirsk, Kolomna, Ufa, Kostroma, Magnitogorsk, Yakutsk, Petrozavodsk, Inta, Cherepovets, Yuzhno-Sakhalinsk, and other regional cities.

=== 1990s–2000s ===
Scientific conferences gave more space to the Ivanovite practice in the fields of official medicine and pedagogy, and the media started to broadcast about it on a large scale, even making movies about Ivanov's life. In 1991 the first conference of medical workers practising the Ivanovite method was held, and in the same year the Interregional Youth Conference of Ivanovites "My Gift of Youth" was held at the see of the Federal Assembly of Russia. In 1992 a large number of Ivanovites gathered at Chuvilkin Hill, the holiest place of the movement. An Ivanovite, N. A. Pichugin, edited Ivanov's diaries to make their style more appealing to the tastes of official cultural circles, introducing punctuation and standard spelling, and published them in 1994 as the two-volume The History of Parshek. In 1995 another conference was held at the see of the Federation Council of Russia with the participation of the representatives of ninety-seven cities of the Commonwealth of Independent States. At the same time, the Ivanovites continued to develop the doctrine of the movement on the theoretical level, initially gaining consensus, especially among the followers of Nikolay Fyodorovich Fyodorov and other proponents of Russian cosmism, and trying to cooperate with the Roerichians in the fields of ecology and pacifism. However, the cooperation with these other movements ended soon for unbridgeable doctrinal differences, as they did not recognise Ivanov's divinity. The Ivanovites continued to take part in environmentalist causes. From about 1996 onwards, Ivanovite events became more closed and intended just for believers, partly in response to a growing hostility of the Russian Orthodox Church towards the movement.

After the death of Valentina Sukharevskaya in 1990, and according to her will, the main community was led by the Matlaev spouses, headquartered at the House of Health (Дом здоровья, Dom zdorov'ya) at Verkhniy Kondryuchiy. On the other hand, a follower named Yury Gennadyevich Ivanov from Kuybysheve — sharing the surname of Porfiry Ivanov but not being related to him —, who had moved to Luhansk Oblast in the late 1980s, aspired to take the leadership of the movement and proclaimed himself the "Second Parshek", and was called by his followers the "Younger Ivanov" or the "Younger Teacher". Due to his refusal to recognise the authority of the widow of the late Porfiry Ivanov, Yury Ivanov led to a schism of the original community with the creation of a new organisation in the village of Orekhovka, the Church of the Beginnings (Истоки, Istoki).

Yury Ivanov found the rationale for proclaiming his own divinity in the words of the same Porfiry Ivanov:

They didn't recognise me. A second one will come, and they will not recognise him either.

By 2000 Yury Ivanov had already formed a community of disciples, with two buildings in the village of Orekhovka; among the disciples were the poet Yekaterina Proskurnya from Luhansk and the documentary filmmaker Pyotr Voloshin from Kyiv. On 21 April 2000, the village council of Orekhovka issued a decree making the Chuvilkin Hill and surrounding areas a protected zone of "historical, cultural and scientific value". In Moscow, Russia, another Ivanovite adherent since 1976, Aleksandr Nikitovich Sopronenkov, founded another splinter independent organisation, the Church of the Living Stream (Живой Поток, Zhivoy Potok), which conducts its ceremonies at the Bitsa Park.

== Beliefs ==
=== Theology ===
Representation of the theo-cosmology of Ivanovism.

In Ivanovite pantheistic theology, divinity is "Nature", "Birth" or "Generation" itself, Pri-Roda (Природа) in Slavic languages, always personified and written with the uppercase initial in the movement's usage. She is conceived as "the head of everything", a personal, omnipotent and ambivalent force, capable of bringing any entity to life or to death. For mankind she is conceptualisable as the "Mother Procreatrix" (Мать-Родительница, Mat'-Roditel'nitsa), who declares: "what I want, I will do in people". If she wants someone to change his unnatural way of life, Nature will send "an enemy" to challenge him, and if he still does not change his ways she will send "her forces of death, and take his life". However, if a person lives naturally, if he opens himself to Nature and unites with her, then Nature will fill him with her forces, keeping his enemy always away from him. In the Ivanovite doctrine, personified Nature also has the function of judge, inherent to her being, since when people rise from the dead — when they reincarnate — they will "answer before Nature". The Ivanovites believe that by merging with Nature one may see past and future lives and govern his incarnations.

In some of his discourses, Porfiry Ivanov also talked about Nature as the substantial medium of manifestation for a more abstract God (Бог, Bog) who comes to full consciousness in mankind, such as in the adage:

God lives on Earth in every person.

Polytheism is also contemplated, since specific natural elements, such as the four elements of Air, Earth, Fire and Water, are held to be life-giving gods inherent to Nature. Water and Earth are the most important among them in Ivanovite theology. A prominent role is that of cold water, considered a living being who may help or punish by "twisting like a ram's horn", like supreme Nature herself. Porfiry Ivanov himself, the Parshek, is deified within the movement; he is considered the "Winner of Nature", the "Teacher of Mankind", the "God of the Earth". He is considered Nature's "messenger", who "fell asleep before Nature", earned her "trust", so that he gave birth to his "undying work". According to Ivanov himself, Nature said about him:

I sent my natural man to them [the people], so that people would recognise him and consider him their own.

The Parshek and Nature are the highest sacred "divine twosome" within the movement, so that the Parshek is both a deity and a special man "dedicated" to Nature, an intercessor for people before her, who has special access to her. More precisely, Porfiry Ivanov, the Parshek, is seen as the incarnation of the "primordial man" in perfect communion with Nature. Some Ivanovites even believe that during the Great Patriotic War (1941–1945) it was Ivanov who interceded with Nature to provide the victory to the Russian army against the German army.

Some Ivanovites interpret their beliefs in a framework more similar to Christian theology: in this interpretation, the Parshek is an incarnation of God like the Christ. Ivanov's metamorphosis is interpreted as an integration of his consciousness into the Holy Spirit, the energy field of the universe. The Parshek would represent the age of the Holy Spirit, which comes to replace the older Christianity of the Father and the Son. Some believers also interpret the life trials and the social unrecognition which Ivanov endured as a kenosis ("emptying") — an ego-shattering experience of fall to the very bottom of inhuman suffering — of "God in the flesh", which prepared him for being a saviour for godless sinners.

=== Cosmology and eschatology ===
Ivanovite cosmology recognises a universal energetic field of Nature which shapes the planet Earth and the entire cosmos, aligning with theories of energism and noospherology also present in Russian cosmism; Porfiry Ivanov and his teachings would allow the adepts to attune with this universal energetic field. Ivanovism has an eschatological component: the mission of Ivanov is not considered as finished, as it would be completed with a universal earthly healing — a resurrection from "death" intended as ordinary life ensnared in the technocratic civilisation and not aligned with Nature — led by the Parshek himself. Ivanovite teachings also contain a myth about a Golden Age in the past when the original mankind lived in harmony with Nature:

The first one born by Nature did not need anything. He laid around lively, energised, and there was much that had not been begun. He was the God of all things, the preserver of all natural wealth. His spirit enlightened us as our dear Teacher. He remained the same as he was. He is still like that!

Besides eschatology in mystical terms, Ivanov emphasised the importance of the folk as an organic living entity threatened by the evils of technocracy, capitalism and individualism, teaching how "life inequality" generates "distrust, alienation, anger and hatred" among people and how the disruption of society when people "do only what they need" generates sickness. Ivanov's anti-capitalist stance was clear when he declared that those people who live only for profit are "mentally ill", and was clear in his thought about class division which did not accept the distinction between workers and intellectuals. He pointed out that intellectuals working for monetary interest have produced nothing but technocratic lies ensnaring reality and the true living flow of Nature. Ivanov also rejected Darwinism, the theory of the survival of the fittest, as part of the same capitalistic and individualistic stream of ideas against Nature. Despite some collaboration of the Ivanovites with the authorities in the last decade of the Soviet Union, Ivanov also criticised communism because of its atheism and its absolute reliance on technoscience, ultimately leading the Ivanovites to distrust towards both capitalism and communism as equally "alien to Nature". Ivanov said that this unnatural ideological stream would have led its ideologues and all those humans who follow it to destruction, "because Nature does not like it".

== Practices ==
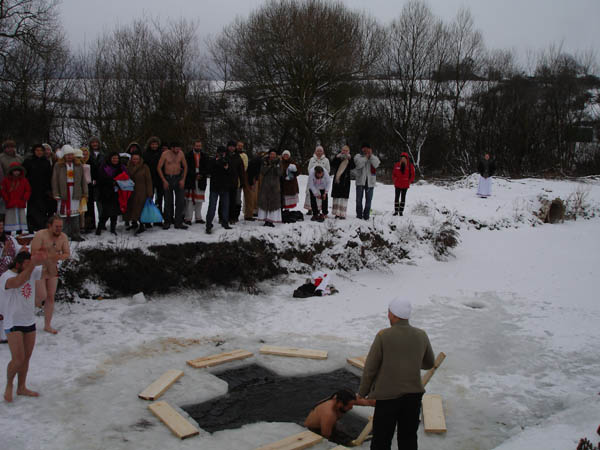
Ukrainian Rodnovers celebrating the holiday of Vodokhreshche with baths in frozen water.

Porfiry Ivanov taught about the possibility for humanity to reach immortality by merging with the power of Nature. He therefore formulated a system of ritual practice based on twelve commandments teaching how to harden the body and the spirit, and how to behave towards Nature and other people. This system is called prosaically "hardening training" and is described in the Detka (Детка, "Child") code. The twelve instructions are: ① bathe twice a day in natural cold water and always finish a hot bath with a cold one; ② swim, possibly in Nature, and before or after having swum run barefoot in the natural environment, even in winter with snow for two or three minutes; ③ do not drink alcohol or smoke; ④ try to avoid food and water completely at least once a week from 6–8 PM on Friday to 12 AM on Sunday; ⑤ at 12 AM on Sunday go out in nature barefoot; ⑥ love Nature around you and do not spit anything around; ⑦ greet everyone everywhere; ⑧ help the others; ⑨ overcome greed, laziness, complacency, theft, fear, hypocrisy, pride in yourself; ⑩ free your head from thoughts of illness, malaise and death; ⑪ do not separate thought from its effects; ⑫ tell to others and pass on your experience of this system.

However, the Detka is not merely an ethical and physiotherapeutic method, as it is considered ineffective without a connection with the Parshek in order to receive his energy — without it, the practice would be incomplete. Those who decide to live according to the full program of the "hardening training" have to undergo an initiation rite which was administered by Porfiry Ivanov himself when he was alive, and later by Valentina Sukharevskaya and the following leaders of the early Ivanovite community. This rite involves a psychotechnical practice, described by Ivanov himself as follows:

By transmitting my willpower at a distance, like invisible radio waves, I first throw my thoughts into the heights, into the very depths of the universe, and then down into the depths of water and earth, and then to all living beings offended in Nature, and finally to man. I penetrate into his body with my inner vision and sensation, starting from the brain and reaching into the toes and the fingers, and the heart and the lungs, and into all other organs, except for the stomach which may not even be recalled.

The last line, "except for the stomach which may not even be recalled", is a hint to the refusal of plants and animals for food, since the ultimate goal of the "hardening training" system is to lead the believer to live without food at all, getting energy from air, water and earth, becoming autotrophous by acquiring aether from the elements. This ultimate condition is believed to be that of immortality.

The Ivanovites organise themselves in village communities, called "heavenly places" or "paradises" (райское место, rayskoye mesto). The main holy place of Ivanovism is the Chuvilkin Hill in the birthplace of Ivanov himself, that is Orekhovka, in Luhansk Oblast, eastern Ukraine, where according to the mythology of the movement Ivanov received the revelation from Nature. Such hill is the site of an ancient Slavic temple, and, according to the Ivanovites, there Nature would manifest her miraculous powers to the highest degree. In their villages and holy places, the Ivanovites conduct rituals that in many ways are similar to those of broader Rodnovery. The Hymn to Life (Гимн Жизни, Gimn Zhizni) one of the three main holy texts of Ivanovism, is sung by the believers every day at sunrise and sunset on notes that resemble those of La Marseillaise.

== Demographics ==
Ivanovism is centred in eastern Ukraine, the region of origin of Ivanov himself, and it is widespread in Russia. The scholar Natalya V. Prokopyuk noted that Ivanovism was one of the first social movements which arose in the last phase of the Soviet Union and spread on a massive scale, not only in the big cities but all throughout Russia. In 2000, the scholar Alexey V. Gaidukov wrote of Ivanovites as "numbering several tens of thousands". In 2006, the scholar Boris Knorre reported that the original church headquartered at Verkhniy Kondryuchiy, in Sverdlovsk, Luhansk Oblast, Ukraine, had "about 10,000 members". The scholar Victor Shnirelman reported in 2008 that Ivanovism was estimated to have "a few dozen thousand followers". Knorre documented that the movement was present in all the constituent entities of Russia, not only in significant urban centres but also in small settlements. The adherents were mostly Russians and Ukrainians by ethnicity, although adherents from all the ethnic groups of Russia were present too.

Based on Porfiry Ivanov's teachings about the unnaturalness of both capitalism and communism, many Ivanovites eschew political ideologies and tend to apoliticism. On the other hand, some of the earliest disciples of the Church of the Beginnings of Yury Ivanov, the first branching of the original Ivanovite community, are communist and members of the Communist Party of Ukraine. Some of the organisations of the Ivanovite movement have charitable branches and a mediatic outreach, with the Church of the Beginnings (Orekhovka) and the Church of the Living Stream (Moscow) publishing the homonymous magazines Origins (Istoki) and Living Stream (Zhivoy Potok) as of 2006. The Ivanovites have been known for their proselytism, believing that they are engaged in a mission to save humanity and conducting their search for new adepts by holding lessons in schools and kindergartens and by disseminating written material.

== See also ==
- Rodnovery
  - Peterburgian Vedism
  - Anastasianism
- Taoism
- Eastern religions

== Sources ==
=== References ===
- Aitamurto, Kaarina (2016). Paganism, Traditionalism, Nationalism: Narratives of Russian Rodnoverie. London and New York: Routledge. ISBN 9781472460271.
- Balagushkin, Evgeny G. (2008). "Ивановцы" [Ivanovites] (PDF). Энциклопедия религий (in Russian). pp. 474–476. ISBN 9785829110840.
- Gaidukov, Alexey V. (2000). Идеология и практика славянского неоязычества [Ideology and practice of Slavic Neopaganism] (PDF) (Thesis) (in Russian). Saint Petersburg: Herzen University. Archived from the original (PDF) on 22 October 2021.
- Ivakhiv, Adrian (2005). "In Search of Deeper Identities: Neopaganism and 'Native Faith' in Contemporary Ukraine" (PDF). Nova Religio: The Journal of Alternative and Emergent Religions. 8 (3): 7–38. doi:10.1525/nr.2005.8.3.7. JSTOR 10.1525/nr.2005.8.3.7. Archived from the original (PDF) on 14 February 2020.
- Knorre, Boris (2006). "Система Порфирия Иванова: культ и движение" [The system of Porfiry Ivanov: cult and movement]. In Bourdeaux, Michael; Filatov, Sergey (eds.). Современная религиозная жизнь России. Опыт систематического описания [Contemporary religious life of Russia. Systematic description of experiences] (in Russian). Vol. 4. Moscow: Keston Institute; Logos. pp. 244–257. ISBN 5987040574.
- Prokopyuk, Natalya Valeryevna (2017). Неоязычество в современной России [Neopaganism in modern Russia] (Thesis) (in Russian). Tomsk: Tomsk State University.
- Shnirelman, Victor A. (2008). "Neo-paganism and Ethnic Nationalism in Eastern Europe" (PDF). In Taylor Bron (ed.). The Encyclopedia of Religion and Nature. A&C Black. pp. 1186–1188. ISBN 9781441122780. Archived from the original (PDF) on 19 January 2019.
