= Slavic Native Faith's theology and cosmology =

Rodnover theological and cosmological doctrines

Ancestral/genealogical origin (rodovoy iskon) is based on rodolyubiye ("generosity", the love for the kin/family and the love of the kin/family). Rod ("Kin/Genus/Generation") is understood by us as the indissoluble unity of three components: "Rod in Itself" (Rod kak Sam) – "All-Being" (Vse-Sushchiy), "All-God" (Vse-Bog), "All-Keeper" (Vse-Derzhitel') – the single all-pervading spiritual principle; "Heavenly Rod" (Rod Nebesniy) – the power of the ancestors, the celestial forces of the kin; and "Earthly Rod" (Rod Zemnoy) – the aggregate of congeners, the terrestrial family. Native gods (rodniye bogi) are the essences of the faces of the single Rod, his creative powers, comprehended by us in our personal spiritual experience. These forces are manifested both in the surrounding nature and in ourselves. (So, for example, the power of Perun in nature is thunderstorm, in the human heart it is the will to overwhelm.) Through the protective glorification of the gods at the ceremony, we reunite the internal and the external, thereby gaining spiritual harmony, spiritual integrity and bodily health.

— Volkhv Veleslav (Ilya Cherkasov)'s explanation of fundamental Rodnover theory and practice, in the Izvednik, 2003.

Slavic Native Faith (Rodnovery) has a theology that is generally monistic, consisting in the vision of a transcendental, supreme God (Rod, "Generator") which begets the universe and lives immanentised as the universe itself (pantheism and panentheism), present in decentralised and autonomous way in all its phenomena, generated by a multiplicity of deities which are independent hypostases, facets, particles or energies of the consciousness and will of the supreme God itself.

A popular dictum is "God is singular and plural". Polytheism, that is the worship of the gods or spirits, and ancestors, the facets of the supreme Rod generating all phenomena, is an integral part of Rodnovers' beliefs and practices. The universe is described as a "dialectically unfolding manifestation" of the single transcendental beginning, end each subsequent emanation, every deity and entity, is endowed with ontological freedom, spontaneous will to life and co-creation with the supreme law of God (Prav, "Right") in the great oneness of which they are part.

The swastika-like kolovrat (e.g.) is the symbol of Rodnovery. According to the studies of Boris Rybakov, whirl and wheel symbols, represent the supreme Rod and its manifestation as the many gods. The vision of Rodnover theology has been variously defined as manifestationism, and rodotheism or genotheism.

== Theological stances ==
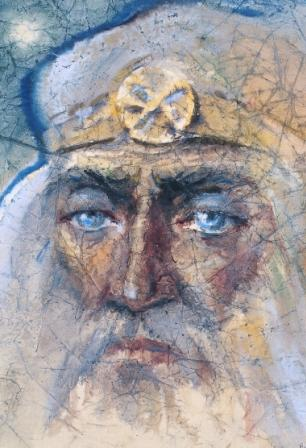
Icon of the highest God (Rod) in human shape, in a Sylenkoite temple in Ukraine.

Prior to their Christianisation, the Slavic peoples were polytheists, worshipping multiple deities who were subordinate to a supreme but impersonal creator god. According to Helmold's Chronica Slavorum (compiled 1168–1169), "obeying the duties assigned to them, [the deities] have sprung from his [the supreme God's] blood and enjoy distinction in proportion to their nearness to the god of the gods". Belief in these deities varied according to location and through time, and it was common for the Slavs to adopt deities from neighbouring cultures.

Both in Russia and in Ukraine, modern Rodnovers are divided among those who are monotheists and those who are polytheists; in other words, some emphasise a unitary principle of divinity, while others put emphasis on the distinct gods and goddesses. Some Rodnovers even describe themselves as atheists, believing that gods are not real entities but rather symbolic and/or archetypal.

Nevertheless, monotheism and polytheism are not regarded as mutually exclusive. The shared underpinning is a pantheistic view that is holistic in its understanding of the universe. A common interpretation of ancient Slavic beliefs among modern Rodnovers is that of monism, by which the many different gods (polytheism) are seen as manifestations of the single, universal impersonal God—generally identified by the concept of Rod, also known as Sud ("Judge") and Prabog ("Pre-God", "First God") among South Slavs. The Rodnover movement of Peterburgian Vedism calls this concept "One God" (Единый Бог, Yediny Bog) or "All God" (Всебог, Vsebog). Rod is generally equated with Odin of Germanic Heathenry.

=== Monotheism and polytheism ===
==== Monotheism ====
In Ukraine, there has been a debate as to whether the religion should be monotheistic or polytheistic. In keeping with the pre-Christian belief systems of the region, the groups who inherit Volodymyr Shaian's tradition, among others, espouse polytheism. Conversely, Lev Sylenko's Native Ukrainian National Faith (RUNVira for short, also called "Sylenkoism") regards itself as monotheistic and focuses its worship upon a single God whom they identify by the name Dazhboh, interpreted as the life-giving energy of the cosmos.

Sylenko characterised Dazhboh as "light, endlessness, gravitation, eternity, movement, action, the energy of unconscious and conscious being". Based on this description, Ivakhiv argued that Sylenkoite theology might better be regarded as pantheistic or panentheistic rather than monotheistic. Sylenko acknowledged that the ancient Slavs were polytheists but believed that a monotheistic view reflected an evolution in human spiritual development and thus should be adopted. A similar view is espoused by Russian Ynglism, while another distinctively monotheistic Rodnover movement that has been compared to Sylenkoism is Russian Kandybaism. Lesiv reported about a Sylenkoite follower who said that "we cannot believe in various forest, field and water spirits today. Yes, our ancestors believed in these things but we should not any longer", as polytheism is regarded as obsolete within the religion. Some polytheist Rodnovers have deemed the view adopted by Sylenko's followers as an inauthentic approach to the religion.

==== Polytheism and pantheons ====
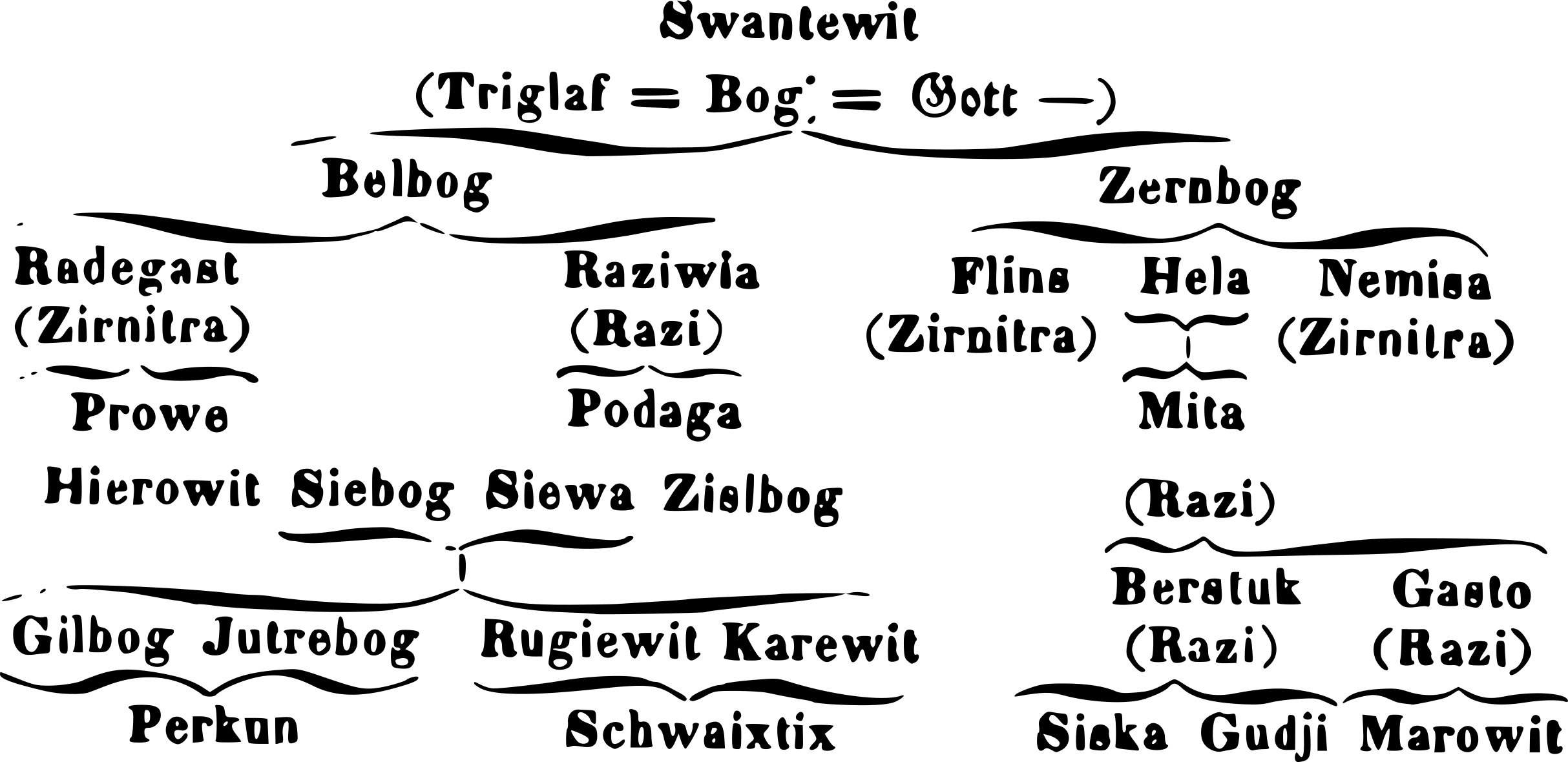
Northwestern Slavic hierarchy of the divine, as proposed by Ignác Jan Hanuš in 1842.

Pantheons of deities are not unified among practitioners of Slavic Native Faith. Different Rodnover groups often have a preference for a particular deity over others. Some Rodnover groups espouse the idea that specific Slavic populations are the progeny of different gods; for instance, groups relying upon the tenth-century manuscript The Lay of Igor's Host may affirm the idea that Russians are the grandchildren of Dazhbog (the "Giving God", "Day God"). The Union of Slavic Rodnover Communities founded and led by Vadim Kazakov recognises a pantheon of over thirty deities emanated by the supreme Rod; these include attested deities from Slavic pre-Christian and folk traditions, Slavicised Hindu deities (such as Vyshen, i.e. Vishnu, and Intra, i.e. Indra), Iranian deities (such as Simargl and Khors), deities from the Book of Veles (such as Pchelich), and figures from Slavic folk tales such as the wizard Koschei. Rodnovers also worship tutelary deities of specific elements, lands and environments, such as waters, forests and the household. Gods may be subject to functional changes among modern Rodnovers; for instance, the traditional god of livestock and poetry Veles is called upon as the god of literature and communication.

=== Deities as aspects of Rod ===
In the Russian and Ukrainian centres of Rodnover theology, the concept of Rod has been emphasised as particularly important. According to the publication Izvednik, a compilation of views on theology and cosmology of various Rodnover organisations, "the rest of the gods are only his faces, noumena, incarnations, hypostases", it is a God similar to the cosmos of ancient Greek philosophy in that it is "not the master of the universe, but it itself the universe". While most Rodnovers call it Rod, others call its visible manifestation Svarog or Nebo ("Heaven"), and still others refer to its triune cosmic manifestation, Triglav ("Three-Headed One"): Prav→Yav-Nav, Svarog→Belobog-Chernobog, Svarog→Dazhbog-Stribog, or Dub→Snop-Did. Rod is also "Time" (Kolo), scanned by the cycle of the Sun, ad reflected in the turning of the hours, the days, the months, the seasons, and the year.

The root *rod is attested in sources about pre-Christian religion referring to divinity and ancestrality. Mathieu-Colas defines Rod as the "primordial God", but the term also literally means the generative power of the family and "kin", "birth", "origin" and "fate" as well. Rod is the all-pervading, omnipresent spiritual "life force", which also gives life to any community of related entities, as defined by the Russian volkhvs Veleslav (Ilya Cherkasov) and Dobroslav (Aleksey Dobrovolsky). Its negative form, urod, means anything that is wrenched, deformed, degenerated, monstrous, anything that is "outside" the spiritual community of Rod and bereft of its virtues. Sometimes, the meaning of the word is left deliberately obscure among Rodnovers, allowing for a variety of different interpretations.

==== Manifestationism ====
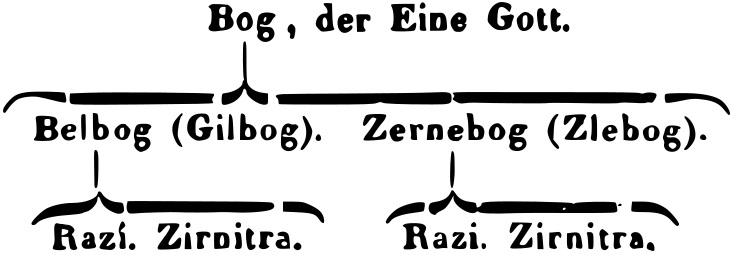
Hierarchy of the divine, with the two categories proceeding from the supreme God, as illustrated by Georg F. Creuzer and Franz J. Mone in 1822. All deities are manifestations of either Belobog or Chernobog, and in both categories they may be either Razi, rede-givers, or Zirnitra, dragon wizards.

Cosmologically speaking, Rod is conceived as the spring of universal emanation, which articulates in a cosmic hierarchy of gods. When emphasising this monism, Rodnovers may define themselves as rodnianin, "believers in God" (or "in nativity", "in genuinity"). Already the pioneering Ukrainian leader Volodymyr Shaian argued that God manifests as a variety of different deities.

This theological explanation is called "manifestationism" by some contemporary Rodnovers, and implies the idea of a spirit–matter continuum; the different gods, who proceed from the supreme God, generate differing categories of things not as their external creations (as objects), but embodying themselves as these entities. In their view, beings are the progeny of gods; even phenomena such as the thunder are conceived in this way as embodiments of these gods (in this case, Perun).

In the wake of this theology, it is common among Slavic Native Faith practitioners to say that "we are not God's slaves, but God's sons", many of them emphasising the ontological freedom of the different subsequent emanations so that the world is viewed as a "dialectical manifestation" of the single transcendental beginning and continuous co-creation of the diversified gods and the entities which they generate. The Russian volkhv Velimir (Nikolay Speransky), emphasises a dualistic eternal struggle between white gods and black gods, elder forces of creation and younger forces of destruction; the former collectively represented by Belobog and the latter by Chernobog, also symbolising the spiritual and the material. Such dualism does not represent absolute good and evil, but the black gods become evil when acting out of agreement with older and stronger white gods.

=== Ancestor worship ===
In her theological commentaries to the Book of Veles, the Ukrainian Rodnover leader Halyna Lozko emphasises the cosmological unity of the three planes of Heaven, Earth and humanity between them. She gives a definition of Rodnover theology and cosmology as "genotheism". God, hierarchically manifesting as different hypostases, a multiplicity of gods emerging from the all-pervading force Svarog, is genetically (rodovid) linked to humanity. On the human plane God is incarnated by the progenitors/ancestors and the kin lineage, in the Earth. Ethics and morality ultimately stem from this cosmology, as harmony with nature is possible only in the relationship between an ethnic group and its own land. The same vision of a genetic essence of divinity is called "rodotheism" by the Ynglists.

This is also the meaning of the worship of human progenitors, whether the Slavs' and Aryans' great forefather Or or Oryi, or local forefathers such as Dingling worshipped by Vladivostok Rodnovers. Divine ancestors are the spirits who generate and hold together kins, they are the kins themselves. The Russian volkhv Dobroslav emphasises the importance of blood heritage, since, according to him, the violation of kinship purity brings about the loss of the relationship with the kin's divine ancestor. The Ukrainian Rodnover and scholar Yury Shylov has developed a theory of God as a spiral "information field" that expresses itself in self-conscious humanity, which comes to full manifestation in the Indo-European "Saviour" archetype.

== Cosmology ==
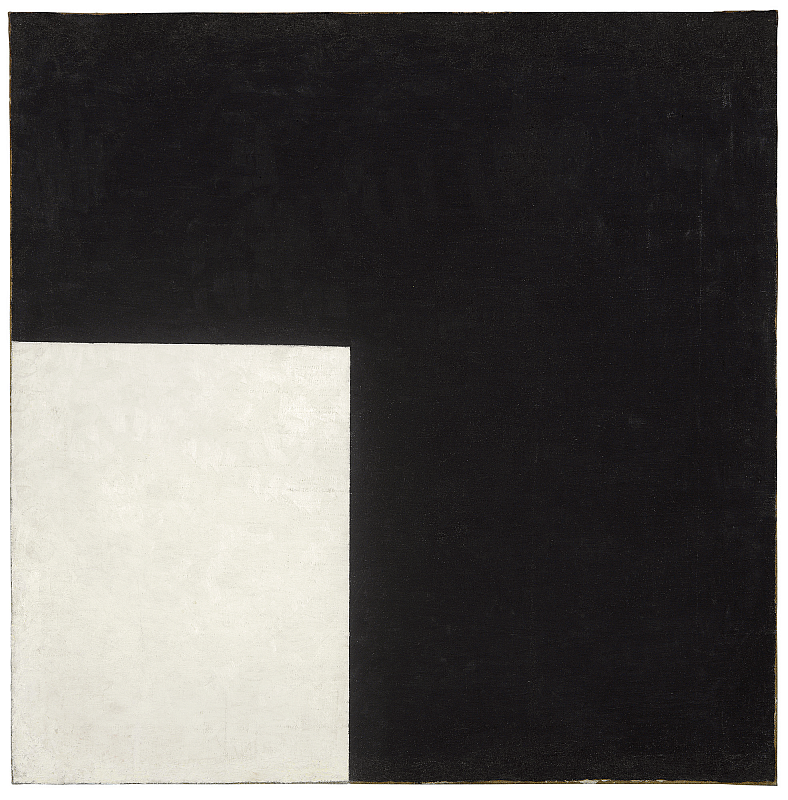
Black and White. Suprematist Composition—Kazimir Malevich, 1915. According to Miroslav Shkandrij, the Russian Suprematist artist was influenced by a dual cosmology found in various folk beliefs, including Belobog and Chernobog.

=== Dual dynamism: Belobog and Chernobog ===
According to the Book of Veles, and to the doctrine accepted by many Rodnover organisations, the supreme Rod begets Prav (literally "Right" or "Order"; cf. Greek Orthotes, Sanskrit Ṛta) in primordial undeterminacy (chaos), giving rise to the circular pattern of Svarog ("Heaven", "Sky"; cf. Sanskrit Svarga), which constantly multiplies generating new worlds (world-eggs). Prav is Rod itself manifesting as the universe. Prav works by means of a dual dynamism, represented by Belobog ("White God") and Chernobog ("Black God"); described as the "second tier" in the cosmological hierarchy, they are two aspects of "spontaneous division" of the same oneness of Rod, appearing in reality as elder white gods of creation and younger black gods of destruction, the forces of waxing and waning, giving rise to polarities like up and down, bright and dark, masculine and feminine, singular and plural. The younger black gods have always to act in accordance with stronger white gods, otherwise they generate evil. The Belobog–Chernobog duality is also represented on the human plane as the Perun–Veles duality, where the former is the principle of martiality and the latter is the principle of mystical philosophy. Man and woman are further symbolised by father Svarog itself and mother Lada.

This supreme polarity is also represented by the relation between Rod and Rozanica, literally the "Generatrix", the mother goddess who expresses herself as the three goddesses who interweave destiny (Rozanicy, also known as Sudenicy among South Slavs, where Rod is also known as Sud, "Judge"). She is also known as Raziwia, Rodiwa or simply Dewa ("Goddess"), regarded as the singular goddess of whom all lesser goddesses are manifestations. In kinships, while Rod represents the forefathers from the male side, Rozanica represents the ancestresses from the female side. Through the history of the Slavs, the latter gradually became more prominent than the former, because of the importance of the mother to the newborn child.

=== Trialism: Prav, Yav and Nav ===
According to the Book of Veles, reality has three dimensions, namely the aforementioned Prav, plus Yav and Nav. The three are identified with different names by different groups. Prav ("Right") itself is the level of the gods, who generate entities according to the supreme order of Rod; gods and the entities that they beget "make up" the great Rod. Yav ("actuality" or "manifestation") is the level of matter and appearance, the here and now in which things appear in light, coalesce, but also dissolve in contingency; Nav ("probability" or "unmanifestation") is the thin world of human ancestors, of spirit, consisting in the memory of the past and the projection of the future, that is to say the continuity of time. Prav, the universal cosmic order otherwise described as the "Law of Heaven", permeates and regulates the other two hypostases. They are also described, respectively, as the world of bright gods, the world of mankind, and the world of dark gods.

==== Triglav ====
Scheme of Triglav's cosmology, as conceived by many Rodnovers.

In duality, the supreme Rod's luminous aspect (Belobog) manifests ultimately as threefold, Triglav ("Three-Headed One"). The first of the three persons is the aforementioned Svarog ("Heaven"), and the other two are Svarog's further expressions as Perun ("Thunder") and Svetovid (the "Worldseer", itself four-faced). They correspond to the three dimensions of the cosmos, and to the three qualities of soul, flesh and power. Svarog represents Prav itself and soul, Perun represents Yav and flesh, and Svetovit represents Nav and spiritual power. The Triglav is not a combination of gods, but the theological representation of the triadic principle which underlies reality.

According to Shnirelman, this triune vision and associations were codified by Yury P. Mirolyubov and further elaborated by Valery Yemelyanov, both interpreters of the Book of Veles. In olden times, already Ebbo documented that the Triglav was seen as embodying the connection and mediation between Heaven, Earth and the underworld. Adam of Bremen described the Triglav of Wolin as Neptunus triplicis naturae (that is to say "Neptune of the three natures/generations") attesting the colours that were associated to the three worlds, then further studied by Karel Jaromír Erben: white for Heaven, green for Earth and black for the underworld. Other names of the two manifestations of Svarog are Dazhbog ("Giving God", "Day God") and Svarozhich (the god of fire, literally meaning "Son of Heaven"). According to the studies of Jiří Dynda, the three faces of Triglav are rather Perun in the heavenly plane (instead of Svarog), Svetovid in the centre from which the horizontal four directions unfold, and Veles in the underworld. The netherworld, especially in its dark aspect, is indeed traditionally embodied by Veles, who in this function is the god of waters but also the one who guides athwart them in the function of psychopomp (cf. Sanskrit Varuna). Veles is the master of the material world, who magically creates, destroys and synthesises all contradictory tendences; he is associated with the forests and with animals, chiefly the bear, the wolf and the cattle — the Slavic priests themselves, known as volkhvs (a derivative of volk, "wolf"), are his impersonators.

In his study of Slavic cosmology, Dynda compares this axis mundi concept to similar ones found in other Indo-European cultures. He gives weight to the Triglav as a representation of what Georges Dumézil studied as the "Indo-European trifunctional hypothesis" (holy, martial and economic functions reflected by three human types and social classes). The Triglav also represents the interweaving of the three dimensions of time, metaphorically represented as a three-threaded rope. By Ebbo's words, the Triglav is summus deus, the god representing the "sum" of the three dimensions of reality as a mountain or tree (themselves symbols of the axis mundi). In a more abstract theoretical formulation, Dynda says that the three (Triglav) completes the two by springing out as the middle term between the twosome (Belobog and Chernobog), and in turn the threesome implicates the four (Svetovid) as its own middle term of potentiality. The threefold vertical axle intersecting the fourfold horizontal directions is also mythologically represented as the ninefold world tree, whose different "worlds" are accessible to those people who have achieved corresponding stages of enlightenment.

=== Svetovid as a divine tetrad ===
Scheme of Svetovid's cosmology, as conceived by many Rodnovers.

Svetovid ("Worldseer", or more accurately "Lord of Power" or "Lord of Holiness", the root *svet defining the "miraculous and beneficial power", or holy power) is the four-faced god of war and light, and "the most complete reflection of the Slavic cosmological conception", the union of the four horizontal directions of space with the three vertical tiers of the cosmos (Heaven, Earth and the underworld), and with the three times. Helmold defined Svetovid as deus deorum ("god of all gods"); Dynda further defines Svetovid, by Jungian words, as a "fourfold (quaternitas) potentiality which comes true in threefoldness (triplicitas)". His four faces are the masculine Svarog ("Heaven", associated to the north direction and the colour white) and Perun ("Thunder", the west and red), and the feminine Mokosh ("Wetness", the east and green) and Lada ("Beauty", the south and black). The four directions and colours also represent the four Slavic lands of original sacred topography. (Note: The four faces of Svetovid, the four colours and four directions, also correspond to the four Russias of folk cosmology: White Ruthenia, Red Ruthenia, the Black Sea regions and Green Ukraine. See: Svetovid in the Ukrainian Soviet Encyclopedic Dictionary, 1987.) They also represent the spinning of the four seasons.

Ultimately, Svetovid embodies in unity the supreme duality (Belobog and Chernobog) through which Rod manifests itself as Prav, and the axial interconnection of the three times with the four dimensions of present space. In other words, he represents Prav spiritualising Yav as Nav; or Svarog manifesting as spirit (Perun) in the material world governed by Veles. Dynda says that this conception reflects a common Indo-European spiritual vision of the cosmos, the same which was also elaborated in early and medieval Christianity as God who is at the same time creator (father), creature (son) and creating activity (spirit).

== See also ==
- Slavic Native Faith

Variations

- Anastasian theology
- Bazhovite theology
- Ivanovite theology
- Kandybaite theology
- Levashovite theology
- Peterburgian Vedic theology
- Sylenkoite theology
- Vseyasvetnik theology
- Ynglist theology
