= List of Slavic Native Faith organisations =

List of organisations of Slavic Native Faith (Rodnovery) by country. Some organisations have their headquarters and major following in one country but have branches in other countries as well.

== Slavic countries ==
=== Belarus ===
- "Belarusian Ecological Union" (Белорусский Экологический Союз);
- "Centre of Ethnocosmology–Kriya" (Belarusian: Цэнтр Этнакасмалогіі "Крыўя");
- "Commonwealth of Rodoviches" (Rodnovers);
- "Darateya Centre" (Центр "Даратэя");
- "School of the Slavic Health Tradition" (Школа "Традиции Здоровья Славян"), also called "Order of the Slavic Circle" (Орден "Славянский Круг").

=== Bosnia and Herzegovina ===
- "Circle of Svarog" (Svaroži Krug) within the movement "Praskozorje".

=== Bulgaria ===
- "Bulgarian Horde 1938";
- "Dulo Alliance";
- "Warriors of Tangra movement" (Движение "Воини на Тангра").

=== Croatia ===
- "Union of Croatian Rodnovers" (Savez hrvatskih rodnovjeraca).

=== Czechia ===
- "Rodná víra" (Native Faith), of Richard Bigl (Khotebud);
- "Tři Světy" (Three realms)
- "Yarowit's kin".

=== Poland ===
Registered religious organizations:

- Native Polish Church (Rodzimy Kościół Polski);
- "ZW Rodzima Wiara";
- Religious Organisation of Polish Rodnovers "Kin" (Związek Wyznaniowy Rodzimowierców Polskich "Ród");
- Polish Slavic Church (Polski Kościół Słowiański);
- West Slavic Religious Association "Slavic Faith" (Zachodniosłowiański Związek Wyznaniowy Słowiańska Wiara).

Informal groups and associations:

- "Białożar Group" (Gromada Białożar);
- Free Group "Enclave" (Wolna Grupa "Enklawa");
- Lodz Rodnover Community "Wolfish Circle" (Łódzka Wspólnota Rodzimowiercza "Wilczy Krąg");
- "MIR–Silesian Group of Rodnovers" (MIR–Śląska Grupa Rodzimowierców);
- "Raróg Group" (Gromada Raróg);
- Rodnover Confederation (Konfederacja Rodzimowiercza):
  - "Circle of Radegast" (Krąg Radogost);
  - "Drzewo Przodków" association;
  - "Gontyna" association;
  - "Kałdus" association;
  - Association of Pomeranian Rodnovers "Jantar" (Stowarzyszenie Rodzimowierców Pomorskich "Jantar");
  - "ZW Rodzima Wiara";
  - "Swarga" Group (Gromada "Swarga");
  - "Wanda" Group (Gromada "Wanda");
  - "WiD Group";
  - "Watra" Rodnover Community (Wspólnota Rodzimowierców "Watra");
  - "Żertwa" association;
- "Ślęża Rodnovers" (Rodzimowiercy Ślężańscy);
- "Free Rodnovers of Kraków" (Wolni Rodzimowiercy Krakowa).

=== Russia ===
As of 2003, the Russian Ministry of Justice had registered forty Rodnover organisations, while there were "probably several hundred of them in existence".

- "All-Russian Religious Union–Russian Folk Faith" (Всероссийский Религиозный Союз "Русская Народная Вера") of Irina O. Volkova (Krada Veles);
- "Alliance of Natural Faith–Slavya" of Moscow;
- "Association of Slavic-hill Wrestling Fighters" (see Slavic-Hill Rodnovery);
- "Church of the Nav" (Це́рковь На́ви);
- "Circle of Pagan Tradition" (Круг Языческой Традиции);
- "Commonwealth of Pagan Communities of Siberia–Siberian Veche" (Содружество Языческих Общин Сибири "Сибирское Вече");
- "Commonwealth of Slavic Rodnovery Communities–Circle of Veles" (Содружество Славянских Родноверческих Общин "Велесов Круг"):
  - "Satya-Veda Aryan Pagan Community" / "Russian-Slavic Rodnover Community–Rodolyubiye" of Moscow, of Ilya Cherkasov (Veleslav);
  - "Obninsk Rodnover Community–Triglav";
  - "Kostroma Rodnover Community–Khorovod";
  - "Ryazan Rodnover Community–Troyesvet";
- "Communities of East Slavic Folk Natural Fath–Volga Frontier" (Сообщества Восточнославянской Народной Природной Веры "Волжский Рубеж") of Vada Petrovich Kruchin;
- "House of the Ash-Tree" (Дом Ясеня) and "Foundation for the Development of Traditional Culture" (Фондом Развития Традиционной Культуры) of A.V. Platov (Iggvolod);
- "Koliada Viatichey" (Коляда Вятичей) organisation of Nikolai Speransky (Velimir);
- "Krasnodar Slavic Orthodox Community–Vedic Culture of Russian Aryans";
- "Krina" of Saint Petersburg, of Andrei Rezunkov (Blagumil);
- "Kupala Centre" of Grigory Yakutovsky (Vseslav);
- Peterburgian Vedism:
  - "Union of the Veneds" (Союз Венедов) of Oleg Gusev and Roman Perin;
  - Two other "Unions of the Veneds";
  - "Society of the Mages" (Obshchestvo Volkhvov);
  - "Skhoron ezh Sloven" (Схорон еж Словен), former "Shag Volka" organisation, of Vladimir Y. Golyakov;
- "Pravovedi" of Kolomna, of Elena Martynova (Ma-Lena);
- "Ringing Cedars" (Anastasianism);
- "Russian Public Movement "Course of Truth and Unity"" (Российское Общенародное Движение "Курсом Правды и Единения");
- Russian Public Movement of Renaissance–Golden Age (Русское Общественное Движение "Возрождение. Золотой Век", РОД ВЗВ) (see Levashovism);
- "Russian Religious Church" (see Kandybaism);
- "Russian Warriors";
- "School of Wolves";
- "Slavic Community of Svetovid" of Slavyansk-na-Kubani;
- "Slavic Orthodox Community–Shield of Simargl" of Vladivostok;
- "Spiritual-Native Sovereign Rus'" (Dukhovno-Rodovaia Derzhava Rus);
- "Svarozhichi" of Yekaterinburg and the Ural region, of Alexey Dobrovolsky (Dobroslav);
- "Svyatogor Warrior Centre" of Kolomna;
- "Tezaurus Spiritual Union" (Authentism);
- "Way of Troyan" (Тропа Троянова);
- "Tur" Gentile Community of Izhevsk;
- "Tver Ethnocultural Association–Tverzha" (Тверское Этнокультурное Объединение "Твержа");
- "Union of Slavic Communities of the Slavic Native Belief" (Союз Славянских Общин Славянской Родной Веры):
  - "Krasnoyarsk Rodnover Communities–Rodunitsa" (Общины Родноверов Красноярья "Родуница");
- "Wolves of the Don" of Volgograd;
- "Wolves of Khors" of Nizhni Novgorod;
- "Ancient Russian Ynglist Church of the Orthodox Old Believers–Ynglings" (Древнерусская Инглиистическая Церковь Православных Староверов–Инглингов), mother church of Ynglism;
  - Pankov Ynglism, in Altay.

=== Serbia ===
- Association of Rodnovers of Serbia "Staroslavci" (Удружење Родноверних Србије "Старославци").

=== Slovakia ===
- "Holy Grove of the Native Faith" (Svätoháj Rodnej Viery);
- Civic Association "Tartaria" (Ynglism).

=== Slovenia ===
- "Old Believers" Association (Združenje "Staroverci");
- "Svetovid Parish of the Old Belief" (Staroverska Župa Svetovid).

=== Ukraine ===
As of 2016, the Ukrainian state officially recognises only four of the following organisations (RUNVira, Ancestral Fire of the Native Orthodox Faith, the Churches of Ukrainian Gentiles and the Federation of Ukrainian Rodnovers), with more than one hundred local congregations affiliated with these four. In addition, the state recognises more than thirty other congregations which are not affiliated with the four recognised organisations.

- "Ancestral Fire of the Native Orthodox Faith" (Родового Вогнища Рідної Православної Віри);
- "Ancestral Fire of the Slavic Native Faith" (Родове Вогнище Слов'янської Рідної Віри);
- "Brotherhood of Ukrainian Gentiles–Svarha";
- "Churches of Ukrainian Gentiles" (Церкви Українських Язичників);
- "Circle of Ukrainian Rodnovers" (Коло Родноверов Украины);
- "Federation of Ukrainian Rodnovers" (Объединение Родноверов Украины) of Halyna Lozko (Volkhvynia Zoreslava).
- "Great Fire" movement" (Великий Огонь);
- "Khara-Khors Slavic Vedic" movement;
- "Order of the Knights of the Solar God";
- Ladovery (Ладовіра) of Oleksandr Shokalo;
- "Native Orthodox Faith–Wreath of God";
- Native Ukrainian National Faith, Sylenkoite churches:
  - "Association of Sons and Daughters of Ukraine of the Native Ukrainian National Faith" (Об'єднання Синів і Дочок України–РУНВіра; OSIDU RUNVira);
  - "Association of Sons and Daughters of the Native Ukrainian National Faith" (Об'єднання Синів і Дочок–РУНВіра; OSID RUNVira);
  - "Union of the Ukrainian Native Faith" (Собор Родной Украинской Веры);
  - Volodymyr Chornyi's following;
- "North Caucasian Scythian Regional Fire" (Assian organisation in the North Caucasus region of Russia and east Ukraine);
- Orantism (Орантизм), Berehynia devotees;
- "Perun's Host" (Perunova Rat) organisation;
- "Academy of Human Development–Rodosvit";
- "Ruthenian Orthodox Circle" (Русский Православный Круг);
- "Centre for the Revival of Ukrainian Culture–Svitovyd";
- "Trinity" (Triitsia) organisation, of Ievhen Dobzhansky (Voleliub);
- "Ukrainian Spiritual Republic" (Ukrainska Dukhovna Respublika) of Oles Berdnyk;
- Union of Ukrainian Customary Communities.

== Non-Slavic countries ==
=== Australia ===
- Native Ukrainian National Faith (RUNVira) congregations/churches
- "Southern Cross Rodnovery".

=== Canada ===
- Native Ukrainian National Faith (RUNVira) congregations/churches.

=== Estonia ===
- "Fellowship of the Russian Folk Faith in Estonia" (Содруга Русской Народной Веры в Эстонии).

=== United States ===
- Native Ukrainian National Faith (RUNVira) congregations/churches.
