= Slavic Native Faith in Ukraine =

The Slavic Native Faith in Ukraine has an unspecified number of adherents which ranges between the thousands and the tens of thousands.

== History ==
Volodymyr Shaian (1908–1974), a linguist, philologist and Orientalist-Sanskritologist, was a pioneer of Slavic Native Faith (Rodnovery) in Ukraine during the interwar period. At an Indologist seminar in Lviv in 1937, Shaian presented his neopagan vision of a "pan-Aryan renaissance".

A movement within Rodnovery which is unique to Ukraine is the Native Ukrainian National Faith, established by Lev Sylenko in the 1960s among the Ukrainian diaspora in North America, and introduced in Ukraine only in the 1990s.

== Demographics ==
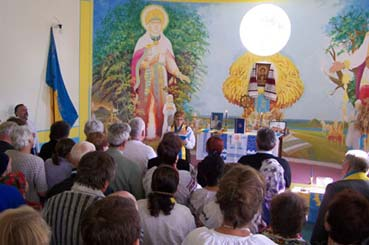
People gathered for worship at a Native Ukrainian National Faith's temple in Ukraine

In 2005, Ivakhiv noted that there were likely between 5000 and 10,000 Rodnovers in Ukraine. He also observed that it had undergone dramatic growth in the country since the early and mid 1990s. Other sociologists estimated that in the same years Ukrainian Rodnovers were more than 90,000 (0.2% of the total population).

Ivakhiv noted that the average age of Ukrainian Rodovers was older than the average age of Pagans in the West, and also noted that the religion's "main base" was "nationally oriented ethnic Ukrainians of higher-than-average educational levels". He observed that there was overlap between the Rodnover communities and other sectors of Ukrainian society, such as the folk and traditional music revival groups, Cossack associations, traditional martial arts groups, and nationalist and ultra-nationalist organisations. He added that Rodnovery remains "a relatively small niche in Ukrainian religious culture", and that it faces a mixed reception in the country. Established Ukrainian Orthodox and Roman Catholic groups have viewed Slavic Native Faith with alarm and hostility, while the country's educated and intellectual classes tend to view it as a fringe part of the ultra-conservative movement which was tinged with anti-Semitism and xenophobia.

In the global Ukrainian diaspora, there has been a "great decline" in the numbers practising the Native Ukrainian National Faith branch of Rodnovery. This has been due to the branch's inability to attract sufficient numbers of youth in this community. Alternately, the Ukrainian organisation Ancestral Fire of the Native Orthodox Faith has established groups in both Moldova and Germany. In Ukraine, much like in Russia, Rodnovery is very popular among Cossacks, and the variety that they embrace, Assianism, is linked to a rediscovery of Scythian identity. Pilkington and Popov report one Russian Cossack saying that in Ukraine it is easier to meet Rodnover Cossacks than Christian Cossacks.

== Ukrainian and Russian Rodnovers' involvement in the war in Donbas ==
Rodnovery has a significant role in the war in Donbas, with many Rodnovers forming or joining armed forces. Some of them—for example those of the Svarozich Battalion—have been fighting in favour of Russia; other Rodnovers—such as those of the Azov Battalion—have taken the side of Ukraine. The war has stirred different reactions among Rodnovers in Ukraine; those belonging to the Native Ukrainian National Faith viewed Russia as the aggressor, while adherents of other Rodnover organisations like the Ancestral Fire of the Native Orthodox Faith more commonly saw Russians and Ukrainians as brothers and believed that the conflict was caused by the machinations of the United States.

Russian Rodnover military formations in Donbas include the Svarog, Varyag and Rusich formations, and Rodnovers within the Russian Orthodox Army. Observers have highlighted that Russian Rodnovers have been proselytising in the region, with the endorsement of Russia, under the name "Orthodoxy" and preaching the concept of a new "Russian World", and that their beliefs have even permeated the Orthodox Christian church.

== Rodnover organisations in Ukraine ==
As of 2016, the Ukrainian government granted official recognition only to four Rodnover organisations, among tens of them, and to more than thirty other congregations not affiliated with the four. The four Rodnover organisations with official registration as religious entities are the following ones:

- Ancestral Fire of the Native Orthodox Faith (Родового Вогнища Рідної Православної Віри);
- Churches of the Ukrainian Gentiles (Церкви Українських Язичників);
- Federation of Ukrainian Rodnovers (Объединение Родноверов Украины) led by Halyna Lozko (Volkhvynia Zoreslava);
- Native Ukrainian National Faith's main body.

== See also ==
- Slavic Native Faith in Poland
- Slavic Native Faith in Russia
