= Ecomedia =

Nonprint media and natural environment related studies

Ecomedia is a field of study that deals with the relationship between non-print media and the natural environment. Generally, this is divided into two domains: cultural representations of the environment in media and environmental impact of media forms.

The first domain, the environment in media, is very broad and can potentially include any form of media that deals with an environmental issue. The second domain, environmental impacts and concerns of media, focuses on the environmental impacts at every level production of media projects and seeks to make media as sustainable as possible

Eco Media bridges an appreciation for nature and preserving it, raising awareness on the importance of taking care of our environment and how we can do that in our new digital age.

== History ==
The field of ecomedia is still developing and remains mainly an academic discourse. It can be considered a subgroup of media studies, and it crosses the bounds of traditionally "single media" disciplines like literature, art history, and music.

The website EcomediaStudies.org was created in 2009 by Steve Rust and Salma Monani as a forum to generate conversation about ecomedia and to make a space for people writing about ecomedia to publish their work. The website's creators sketch the history of their field as developing out of "the 2009 Association for the Study of Literature and Environment (ASLE) conference in Victoria, British Columbia" which featured a special session and several panels on Ecological Media. Although the website has since been shut down, due to the creators wanting to focus on promoting the study of ecomedia, the website is still up and holds a significant amount of information about ecomedia and its development.

In 2015 Rust and Monani, along with Sean Cubitt, edited and published Ecomedia: Key Issues (Key Issues in Environment and Sustainability), a book that outlines the important factors at stake in ecomedia studies by looking from various theoretical perspectives at the interactions of environmental issues and media. The text covers multiple types of media with chapters on photography, cinema, newspaper strips, radio, television, mapping systems, advertising, and video games.

Since then, two peer-reviewed journals have emerged in the field of ecomedia studies: the open-access Media+Environment, edited by Alenda Chang, Adrian Ivakhiv, and Janet Walker, and published by the University of California Press, and the Journal of Environmental Media, edited by Hunter Vaughan and published by Intellect. Both emerged from a week-long 2017 workshop led by Ivakhiv, Vaughan, Walker, and Jim Schwoch, at the Rachel Carson Center in Munich.

In 2023 The Routledge Handbook of Ecomedia Studies was released as a peer-reviewed work made by Antonio Lopez, Adrian Ivakhiv as well as Stephen Rust. The work establishes Ecomedia's definition, Eco-culture, eco-materiality, and eco-effects .

In Testing the Effectiveness of an Ecomedia Literacy Environmental Education Lesson, Ludovica et al concludes that more research should be done to increase environmental, or Ecomedia literacy.

== Eco-cultures ==
Eco-cultures are the relationship between a work of media shaped by society and the culture or customs behind it. This relationship can be seen in the content of any given form of media and the cultural context surrounding the production of such content. Eco-cultural identity is a scientific lens used for the purpose of "understanding ecological and more-than-human elements of identities as they relate to and are shaped by sociocultural elements".

== Environment Through Media ==
Ecomedia can be a tool for understanding how environmental issues appear and evolve in culture through the study of both traditional and new media. Cultural ideas about the environment can manifest in film, television, music, visual arts, and video games. Ecomedia often aims to promote a dialogue surrounding themes of environmental topics.

=== Film and television ===
Digital media offers numerous outlets to share different perspectives on the environment. Within the realm of film and television, there are numerous approaches that exist. The subcategory of television is made up of news broadcasting, entertainment and educational television shows, advertisements, short films, and more. Each has different motives behind their approach of the topic, which also varies between cultures, environments, societies and political structures. There are channels dedicated to providing educational knowledge about the environment and human interactions with the environment, such as National Geographic. There are also television shows that are meant to provide education knowledge about the environment to children in a cartoon format. All of these forms of television are useful for answering the question of how environmental topics are portraying through media sources and what their intentions are. There have been numerous studies that look at whether or not this is a successful and educational way to promote environmental awareness.

The category of environmental films has similar opportunities for creative approaches to address the topic of the environment. Aside from the published media, celebrity status can led a voice to the environmental movement. The well-known actor and environmentalist, Leonardo Dicaprio, has both been featured in and been the director of environmental focused films. The idea that celebrity status can give attention to both good and bad aspects of the environment and its conservation is a growing trend for environmentalism as well as other global topics. The argument that individuals, such as celebrities are becoming a part of the spectacle of conservation, driven by the consumerist aspect of media.

The overarching media forms of film and television can address the environment through undertones and hidden messages, using it to create plot, or coverage of an existing or past environmental concern.

However, environmental problems rarely appear in popular films. A study of 250 of the most-watched fictional films released between 2013 and 2022 found that climate change existed in 12.8% of these films, while a global environmental problem (climate change, freshwater pollution, marine pollution, air pollution, deforestation, species extinction and biodiversity decline, or toxic waste) existed in 26%. The presence of climate change, as well as common climate impacts, increased substantially over time; however, when climate change and other environmental problems were present, they were generally mentioned in just one or two scenes, and their gravity and/or urgency was not emphasized.

=== Music ===
Similarly, musicians have participated in the call to action of the environmental movement. Artists have utilized their fame to publicize issues of environmental crisis through their lyrics. Iconic examples such as Joni Mitchell's "Big Yellow Taxi" and Marvin Gaye's "Mercy Mercy Me" have narrated reactions to the rising environmental movement. Lyrical representations of environmental crises serve to bring them to mainstream attention.

For examples see: List of songs about the environment

=== Visual Arts ===
Artistic representations of environmental crises have increasingly been represented in contemporary art. Environmentally focused visual art has acted as both a reaction and stimulus to action regarding environmental crises. Environmental art is a recent development, only developing in the late 1960s. The pieces can serve as both visual pleasure and also political statements. Often, artists are starting to use recycled materials to convey their message while aiming to share their ideas in practice by using trash materials and making them into pieces of beauty.

For examples see: Environmental Art

=== Video games ===
Another approach to raising environmental consciousness in media aims to target a younger generation of consumers through video games. Video game publishers are releasing games that offer lessons about human impact on the environment, eco systems, and solutions to climate change through building sustainable communities. Some research suggests that video games could be an effective tool for teaching environmental ethics.

== Media as Environment ==
Also known as Ecomateriality, this approach to ecomedia focuses on examining the physical impact that our media practices have on the environment, concerning our use of natural resources in creating and distributing different forms of media. Ecomedia acts as a form of environmental critique through extended engagement with "the production, distribution, consumption, and cultural afterlife of particular media genres and works". It seeks to reform the way in which we use natural resources to promote safer and more environmentally-friendly practices.

This approach to ecomedia focuses on examining the physical impact that our media practices have on the environment, concerning our use of natural resources in creating and distributing different forms of media. Ecomedia acts as a form of environmental critique through extended engagement with "the production, distribution, consumption, and cultural afterlife of particular media genres and works". It seeks to reform the way in which we use natural resources to promote safer and more environmentally-friendly practices.

=== Examples ===
==== E-Waste ====
E-waste can be broadly defined as business and consumer electronic equipment that is at or nearing the end of its functioning life. It can include cellular devices, computers, televisions, printers, microwaves, copiers, stereos, and other common electronic items. According to the US Environmental Protection Agency, only 12.5% of electronic waste is recycled in the US. Additionally, the volume of global e-waste is projected to grow to 65 million tons by the end of 2017, an increase of 33% of its current volume. Many components of e-waste can be recycled or reused in some way, prompting the creation of a number of ecomedia measures to address this issue.

==== Wastefulness of Storing Electronic Media ====
There are around 12 million servers driving approximately 3 million data centers. Energy waste is a major problem regarding the media stored in these data centers. According to a study by NRDC, most electricity waste is from smaller-size data centers. Currently, the electricity usage is around 91 billion kilowatt-hours which equals the power generation of 34 coal-fired power plants. Additionally, the rising electronic media demands will increase electricity consumption to around 140 billion kilowatt hours a year. Worsening this situation is that most of the 12 million servers within the United States are idle. This means that they are consuming electricity without performing useful work.

==== E-Cycling ====
Electronics recycling, or e-cycling, is the practice of finding other means to dispose of electronics besides regular trash services.

===== Reasons to E-Cycle =====
E-cycling provides a means to remedy the physical waste problems surrounding much of ecomedia. Ecomedia waste requires intensive mining and manufacturing practices, which has a substantial impact on the natural land area around those sites. Practicing eco-cycling can prevent increased mining for ecomedia resources, as many recycling programs do actually reuse the materials from older products. Additionally, many of the products contain hazardous materials. Batteries, television components and even smartphones can cause damage to the natural environment if they are allowed to sit in a landfill. E-cycling facilities are able to handle this waste appropriately.

===== Public =====
Many local government agencies enforce restrictions on what ecomedia waste is allowed to be disposed of in the general trash, because of its hazardous nature. Products such as computer components, laptops and tablets, televisions and DVD players are restricted from regular trash. Additionally, many municipalities will offer special collection dates and times for electronic waste or require residents to schedule a special pickup for those items.

===== Private =====
Private companies also offer programs to recycle and reuse discarded electronics. Similar to the public option, many private companies will accept on-location drop-offs of computer parts or cell phones. Not every company will accept every type of electronic waste product, and some may charge a small fee.

===== Apple =====
Apple has implemented a complementary reuse and recycle service that allows users to exchange computers, iPads, and iPhones for store credit if the device qualifies for reuse. If the device does not meet the criteria for reuse, Apple will recycle it at no cost to the consumer.

The company partners with Li Tong Group, a Hong Kong electronics recycler which breaks down every component of the old phone and captures 100% of the chemicals and gas emissions that are created during the process.
