= Native Ukrainian National Faith =

Ukrainian Rodnover movement founded by Lev Sylenko, based on the book "Maha Vira"

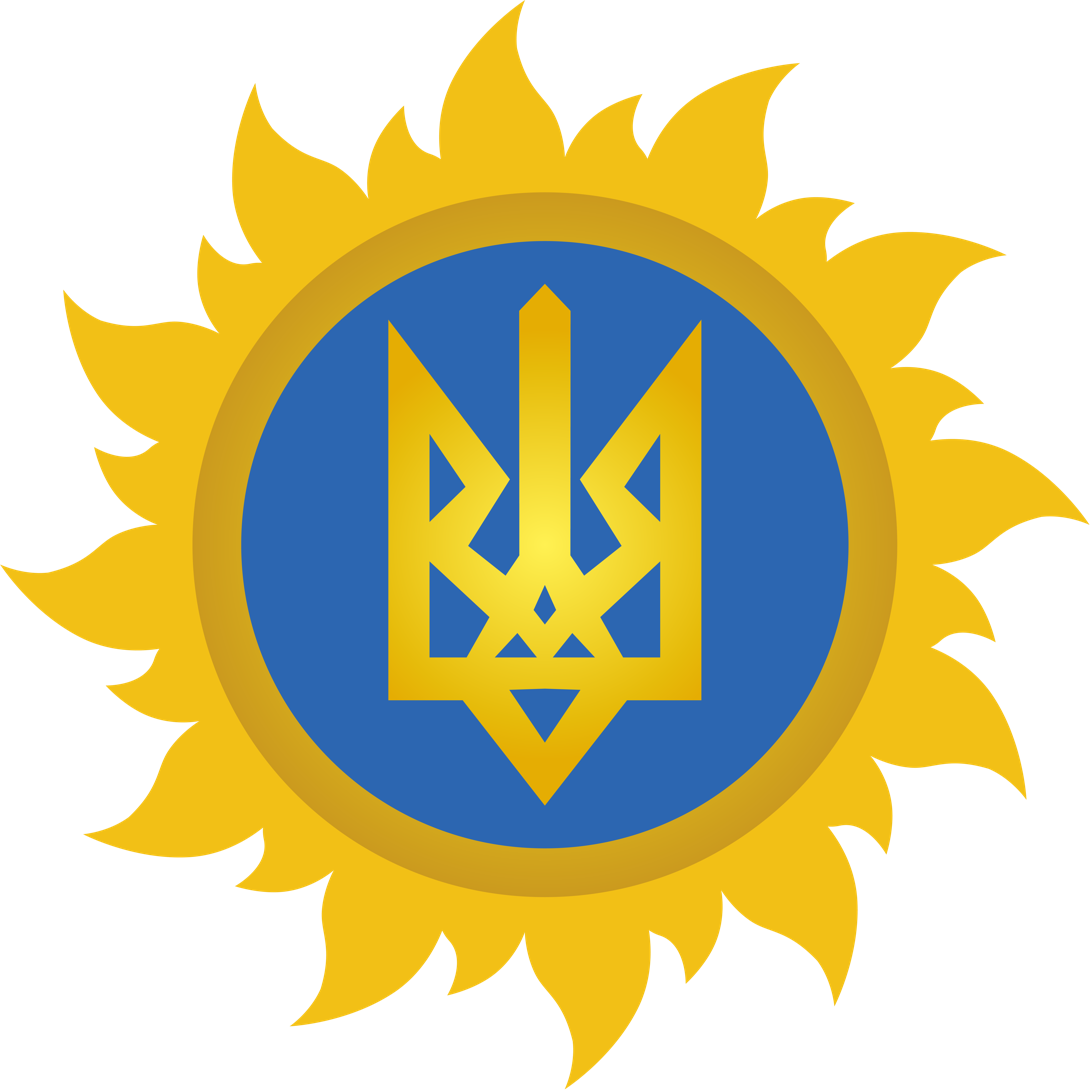
The symbol of RUNVira, a trysuttia, representing Prav, Yav and Nav, encircled by the Sun, that is the visible Dazhboh

The Native Ukrainian National Faith (Ukrainian: Рі́дна Украї́нська Націона́льна Ві́ра, Rídna Ukrayíns'ka Natsionál'na Víra; widely known by the acronym РУНВі́ра, RUNVira), also called Sylenkoism (Силенкоїзм) or Sylenkianism (Силенкіянство), and institutionally also known as the Church of Ukrainian Native Faith or Church of the Faithful of the Native Ukrainian National Faith, (Note: The name "Church of Ukrainian Native Faith" is shared by both RUNVira and the non-Sylenkoite Rodnover organisation established by the followers of Volodymyr Shaian in Canada in 1981, led by Shaian's disciple Myroslav Sytnyk, which later gave rise in Ukraine to Halyna Lozko's Federation of Ukrainian Rodnovers. Sytnyk was also originally connected with RUNVira.) is a branch of Rodnovery (Slavic Native Faith) specifically linked to the Ukrainians that was founded in the mid 1960s by Lev Sylenko (1921–2008) among the Ukrainian diaspora in North America, and first introduced in Ukraine in 1991. Sylenkoite communities are also present in Russia and Belarus, as well as in Western Europe and Oceania. The doctrine of this tradition is codified into a sacred book composed by Sylenko himself, the Maha Vira ("Great Faith"). Sylenkoite theology is characterised by a solar monotheism.

== Overview ==
Lev Sylenko (1921–2008) was a disciple of the earliest ideologue of Ukrainian Rodnovery, Volodymyr Shaian (1908–1974), and was a member of the religio-political anti-Soviet "Order of the Knights of the Sun God" (Orden Lytsariv Boha Sontsia) founded by the same Shaian in the 1940s. Sylenko was initiated into the group with the name Orlyhora ("Eagle Mountain"). In the 1940s, Sylenko emigrated to Canada, and then to the United States, where in the 1960s he founded the Native Ukrainian National Faith. By the 1970s, Shaian and Sylenko had parted and taken two different paths, as Sylenko had begun to elaborate a systematised doctrine of Rodnovery which was rejected by Shaian. After travels in Europe and Asia, Sylenko compiled the Maha Vira, the holy book of his doctrine, and published it in 1979. The Maha Vira was preceded in 1969 by the poem The Mage's Gate, in which Sylenko outlined in a nutshell the foundations of the doctrine.

The scholar Adrian Ivakhiv defined Sylenkoism as a "reformed" Rodnovery, a "comprehensive and systematic attempt to create an intellectually coherent synthetic new religion" based on Slavic heritage with elements of Theosophy, deism and messianism. The scholar Victor Shnirelman defined Sylenkoism as a monotheism based on Slavic heritage, and as such he compared it to the later "Russian Religion" developed in Russia by Viktor M. Kandyba. Due to its monotheism and its early emphasis on the charismatic figure of the founder, Sylenkoism has been deemed by other Ukrainian Rodnover movements as a not authentically "native" religion. Members of Sylenkoite churches, however, consider themselves Rodnovers in all respects. Halyna Lozko, the leader of the Federation of Ukrainian Rodnovers, which continues Volodymyr Shaian's orthodoxy, advanced vehement critiques of Sylenkoism, calling Lev Sylenko a "false prophet" and accusing him of having tried to lead the Ukrainians into the Abrahamic religions' "quagmire of cosmopolitan monotheism". Lozko criticised Sylenko for "cancelling the ancestral gods, proclaiming absolute monotheism, and [...] attaching his own characteristics to [...] God". Despite this, Lev Sylenko himself rejected the Abrahamisms, and Christianity in particular, deeming the latter a "nomadic Judaism".

== Beliefs ==
=== Historiosophy of the Maha Vira ===
The Maha Vira (literally "Great Faith") is the holy writing used within the organisations of the Sylenkoite movement, published in 1979 and consisting in 1,427 pages. Its title blends the Sanskrit term maha, "great", and the Ukrainian term vira, "faith". It was composed by Lev Sylenko himself as a synthesis of philosophical ideas relying upon historical and archaeological sources, presenting a historiosophical account of eleven thousand years, intertwined with theological and cosmological doctrines, and a prophetic message for the future. The book includes a comparative lexicon of Sanskrit, Ukrainian and English language.

The book tells the history of "Oriiana" or "Orania", identified as the Cucuteni–Trypillia culture (3000–5000 BCE), assumed to have been the epicentre of the Indo-Europeans or Aryans, whom the book calls "Oriians", evoking a connection with the Ukrainian word for "plowing", oraty. The progenitors of the Oriians, and therefore of Ukrainians, are Father Or (Орь) and Mother Lel (Лель), who are frequently depicted in RUNVira shrines and temples. Or is also called Orii (Орій) or Arii (Арій), Orya (Оря), and Yari or Yuri, and identified as the solar deity Yarilo, while Lel is also known as Lelii (Лелій) and Lelya (Леля).

According to the book, the Oriians are the original progenitors of the white race, and the earliest European civilisation—corresponding to, or preceding, the Cucuteni-Trypillia complex—developed along the banks of the Dnieper. From the Oriians descended the Scythians, the Russians and the Ukrainians. The Ukrainians are regarded as the most direct descendants of the Oriians, and therefore as superior to all Europeans. Kyiv is described as the "most ancient city" of the white race. The Oriians are described in the book as the carriers of the philosophy later written down in the Vedas, developed as the Oriians migrated in different directions including the north of the Indian subcontinent.

The Maha Vira is described by Ivakhiv as a "systematic intellectual construct" grounded on the premise of Ukrainian ethnocultural primordialism or essentialism. The book explains that during its evolution, the human species has divided itself into many distinct ethnocultural groups, ethne or ethnoi (singular ethnos, the Greek word for "ethnicity"), each of which undergoes its life cycle, flourishing and perishing according to its own development. Sylenko argues that without such division, the human species would be too fragile, as the division allows for a diversity of experiments, some successful and some others not, allowing for a continuation of evolution. The formation of an ethnos is always accompanied by the systematisation of originally unorganised beliefs into a coherent religious doctrine, representing a shared system of ideas unifying the ethnos; the Maha Vira intends to represent such systematisation for the Ukrainians.

=== Theology and cosmology ===
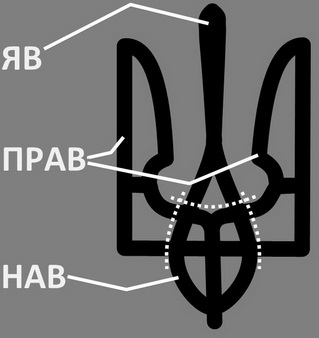
The tryzub or trysuttia as a representation of the theo-cosmology of Ukrainian Sylenkoism

According to the definition given by Sylenko himself, his doctrine is that of a solar "absolute monotheism". Sylenko proclaimed himself a prophet, bringing to the Slavs a new understanding of God that, according to him, corresponds to their own and original understanding of God. The Sylenkoites believe that he acquired this knowledge through the "breath of his ancestors" in his soul, being united with them "by divine holiness". (Note: The scholar Mariya Lesiv noted the similarity between the foundation narratives of Sylenkoism and Christianity, at the same time emphasising the difference that while Jesus was born of the Holy Spirit, Sylenko was born of the love of his ancestors.) According to Sylenko's own words:

I was born out of their [the ancestors'] love. And this is why I love everything that is my own so devotedly and tenderly as they loved it. Their blood flows in my blood. Their souls live in my soul. They are my love. [...] God's grace came upon me, and following the will of God I have proclaimed a new understanding of God.

— Lev Sylenko, The Wisdom of Ukrainian Truth: A Catechism

Sylenkoite theology may be further defined as pantheistic or panentheistic. In the Maha Vira, the supreme God, identifying himself as Dazhboh (Дажбог)—meaning "Giving God" or "Sun God" in the ancient Slavic tradition—proclaims through his prophet Lev Sylenko:

I am Dazhboh, I am in all things and all things are in me.

Dazhboh is described as the life-giving energy of the cosmos; in Sylenko's own words it is "light, endlessness, gravitation, eternity, movement, action, the energy of unconscious and conscious being". Sylenkoite cosmology conceives Dazhboh as containing the three worlds, Prav, Yav and Nav. As in broader Rodnovery, Prav is considered the right law of nature, Yav is the visible, manifested world, while Nav is the invisible, spiritual world.

Sylenko is seen by his followers as making the same operation that Axial Age thinkers made, in other parts of the world and among other peoples, by moving away from polytheism and affirming the concept of single God. (Note: Within the religion, Lev Sylenko is compared to the philosophers, prophets and religious reformers of the Axial Age: Zarathustra, Confucius, Buddha and Muhammad.) Sylenkoite doctrine emphasises, in evolutionary terms, that monotheism is a higher level of spiritual development than polytheism, and the latter should be rejected, since, by the words of Sylenko's writings: "Dazhboh [...] has no need of any ambassadors in the form of higher or lower deities". Sylenko was profoundly influenced by the discourse about a European superiority communicated through the concept of monotheism, and he envisioned the Ukrainians as the superior people who will extend to all Europeans his operation of spiritual progress, spreading the "European understanding of God", implying a reformulation of local European ethnic polytheistic religions into Sylenkoite monotheism. In Sylenko's own words:

Humanity languishes in the darkness: it is absolutely necessary to feed its brain with new food. Ukraine is called by the Heavens to show Europe the new way [of spiritual development].

— Lev Sylenko, A Guest from the Temple of Ancestors

Despite their monotheism, some Sylenkoites take part in initiatives of non-Sylenkoite Rodnovers involving polytheistic worship, or listen to the music of Zhyvosyl Liutyi dedicated to multiple deities.

== Practices ==
=== Priesthood ===
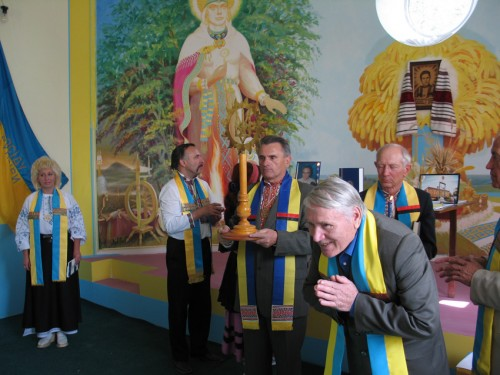
Five Sylenkoite tatos and a mama distinguished by wearing blue and yellow sviadanas

Sylenkoite communities are led by male and female priests, respectively called RUNtatos ("Native Ukrainian National fathers") and RUNmamas ("Native Ukrainian National mothers"). Not all the branches of Sylenkoism use the terms tato and mama to refer to the clergy; notably, OSID RUNVira, a branch of the original RUNVira church that further reworked Sylenko's original teachings, uses simply the term "priests". Male priests significantly outnumber their female counterparts. When Lev Sylenko was alive, until 2008, ordinations were conferred by him himself, as a candidate had to make an application to him supported by letters of recommendation from the same candidate's religious community.

Sylenkoite priests are expected to teach the congregation how to apply the religion's tenets in everyday life, and to give advice to the congregation's members on various matters regarding personal and social life. A good priest is required to show loyalty towards the religious doctrines, and to have some specific personality traits: he should be self-controlled, he should speak softly, and behave in a noble way; he should never judge, accuse or intimidate anybody, and he should never show anger. Priests are distinguished by wearing a sviadana, that is to say a long narrow ribbon made of blue and yellow fabric, with black and red horizontal bands, draped around the neck. Male priests wear embroidered shirts, usually combined with European suits.

=== Rites and holidays ===
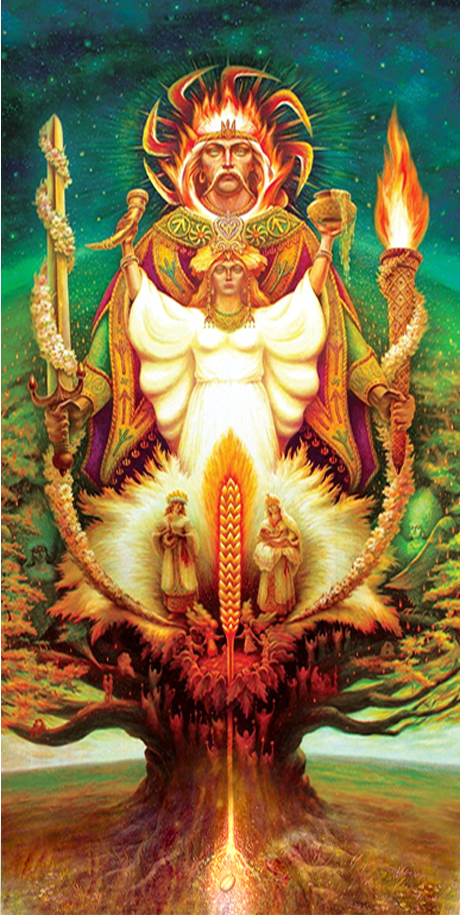
Painting representing the tree of life, by the painter Viktor Kryzhanivskyi (1950–2016) very appreciated by Sylenkoites

The Maha Vira contains descriptions of rituals and holidays, and a calendar which begins its chronology eleven thousand years ago, when the Paleolithic culture of Mezine reached its apogee. Many of the rituals and holidays described in the book are derived from Ukrainian village folklore, interpreted and adjusted by Sylenko himself, while others are newly created. A detailed description of Sylenkoite practices is also given in Sylenko's Sacred Book of Rituals, which was first published in the United States.

The holidays comprise the Great Day of Dazhboh's Light on 14 April, corresponding to the celebration of Easter in Ukrainian villages. Other holidays are dedicated to important figures of Ukrainian history, including Sviatoslav I (935–972), the last traditional religious prince of Kievan Rus' and a great warrior who expanded the borders of his country, and Taras Shevchenko (1814–1861), whom Sylenko regarded as a critic of Christianity and promoter of the ancestral faith. Other Sylenkoite holidays are dedicated to contemporary social and environmental issues, including the Day of Animal Protection on 28 April, and the Day of the People's Anger on 5 November, a day dedicated to indignation towards intruders and oppressors of the Ukrainian nation. 27 September is the Day of the Holy Maha Vira and the birthday of the "Native Prophet", Lev Sylenko.

Sylenkoite lifecycle rituals include the blessing of a newborn child, marriages, funerals, and the commemoration of the dead. Every new convert to the religion is also required to choose a native Slavic name, and goes through a ritual of name-giving or renaming. The latter is especially needed when the convert has a "foreign" given name, and even more so when such name is associated with Christianity. A weekly worship ceremony held on Sunday, called the Holy Hour of Self-Reflection, constitutes the main setting for most rites. Although Sylenko allows some flexibility in the ritual practice, he insists that the Maha Vira should be the main source for their preparation. The priest is supposed to choose lectures from the Maha Vira pertaining to the theme of the weekly Holy Hour; for example, on the Day of Taras Shevchenko the priest reads the passages of the book dedicated to Shevchenko's life and legacy, while on folk holidays the priest reads those passages of the book that describe how a particular holiday was celebrated in the past and how it should be observed today.

Despite Sylenko's efforts to establish a unified liturgy, later leaders and branches of the movement approached his teaching selectively. For instance, OSID RUNVira practises a Service of Honouring God (Nabozhenstvo), elaborated by Bohdan Ostrovskyi, that only vaguely resembles the Holy Hour of Self-Reflection, not containing much reading from the Maha Vira and focusing instead on colourful ritual action and singing. OSID RUNVira also recognises the holiday of Kupala Night as part of the Sylenkoite calendar, and celebrates it through a complex ritual recreated by the same Ostrovskyi. At the 2008 Triennial RUNVira Council held in Bohoyavlensky, Mykolaiv, one of the major issues addressed by the delegates was the growing diversification and inconsistency among the rituals performed by different Sylenkoite congregations across Ukraine, as different leaders were introducing too many innovations in their congregations' liturgy; most of the delegates agreed that standardisation was important and they called for a more strict following of Sylenko's liturgy book.

Like other Rodnovers, especially Cossack sorcerers, many Sylenkoites practise martial arts. The most widely known figure of Ukrainian martial arts in the 2010s is the Sylenkoite follower Volodymyr Pylat , the founder and teacher of Combat Hopak, a martial form of the traditional Cossack dance of hopak combined with a philosophical worldview. Before turning to Slavic martial arts, Pylat was a sensei in Kyokushin Karate and he studied other Eastern martial arts styles. His school is located in Lviv, and his work is appreciated both by Sylenkoites and by other Rodnovers. The basic philosophical tenets of the practice are expressed by Pylat himself in the following terms:

Fighting for truth and against the forces of Darkness and Evil in the name of victory for Light, Goodness and Love—positive creative powers that facilitate the development of the Universe, the creation of the most perfect forms of life and the transformation of the physical into the spiritual.

=== Temples and altars ===
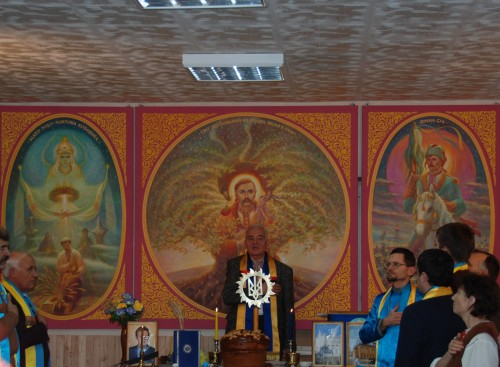
Sylenkoite priests holding a ceremony in a hall in Kyiv. At the centre of the scene there is an altar with the symbol of Dazhboh, a blue and a yellow candle, cups for soil and water, a portrait of Lev Sylenko, and a copy of the Maha Vira.

Sylenkoite ceremonies are usually held inside temples and in front of altars. Two important temples include the Temple of the Nativity of Lev Sylenko, located in Bohoyavlensky, Mykolaiv, the village in southern Ukraine where Lev Sylenko was born, and the Temple of Oriiana in Spring Glen, New York, in the United States. Stationary altars are located in temples or in people's homes, as domestic altars. They are set up on a table covered with four different embroidered cloths, of which the top and bottom pieces are decorated with meandering designs associated with the culture of Mezine. In the middle of the altar is located a portable symbol of Dazhboh, a mandatory attribute for all Sylenkoite services. There are also two figurines representing Or and Lel, two candles in candlesticks, a sviadana, flowers, a container for holy soil, and another one for holy water. According to the instructions of Sylenko, ears of wheat should be placed on the altar to symbolise the agricultural origins of the Ukrainians, the holy soil should be from the fields of Trypillia, and the holy water should be from the Dnieper.

The altars of OSID RUNVira, the branch of the movement which further elaborated Sylenko's ideas and does not recognise him as the ultimate prophet but as the main ideologist of the religion, do not display many references to Sylenko himself apart from the Maha Vira and the Sacred Book of Rituals. On the contrary, the altars of OSIDU RUNVira, the branch of the movement which recognises Sylenko as the ultimate prophet, apart from displaying the books, always also display a portrait of Sylenko himself whom is object of worship.

== Organisations ==
The early church of the Native Ukrainian National Faith was founded by Lev Sylenko in 1966, in the United States, among the Ukrainian diaspora. The first congregation was established in Chicago, and later congregations were founded in Canada, England, Germany, Australia and New Zealand. The headquarters of the church were set at the Temple of Oriiana, located in Spring Glen, New York, in the region of the Catskill Mountains. The Sylenkoite movement was introduced in Ukraine in the early 1990s. The first congregation was registered by the government in Kyiv in 1991, less than a month after the collapse of the Soviet Union. By the end of the decade the number of registered communities had grown to fifty and other tens were active throughout the country without formal registration. The movement also spread to Russia and Belarus.

During the 1980s, Sylenkoism split into at least four major branches, and many other communities led by several individual tatos, or male spiritual leaders. The contemporary four distinct Sylenkoite churches, which administer more than one hundred congregations spread throughout Ukraine, are: the "Association of Sons and Daughters of the Native Ukrainian National Faith" (OSID RUNVira), the "Association of Sons and Daughters of Ukraine of the Native Ukrainian National Faith" (OSIDU RUNVira), Volodymyr Chornyi's Lviv-based "western branch" of OSIDU RUNVira, and the "Union of Native Ukrainian Faith" (SRUV).

=== OSIDU RUNVira ===
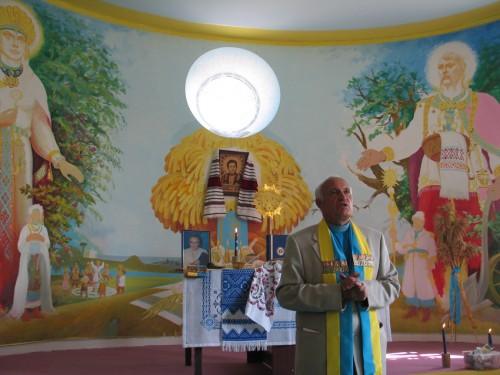
Sylenkoite priest preaching at the Temple of the Nativity of Lev Sylenko, of OSIDU RUNVira, located where Sylenko was born, in Bohoyavlensky, Mykolaiv, Ukraine. The background wall paintings representing Or and Lel were made by Viktor Kryzhanivskyi.

Among Sylenkoite organisations, the "Associations of Sons and Daughters of Ukraine of the Native Ukrainian National Faith" (ОСІДУ РУНВіра, OSIDU RUNVira) is that which has maintained direct relationship with Sylenko, fully accepting him as prophet. As of the mid-2000s the leader of the organisation was Bohdan Savchenko. The OSIDU Sylenkoites consider themselves a transformed and completed Rodnovery, focusing on the monotheistic belief in the impersonal Dazhboh, the energy of the cosmos.

Members of OSIDU RUNVira practise a weekly Holy Hour of Self-Reflection, which includes readings from the Maha Vira, sermons, commentaries, ancestor worship, prayers and hymns, and ends with the singing of Ukraine's national anthem. Liturgical elements for the ceremony include the symbol of Dazhboh, a jar with water from a holy river, a box containing soil from a holy ground, two candles, wheat ears, flowers (poppies and cornflowers), a sviadana, copies of the Maha Vira and the Sacred Book of Rituals, and a portrait of Lev Sylenko. OSIDU Sylenkoites are open to the celebration of holidays together with non-Sylenkoite Rodnovers, with traditional folk singing, bonfire jumping, circle and spiral dancing, burning or drowning the effigies of the deities Kupalo and Marena, and meeting the Sun's first rays the next morning. Some OSIDU Sylenkoite congregations also organise projects for the wider public; a community in Kharkiv, for instance, creates rai-sady ("paradise-gardens") and organises a regular festival dedicated to ecology and spirituality.

=== OSID RUNVira ===
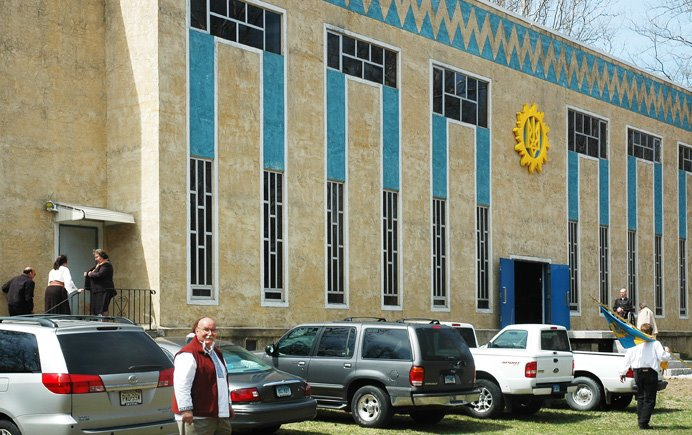
Temple of Oriiana, belonging to the OSID RUNVira, in Spring Glen, New York, United States

The "Association of Sons and Daughters of the Native Ukrainian National Faith" (ОСІД РУНВіра, OSID RUNVira) is the largest among Sylenkoite organisations. While recognising him as the founder of the movement, OSID RUNVira rejected Lev Sylenko's ultimate authority and sought a "more multilateral approach" to Rodnovery, remaining open to further developments independent from Sylenko. OSID RUNVira is currently led by a Holy Council presided by the folk musician Bohdan Ostrovskyi in Kyiv. Ostrovskyi was the founder of the first congregation of Sylenkoites in Ukraine in 1991. OSID RUNVira is the owner of the Temple of Oriiana in Spring Glen which the organisation took over by legal means in the late 1990s, after a dispute over the ownership with OSIDU RUNVira and especially with Lev Sylenko's secretary and confidante Tetiana Lysenko (Svitoslava).

Like OSIDU Sylenkoites, OSID Sylenkoites too celebrate weekly Holy Hours, but the OSID ritual is eclectic in incorporating non-Sylenkoite elements such as readings of the Book of Veles or of Taras Shevchenko's poetry. As an alternative to the Holy Hour, Ostrovskyi has also elaborated a Service of Honouring God (Nabozhenstvo), which puts less focus on the Maha Vira and emphasises ritual action and singing instead. OSID liturgy includes items like the didukh, that is a braided wheat sheaf, and an object representing fire besides water and earth, and besides all the other elements present in the shared Sylenkoite liturgy, like the symbol of Dazhboh, two candles, a sviadana, and copies of the Maha Vira and the Sacred Book of Rites. Ancestor worship is central to OSID Sylenkoism too, especially the celebration of heroes of Ukrainian and Slavic history, including the Oriians' supreme forefather Or and modern Ukrainian heroes, such as Taras Shevchenko, Ivan Franko, Bohdan Khmelnytsky, and Hryhory Skovoroda. However, compared to OSIDU RUNVira, OSID Sylenkoism puts more emphasis on traditional Slavic seasonal holidays in honour of the gods Kupala, Perun, Lada, and Dana. OSID RUNVira also notably uses de-Christianised names for some of its holidays—such as "Christmas of Dazhboh's Light" and "Easter of the Eternal Resurrection".

=== Union of Native Ukrainian Faith ===
The "Union of Native Ukrainian Faith" (Собор Рідної Української Віри, Sobor Ridnoyi Ukrayins'koyi Viry; SRUV) is another organisation of the Sylenkoite movement, more independent than the others from the original tradition, and more eclectic in its interpretation of the religion. It was founded in 1994 under the leadership of Oleh Bezverkhyi, author of several semi-scholarly pamphlets on Ukrainian Rodnovery and mysticism, raceology and related topics. The headquarters of SRUV Sylenkoism are in Vinnytsia. The SRUV has been more open than the other Sylenkoite organisations to an ecumenical movement of conciliation between Sylenkoites and non-Sylenkoite Rodnovers, taking part in the organisation of some pan-Rodnover viches.

Besides the Maha Vira of Lev Sylenko, SRUV Sylenkoism also relies upon the writings of Shaian, Shkavrytko, Kokriatskyi, Orion, Lisovyi and others. While retaining Sylenkoite monotheism, the SRUV promotes what it considers a more authentically Ukrainian theology with an emphasis on mysticism. SRUV Sylenkoites consider Podolia to be the heart of the ancient Oriian civilisation, being the place where remains of a large Scythian temple and the Zbruch Idol representing Svetovid were found, as well as the place where ancient Slavic religion was defended the longest and most strenuously by the Bolokhivsky princes, ostensibly as late as 1620.

== Symbolism ==
Sylenkoite symbolism relies much upon historical and contemporary Ukrainian national symbolism. The main symbol of Sylenkoism features the colours blue and yellow, and includes the tryzub (Ukrainian: тризуб), one of the historical symbols of the Rurikids which is featured on the modern coat of arms of Ukraine. The latter is called trysuttia in Sylenkoism, and is held to represent the three worlds Prav, Yav and Nav. The trident is encircled by a stylised Sun, symbol of Dazhboh. Sylenkoism also draws from the Paleolithic culture of Mezine for inspiration, and one of the most important symbols within the religion is the meander (an ornamental design winding in and out), considered related to Mezine and perceived as the most archaic form of ancestral spiritual expression.

== Sociology ==
=== Demographics ===
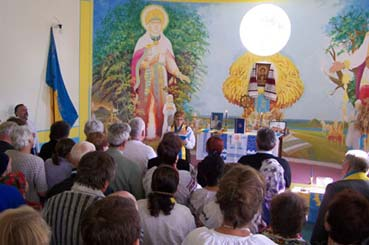
Communal worship of OSIDU Sylenkoites at the Temple of the Nativity of Lev Sylenko in Bohoyavlensky, Mykolaiv

Writing in 2005, the scholar Adrian Ivakhiv observed that, compared to broader Rodnovery, Sylenkoism tended to attract a more mature segment of society, namely people of around 40 years of age or older, although sometimes younger members took leadership functions. The adherents of the movement overlapped with folk and traditional music revival groups, traditional martial arts groups, with nationalist and ultra-nationalist political groups such as the Organisation of Ukrainian Nationalists and the Ukrainian National Assembly – Ukrainian People's Self-Defence (UNA-UNSO), with other cultural groups such as the National Writers' Union of Ukraine and the Traditional Association of Ukrainian Cossacks, a body founded in 2001 and having members in nineteen Ukrainian provinces. According to the scholar Alexey V. Gaidukov, in the 1990s the Sylenkoite doctrine was studied in university programs, and "the flower of the country's [Ukraine's] intelligentsia", including writers (Serhiy Plachynda, Anatoliy Kachan, Mykola Luhovyk) and artists, joined the church. Volodymyr Pylat, a leader of OSIDU RUNVira, was involved in the rebirth in western Ukraine of a martial art version of the hopak, a traditional Cossack dance.

Despite an original animosity between Sylenkoites and non-Sylenkoite Ukrainian Rodnovers, since the early 2000s there has been an increasing movement of ecumenical cooperation between the two factions. In 2003, forty-one delegates from communities across Ukraine and thirty-eight registered guests gathered in Kyiv at the First Forum of Ukrainian Rodnovers, presided by Iurii Shilov, Oleh Bezverkhyi of SRUV Sylenkoism, and Petro Ruban. A Second Forum of Ukrainian Rodnovers followed ten months later, attended by fifty-one delegates, forty-six participants and twenty-six other guests. SRUV Sylenkoism has been more open than both OSIDU RUNVira and OSID RUNVira to this ecumenical movement of Ukrainian Rodnovery. Many Rodnover groups in contemporary Ukraine rely upon the teachings of both Shaian and Sylenko.

=== Political ideas ===
The scholar Mariya Lesiv noted that Sylenkoism is "the most politically charged" among Ukrainian Rodnover streams, and that, differently from other Rodnovers who put more emphasis on the shared identity of the Slavic peoples, the Sylenkoites tend to emphasise the unique characteristics of the Ukrainians and especially their distinction from the Russians. Some Sylenkoites consider the Ukrainians to be the true descendants of the early medieval Russes and of Kievan Rus', while the modern Russians to be for the most part Russified Tatars of late medieval Muscovy (Muscovites). The latter are depicted in the Maha Vira as historic political enemies of the Ukrainians, and the religious calendar elaborated by Lev Sylenko includes a Day of the People's Anger meant to inspire indignation towards the oppression endured in the past by the Ukrainian people. Responding to both historical foreign oppression and the contemporary socio-political problems of Ukraine, some Sylenkoites have proposed projects to strengthen the identity of the Ukrainians; for instance, the Sylenkoite Bohdan Klymchak, from Lviv, a political prisoner during the Soviet Union, proposed the project of Oaza-Hora, a massive multilayered, terraced, mountain-like shrine of national awareness, dedicated to Ukrainian historical heroes and political prisoners of the Soviet regime.

Ivakhiv observed that many Sylenkoites, like other Rodnovers, espouse political ideas very similar to those of the European New Right, with a focus on "lifestyle, family, community, and ritual practice", as well as "pronounced ethic of honour, continuity with and responsibility before one's ancestors, and a land-based work ethic", and an opposition to the Western world led by the United States and their liberal values. Many Sylenkoites think that the Ukrainians are threatened by modern influences that by destroying traditional morality would be meant to "destroy the white population". In 2001, on the tenth anniversary of the independence of Ukraine, the periodical of RUNVira, Slovo Oriyiv, stated that "Today we've simply divided up our [former] total dependence on Moscow among Moscow, Washington, Israel, Europe, and God knows who else". Sylenkoism found support from various political parties in Ukraine, including the People's Democratic Party.

=== Relations with Christianity ===
Lev Sylenko described Christianity as a "nomadic Judaism" that was forcefully imposed on Kievan Rus' by Vladimir the Great (c. 958–1015). One of the goals of the Sylenkoite movement is specifically to "drive out [of Ukraine] the predatory Muscovite Christian Church" (the Russian Orthodox Church). Regarding the Christianisation of Kievan Rus', Sylenko commented:

One had to disown one's own, that which was sacred; to disown the holy things of one's ancestors, and 'with fear and trembling' to kneel and worship alien idols—icons depicting alien gods, brought from Greece.

— Lev Sylenko, The Wisdom of Ukrainian Truth: A Catechism

Christianity is seen as an external foreign force which attempts to destroy indigenous cultures by blending them into a global cultural pattern in order to play down ethnic differences and to indoctrinate its followers with a cosmopolitan attitude. According to Sylenko, Christianity leads to the development of a false consciousness in people:

Ukrainian children go to school [and] open their abc textbooks where Nazareth, not Kyiv, is given more space and attention. The teacher presents the first concepts to them: 'When the star of Bethlehem appears in the sky, little Jesus will come to visit children [...] and there will be Holy Supper and caroling in every house'. 'I am a little Ukrainian girl' and 'I am a little Ukrainian boy'—we glorify Nazareth, Bethlehem and the Jordan River. The first impressions of children's feelings, thoughts, and worries are devoted to non-Ukrainian holy things. Ukrainian children are happy that little Jesus is born; they become sad that he becomes crucified [and] then happy again that he is resurrected.

— Lev Sylenko, Maha Vira: Day 50

== See also ==
- New religious movement
- Rodnovery
  - Kandybaism
- Theosophy
