= Prav-Yav-Nav =

Three-part structure of the world in Slavic mythology

Prav (Правь), Yav (Явь) and Nav (Навь) are the three dimensions or qualities of the cosmos as described in the first chapter of the Book of Light and in the Book of Veles (a fabrication from the 19–20th century) of Slavic Native Faith (Rodnovery). Older sources mention only Nav and Yav concepts of ancient slavic cosmology, similar to Yin and Yang in Taoism, and Prav was not part of the concept. The literal meanings of the Prav, Yav, and Nav words, are, respectively, "Right", "actuality" and "probability". They are also symbolised as a unity by the god Triglav (the "Three-Headed One"). Already Ebbo (c. 775 – 20 March 851, who was archbishop of Reims) documented that the Triglav was seen as embodying the connection and mediation between Heaven, Earth and the underworld / humanity; these three dimensions were also respectively associated to the colours white, green and black as documented by Karel Jaromír Erben.

== History of the concept ==
Book of Veles, Tablet No. 1:

праве бо есь невідомо уложена дажьбом, а по ньяко пря же ся теце яве і та соутворі живо то нашо а токо лі одіде сьмртье есь явь есь текоуща а творено о праві наве нбо есте по тоія до те есте нава а по те есте нава а в праві же есте явъ

In the interpretation of the neopagan ideologue and popularizer of the Book of Veles, Alexander Asov (1992), this means:

For what is laid down by Dazhdbog in Prav, we do not know. And since this battle takes place in Yav, which creates our life, and if we leave, there will be death. Yav is the current, what is created by Prav. Nav is after it, and before it, there is Nav. And in Prav, there is Yav.

The publisher and probable falsifier of the Book of Veles, Yury Mirolyubov, interprets these terms as follows:

We managed only after long efforts to establish that "Yav" was reality, "Prav" - the truth, the laws that govern reality, and finally, "Nav" was the other world, where there was a "Yav" that was not connected with "Prav", and therefore incorporeal... The deceased came "from Nav, where no one vein comes veniti." Such communication with the dead takes place in Yav through Nav. Paradise, or the divine abode, where... Ancestors and Shuras ..., communicate with Yav through "Nav". This is, as it were, an intermediate step, because if we live in Yav, if Life itself, the outflow of Alive through time and space can only go on thanks to Prav - the basis that exists under it and established by the gods (the incarnations of Svarog), then in the future a person will "enter Nav," i.e., into the afterlife. Thus, there was no death, but only the contemplation of the "Nav sight" of those who left.

According to Slavic neopaganism, death as such does not exist. There is a state of afterlife, in which a person does not lose consciousness and waits for his reincarnation in Nav - parallels are drawn with ancient Hades. After bodily death, a person can remain in Yav as a guardian of a kind - chur or domovoy. They can go to the Veles Meadows in Nav, awaiting their fate, or be attributed to the gods and heroes in Iriy (Prav) and create the fate of other worlds. The world of Yav belongs to people, and they determine its fate.

From Mirolyubov, the idea of "Yav, Prav and Nav" was borrowed by one of the founders of Russian neopaganism, Valery Yemelyanov. In his book Dezionization (1979), he wrote that the "Veneti" constituted the "backbone" of the "Aryan" community and were the main guardians of the "general Aryan" ideology. The purity of language and ideology, according to Yemelyanov, was preserved only "in the vastness from Novgorod to the Black Sea", where the idea of "the trinity of three triune trinities" ("Prav-Yav-Nav", "Svarog-Perun-Svetovid") was preserved and reigned a golden age.

The neopagan writer Vladimir Shcherbakov believed that the formula "Yav, Nav, Prav" means the trinity of the world of people, spirits, and gods and was the basis of the Slavic pagan faith, which was the key to the invincibility of ancient ancestors.

Another writer close to neopaganism, Yuri Petukhov, also wrote about the triad of "Prav, Yav, Nav", borrowed from the Book of Veles.

"Yav-Prav-Nav" appears in the neopagan Concept of Public Security of Russia "Dead Water" (KOB) by Major General Konstantin Petrov (volkhv Meragor).

In the "Slavic-Aryan Vedas", the sacred scripture of Ynglism, a direction of Slavic neopaganism created by the Omsk esotericist Alexander Khinevich, a fourth component, "Slav" (Glory) is added to the native faith triad "Yav, Prav, Nav". Like Yemelyanov and Asov, several different "trinities" ("Great Triglavs of the Worlds") are constructed, the number of which reaches seven.

The neopagan ideologue Dmitry Gavrilov (Yggeld, the Bera Circle community) interprets the triad "Yav, Prav, and Nav" by Gavrilov without reference to the original source (Book of Veles) within the framework of Hegel's philosophy as thesis, synthesis, and antithesis. After the publication of Izvednik, Gavrilov admitted that the noun "Prav" is not found in reliable sources and is a lexical innovation. However, he expressed confidence that there was a "third component of the triad," but it had a different name.

== General meaning ==
Prav-Yav-Nav as seen in Ynglist cosmology though they also add a fourth concept Slav (Славь) which means "Glory". The four are said to represent the four dimensions of, and of the cycle of life throughout them.

Following the description in the Book of Veles, many modern practitioners of Slavic Native Faith describe Prav ("Right"; cf. Greek Orthotes, Sanskrit Ṛta) as being the universal order otherwise described as the "Law of Heaven", which is enacted by the supreme God (Род Rod, "Generation" itself in Slavic theology) and permeates and regulates the other two hypostases. It is conceived as being at the same time the plane of gods, who generate entities in accordance with the supreme order; gods and the entities that they beget "make up" the great God. Yav ("actuality") is believed to be the plane of matter and appearance, the here and now in which things appear in light, coalesce, but also dissolve in contingency; Nav ("probability") is held to be the world of human ancestors, of spirit, consisting in the memory of the past and the projection of the future, that is to say the continuity of time.

== Descriptions ==
=== Triglav: soul, flesh and power ===
Represented as Triglav the three worlds are traditionally associated, respectively, to the three gods Svarog ("Heaven"), Perun ("Thunder") and Dažbog ("Sun") or Svarog, Perun, and Svetovid ("Sacred Lord") or Veles ("Underworld"). These three gods are also seen, respectively, as representing the qualities of soul, flesh and power. Perun and Svetovid are regarded as manifestations of the same Svarog, and other names for them are Dazhbog ("Giving God", "Day God") and Svarozhich (the god of fire, literally meaning "Son of Heaven"). The netherworld (Nav), especially in its dark aspect, is also traditionally embodied by Veles, who in this function is the god of waters but also the one who guides athwart them (cf. Sanskrit Varuna).

In his study of Slavic cosmology, Jiří Dynda (2014), identifies Triglav as a conception of the axis mundi, and compares it to similar concepts from other Indo-European cultures. He gives weight to the Triglav as a representation of what Georges Dumézil studied as the "Indo-European trifunctional hypothesis" (holy, martial and economic functions reflected by three human types and social classes).

The Triglav may also represents the interweaving of the three dimensions of time, metaphorically represented as a three-threaded rope. By Ebbo's words, the Triglav is definable as summus deus, the god representing the "sum" of the three dimensions of reality as a mountain or tree (themselves symbols of the axis mundi). According to Dynda, this threefold vision originating in Proto-Indo-European religion was also elaborated in early and medieval Christianity giving rise to the theology of God who is at the same time creator (father), creature (son) and creating activity (spirit).

=== Heaven, Earth and humanity in "genotheism" ===
In her theological commentaries to the Book of Veles, the Ukrainian Rodnover leader Halyna Lozko emphasises the cosmological unity of the three planes of Heaven, Earth and humanity between them. She gives a definition of Rodnover theology and cosmology as "genotheism". God, hierarchically manifesting as different hypostases, a multiplicity of gods emerging from the all-pervading force Svarog, is genetically (rodovid) linked to humanity. On the human plane God is incarnated by the progenitors/ancestors and the kin lineage, in the Earth. Ethics and morality ultimately stem from this cosmology, as harmony with nature is possible only in the relationship between an ethnic group and its own land. The same vision of a genetic essence of divinity is called "rodotheism" by the Rodnover denomination of the Ynglists.

The worship of human progenitors, such as the alleged forefather of the Slavs and Aryans "Or" or "Oryi", or local forefathers such as "Dingling" worshipped by Vladivostok Rodnovers, is common. Divine ancestors are believed to be the spirits who both kin and generators and holders together of kinship. The Russian volkhv and neo-Nazi leader Alexey Dobrovolsky (also known as Dobroslav) emphasised the importance of blood heritage, claiming that the violation of kinship purity brings about the loss of the relationship with the kin's divine ancestor.

== See also ==
- Nav (Slavic folklore)
- Triglav (mythology)
