= Volodymyr Shaian =

Ukrainian linguist and religious leader (1908–1974)

- Володимир Шаян
- Born: Volodymyr Petrovych Shaian; 2 August 1908; Lemberg, Galicia and Lodomeria, Austria-Hungary (now Lviv, Ukraine)
- Died: 15 July 1974 (aged 65); London, England
- Education: University of Lviv

Volodymyr Petrovych Shaian (Ukrainian: Володимир Петрович Шаян; 2 August 1908 – 15 July 1974) was a Ukrainian linguist, philologist and Orientalist-Sanskritologist. He was a pioneer of Slavic Native Faith in Ukraine during the interwar period.

== Biography ==
Shaian was educated at the University of Lviv. In 1934, he had a spiritual revelation at the top of Mount Grekhit in the Ukrainian Carpathian mountains. According to him, this inspired him to seek a pagan renewal. Shaian proposed a "pan-Aryan" approach to European paganism, developed in opposition to National Socialist Germany's focus on the Germanic world. Shaian presented his vision of a "pan-Aryan renaissance" in a paper at an Indologist seminar in Lviv in 1937. Shaian's theology was polytheistic and viewed God as a manifold essence that manifests itself through the various deities of Slavic mythology.

In 1944 he had to flee from Lviv. He spent time in refugee camps and became involved in the Ukrainian Free Academy of Sciences. Around the same time he founded the Order of the Knights of the Solar God, a religious-political organization active in the opposition to the Soviet invasion. Shaian worked to affiliate his group with the Ukrainian Insurgent Army. One of Shaian's initiates in this organization was Lev Sylenko, who eventually also became a major figure in Slavic Native Faith in Ukraine.

Shaian spent the latter part of his life in exile in London.

== Legacy ==
Like with other neopagan currents associated with the Eastern Bloc, the post-war Ukrainian diaspora in the West was important for the continuation of Shaian's teachings. Small communities of Shaian's followers were in particular active in Toronto and Hamilton in Canada. After the dissolution of the Soviet Union, the first organization in Ukraine to adhere to Shaian's polytheistic paganism was Pravoslavia, founded in Kyiv in 1993. It was created by the philologist, folklorist and religious studies scholar Halyna Lozko, who was initiated by Myroslav Sytnyk in Hamilton. Lozko has also launched projects such as the Svitovyd Center for the Rebirth of Ukrainian Culture, the School of the Native Faith, the Museum of the Book of Veles (1996–1998) and the journal Svaroh. To coordinate activities throughout Ukraine, Lozko co-founded the umbrella organization Native Faith Association of Ukraine (Об'єднання Рідновірів Україн, ORU) in 1998. It was officially registered as a pagan religious organization in 2001. It includes a number of local congregations and has made an effort to establish regular calendar celebrations. It has also been active in the neopagan interfaith activities of the European Congress of Ethnic Religions.

Shaian and Sylenko had parted ways by the 1970s, and came to represent two rivaling tendencies within the Slavic neopagan scene. Sylenko's theology sets itself apart from Shaian's by being more monotheistic. The rivalry has also led to conflicting accounts of Shaian's and Sylenko's involvement with each other, with Sylenko-derived RUNVira sources claiming that Sylenko never had been a disciple of Shaian.

== Sources ==
=== References ===
- Ivakhiv, Adrian (2005a). "In Search of Deeper Identities: Neopaganism and "Native Faith" in Contemporary Ukraine" (PDF). Nova Religio: The Journal of Alternative and Emergent Religions. 8 (3): 7–38. doi:10.1525/nr.2005.8.3.7. JSTOR 10.1525/nr.2005.8.3.7.
- Ivakhiv, Adrian (2005b). "The Revival of Ukrainian Native Faith". In Strmiska, Michael F. Modern Paganism in World Cultures. Santa Barbara, California: ABC-CLIO. ISBN 978-1-85109-608-4.
- Lesiv, Mariya (2013). The Return of Ancestral Gods: Modern Ukrainian Paganism as an Alternative Vision for a Nation. McGill-Queen's Studies in the History of Religion. Vol. 2. McGill-Queen's Press - MQUP. ISBN 978-0773589667.
