= Russian vedism =

Branch of Rodnovery

The Sword of Ary is a prominent symbol of Kandybaism. Ary is the forefather of all Aryans or Russians informed by the cosmic Ur, the Son God, the law proceeding from the supreme Father God of the north celestial pole and incarnating in the material vessel represented by the Mother Goddess of the Lights.

The Russian Religion (Russian: Русская Религия), also termed Russian Vedism (Русский Ведизм), is one of the earliest doctrines of Rodnovery (Slavic Neopaganism) in Russia, founded in 1992 in Saint Petersburg by the psychologist and esoteric scientist Viktor Mikhaylovich Kandyba—revered as "Prophet Kandyba" within the movement—and his son Dimitry Viktorovich Kandyba. It is a monotheism based on Slavic heritage, and as such it has been compared to Ukrainian Sylenkoism. The concept of "Russian" in the name "Russian Religion" does not identify an ethnic identity, but a spiritual one, being used as a synonym of the concept of "Aryan".

== Overview ==
Viktor M. Kandyba grew up in the Soviet Union, in an environment of Marxist–Leninist atheism which viewed religion as a merely political and social tool. He attended a naval school in Saint Petersburg (then Leningrad) and was possibly influenced by Viktor Bezverkhy, the founder of Peterburgian Vedism, who taught there in the 1970s. Kandyba graduated in psychology and studied esotericism. He claimed to be the descendant of a line of ancient Russian priests, what he named Vedic "ideologists" or samans (саман). Together with his son Dimitry Viktorovich, he became popular in Russia in the late 1980s for their studies about the psychological "culture of trance" and their practice of hypnosis which they claimed to be unbroken traditions of "Russian Vedism".

In the 1990s, Viktor Kandyba began to elaborate and disseminate his own doctrine of "Russian Religion", first systematically presented in his book History of the Russian Empire published in 1997. In the creation of the literature about the "Russian Religion", Kandyba collaborated with the academic historian Petr Zolin. The "Russian Religion" does not acknowledge a hierarchic church organisation, as Kandyba himself preached that there is direct link between mankind and God, and therefore there is no need of mediating structures. Kandyba's doctrine has thus been defined by the scholar Victor Shnirelman as a "highly eclectic" Rodnovery characterised by monotheism, a "national Russian monotheistic religion" comparable to a "Russian Protestantism" and, within Rodnovery itself, to Ukrainian Sylenkoism. Shnirelman saw in Kandybaite Vedic cosmology a reflection of Zoroastrian cosmological dualism, and also saw similarities with Helena Blavatsky's Theosophy and German Ariosophy. The scholar Alexey V. Gaidukov found Kandybaite Vedic historiosophy to be similar to that of Aleksandr Dugin's Eurasianism.

Kandyba argued that the "Russian Religion", or the "Russian Vedism" that it represented, is the foundation of all later historical religions, and that it also corresponds to the original teachings of Jesus, which were distorted by the compilers of the Bible and by the creators of the Christian religion who introduced the concepts of sin and atoning sacrifice. The book History of the Russian Empire draws and reinterprets content from the Bible and the Hindu Rigveda, including entire extracts such as the Sermon on the Mount, expressions and prayers, and in doing so it claims to be returning ancient wisdom to its original possessors, the Aryans.

== Beliefs ==
=== Theology and cosmology ===
==== Threefold essence of the One ====
According to Kandybaite Vedic theology, the universe arises from the "One"—Yedinobog (Единобог, "One-God"; also Единый Бог, Yediny Bog, "One God") or simply Odin (Один, which in Russian means precisely the "One")—which acts as the spinning force of the north pole of the sky, which is the intracosmic paradise (Iriy) image of the extracosmic eternal paradise (Svarga). The One is threefold in its essence, reflecting such structure in both the macrocosm of the universe and the microcosm of the human psychophysical system. The north pole is the "starry origination" (звездная прародина, zvezdnaya prarodyna) of the Aryans or Russians, where the triune essence of the One shows itself most clearly.

The trinity of the One is composed of the following deities:

1. The Father God (Бог-Отец) – which is the primordial quiescent void, the ideal informational supreme, the unmanifested dimension, corresponding in the microcosm of the human body to the left hemisphere of the brain;
2. The Mother Goddess of the Lights/Fires (Богиня-Мать Огни) or Mother Goddess of the World (Богиня-Мать Мира) – which is the spiritual movement, the ideal figurative transience, the manifested dimension, the universal gravity and the right hemisphere of the brain.
3. The Son God (Бог-Сын), Ur (Ур) – which is the electromagnetic radiation generated by the God and the Goddess, and the human psyche itself, whose energy is the basis of life.

Furthermore, Ur is the procreator of Oriy (Орий) or Oriya (Ория), the first god-man who gave cosmic knowledge to humanity and who acted as the forefather of all the Aryans or Russians.

In cosmological terms, the God and the Goddess are also described respectively as spirit and matter, the active life-giving masculine principle and the passive life-receiving feminine principle, and as the "two beginnings of the One" or "two eternal poles of the Great Void" (Великая Пустота, Velikaya Pustota), while Ur is described as the informational "waves" which develop and awaken the material substance into the universe and its self-creating peak—mankind, building forms around the universal vortex of the quiescent void. The waves of Ur express themselves as sound, light and word, but at the very beginning as the image of the word in itself, which is the starry image of the God and the Goddess—the "starry fiery cross" (swastika) drawn by the circumpolar stars.

==== Sevenfold manifestation of the One ====
Representation of the theo-cosmology of Kandybaite Vedism.

Divinity is nativity and what generates everything is the power of the One, which is the universal spinning represented by the hooked cross rotating at the north celestial pole. The circumpolar stars themselves are the symbolic image of the Goddess, the figurative transient manifestation of the One. The rhythmic rotation of the pole (Prav) is the information for the development of both the united unmanifested (Nav) and manifested (Yav) dimensions of reality. The unmanifested dimension is also the Great Void, and since every manifested entity comes from the unmanifested Great Void, everything in the manifested dimension carries within itself the Great Void. The rhythmic rotation of development is set by both the poles of the One, the masculine God and the feminine Goddess, and it proceeds from the unmanifested Great Void generating Ur, the first light, which organises itself as the five elements of the manifested dimension—the Force Field (Поле Сила, Pole Sila) which functions as the fourfold receptacle of Fire, Air, Water and Soil. The light of Ur is like a fire which illuminates and drives the manifested world to its peak, that is the development of enlightened mankind, and which becomes aware of itself in such enlightened mankind, represented by Oriy. Ur is the Father God itself coming in transient nature as Oriy, thus the Son God and the Father God are One through the Mother Goddess of the Lights.

The complete expression of the One is thus sevenfold, as it includes the trinity of information (God), transient image (Goddess), plus the five elements of the manifested cosmos as expressions of light (Ur), and ultimately the perfected mind of a deified mankind represented by Oriy. In Kandybaite Vedic theology there is an identity between divinity and humanity, especially the latter's mind informed by the "idea of God"; a founding dictum of Kandybaite Vedism is:

First there was the idea, and the idea was in God, and God was the idea.

According to Kandyba, the One realises itself through mankind, through its imaginative thinking which is the means for realising the "Divine Kingdom":

We Russians have that very ideal world, that God, which is created by our own ideas, imaginations and feelings; therefore the fate of the Kingdom of God is resolved not only in Heaven, but within each of us ... We create God, and God again creates the manifested world, which is the reality that surrounds us, and thus, our own brain, our thoughts and images, create that life in which we are all and therefore the Kingdom of God is within us and we ourselves are responsible for choosing the path leading to God.

— Kandyba's Rigveda, 1996, ch. 1.

The human being is actively involved in a co-creation with the One: in the psychic life of the human being the manifested dimension acquires the ability to radiate forms—images and informations—back into the unmanifested dimension and then again into the manifested dimension. In other words, God begins the creation and mankind develops and completes it. The left side of the human brain is the receptacle of the ideal informations of the Father God, while the right hemisphere of the brain expresses the ideal figures of the Mother Goddess of the Lights; the human psyche, as the begotten Son God and the progenitor Oriy, closes the circle of being—from the One it descends and to the One its thoughts return. The left side is spiritual, theoretical and logical while the right side—which includes the oldest parts of the brain—is animal, practical and metaphorical; according to Kandybaite Vedists the left hemisphere is that which distinguishes mankind from animals, and should be developed as much as possible from an early stage of life.

==== Cycles of manifestation and demanifestation ====
According to Kandybaite Vedic cosmology, the universe is eternal and it exists in the manifested dimension (Yav) for a limited time known as the "Day of Infinity" (День Беспредельности, Den' Bespredel'nosti), lasting for billions of years, at the end of which it disappears again reabsorbed into the unmanifested dimension (Nav) for a time known as the "Night of Infinity" (Ночь Беспредельности, Noch' Bespredel'nosti), which lasts the same as the Day of Infinity. Days of Infinity and Nights of Infinity alternate one another ongoingly from always and for ever. The universe is only apparently time–space, as these two concepts are representations of the sequence of changing forms of the emanation of the One from Nav to Yav, preserved as a unified whole by the constant wave of Ur.

The manifested world is the battlefield of spiritual forces of good and material forces of evil, which are objective realities rather than subjective categories, as "good " is any force which favours the maintenance of the cosmic order (Prav) while "evil" is any force which disrupts it. Bright good forces are believed to come from the God of Heaven, from Svarga or Iriy at the north celestial pole, while dark evil forces are believed to come from Navya (Навья), the chthonic goddess of the Earth and of the south celestial pole, governed by her male counterpart Yama; bright forces and dark forces are associated respectively to the left side and the right side of the brain in the microcosm of the human body, and are collectively represented respectively by Belobog (Белобог, "White-God") and Chernobog (Чернобог, "Black-God").

The polarity of good and evil forces manifests itself in the four directions of space: good entities manifest themselves in the north and the east directions, associated with the heavenly seat of God and the movement of its law, and characterised by spirituality, light, purity and eternity; evil entities manifest themselves in the south and west directions, characterised by materiality, darkness, mixing and depravity. There is an eternal struggle between the two poles of the web of forces, as the southern and western forces try to corrupt the northern and the eastern spiritual entities, while the northern and eastern forces try to sublimate the southern and western material entities. In History of the Russian Empire Kandyba says:

The South is the kingdom of substance, biology and instinct which corrupt the Northern, early Russian purity of tradition. [...] The nature of the East in its opposition to the West is a domination of spirit over bestial substance, a final victory of light, justice and purity over the darkness of the bestial Western life, the tyranny of instincts and the dirt of low egoism.

==== Oriy and the god-men of nations ====
Ur is the god-builder of the manifested universe, drawing the images of the Mother Goddess of the Lights and realising them in structures, creating and recreating the manifested dimension in always better schemes which reintegrate and reorganise the images of the previous cycles. If the dimension of the stars lives according to the law of Ur, the world of humanity lives according to the law of Oriy, the first god-man, progenitor of all the Aryans or Russians, who drew from the order of the sky the holy laws for the spiritual realisation of a deified mankind. Sharing an idea similar to the Nietzschean concept of the "god-man", Kandybaite Vedists believe that each man has the potential to become a deity, a folk spirit, that is to say a man conscious of his divine nature and ability to co-create with the One.

In Kandybaite Vedism, the concept of "nation" or "folk" (narod) is not understood as defined by geographical boundaries, but rather as a living entity generated by a divine spirit. According to the Kandybaite Vedic doctrine, the folk deity manifests itself as and through a network of characteristics which are transmitted genetically between generations of individuals; its core never changes and is potentially immortal, though its network is open to the assimilation of other characteristics through miscegenation and evolutionary transformations. Kandybaite Vedists therefore believe, like other Rodnovers, that collectivity is superior to individuality: it is the collective identity that gives life and meaning to the single individual entity, and immortality is achievable by the mortal individual only when he works within the spirit of the collective folk. In the case of the Russians, their guiding deity Oriy expresses himself as warlike attitude, abstract consciousness, aspiration to unrestricted freedom, and friendliness and hospitality. The Russians are also characterised by intuitive and imaginative thought, which are given by their high spiritualisation and intimate knowledge of God and its laws.

=== Historiosophy ===
==== Mythological origins of the Aryans ====
Viktor Kandyba's book History of the Russian Empire has been described by the scholar Victor Shnirelman as taking inspiration from the Bible, from the Old Testament, especially in its presentation of a scheme of the development of humanity based on genealogical principles, a scheme whose core are the Aryans or Russians. As they are the progeny of Ur through Oriy, these peoples are also called "Orussians" (Орусы) or "Urussians" (Урусы). According to Shnirelman, the myth about the origins of the Aryans of Kandybaite Vedism draws inspiration from Helena Blavatsky's Theosophy and from German Ariosophy. Alexey V. Gaidukov also traced it back to the Greek idea of Hyperborea, which is also the basis of Aleksandr Dugin's Eurasianism.

Kandybaite Vedic mythology holds that Oriy was a being made of subtle substance; he did not have a dense body and thanks to this he could not only walk but also fly. Besides being associated to the power of the north pole, Oriy is also related to the constellation of Orion. The Orussians whom he generated were a race of subtle-bodied men and they dwelt at the terrestrial North Pole, the Arctic—right under the divine north celestial pole and the pole star—, which was then occupied by a continent known as Oryana (Ориана), Arctida (Арктида) or Oratta (Оратта). The Orussians, like their forefather Oriy, were able to fly, and their appearance when flying resembled that of kites. Through millions of years, hominids appeared in the southern hemisphere of the terrestrial globe and the Orussians—who had to abandon Oryana as it was destroyed by cataclysms and glaciation, and mostly settled throughout Eurasia in the northern hemisphere of the terrestrial globe—gradually mixed with such hominids acquiring a denser nature and giving origin to the modern Russian races—the white race. They became mortal entities, entering the cycle of reincarnation and acquiring the knowledge of good and evil. Meanwhile, the black race (Africans) who occupied the southern hemisphere of the terrestrial globe and the friendly yellow race (Asians) with whom the Russians had frequent exchanges emerged as direct evolutions of the hominids. From Eurasia, the Russians explored the world founding all high civilisations.

After the Orussians became materialised by mating with the hominids, the history of the Russians was an endless sequence of rising, blossoming and falling apart as their love for freedom prevented them from establishing an enduring centralised civilisation in Eurasia: as they strived to create the largest world empire embracing all of Eurasia, it always fragmented into multiple states and peoples at war with one another. They organised themselves in kindred communities of about one hundred people. In each community, the ideological power was represented by the Vedic samans (priests) who wrote down the principles of religious civilisation in the Rigveda, the administrative power was exercised by chiefs and rulers, and the legislative power was exercised by the elders of the kin. Their society was strictly patriarchal, as the lineages proceeded from males, males governed the kins, and all the male sons of fathers-brothers were considered peers, although great importance was attributed to women in their function as reproducers of life. All properties, lands and livestock, were shared by the members of the same kin. A small number of kins were not sedentary farmers and chose to be nomadic herders.

In Kandybaite Vedism, the modern term "Russians" therefore identifies most of the inhabitants of Eurasia, including both those of the white race (Europeans) and those of the yellow race (Asians). Being Russian is considered a spiritual identity which characterises all those people who retain the memory of the Arctic homeland and live in harmony in and with any territory where they find themselves. As the descendants of the god-men who created all civilisations, the Russians are considered a "chosen" and "holy people" of carriers of the idea of God. Kandybaite Vedists consider the Jews as part of the Asians, and as such as part of the northern and eastern spiritual humanity opposed to the southern and western material humanity, and at the same time they espouse the Khazar hypothesis of Ashkenazi ancestry, considering the Jews as a "branch of the southern Russians", that is to say of the "Volga Russians", and as descendants of the historical Khazars. Their culture first arose in Ur, Mesopotamia, when contrarily to all the other tribes of the Russians, in which the spiritual side dominates the material one, their ancestor Abraham adopted a way of thinking and acting in which the material dominates the spiritual.

==== Ethical eschatology ====
In Kandybaite Vedism, the Russians are destined to an eschatological task for the sake of the One: the elimination of evil from the world and the establishment of the Divine Kingdom. Such work starts from the inside of every person, as God is both the external cause of everything and the internal drive to the realisation of goodness. Good is what develops the cosmos, while evil is what destroys it: good or evil thoughts and words produced by a person are believed to acquire an independent existence and to influence the surrounding context and everything in it, nourishing the cohorts of good or evil forces in the world; through the suppression of evil thoughts and earthly material drives and the development of good thoughts and heavenly spiritual motives a person may take part in the struggle against evil in the world.

Every manifested person has two natures: its spirit inside its animal nature; the spiritual mind awakens not when a person is born but later in life, when the instincts of the animal nature are already rooted in its existence. The instincts of material nature which pervade the body have not to be destroyed but sublimated and used as means for spiritualisation. Every manifested person has an allotted time during which it has to work through its given resources for its own spiritual self-realisation and for the preservation and further development of life according to the law of God. When the role for which a given person is born comes to completion, that given entity begins to decay towards death, after which its life experience is preserved and coalesces again into new forms of existence, more complex than the previous one.

In the Rigveda, Viktor Kandyba paraphrases the Gospel of John 3:1–8 to explain such double nature of humanity:

To be born again means to be born not by a carnal birth, as a child is born from the mother, but to be born in the spirit. To be born in the spirit means to understand that the spirit of God lives in a person and that, besides the fact that every person is born of the mother, he is also born of the spirit of God. That person who is born of the flesh is flesh, it suffers and dies, but that person who is born of the spirit is spirit and lives by himself and can neither suffer nor die.

— Kandyba's Rigveda, 1996, ch. 2.

Kandybaite Vedism is characterised by a work ethic: labour is glorified to the extent that it serves public and not private interests, devoted to the highest end, that is the alignment of the people with the good forces of the law of God. By co-working with good forces and fighting evil forces, Kandybaite Vedists believe that the Russians will lead the way for the gradual transfiguration of humanity into immortal beings of light. Dimitry Kandyba wrote about a future macrocosmic "victory of Yav" (the manifested dimension which he identified as being the same as the Canaanite Yahweh) through Russian values, which will be the reflection of a microcosmic victory of the bright spiritual side of a human being over his dark material nature.

The adherents of the Kandybaite Vedic doctrine insist on kindness and compassion, positive feelings and cheerfulness, at the same time blaming hopeless, weak and disabled people, holding that the quality of god-man and the realisation of the Divine Kingdom are reachable only through the complete overcoming of suffering. They refuse the idea of collective sin, and believe that suffering is always the outcome of the guilt of those individuals who choose and encourage lie, idleness, self-interest, thirst for power, intoxication, lust, adultery, and other vices. The adherents also refute luxury and call for a modest life, also coming to a critique of property as a hurdle to a sinless life. These sins, which progressively nourish the animal nature of a person while smothering its spiritual mind, are believed to be transmitted through the generations and to hinder the development of love and therefore of the spiritualisation of humanity in the Divine Kingdom. Also the harnessing of the faith in God into hierarchic church structures and lavish temples is believed to be a deception which hinders spiritual development and makes people believe that God is not in themselves and in every entity, but merely within the church and its representatives.

As good forces incarnate themselves in the north and east, and evil forces in the south and west, Kandybaite Vedists also envision a geopolitical alliance between the Russians and the Asians in opposition to the evil Western world, establishing a new Russian Empire spanning all Eurasia from Europe to the Pacific Ocean, and from the Arctic to the Indian Ocean. According to Victor Shnirelman, these ideas have antecedents in Russian cosmism, and are particularly prominent in contemporary Eurasianism.

== Practices ==
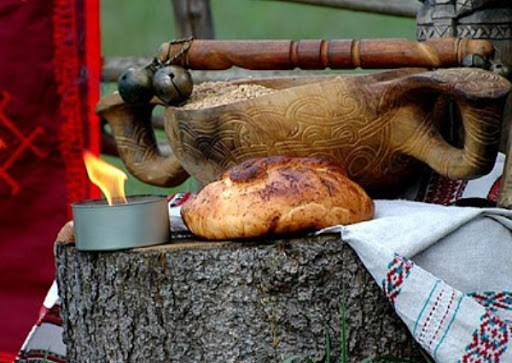
Treba, a sacrificial offering in the style of the Kandybaite Vedic tradition.

The Rigveda written by Viktor Kandyba provides descriptions of the celebrations and ritual practices of the pre-Christian Russians. It also provides descriptions and a specific lexicon for the reconstruction of the ancient Russian social structure, with words pertaining to the semantic field of the kin all containing the concept Ur: for instance, relatives belonging to the same kin are called uruta, the youngest in the kin are called urus, while couples united in marriage are called uru.

=== Worship rites and prayer ===
According to Kandybaism, Russians deeply feel their kinship with the cosmos and the environment, worshipping its elements as deities, on holidays or daily. The major ones are considered the gods of sky (Svarog, Nebo), fire (Ogni the holy fire and Atar the home hearth) and water (Voda) as well as the god of cattle (Skotybog). Places of worship may be glades with poles representing the gods (kapishche) or temple buildings (khram).

The gods of nature are worshipped through zaotra (заотра) and treba (треба); the former are libations and the latter are sacrificial offerings. The yasna (ясна) is the daily ritual practised by the samans (priests), carried out near a river, stream of lake, in a flat place delimited by furrows forming a rectangle, consecrated by sprinkling holy water and reciting prayers; the priest sits cross-legged in front of a vessel at the centre of the rectangle which hosts the holy fire. A yasna has three components: two zaotras, respectively to fire and to water, and a treba.

A zaotra for water gods is made of three components, namely milk, juice of jointfir and leaves of other plants, and the libation has to be performed by the priest in the presence of the head of a kin and poured in the stream or river nearest to the kin's residence. A zaotra for fire gods is made of other three components, namely dry clean firewood, herbal incense, and a small amount of animal fat from treba. The latter is an offering, often involving the sacrifice of an animal, whose soul is consecrated through a prayer to ascend to the God of Heaven through the smoke of the cooked meat which is eaten by the priests and the participants to the ritual. The cattle god is offered the tongue and left jawbone of each sacrificed animal.

According to Kandyba's Rigveda, another characteristic Russian ritual is the common worship of the "heavenly sword" (небесный меч, nebesny mech), symbol of Oriy, of the descent of divine awareness from the God of Heaven; the Aryan progenitor and God are also represented in images with blue halos around their head to symbolise the sky. Kandybaite Vedists also practise a style of yoga known as "Russian yoga" (русская йога), and emphasise the daily practice of prayer as a "constant consciousness of the presence of God" and as a means for strengthening the spirit of a person over its sinful material nature. Kandyba's Rigveda recommends a version of the Lord's Prayer taught by Jesus, considered a great Russian Vedist:

Our Father which art in Heaven, let your name shine; let your kingdom come; let your will be done on Earth as in Heaven; give our daily bread for every day; and forgive us our sins, so just as we forgive all those who have sinned against us, and deliver us from temptation and evil.

— Kandyba's Rigveda, 1996, ch. 2.

=== Holiday celebrations and death rites ===
The major holidays are at the beginning of spring (Komoyeditsa or Maslenitsa) and in mid summer (Kupala Night), but any kindred community may organise celebrations on any occasion. The celebrations are characterised by games, competitions, and religious rituals always led by a priest.

Holiday celebrations always begin with a ritual in which a priest with nine boys to his right and nine girls to his left, forming a row, stand at the centre of three large concentric circles of people, the first of the kins' elders, the second of their kindred adult relatives, and the third of the youth. The priest takes a goblet full of the intoxicating drink soma (сома) or sura (сура) made with jointfir, kneels down on his left and while facing the sky to the east or the Sun to the south sings hymns asking for the blessing of the kins. The priest then takes a sip of the drink and passes the goblet to his helper boys and girls. He then takes another cup of the drink and does the same passing it to the elders of the kins standing in circle. The purpose of the soma is to facilitate the visit to the seat of the God of Heaven at the north pole, Svarga, with the help of the god of fire as a guide.

Regarding funeral practices, the Rigveda recommends the cremation of the bodies of the "clean" dead—those who have died of old age or in combat—, especially people of high rank, which have to be burnt on top of specially constructed stone altars (alatyr), as their soul is believed to ascend with the smoke to the seat of the God of Heaven, the northern polar paradise; the bodies of "unclean" dead—those who have died of contagious disease, suicide, drowning or of a violent death not in combat—are instead buried, as they are believed to belong to the goddess of the underworld.

=== Numerical symbolism ===
Rodnovery in general rejects numerology and forms of medieval magic if numbers are conceived as abstract and not connected with objects of the real world, but accepts numerology if the numbers are seen in webs of symbolism with objects, as manifesting in objects of the real world; in such vision, which is systematised particularly well in Kandybaism, all the entities of reality may be regarded in connection with each other in the hierarchic process of creation emanated by the One, in which each stage of manifestation is correlated with a number.

Kandybaite Vedic doctrine associates seven iconic symbols to the seven stages of the emanation of reality from the One, the Yedinobog ("One God"): the number 1 is symbolised by the circle, which represents the unity of the entire cosmology, the eternity and cyclicality of time, the unmanifested Great Void and the Yedinobog itself; the number 2 is symbolised by the swastika in its two possible directions of rotation—rightward and leftward—, which represent all the tensional dualities proceeding from the One, like the unmanifested (Nav) and the manifested (Yav) dimensions, the Father God and the Mother Goddess, as well as the spatio-temporal dimensions of Heaven and Earth, Belobog and his bright rightwise forces and Chernobog and his dark leftwise forces, north and south, life and death, creation and destruction; the number 3 is symbolised by the circle containing three dots, which represent the trinity, the triune essence of the One as Father God, Mother Goddess and Son God (Ur), as well as the "starry origination" of the Russians; the number 4 is symbolised by the "heavenly sword" of Oriy, pointing downwards with three dots inside the pommel and five rays emanating from the pommel, representing heavenly knowledge of the trinity of the One coming in the flesh as the progenitor of the Russians (Oriy); the number 5 is symbolised by the five-pointed star, which represents the five elements of Ur in the manifested dimension, Fire, Air, Water, Soil, and Force Field; the number 6 is symbolised by the six-pointed star, which represents the human reason, Ur coming in the flesh as Oriy and becoming conscious of itself and master of all elements; the number 7, the most sacred, reflected in the seven days of the week, has no iconic image for itself as it is symbolised by all the other symbols taken together, to represent the whole sevenfold nature of the One.

== Kandybaite Vedic texts ==
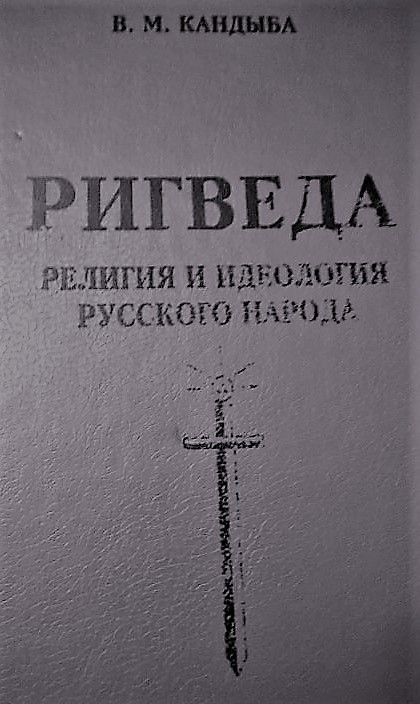
Kandyba's Rigveda, first published in 1996

Books written by Viktor Kandyba expounding the doctrines of the "Russian Religion" and Kandybaite psychology:

1. Basics of Hypnology (Основы гипнологии), 3 volumes
2. Technique of Hypnosis in Reality (Техника гипноза наяву), 2 volumes
3. World Techniques of Therapeutic Hypnosis (Мировые техники лечебного гипноза)
4. Hypnosis and Disease (Гипноз и болезни), 2 volumes
5. Magic of the Universe (Магия вселенной)
6. Russian Religion (Русская Религия)
7. Hypnosis Treatment (Лечение гипнозом)
8. Secrets and Wonders of the Human Psyche (Тайны и чудеса человеческой психики)
9. Miracles of the Past and Present (Чудеса прошлого и настоящего)
10. Practice of Therapeutic Hypnosis (Практика лечебного гипноза)
11. Secrets of Psychotronic Weapons (Тайны психотронного оружия)
12. SC-Method of Human Development (СК-метод развития человека)
13. Criminal Hypnosis (Криминальный гипноз), 2 volumes
14. SC. The Universal Technique of Hypnosis (СК. Универсальная техника гипноза)
15. Secrets of the Russian Land (Тайны земли русской)
16. Trance Miracles (Трансовые чудеса)
17. Great Mysteries of History (Великие загадки истории)
18. History of the Jewish People (История еврейского народа)
19. World Experience of Spiritual Self-Development (Мировой опыт духовного саморазвития)
20. Pharmacological Hypnosis (Фармакологический гипноз)
21. Unidentified and Incredible (Неопознанное и невероятное)
22. Forbidden History (Запрещенная история)
23. Miracles and Mystery (Чудеса и тайна)
24. History of the Great Russian People (История великого русского народа)
25. Great Secrets of the World (Великие тайны мира)
26. Mental Self-Regulation (Психическая саморегуляция)
27. Miracles and Mysteries of all Times (Чудеса и тайны всех времен)
28. Magic (Магия)
29. Popular Hypnosis (Эстрадный гипноз)
30. Miracles and Wonderworkers (Чудеса и чудотворцы)
31. Superpowers of Man (Сверхвозможности человека)
32. Technique of Mental Hypnosis (Техника мысленного гипноза)
33. History of the Russian Empire (История Русской Империи)
34. History and Ideology of the Russian People (История и идеология русского народа), 2 volumes

== See also ==
- Rodnovery
  - Peterburgian Vedism
  - Sylenkoism
- Eurasianism
- Russian cosmism
- Theosophy
- Zoroastrianism
