= Orthotes =

Philosophy concept

Orthotes (Greek: ὀρθότης "rightness") is a concept defined by Martin Heidegger as "an eye's correctness" or, the passage from the physical eyes to the eyes of the intellect. In his essay, "The End of Philosophy and the Task of Thinking," Heidegger distinguishes "orthotes" from his concept of "aletheia" ("unconcealment"), describing it as "the correctness of representations and statements."

== See also ==
- Ṛta
