= Adrian Ivakhiv =

Canadian scholar of environmental humanities and ecomedia

Adrian J. Ivakhiv
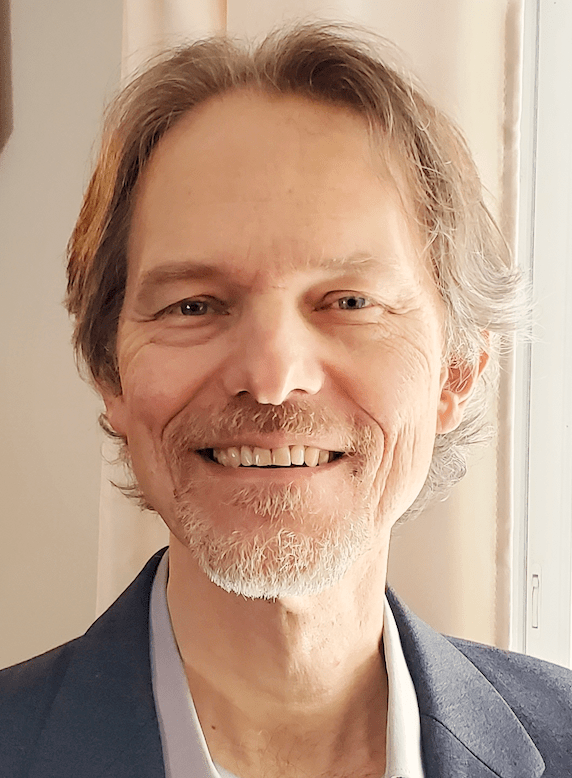
- Ivakhiv in 2024
- Title: J. S. Woodsworth Chair in the Humanities (2024-present)
- Awards: Steven Rubenstein Professorship (2016–2020); University Scholar, University of Vermont; Fulbright Scholar (Ukraine-Germany, 2022–2023)

Academic background
- Education: York University (BFA, MES, PhD)

Academic work
- Discipline: Environmental humanities, ecomedia studies, religion and nature
- Institutions: Simon Fraser University; University of Vermont; University of Wisconsin Oshkosh; York University
- Main interests: Ecology and culture, philosophy of cinema, the Anthropocene, Ukrainian environmental politics
- Notable works: Ecologies of the Moving Image (2013); Shadowing the Anthropocene (2018); The New Lives of Images (2025)
- Website: site.uvm.edu/aivakhiv

Adrian J. Ivakhiv is a Canadian-American scholar of environmental humanities, ecomedia studies, and religion and nature. He holds the J. S. Woodsworth Chair in the Humanities in the Department of Global Humanities at Simon Fraser University. Previously, he was Professor of Environmental Thought and Culture at the University of Vermont (2003–2024), where he also held the Steven Rubenstein Professorship for Environment and Natural Resources (2016–2020).

His work on cinema and ecology has been described as a major contribution to the field of ecocritical film studies.

Ivakhiv is also a musician and a composer.

== Early life and education ==
Ivakhiv was born in Toronto to parents who had come to Canada as refugees from Ukraine after World War II. He received a Bachelor of Fine Arts (Honours) from York University in 1985, a Master of Environmental Studies from York in 1991, and a Ph.D. in Environmental Studies from York in 1997. In 1989–1990, he was a Canada-USSR Scholar, spending a year in Kyiv and Lviv studying the cultural impacts of the Chernobyl disaster.

== Career ==
Ivakhiv taught at York University from 1997 to 2000 in various capacities, including as adjunct faculty and lecturer in the Faculty of Environmental Studies and the Division of Humanities. He was an assistant professor of environmental studies and religious studies at the University of Wisconsin Oshkosh from 2000 to 2003.

In 2003, he joined the University of Vermont, where he was promoted to full professor in 2013. He served as acting director of the Environmental Program in 2011 and held the Steven Rubenstein Professorship for Environment and Natural Resources from 2016 to 2020. He was also named a University Scholar and a Public Humanities Fellow at UVM. At UVM, he co-founded and coordinated EcoCultureLab, a research group linking ecological art, scholarship, and community projects. In October 2018, he organized the symposium-festival "Feverish World, 2018–2068: Arts and Sciences of Collective Survival" in Burlington, Vermont, through the EcoCultureLab. He was named Professor Emeritus upon his departure in May 2024.

Ivakhiv was interviewed by Krista Tippett on the NPR program On Being in 2006, discussing paganism and environmental spirituality. He was also profiled in Post-Continental Voices: Selected Interviews, a volume of conversations with philosophers edited by Paul John Ennis.

Ivakhiv was a co-founder of the Environmental Studies Association of Canada and served as its president from 1999 to 2000.

In 2024, Ivakhiv was appointed to the J. S. Woodsworth Chair in the Humanities at Simon Fraser University.

He was a visiting scholar at the University of California, Santa Barbara Film and Media Studies department and the Carsey-Wolf Center in spring 2022. He is a fellow of the Gund Institute for Environment at the University of Vermont, the Rachel Carson Center for Environment and Society at LMU Munich, and was a research fellow at the Cinepoetics Centre for Advanced Film Studies at Freie Universität Berlin (2022–2023), where he participated in a research project on visuality and the Anthropocene.

He has conducted fieldwork on eco-cultural conflicts in the U.S. Southwest, the British Isles, western and central Ukraine, maritime eastern Canada, and Vermont.

=== Ecomedia and cinema ===
Ivakhiv has described his four monographs as a tetralogy, each extending a process-relational theory of imagination and its place in human-nature relations. His 2013 book Ecologies of the Moving Image: Cinema, Affect, Nature (Wilfrid Laurier University Press) proposed a "process-relational" eco-philosophy of cinema, drawing on the work of Charles Sanders Peirce and Alfred North Whitehead. It is the most widely cited book of ecocinema theory. (Note: The book has the highest citation count for any book in this field on Google Scholar, with over 500 citations as of 2026.) His 2025 book The New Lives of Images: Digital Ecologies and Anthropocene Imaginaries in More-than-Human Worlds (Stanford University Press) extends this framework to digital media, tracing how images shape perception and politics in the Anthropocene.

He is a co-editor of The Routledge Handbook of Ecomedia Studies (2023), alongside Antonio López, Stephen Rust, Miriam Tola, Alenda Y. Chang, and Kiu-wai Chu. He is also founding co-editor of Media+Environment, an open access peer-reviewed journal published by the University of California Press.

=== Anthropocene and environmental thought ===
His 2018 book Shadowing the Anthropocene: Eco-Realism for Turbulent Times (Punctum Books), published in open access, develops a process-relational philosophy applied to the Anthropocene and ecological "sacrifice zones."

=== Religion, pilgrimage, and nature ===
His first book, Claiming Sacred Ground: Pilgrims and Politics at Glastonbury and Sedona (Indiana University Press, 2001), is a study of cultural conflict over landscape at sites of ecospirituality. He was executive editor of the Encyclopedia of Religion and Nature (2005, Continuum), a two-volume reference work with over 500 contributing scholars, and has served on the editorial boards of Journal for the Study of Religion, Nature, and Culture, Green Letters, The Journal of Ecocriticism, and Environmental Communication. In 2010, he was invited to speak on environmental pilgrimage at an international symposium on pilgrimage held at the Instituto de Estudios Gallegos Padre Sarmiento in Santiago de Compostela, Spain.

=== Ukraine ===
Ivakhiv has written on environmental politics, cultural identity, and religion in Ukraine, including work on the cultural politics of Chornobyl, Ukrainian-Polish borderland identities, Ukrainian environmental ethics, and Ukrainian Native Faith movements. He has conducted research in Ukraine intermittently since his 1989–1990 Canada-USSR fellowship. Since 2014, he has maintained the blog UKR-TAZ: A Ukrainian Temporary Autonomous Zone, on Ukrainian politics and culture.

He was awarded a Fulbright Scholar grant for 2022–2023, originally intended for Ukraine; due to the full-scale Russian invasion, the fellowship was redirected to Freie Universität Berlin. Terra Invicta: Ukrainian Wartime Reimaginings for a Habitable Earth (McGill-Queen's University Press, 2025), published in open access, is an anthology he edited of Ukrainian scholars and artists writing in response to the Russo-Ukrainian war. The volume was supported by the Shevchenko Scientific Society and the Olga M. Ciupka Memorial Fund. In the volume’s introduction, Ivakhiv argues that the Russo-Ukrainian war is an "environmental war" best understood through a political-ecological lens, and develops a "climate-decolonial" framework for analyzing contemporary conflicts. Slavoj Žižek has written that the book "deserves to become an instant classic, a volume that everyone who wants to grasp the contours of our global crisis should read." Ivakhiv has been a guest at the International Book Arsenal Festival at Mystetskyi Arsenal in Kyiv, and the Leipziger Buchmesse in Leipzig, speaking on ecology and the war in Ukraine.

== Selected works ==
=== Books ===
- Claiming Sacred Ground: Pilgrims and Politics at Glastonbury and Sedona (Indiana University Press, 2001)
- Ecologies of the Moving Image: Cinema, Affect, Nature (Wilfrid Laurier University Press, 2013)
- Shadowing the Anthropocene: Eco-Realism for Turbulent Times (Punctum Books, 2018)
- The New Lives of Images: Digital Ecologies and Anthropocene Imaginaries in More-than-Human Worlds (Stanford University Press, 2025)
- Terra Invicta: Ukrainian Wartime Reimaginings for a Habitable Earth (ed., McGill-Queen's University Press, 2025)
- Routledge Handbook of Ecomedia Studies (co-ed., Routledge, 2023)

=== Review articles ===
- Ivakhiv, Adrian. "Toward a multicultural ecology." Organization and Environment 15, no. 4 (2002): 389-409.
- Ivakhiv, Adrian. "Nature and self in New Age pilgrimage." Culture and Religion 4, no. 1 (2003): 93-118.
- Ivakhiv, Adrian. "Nature and ethnicity in East European paganism: an environmental ethic of the religious right?." Pomegranate 7, no. 2 (2005).
- Ivakhiv, Adrian. "In Search of Deeper Identities Neopaganism and" Native Faith" in Contemporary Ukraine." Nova Religio 8, no. 3 (2005): 7-38.
- Ivakhiv, Adrian. "Colouring Cape Breton: 'Celtic' Topographies of Culture and Identity in Cape Breton Island." Ethnologies 27, no. 2 (2005): 107-136.
- Ivakhiv, Adrian. "Stoking the heart of (a certain) Europe: Crafting hybrid identities in the Ukraine-EU borderlands." Spaces of Identity 6, no. 1 (2006): 11-44.
- Ivakhiv, Adrian. "Toward a geography of "religion": Mapping the distribution of an unstable signifier." Annals of the Association of American Geographers 96, no. 1 (2006): 169-175.
- Ivakhiv, Adrian. "Green film criticism and its futures." Interdisciplinary Studies in Literature and Environment 15, no. 2 (2008): 1-28.
- Ivakhiv, Adrian. "Stirring the geopolitical unconscious: Towards a Jamesonian ecocriticism." New Formations 64 (2008): 98-110.
- Ivakhiv, Adrian. "From frames to resonance machines: The neuropolitics of environmental communication" Environmental Communication 4, no. 1 (2010): 109-121.
- Ivakhiv, Adrian J. "The anthrobiogeomorphic machine: Stalking the zone of cinema." Film-Philosophy 15, no. 1 (2011): 118-139.
- Ivakhiv, Adrian. "Green pilgrimage: Problems and prospects for ecology and peace-building." Pilgrims and Pilgrimages as Peacemakers in Christianity, Judaism and Islam, ed. C. A. González Paz (Ashgate, 2012), 85-103.
- Ivakhiv, Adrian. "Chernobyl, Risk, and the Inter-Zone of the Anthropocene." The Routledge Companion to Media and Risk, ed. B. Ghosh and B. Sarkar (Routledge, 2000), 219-232.
