= Viktor Kryzhanivskyi =

Ukrainian artist (1950–2016)

- Віктор Крижанівський
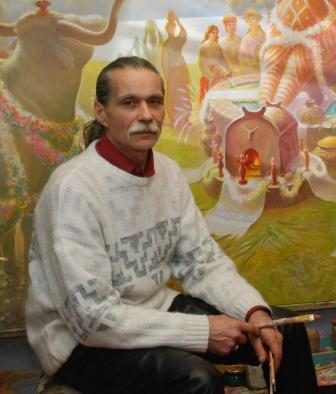
- Born: Viktor Volodymyrovych Kryzhanivskyi; May 12, 1950; Zayachivka, Volyn Oblast, Ukrainian SSR
- Died: July 22, 2016 (aged 66); Kyiv, Ukraine
- Education: Kiev State Institute of Arts
- Known for: Graphics
- Notable work: Series of works: "Slavs", "Touch", "Shevchenko in St. Petersburg, Pages Pereiaslav Council, Volin and others made in techniques of color etching, Monotype, pastels, oils, acrylic during 1983 - 2008rr (total number of works over the years - about one thousand)

Viktor Krizhanivskyi (Ukrainian: Віктор Володимирович Крижанівський; May 12, 1950 – July 22, 2016) was a Ukrainian painter and artist.

In 1982 Kryzhanivskyi graduated from National Academy of Visual Arts and Architecture. At the time of his death he was a lecturer of the Department of Drawing Art of National Academy of Arts and Architecture, a member of the National Union of Artists of Ukraine, a Doctor of Philosophy in Fine Arts (Kingston University) and a participant in municipal, state and international exhibitions. He organized twenty personal exhibitions for 30 years of his creative work. His original works are exhibited in museums in Ukraine as well as in personal collections around the world.

== Biography ==
In 1982, he graduated from the Kyiv State Art Institute.

In 1982, he became a lecturer at the Department of Drawing at the Kyiv State Art Institute.

In 1988, he became a member of the National Union of Artists of Ukraine. In 2007, he became an associate professor at the Department of Drawing at the National Academy of Fine Arts and Architecture.

In 2007, he earned a PhD in Philosophy of Fine Arts from Kingston University. On March 11, 2013, Kryzhanivsky was one of the speakers at the conference on "War against Ukrainian History and Culture," which was held by UNIAN.

In 2015, he participated in the program "Secret Front" on the "ICTV" channel, speaking in support of the authenticity of the Book of Veles.

== Death ==
On July 21, 2016, he was found in his apartment in Kyiv with a knife wound, from which he died shortly thereafter.
