= Halyna Lozko =

Ukrainian neopagan leader and scholar

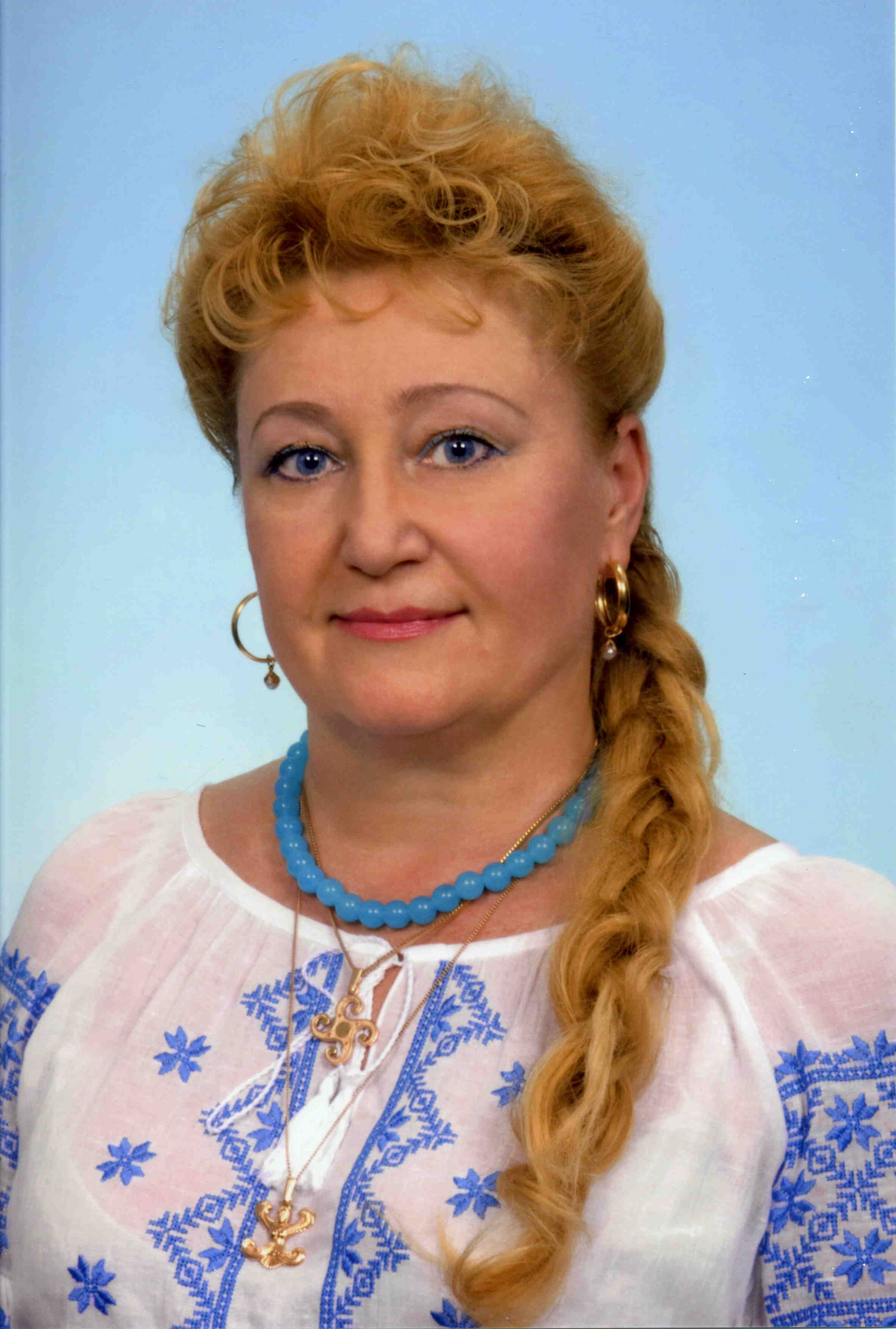
- Halyna Lozko in 2011
- Born: 3 February 1952 (age 74); Yelanets, Mykolaiv Oblast, Soviet Union
- Occupations: ethnologist, volkhv

Halyna Lozko (Ukrainian: Галина Сергіївна Лозко) (née Yelanets, Ukrainian: Єланець, b. 3 February 1952 in Mykolaiv Oblast) is a Ukrainian ethnologist, theologian and neopagan leader. In 1993 she founded the group Pravoslavia in Kyiv, which adheres to Slavic Native Faith in the tradition established by Volodymyr Shaian. Lozko also co-founded the Native Faith Association of Ukraine (Ukrainian: „Об'єднання Рідновірів України“, ORU), founded in 1998 and registered on 24 May 2001.

== Biography ==
=== Early life ===
Halyna Lozko was born in Yelanets, Mykolaiv Oblast, on 3 February 1952.

=== Education and academic career ===
- 1969. – Kyiv high school No. 140.
- 1977. – Faculty of Philology of Taras Shevchenko National University of Kyiv department of Philology, teacher of Ukrainian language and literature.
- 1996. – PhD candidacy – Department of Religious studies of Institute of Philosophy of Ukrainian National Academy of Sciences (Ukrainian: Інститут філософії ім. Г.Сковороди НАН України); thesis topic: "Ukrainian paganism as a source for domestic religious syncretism" (Ukrainian: „Українське язичництво як джерело побутового релігійного синкретизму“) (specialization 09.00.11 – religious studies).
- 2007. – PhD of Philosophy – Department of Religious studies of Faculty of Philosophy of Taras Shevchenko National University of Kyiv; thesis topic: "Actualization of Ukrainian ethnic religion in European context" (Ukrainian: „Актуалізація української етнорелігії в европейському контексті“) (specialization 09.00.12 – Ukrainian studies).

She is currently employed at Borys Grinchenko Kyiv University.

=== Pagan revivalism ===
In 1993, Lozko founded the Kyiv-based Slavic Native Faith group Pravoslavia. This was Ukraine's first post-Soviet neopagan organization in the polytheistic tradition that first had been established in the interwar period by Volodymyr Shaian (1908 – 1974). During the Cold War, Ukrainian Native Faith had mainly been carried on by the Ukrainian diaspora in the West, and Lozko was initiated by Myroslav Sytnyk in Hamilton, Canada. She has also launched projects such as the Svitovyd Center for the Rebirth of Ukrainian Culture, the School of the Native Faith, the Museum of the Book of Veles (1996–1998) and the journal Svaroh. She co-founded the Native Faith Association of Ukraine (Об'єднання Рідновірів Україн, ORU) in 1998, to coordinate activities between different local groups. ORU was officially registered as a pagan religious organization in 2001. It has made an effort to establish a comprehensive system for regular calendar ritualism. It has also been active in the neopagan interfaith activities of the European Congress of Ethnic Religions.

== Publications (in Ukrainian) ==
- Лозко Г. Українське язичництво., Київ, Український центр духовної культури, 1994.
- Лозко Г. Волховник., Київ, Український центр духовної культури, 1994.
- Лозко Г. Правослов. Молитви до Рідних Богів, Київ, НКТ «Світовид», 1995.
- Лозко Г. Українське народознавство., Київ, Зодіак-ЕКО, 1995.; second extended edition: Київ, АртЕК, 2004.; third edition: Харків, 2005.
- Лозко Г. С. Волховник. Правослов.- Серія: „Пам’ятки релігійної думки України-Русі“, Київ, „Сварог“, 2001.
- Lozko H. Rodzima Wiara Ukrainska (translated to Polish by Anton Vacik), Вроцлав, „Топожел“ (Польща), 1997.
- Лозко Г. Іменослов: імена слов`янські, історичні та міфологічні, Київ, Редакція часопису „Сварог“, 1998.
- Лозко Г. Етнологія України. Філософсько-теоретичний та етнорелігієзнавчий аспект., Київ, АртЕК, 2002.
- Лозко Г. Велесова Книга – волховник (translation, research, original text and dictionary with over 8500 words), Київ, „Такі справи“, 2002.; second edition: Вінниця, „Континент-Прим“, 2004.; third edition 2006., fourth edition 2007.
- Лозко Г. Коло Свароже. Відроджені традиції – Український письменник, Київ, 2004.
- Лозко Г. С. Пробуджена Енея. Європейський етнорелігійний ренесанс, Див, Харків, 2006., ISBN 966-8504-20-8
- Коло Свароже – set of holiday greeting cards with themes from Slavic Rodnovery. Scientific reconstruction Halyna Lozko; painters: Viktor Kryzhanovsky, Petro Kachalaba, Elena Gaydamaka, Київ: „Такі справи“, 2006.
- Лозко Г. С. Рідна читанка. Для середнього шкільного віку – Вінниця, Континент-Прим, 2007.
- more than hundred articles and papers in journals

=== Collaboration on academic and encyclopedic publications ===
- Dictionary of religious terms (Ukrainian: Релігієзнавчий словник), Kyiv, 1996., ISBN 966-529-005-3 (in Ukrainian)
- Little encyclopedia of ethnic state managing (Ukrainian: Мала енциклопедія етнодержавознавства), Kyiv, 1996., ISBN 966-507-016-9 (in Ukrainian)
- History of religions in Ukraine in 10 volumes (Ukrainian: Історія релігій в Україні в 10-ти томах), Kyiv, Ukrainian: Український центр духовної культури, 1996–2004; ISBN 966-7276-36-8 (in Ukrainian)
- Academic religious studies (Ukrainian: Академічне релігієзнавство), Kyiv, 2000., ISBN 966-7742-06-7 (in Ukrainian)
