= Levashovism =

Slavic neopagan religion

Dragon-pronged swastika, a guise which was common in cultures of central Eurasia, emphasised by Nikolay Levashov. It is a symbol of Svarog, that is, the universe itself and especially Svarga, the supreme north pole of Heaven with the rotating constellations of the Small Chariot and the Great Chariot.

Levashovism is a doctrine and healing system of Rodnovery (Slavic neopaganism) that emerged in Russia, formulated by the physics theorist, occultist and psychic healer Nikolay Viktorovich Levashov (1961–2012), one of the most prominent leaders of Slavic Neopaganism after the collapse of the Soviet Union. The movement was incorporated in 2007 as the Russian Public Movement of Renaissance–Golden Age (Russian: Русское Общественное Движение "Возрождение. Золотой Век"; acronym: РОД ВЗВ, ROD VZV). Levashovite doctrine is based on a mathematical cosmology, a melting of science and spirituality which has been compared to a "Pythagorean" worldview, and is pronouncedly eschatological. Levashovism is influenced by Ynglism, especially sharing the latter's historiosophical narrative about the Slavic Aryan past of the Russians, and like Ynglism it has been formally rejected by mainstream Russian Rodnover organisations. The movement is present in many regions of Russia, as well as in Ukraine, Belarus, Romania, Moldova and Finland.

== Overview ==
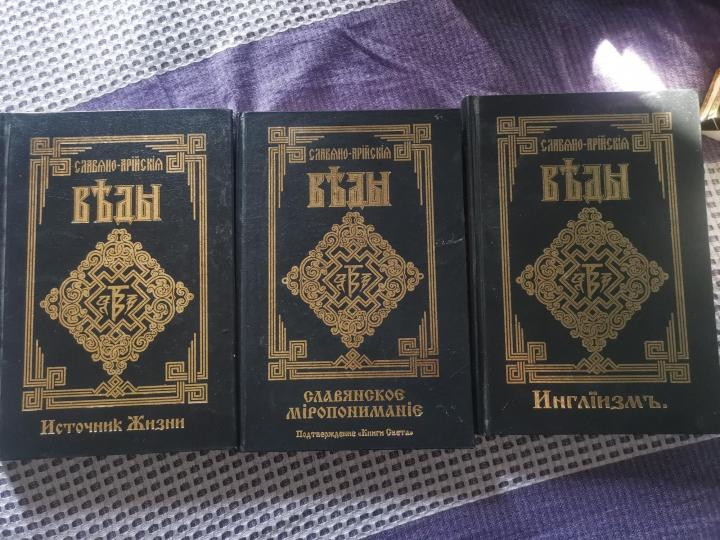
Three of the Slavo-Aryan Vedas

Nikolay V. Levashov was educated in advanced physics and quantum mechanics. He began to practise psychic healing in Russia in the 1980s, and in 1990–1991 he held seminars on the subject. In 1991 he moved to California, in the United States, where he lived until 2006 and where he wrote his main books. In 2006 he returned to Russia where in 2007 he founded the Russian Public Movement of Renaissance–Golden Age, formally incorporating the movement of his followers. A few months before dying, Levashov ran for the 2012 Russian presidential election.

Levashov claimed to be a bearer of genuine "Vedic" sacred knowledge of the "Slavic Aryans", and called on his followers to live in rational harmony with nature following the path of evolution represented by ancient Vedic culture. Levashovism is based on the Book of Veles and on the Slavo-Aryan Vedas first popularised by the Ynglist Church in the 1990s; Levashov reworked the teachings of these books into original publications, including some—such as The Tale of the Bright Falcon—presenting such teachings in the style of the Russian fairy tale. Levashov referred to the Slavo-Aryan Vedas as carriers of the "innermost knowledge of the first ancestors".

The Levashovite worldview has been likened to Pythagoreanism by Barbara G. Koopman and Richard A. Blasband, for its being "a rare meld of science and spirituality". However, Levashovism, together with Ynglism, was condemned in a joint statement issued in 2009 by the major Russian organisations of mainstream Rodnovery, which deemed it a non-genuine doctrine detrimental to the whole Rodnover movement.

== Beliefs ==
=== Cosmology of Svarog ===
Representation of the theo-cosmology of Levashovism, showing the seven primary matters pouring from the Chariots of the north pole of the sky

According to Levashovite doctrine, all the universe is living matter in quantised space. The universe, all universal creation itself, is the visible manifestation of the absolute God, Rod (Род); this visible manifestation is Svarog (Сварог), the supernal God in the heights of Heaven—Svarga—, the abode of the gods—Asgard—, and the Slavic Aryan paradise—Iriy—, which correspond to the north celestial pole and its circumpolar stars, especially the seven-starred constellations of the Bear or Chariot (Ursa Major and Ursa Minor, the Great Chariot and the Small Chariot) at the centre of the zodiac. Svarog and the universal process of creation are represented by the swastika. The universe has three dimensions, Prav, Yav and Nav: Prav, meaning "Right", is the abode of the gods itself, from which all the right laws of nature come from; Yav is the "manifested" world of the living; while Nav is the "unmanifested" world where the dead go before being born again in Yav.

Quantised space is the cradle of all creation and is anisotropic, that is to say non-uniform or non-homogeneous in its architecture, characterised by different qualities and properties in different directions, in which matter interacts in different ways taking different shapes. Qualities and properties of space in its different regions are constantly changing. This view is strongly supported in astrophysics, and is opposed to the classical view according to which the universal space is isotropic, that is to say uniform in its qualities and properties in all directions, in which matter manifests itself in similar ways.

In the Levashovite worldview, anisotropy has a central role in all creation, both microcosmic and macrocosmic; the process of creation unfolds through the eternal interplay, or "cosmic dance", between matter and the anisotropic space, governed by quantifiable parameters. The architectural patterns of any of the regions of space are quantised, and therefore expressible in numerical values. These architectural patterns "actually define and impose the limits within which its chaotically moving matter may exist and the degree of stability it may maintain". The architectures of quantised space, expressible in numerical parameters, are continuously changing, or fluctuating, due to perturbations exerted by electromagnetic waves, both in the microcosmic world of atoms and in the macrocosmic world of stars, and their fluctuations are "responsible for every expression of nature that happens in the universe". Levashov left a mathematical formulation for the representation of the architectural patterns of space.

==== Seven primary matters ====
Based on the presumed ancient Vedic knowledge of the Slavic Aryans, Levashov theorised that matter itself is differentiated into seven types, or "building blocks" of creation, which he called the "seven primary matters" or "seven primordial matters" (семь первичных материй, sem' pervichnykh materiy), conventionally identified by the letters A, B, C, D, E, F and G, and by the seven colours, respectively red, violet, blue, azure, green, yellow and orange. The seven primary matters are nonphysical, or subtle matter, that is to say not perceivable to the ordinary human state of consciousness. Primordially, they move chaotically in space, "ignoring" each other, but each of them has its own distinctive properties or qualities and a specific energetic potential that allow them to respond to the ever-changing patterns of space. Red matter A is the most important, functioning as a structural and energetic foundation for all the other matters when they coalesce to form entities.

Local areas of anisotropy are created by fluctuations in the architectural patterns of space—likened to a stone tossed into water creating ripple effects—and these fluctuations influence the relationship between space itself and the seven primary matters. When the latter find themselves in a given region of space in proportions that match the numerical parameters of that given region of space, the seven building blocks become empowered to interact and coalesce with other blocks of compatible quality and energetic potential to form structures of hybrid matter, providing endless opportunities for cosmic creation. While the fluctuations of space mould the otherwise free-flowing matter within it, simultaneously matter itself generates further fluctuations, engaging in a continuous "cosmic dance" until this dance reaches an equilibrium and creates a stable system.

In other words, when the quantity of change in spatial parameters becomes critical, a quality emerges, as matter coalesces and stable manifestations of reality are created, such as the planet Earth, also called Midgard in Levashovism, borrowing the concept from Germanic Heathenism. Contrariwise, when the balance between the architectural parameters of the surrounding space and the qualities and energetic potential of the seven primary matters within it is broken, the structures of hybrid matter that were formed lose stability and disintegrate, returning to be chaotic matter.

==== Sevenfold bodies ====
Schematic drawing representing the seven primary matters merged into six spheres of hybrid matters in the unhomogeneous constitution of Midgard-Earth's space

According to Levashovite cosmology, when they are organised, the seven primary matters constitute seven "layers" of reality. Each layer is composed of different hybrids of the seven primary matters and they are separated from each other by almost unpenetrable qualitative barriers; for instance, the planet Earth has its physical body—its innermost sphere—, and six other interdigitating nonphysical (invisible) spherical bodies. Any entity and the human being itself is constituted by seven interpenetrating bodies, including the innermost densest physical body and six other bodies of subtler matter, referred to as the "subtle bodies" or "spiritual bodies".

The seven bodies are, from the densest to the subtlest, the physical body, the ethereal body, the astral body, the mental body, and three supramental bodies. Each of them is constituted by different combinations of the seven primary matters, though with a different one of them being dominant in each body, each of them expressing distinctive qualities and characteristics and representing a stair of spiritual evolution; together, they constitute the spirit, or higher consciousness, of an entity. The physical body is constituted by a balance, grounded on red matter A, of all the other matters; the ethereal body is entirely of orange matter G; the astral body is dominated by yellow matter F prevailing on G; the mental body is dominated by green matter E prevailing on F and G; the first supramental body is dominated by azure matter D prevailing on E, F and G; the second supramental body is dominated by blue matter C prevailing on D, E, F and G; and the third supramental body is dominated by violet matter B prevailing on C, D, E, F and G. Orange matter G is present on all levels, as the ethereal body is the first and lowest stage in the evolution of living, conscious entities: the animal consciousness. Each one of the subtle bodies is structurally a copy of the physical body on the corresponding subtle body of the planet Earth. They all possess the same structure—cells, organs, organic systems—corresponding to that of the physical body. Most humans have developed, in addition to the physical body, only the first two subtle bodies, while all the other four are rudimentary and inactive. A human has to develop all the seven bodies to complete the cycle of evolution and break out of the reincarnation cycle on the Earth.

In the Levashovite system, the seven matters dominating in each one of the seven bodies are associated to seven energetic centres in the body—chakras in Hindu terminology—functioning as antennas which convey the associated matter. The coccyx is the centre associated with red matter A, is the fundamental one, and red matter A corresponds to the Kundalini in the Hindu system, the fundamental cosmic force of all creation represented by the snake, which is necessary to awaken and steer for ascending towards the higher levels; the sexual organ is associated with orange matter G; the navel is associated with yellow matter F; the heart is associated with green matter E; the throat is associated with azure matter D; the forehead is associated with blue matter C; and the crown is associated with violet matter B. Levashov's seven matters and seven bodies have been compared to William A. Tiller's cosmological model, itself telling about seven levels of substances interpenetrating each other with minimal interaction until triggered by the mind; Tiller's cosmology itself was inspired by the Hindu system of the seven chakras.

=== Twofold time cycle ===
==== Bright Forces and Dark Forces ====
Belobog ("White God"), represented as a hawk in green matter E of high mental consciousness, and Chernobog ("Black God"), represented as a monster in orange matter G of low animal consciousness. In the Levashovite system, they are other names for the "Bright Forces" and the "Dark Forces", and for Yav and Nav. Between them is the swastika, the Prav law of the supreme north pole of Svarog; it is violet in colour, like matter B of the highest supramental consciousness. Their eyes are red, the colour of the basic matter A. Above them are their corresponding luminaries, respectively Dazhbog ("Sun God") of the day and Jutrobog ("Moon God") of the night.

Levashovite doctrine tells that reality is orchestrated by gods, cosmic forces which can be either creative and life-giving "Bright Forces" (Светлые Силы, Svetlye Sily) or destructive and life-sucking "Dark Forces" (Темные Силы, Temnye Sily). The influence of either Bright Forces or Dark Forces and the behaviour of people, and the manifestation in them of certain qualities and emotions, depend on which one of the seven primary matters prevails in a given configuration of space–matter.

Wherever and whenever—in a given region of space and in the cycle of time—primary matter E dominates, there is a "Day of Svarog" (День Сварога, Den' Svaroga), characterised by the complete development of the third and fourth subtle bodies (the astral and the mental body) of the human being, with the development of consciousness and of high spiritual and moral qualities. Conversely, wherever and whenever primary matter G dominates there is a "Night of Svarog" (Ночь Сварога, Noch' Svaroga), characterised by the hypertrophied development of the second and incomplete third subtle bodies (the ethereal and the lower astral body) of the human being, with a regression of consciousness and the expression of low destructive qualities in human beings (such as aggressiveness, cruelty, greed and envy). During the Nights of Svarog, the Dark Forces get the opportunity to influence people of G quality and through them influence all the Midgard.

While mankind and the Midgard would be fundamentally the expression of the Bright Forces, which are best expressed in history by the Russians or Aryans, some parts of humanity, notably the Jews and the Christians would be, instead, mostly—though unconsciously—prey to the Dark Forces and agents of their will.

==== Eschatology ====
In Levashovite eschatology, the "driving forces of the Apocalypse are rooted in the depths of natural being" itself. Time is a cycle alternating Days of Svarog and Nights of Svarog, depending on the movement of the Solar System in the Milky Way galaxy; the duration of each Day of Svarog and Night of Svarog is uneven, due to the uneven concentrations of the seven primary matters in different regions of the universal space. Levashovite historiosophy fixes the beginning of the latest Night of Svarog in 988 CE, with the official Christianisation of Kievan Rus' orchestrated by Vladimir Sviatoslavich. Otherwise, among Levashovite followers there is no consensus about the dating of the end of the latest Night of Svarog: according to some it ended in the mid or late 1990s, according to others it ended in 2012, and yet others consider the shift from the latest Night of Svarog to the new Day of Svarog to be a gradual transition.

The Russians are called to be the first to wake up, to free themselves from the slavery of the Dark Forces, contributing to the beginning of the new Day of Svarog and to the construction of a new spiritual civilisation different from both Western materialism and Eastern uncritical religiosity. Russia is explained in Levashovite historiosophy as the "Land of the Holy Race" of an ancient "Slavic Aryan Empire", which is said to have only fallen with Pugachev's Rebellion:

The name of the country—Russia, arose from another word—Rasseia, which, in turn, was formed from the name of Rassenia. Rassenia was the name of a part of the ancient Slavic Aryan Empire which lay west of the Riphean Mountains (the Urals). The lands east of the Urals to the Pacific Ocean and further from the Lukomorye (Russian North) to Central India were called the Land of the Holy Race. Foreigners called this country differently. One of the last names known in Europe until the end of the eighteenth century was the Great Tartary.

— Nikolay Levashov, The Hidden History of Russia

== Healing practice ==
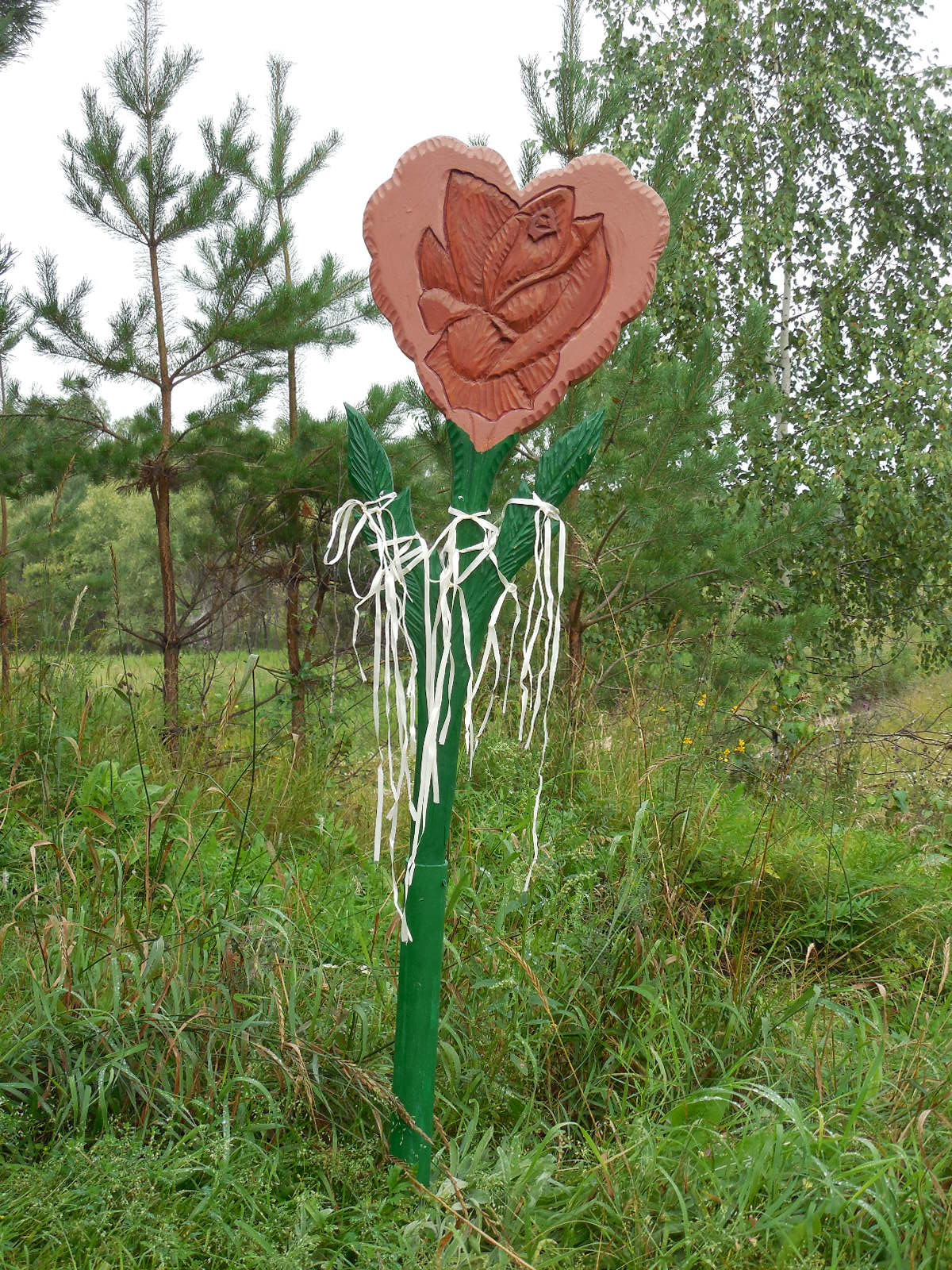
A Rodnover sacred pole representing a rose inside a heart, in Okunevo, Omsk Oblast. In the Levashovite doctrine of the energetic centres of the human body, the heart is the channel of green matter E, which is also the dominant matter in the mental plane.

=== Healer training ===
According to the Levashovites, as fluctuations in the architectural patterns of space dictate everything that happens in the cosmos, from the creation and decay of atoms to the creation and decay of stars, also the entire biogenesis on the Midgard and the development of conscious humanity is determined by them. A Levashovite healer must master the Levashovite cosmological theory, "tune in to the eternal interplay between matter and spatial architecture", be able to "mentally navigate" the seven levels of reality, to "do what nature does": to "orchestrate the creation and dissolution of matter", "choreograph the regeneration and ablation of living matter", for healing purposes all "in accordance with natural law".

To do this, it is necessary that a Levashovite healer has activated their higher subtle bodies and has fully awoken their consciousness; however, in an ordinary person's life it is difficult for this to happen, if unaided, and it is generally a slow and unpredictable process. When this happens, there is a quantum leap in brain potential and psychic ability, and the acquisition of a new thought style free from linear and binary modes, opening to a broader perspective on reality. Sensitivity to the necessary spiritual transformation for becoming a healer varies from person to person; there are those who by genetic endowment are able to evolve almost instantaneously, and those for whom it requires years of preparatory work.

Levashov devised a technique to train would-be healers, providing them with the mental "apparatus" to develop their subtle bodies, increasing their energetic potential, thus becoming able to access and sustain a high state of consciousness and work with the seven primary matters. He created a body of disciples practising and spreading his technique to other neophyte healers. One of the biggest hurdles for the spiritual evolution of a healer is narcissism; if the would-be healer is motivated by a desire of power and self-aggrandisement, the path turns counter-evolutionary and leads to spiritual downfall.

=== Healing treatment ===
Any mental or strictly physical illness is due to a disruption of the harmony between the seven bodies, and the latter may be due to genetic defects, infections, karma and environmental factors. To support their healing purpose, the Levashovite healer has to mobilise the appropriate quantity of energetic potential and the correct quality of primary matter, and influence the architectural patterns of the treated subject's microcosm. The healing work should take place first on the six subtle bodies, in order to influence and transform the denser physical body, since the primary matters from the subtle bodies flow down to the physical level and the structures of the subtle bodies are the architectural templates for the physical body. Healing conducted merely on the physical body may afford palliation but not a complete relief, as pathological organisations remain in place on the subtle levels and eventually reassert themselves on the physical level.

The healing procedure comprises a phase of scanning and detoxification, in which the healer inspects the treated subject, finds the causes of the problem and cleanses the subject's body from the symptoms of the problem. This is followed by a phase of disintegration and regeneration, in which the healer decomposes the sick structure in the subject's subtle bodies into the constituent seven primary matters, and re-sets the numerical parameters of the target's microspace, causing a regeneration of the structure in a healthy form. Finally, the healer restores the homeostasis of the organism, that is to say the harmonious working of all its parts in unison, or the "thermostat" of the energy flow between the brain, the nervous system and the organs, which was disrupted by the illness.

== Symbolism ==
Representation of the Aryan warrior of the Bright Forces slaying the dragon of the Dark Forces. The warrior is dominated by the yellow F, green E, azure D, blue C and violet B matters of the higher astral and mental levels of consciousness, while the dragon is dominated by the orange matter G of the lower ethereal level of consciousness. The spear held by the warrior and transfixing the dragon is of red matter A, and is surmounted by the swastika and by the trefoil.

A symbol used by the Levashovite movement is the swastika, especially in the guise with dragons at the ends of its prongs, which was put on display many times by Nikolay Levashov himself during his conferences, and which he reclaimed as a symbol which gave him the right to discuss about the Slavic Aryan past. According to Levashovite worldview, the swastika—or kolovrat in Slavic language—represents Svarog, the supreme north pole of the sky with its circumpolar stars.

Another symbol used by Levashovites is the representation of a warrior riding a horse while slaying a dragon, featured in the coat of arms of the Renaissance–Golden Age organisation, that is a refashioning of the symbol of Saint George and the Dragon representing, in the reinterpretation given by the Levashovites, the Aryan champion of the Bright Forces triumphing over the Dark Forces. In the coat of arms of the organisation, the warrior slaying the dragon is drawn over a trefoil or fleur-de-lys, which according to Levashov represents the "fighting symbol of the Slavic Aryans", with the three petals representing Prav, Yav and Nav.

== Sociology ==
=== Relations with other religions ===
Levashovism strongly refutes the Abrahamic religions and Christianity in particular, deeming its official adoption in Kievan Rus' in 988 CE as the beginning of the latest Night of Svarog of Levashovite cyclical eschatology. Christians are deemed responsible for destroying ancient chronicles about the true history of the Russians. The writings of Levashov also contain more general antisemitic theories. According to Levashovite doctrine, the world is dominated by Bright Forces and Dark Forces; the Jews, the Christians—especially ministers of the churches—some politicians, and any other entity exerting some kind of control over the populations, would be unconscious slaves of the Dark Forces and vehicles for the latter's will to dominate all Midgard.

In turn, Levashovism is rejected by other movements of Rodnovery; in 2009, two among the largest Russian Rodnover organisations, namely the Union of Slavic Native Belief Communities and the Circle of Pagan Tradition, issued a joint statement which deemed Levashovite doctrines as "pseudo-Pagan teachings, pseudo-linguistics, pseudo-science, and outright speculations" harmful to the development of the mainstream movement of Rodnovery.

=== Organisation and controversies ===
The organisation of the Russian Public Movement of Renaissance–Golden Age was described by Natalya V. Prokopyuk as having a "wide public life", producing films, holding meetings, courses and seminars, holding conferences in schools and colleges, and printing newspapers including VeRa and RuAN. The purposes of the organisation, as expressed in its official documents, are:

- Awakening the genetic memory of the Russian people and of the other indigenous peoples living in the territory of modern Russia;
- Restoring the truth about the glorious past of these peoples, and about their role in the creation of a highly developed earthly civilisation;
- Showing these peoples the way of evolution out of the dead-end to which they were led by the Dark Forces;
- Saving civilisation, the planet Earth, and the universe.

Two among the books written by Nikolay Levashov have been banned as extremist in some regions of Russia: Russia in Distorted Mirrors (Россия в Кривых Зеркалах) was banned in 2010 by the Obninsk City Court, while the collection of articles Abilities of Mind (Возможности Разума) was banned in 2013 by the Omsk District Court, a decision later appealed but upheld in 2014 by the Omsk Regional Court. In 2014, a Levashovite follower in Yuzhno-Sakhalinsk, in the Sakhalin Oblast of the Russian Far East, opened fire on the parishioners of the city's Cathedral of the Resurrection of Christ, after which six people were wounded and two were killed—a nun and a local parishioner.

== Levashovite texts ==
1. The Final Appeal to Mankind (Последнее Обращение к Человечеству), 1994
2. The Anisotropic Universe (Неоднородная Вселенная), 2002
3. Spirit and Mind. Volume 1 (Сущность и Разум. Том 1), 1999
4. Spirit and Mind. Volume 2 (Сущность и Разум. Том 2), 2003
5. Abilities of Mind (Возможности Разума), 2006
6. Russian History Viewed through Distorted Mirrors (Россия в Кривых Зеркалах), 2007
7. The Mirror of my Soul. Volume 1 (Зеркало моей Души. Том 1), 2006
8. The Mirror of my Soul. Volume 2 (Зеркало моей Души. Том 2), 2008
9. The Tale of the Bright Falcon (Сказ о Ясном Соколе), 2011
10. Revelation (Откровение), 2010, by Levashov's wife Svetlana Levashova

== See also ==
- Rodnovery
  - Anastasianism
  - Ivanovism
  - Russian Authentism
  - Ynglism
- Germanic Heathenry
- Shamanism
