= Ynglism =

Branch of Rodnovery

The symbol of Ynglism as a body of religious believers (church). It represents Yngly, the fiery radiance, word and action of the supreme God begetting and ordering the universe, as the spinning astral images of the northern culmen of the sky (Iriy or Svarga, "Heaven"). (Note: Hooked cross (swastika) symbols represent the Ynglia, personified as Yngly, the ordered word and action of the supreme God, the fiery radiance which orders the universe. Various hooked cross patterns represent the various forms of life which are generated by this supreme order (the patterns of the gods of planets, earthly weather phenomena, classes of entities, and so on). Besides the hooked cross, the nine-pointed "star of Yngly" (звезда Инглии, zvezda Yngly) is used as a symbol of Ynglism as a doctrine (its theology and cosmology). The star of Yngly is also called oberezhnik (обережник, symbol of the "guardian") and mati-gotka (мати-готка, "ready mother") in popular tradition, referring to matter ready to be ordained by the divine force. The Ynglia itself is often represented at the centre the star as a hooked cross, a thunder (Perun) or as a sword. The star of Yngly also represents the harmonised man (Aryan). The three intersecting triangles represent the three worlds of traditional Slavic cosmology (Prav, Yav and Nav), but also spirit, body and soul on the human plane. The circle surrounding the triangles represents the Ynglia itself, and also human consciousness awakened by the cognition of Yngly, while the infinite space beyond the circle is God's infinite potentiality. The three triangles also represent the elements of earth, water and fire, while the circle represents air and the infinite space beyond it represents the infinite Heaven (Svarga).)

Oberezhnik

Ynglism (Russian: Инглии́зм; Ynglist runes:), (Note: Also spelt Yngliism or Ingl(i)ism.) institutionally the Ancient Russian Ynglist Church of the Orthodox Old Believers–Ynglings (Древнерусская Инглиистическая Церковь Православных Староверов–Инглингов, Drevnerusskaya Ingliisticheskaya Tserkov' Pravoslavnykh Staroverov–Inglingov), is a white nationalist branch of Slavic paganism formally established in 1992 by Aleksandr Yuryevich Khinevich (b. 1961) in Omsk, Russia, and legally recognised by the Russian state in 1998, although the movement was already in existence in unorganised forms since the 1980s. The adherents of Ynglism call themselves "Orthodox", "Old Believers", "Ynglings" or "Ynglists".

The Ynglist Church was described by some scholars as having a complex and well-defined doctrine and liturgy, an authoritative leading hierarchy, and as focusing on esoteric teachings. The Ynglists regard themselves as preserving the true, orthodox (i.e. in accordance with the universal order, right), religious tradition of the Russians, of all Slavs, and of all white European "Aryans". Other modern pagan groups in Russia are strongly critical of Ynglism; at a veche of Russian Rodnover organisations Ynglist doctrines were formally rejected. In the mid 2000s the church faced judicial prosecutions for ethnic hatred and Khinevich himself was convicted with probation between 2009 and 2011. After the central organisation in Omsk was dissolved, the movement proliferated into multiple groups in all the regions of Russia, and also in various countries of Europe and North America. The holy writings of Ynglism are the four Slavo-Aryan Vedas.

== Overview ==
=== Terminology ===
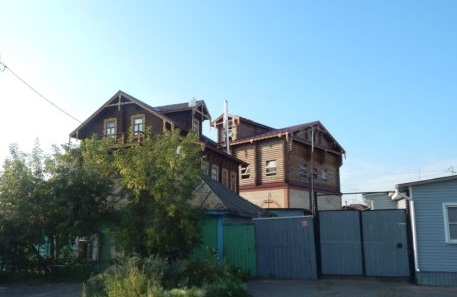
The headquarters of the Ynglist Church in Omsk, in 2016, including the residence of Aleksandr Khinevich in the foreground and the Temple of the Wisdom of Perun (Капище Веды Перуна) in the background

The term "Ynglism" refers to the Ynglings, one of the early Germanic royal families, whom Ynglists believe to be descendants of the Aryan race who originated from the Omsk region of Western Siberia, Russia. This narrative runs contrary to the leading scholarly consensus of the homeland of the historical Proto-Indo-Europeans. According to the Ynglists, the term has cosmological significance, referring to the order of the universe carried by the primordial fiery radiance — the Ynglia, personified as Yngly — emanated by the supreme God, Ra-M-Kha. They also call their religion "Orthodoxy" and "Old Belief".

According to Ynglist history and terminology, the Slavic term for "Orthodoxy", Pravoslavie (Православие, that like the Greek counterpart precisely means "right honouring", or "honouring" [slavit'] the "truth, order" [Prav]), is older than Christianity. The term, which means the right way of living in accordance with the law of the universe, was appropriated by Eastern Orthodox Christianity among the Slavs only by the 17th century, through the reforms of Patriarch Nikon of Moscow, in order to wholly absorb the indigenous religion which was then still prevalent among the population. Prior to the reform, Christianity used the Greek-based loanword Ortodoksalnost (Ортодоксальность). The term "Russian" and related ones would derive instead from the Aryan root ros (рос), referring to "brightness" and "holiness".

The definition "Old Believers" (Староверы, Starovery), which today is employed to refer to Christians who preserved pre-Nikonian rituals, who are more correctly called the "Old Ritualists" (Старообрядцы, Staroobryadtsy), was imposed on the latter during the same Nikonian reform. Their previous name was "Righteous Christians" (Праведные Христиане, Pravednye Khristiane), and "Old Believers" referred instead to indigenous Slavic religion. According to the Ynglists, these theories would be proven by 13th-century documents preserved by a sect of the Christian Old Believers.

=== Characteristics ===
Aleksandr Y. Khinevich (b. 1961) is a native of Omsk and graduated from the Omsk State Technical University. He began to give an organisation to Ynglism between the 1980s and the early 1990, starting from the community Dzhiva-Astra (Джива-Астра) which practised exorcism and traditional medicine, and formally founded the Ynglist Church in 1992, in Omsk. In the same year he published a book entitled Ynglism, Short Course, in which he put forward the backbone of his doctrine, and he visited the United States where he claimed to have established branch groups of the Ynglist Church. Later in the 1990s he published the Slavo-Aryan Vedas, the fundamental books of Ynglism. As the head of the Ynglist Church he is known by his followers as Pater Diy (Патер Дий, meaning "Divine Father" or "Shining Father"), or volkhv Kolovrat. He does not qualify Ynglism either as a "paganism" or as a "religion", but rather as a "cosmic wisdom" brought by the Aryans, and preserved since ancient times in the region of Western Siberia. The scholar Elena Golovneva argued that it is accurate to classify Ynglism a "new religious movement", or an "invented tradition", which nonetheless contains elements drawn from very old sources. Scholars have identified influences from Hinduism, Zoroastrianism, Helena Blavatsky's Theosophy, and German Ariosophy within Ynglism. The scholars Alexey V. Gaidukov and Kaarina Aitamurto described Ynglism as a movement focused on esotericism, with an authoritative leading hierarchy and a well-defined doctrine and liturgy.

In the 1990s Khinevich had in all likelihood an acquaintance with Viktor Bezverkhy (1930–2000), the founder and major ideologist of Peterburgian Vedism. Khinevich would have been granted the title of "honorary Wend" by the Union of Wends, the Rodnover organisation founded by Bezverkhy in 1990. Although there was not a full-fledged cooperation with the Peterburgian Vedists, and they never accepted the Slavo-Aryan Vedas of Ynglism, Khinevich reportedly took inspiration from Peterburgian Vedism and reprinted many materials of the Union of Wends. In the 2000s, Nikolay Viktorovich Levashov (1961–2012), after having elaborated his own teachings widely based upon Ynglism, established another organised Rodnover current, Levashovism, which recognises the Slavo-Aryan Vedas as its fundamental sources.

The scholar Polina P. Kocheganova noted that the "cosmic religion" proposed by Ynglism may be regarded as a "modernist" approach to Rodnovery, different from other currents which represent a "traditionalist" approach. Similarly, Gaidukov defined Ynglism as an eclectic or "polysyncratic" (i.e. mixing together elements from different sources) form of Rodnovery. For its characteristics, Ynglism is not regarded as genuine Rodnovery by some other Rodnover groups; in 2009, two of the largest Russian Rodnover organisations, the Union of Slavic Native Belief Communities and the Circle of Pagan Tradition, issued a joint statement against Ynglism, Levashovism, and the doctrines of other authors, deeming them "pseudo-Pagan teachings, pseudo-linguistics, pseudo-science and outright speculation." Kocheganova observed that, however, also the teachings of those Rodnover groups which criticised Ynglism are based on hypotheses about ancient Slavic religion.

=== Writings and authors ===
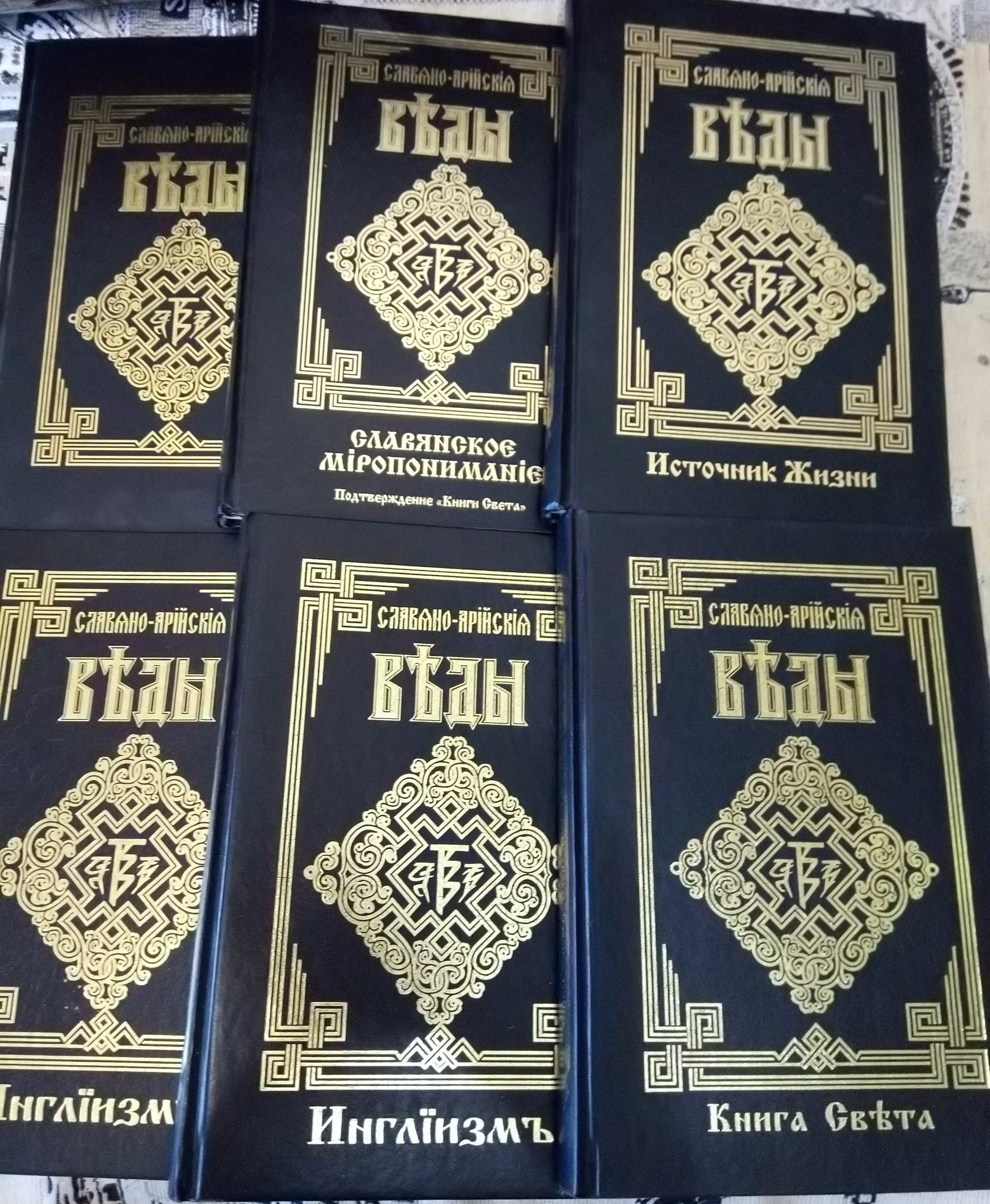
Three of the canonical Slavo-Aryan Vedas, the Book of Light, two copies of Ynglism, and the Source of Life, plus the non-canonical Slavic Worldview

The central holy writings of the Ynglist movement are the Slavo-Aryan Vedas (Славяно-Арийские Веды, Slavyano-Ariyskiye Vedy), purportedly ancient texts allegedly passed down generation by generation in Western Siberia, whose most ancient parts would be tens of thousands of years old. They were allegedly originally written on santy (сантии, сантьи, саньтии), tablets made of noble metals, which would now be kept in a secret location by the high priests of Ynglism and would contain texts composed of 186,000 "Slavic Aryan runes", first transliterated into Cyrillic script and printed on paper in 1944. Four hundred Dacian golden copies of the original Siberian tablets are claimed to have been discovered in 1875 at the Sinaia Monastery in the Bucegi Mountains, Romania, and handed over to the king Carol I of Romania, of the Hohenzollern-Sigmaringen family, who ordered to recopy them in lead before melting most of the golden ones to replenish the royal treasury; known as the "Dacian Santies", they would be preserved in various private vaults and museums of Romania. The Vedas were effectively published by Aleksandr Khinevich since the mid 1990s, and were preceded in 1992 by the book Ynglism, Short Course in which Khinevich put forward the core of his doctrine. The Ynglists claim that the Scandinavian Eddas are a western European Latinised version of their ancient Vedas.

The first Veda comprises the Book of the Wisdom of Perun (Сантии Веды Перуна, Santy Vedy Peruna; also translated as Книга Мудрости Перуна, Kniga Mudrosti Peruna) and the Saga ob Inglingakh, a Russian version of the Old Norse Ynglinga saga. The second Veda comprises the Book of Light (Книга Света, Kniga Sveta) and the first part of the Word of Wisdom of the Wise Velimudra (Слово Мудрости Волхва Велимудра, Slovo Mudrosti Volkhva Velimudra). The third Veda comprises the Ynglism, the Ancient Faith of Slavic and Aryan Folks (Инглиiзмъ, Древняя Вера Славянскихъ и Арiйскихъ Народовъ; Ingliizm, Drevnyaya Vera Slavyanskikh i Ariyskikh Narodov) and the second part of the Word of Wisdom. The fourth and last Veda of Ynglism contains the Source of Life (Источник Жизни, Istochnik Zhizni) and the White Way (Белый Путь, Bely Put). A fifth book, though not part of the canonical Vedas, is Slavic Worldview, Confirmation of the Book of Light (Славянское Мiропонiмание, Подтверждение Книги Света; Slavyanskoye Miroponimaniye, Podtverzhdeniye Knigi Sveta). After they were published by Khinevich, the Ynglist Vedas were sold in many thousands of copies. According to Golovneva, such popularity of the books proves that they are "far from being marginal", as they represent "the basis for a certain kind of popular knowledge of ancient history".

Besides their Vedas, the Ynglists also rely upon the Book of Veles, and also upon various Gnostic scriptures, including the Secret Gospel of John and the New Testament of the Holy Apostle Thomas discovered in 1945. Apart from Aleksandr Khinevich, another important Russian author of Ynglist literature is Aleksey V. Trekhlebov (volkhv Vedagor), one of the earliest and closest disciples of the former. Trekhlebov came from the study of Indian religions, and he is a yogi; he claimed to have received initiation in Nepal from a high lama, who advised him to seek the truth in his own native traditions. He has dedicated his life to the "spiritual and moral education of the Slavs, the spiritual revival of the Russians towards mental health and enlightenment"; for this purpose, he has written various Ynglist books, including The Blasphemers of Finist the Bright Falcon (Кощуны Финиста Ясного Сокола, Koshchuny Finista Yasnogo Sokola). In Ukraine, a notable spreader of Ynglist ideas was Volodymyr Kurovskyi, who contributed to the making of the documentary Igra Bogov ("Play of Gods").

== Beliefs ==
The name of the supreme transcendental God, Ra-M-Kha, in stylised Ynglist runic writing

According to the Ynglists, their beliefs represent the original religion of the Aryan race, which was preserved in the purest and most detailed forms by the Slavs and the Iranians, while the Indo-Aryans who migrated into the Indian subcontinent mixed with native Indians and corrupted the original Vedic doctrines. According to the prolific Ynglist writer Aleksey Trekhlebov, one of the closest disciples of Aleksandr Khinevich, the Slavic tradition offers three postulates for knowing truth: word (slovo), vision (vedy) and experience (opyt). It is therefore open to a certain degree of personal gnosiology: in estimating the validity of a given truth a person should listen the opinion of his spiritual teacher, read what the Slavo-Aryan Vedas say about it, and ponder whether it seems reasonable in the light of his own experience.

The scholar Victor Shnirelman observed that the Ynglist doctrine owes much to Slavic, Germanic, Iranian and Indian sources, but integrates gods and concepts from other cultures as well. For instance, Ynglist beliefs include the idea of reincarnation matching that of Hinduism, and the idea of a struggle between good and evil forces matching that of Zoroastrianism. The scholar Robert A. Saunders described Ynglist doctrine as influenced by late nineteenth and early twentieth-century German Ariosophy. The Ynglists themselves believe that their doctrine systematises ideas already contained in the original "Russian spiritual culture", and that it would be the way for saving mankind from degeneration.

=== Theology ===
Scheme of the theology of Omskian Ynglism: Ra-M-Kha begets Ynglia-Yngly, which begets Rod, from which depart the four ramifications of the Slavo-Aryans.

Shnirelman described Ynglist theology as esoteric, and, citing the words of Aleksandr Khinevich himself, as "neither monotheistic nor polytheistic" as were the beliefs of the "early ancestors" — the Aryan race, whom Khinevich calls the "Slavo-Aryans". Ynglist theology is monistic: all the deities of nature and the entities that they generate are regarded as the manifestations of the energy emanated by the supreme universal God. According to Ynglist sources, Ynglist theology and Slavic spirituality in general may be defined as a "rodotheism", that is to say a "worship of the gods of the kins" which links mankind back to the supreme God of the universe, which is the supreme ancestor of the universe itself.

==== The utmost God and its order ====
According to Ynglist theology, the Ynglia (Инглия; Ynglist rune:), called Yngly when personified (Ингли, Инглъ; cf. the Germanic Yng, Yngwi, whose Scandinavian runic consists of square symbols →, and cf. the Germanic suffix "-ing", implying the action of generation and production) is the structural order of the universe and of all phenomena, characterised as a fiery radiance emanated by the supreme God, the "One Indivisible God" (Единый Неделимый Бог, Yediny Nedelimy Bog), named Ra-M-Kha (Ра-М-Ха; Ynglist runes:) in Ynglist terminology. Ra-M-Kha is absolute, unknowable, unfathomable, and yet manifests itself as the gods generating all phenomena in accordance with the supreme order, the Ynglia. The latter is personified as Yngly, the intelligence of God, keeper of the source of the fire of the universe, and model of the earliest progenitor of humanity, Rod. Yngly-Ynglia is represented by the swastika symbol, which Ynglists call the "image of Yngly" and consider the first written symbol of humanity, as well as the symbol for the "defense of the native land and of the holy faith".

Apart from the similarity of the names of the Ynglist Ra-M-Kha and the Indian Brahman, Brahma, and Rama, Ra-M-Kha is also identified with the ancient Egyptian concept of Ra central to the other Russian Rodnover movement of Vseyasvetnaya Gramota (the "Universal Script"). Alexey Gaidukov observed that the Ynglist name for the supreme God is also similar to that of Ramtha, the entity allegedly channelled by the American New Ager J. Z. Knight.

A hymn to Ra-M-Kha declaims:

Great Ra-M-Kha, one supreme creator, you are the one giving life to all worlds! We glorify you, generator of everything from small to great, in our temples and sanctuaries, in our settlements and graveyards, in our cities and villages, in our holy groves and in our oaks, on the banks of our holy rivers and lakes; for the holy Ynglia, which brings us the light of love and joy, and illuminates our hearts and thoughts. May all our deeds be done, in your glory, now and ever from circle to circle.

A hymn to Yngly declaims:

Great god Yngly, keeper of the holy Ynglia! Hallow and warm our souls and our hearts, our temples and dwellings, do not leave our kins unattended, now and ever from circle to circle.

==== The gods of nature ====
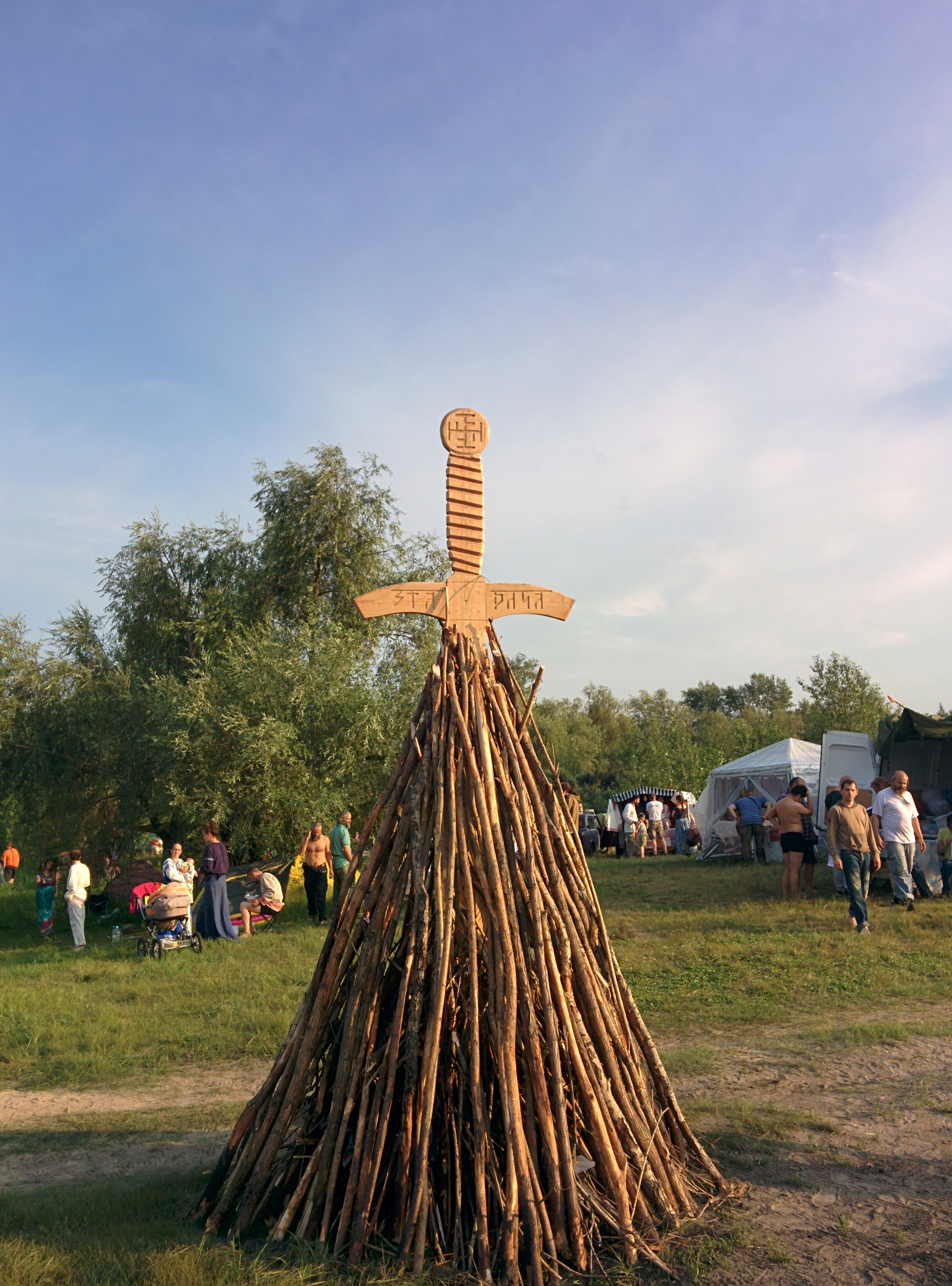
Sword in brushwood prepared for worshipping Perun by Ynglists in Omsk; note the inscription in Ynglist runes on the sword's crossguard. According to the scholar Richard Foltz, the ritual of swords planted in piles of stones or brushwood has Scythian origins, and honoured the martial deity, and even the British Arthurian legend of the sword in the stone is an echo of this cult, which was brought to Britain by Alan (i.e. "Aryan" through a consonant shift; the name of Sarmatian tribes from the first century onwards) regiments settled there by the Romans during the first century CE.

In Ynglist theology, below Ra-M-Kha and Yngly, and in the matrix into which the energy of Yngly becomes incarnated — the Earth, also called Midgard ("Middle-Realm") by the Ynglists according to Scandinavian terminology —, there are Rod — the archetype of humanity, progenitor of all the ancestors — and the multitude of the gods of nature. These gods are described as immutable, informational personal laws who harmoniously generate the different forms of life in the universe and support them in their course. They are all in accordance with the order (the Ynglia) begotten by the supreme God, but at the same time they may exceptionally intervene in the course of phenomena helping the spiritual evolution of mankind along the right path, if people are motivated by sincere creativity and love. An Ynglist dictum is that "the gods are our fathers, and we are their children". In other words, the gods are the progenitors, ancestors of all entities.

The Ynglists distinguish four categories of gods:

1. "Highest Gods" (Вышние Боги, Vyshniye Bogi), those orchestrating the deepest processes of the universe.
2. "Protector Gods" (Боги-Покровители, Bogi-Pokroviteli), those patronising the celestial bodies, the stars and planets, the Earth, the Moon as well as the "Rods", the progenitors of human lineages of the bright Aryan "great race".
3. "Governor Gods" (Боги-Управители, Bogi-Upraviteli), who control various elements, desires, the measured flows of life on Earth.
4. "Guardian Gods" (Боги-Охранители, Bogi-Okhraniteli), who influence various locations on Earth, such as arable lands, forests and the countries of the Aryans.

In the hierarchy of the Highest Gods there are: Vyshen (Вышень, Slavicised Vishnu), Kryshen (Крышень, Slavicised Krishna) and Svarog — the ecliptic north pole; Perun, Indra and Simargl — the celestial north pole, Iriy or Svarga; Dazhbog — the Sun; Chislobog — the great year or great time; Svetovid and Ramkhat — the year; Dzhiva and Marena — life and death; Veles — the patron of the Earth; Mokosh and Lada — aspects of the Earth; Rod and Rozhana — male and female progenitors of human kins. In the hierarchy of divinity, gods act in triads, Triglavs, of which the main one is Svarog-Perun-Svetovid, representing conscience, freedom and light. On the level of the cycle of the Sun, Yngly manifests itself as the eight gods who govern the eight phases of the year: Kolyada, Veles, Lelya, Yarilo, Kupalo, Perun, Mokosh and Marena.

In their incarnated form, materially functioning as progenitors of genealogical lineages, the gods of the northern polar astral planes, especially of the Svarga, are known as "Ases" (Асов, Asov) and they are believed by the Ynglists to be the forefathers of the four ramifications of the Slavo-Aryans: Da'Aryans (Да'Арийцы), Kh'Aryans (Х'Арийцы), Rassenians (Расены) and Svyatorussians (Святорусы).

"Rod-Forefather" (Род-Породитель, Rod-Poroditel; Ynglist runes:; also translatable as "Kin-Progenitor") is the archetype of all the progenitors of the genealogical lineages, and is described as one and the same with Ra-M-Kha, through Yngly. He is without image, like Ra-M-Kha, but Ynglists worship him through the symbol of Ra-M-Kha constituted by the three runes of its name. The protection of Rod flows through Prav, Yav and Nav, the three worlds of traditional Slavic cosmology.

A hymn to Rod-Forefather declaims:

Our great forefather Rod! Listen to those who call you! For you are the eternal source of the life of our gods and of our generations, and therefore we sing glory to you, and day and night we praise you, now and ever from circle to circle.

=== Cosmology ===
Representation of the four dimensions of Ynglist cosmology and of the cycle of life throughout them.

==== Prav, Yav, Nav, and Slav ====
According to Ynglist cosmology, reality consists of three dimensions, recognised by common Rodnover cosmology as well: Prav (Правь, "Right"), Yav (Явь, "Manifested") and Nav (Навь, "Unmanifested"). The Ynglists, however, distinguish a fourth concept defining a part of Nav, that is to say Slav (Славь, "Glory"). Prav is the transcendental, spiritual dimension of the gods, who follow the right law (the Ynglia) of Ra-M-Kha, Yav is the material dimension in which all entities are incarnated, and Nav is the dimension of the soul/movement, which can be Bright Nav (Светлый Навь, Svetly Nav) or Dark Nav (Темный Навь, Temny Nav). The Bright Nav is otherwise called Slav, and is the orderly northern polar Svarga, the dimension of celestial deities, while the Dark Nav is the unorderly deep-space dimension of demons. In the cosmological scheme, the Bright Nav is above while the Dark Nav is below, and Yav is the boundary in-between the two and may develop according to the models of one or the other Nav. Also, Prav is spiritual, supra-mental, while Nav — consisting in the movements of the celestial asterisms — is merely astral if dark but astral and mental if bright (Slav), and Yav is physical, phenomenical.

==== Cycles of life ====
According to the Ynglists the soul of the human being is eternal and undergoes a cyclical journey which begins from the dimension of Prav, where it is identified with the radiance of the utmost God, then passing through the other dimensions of Nav, Yav and Slav, where the soul has to acquire knowledge of darkness in order to objectively recognise light, develop itself according to the bright order of Slav, and finally ascend back to Prav. The soul is created out of the infinite light of God in Prav by Dzhiva, the goddess matrix of life; then, from Prav the soul passes to its own "sovereign star" (звезда-владыка, zvezda-vladyka) in the astral dimension of Nav, especially Slav (the Bright Nav); then, from Nav the soul comes as a stream of light to the physical dimension of Yav on some planet, where it incarnates and develops in matter with the aim of ascending to the mental plane of Slav and ultimately having once again access to Prav. The incarnations are governed by the goddess Karna.

From the matrix of life in Prav, the soul brings with itself throughout the other dimensions the energy and the information — a "figurative structure" — necessary for the completion of its cycles of incarnation; in the material dimension of Yav, the knowledge brought from Prav joins the specialised Rod of a kin, the progenitor deity of a given genealogical lineage, which provides the soul with a compatible body, context and information inherited from the blood of the ancestors, by means of which the soul may improve itself in its given situation, although the soul always has the free will for acquiring new abilities to improve itself towards Slav. The purpose of successive incarnations in different worlds of Yav is to discern between bright ways and dark ways, to act as creators in accordance with the bright order of the utmost God, and to favour the sublimation of matter; if the purpose of a given incarnation in Yav is not fulfilled over the course of a lifetime, Karna makes the soul reincarnate in the same world until the goal has been completed.

=== Historiosophy and eschatology ===
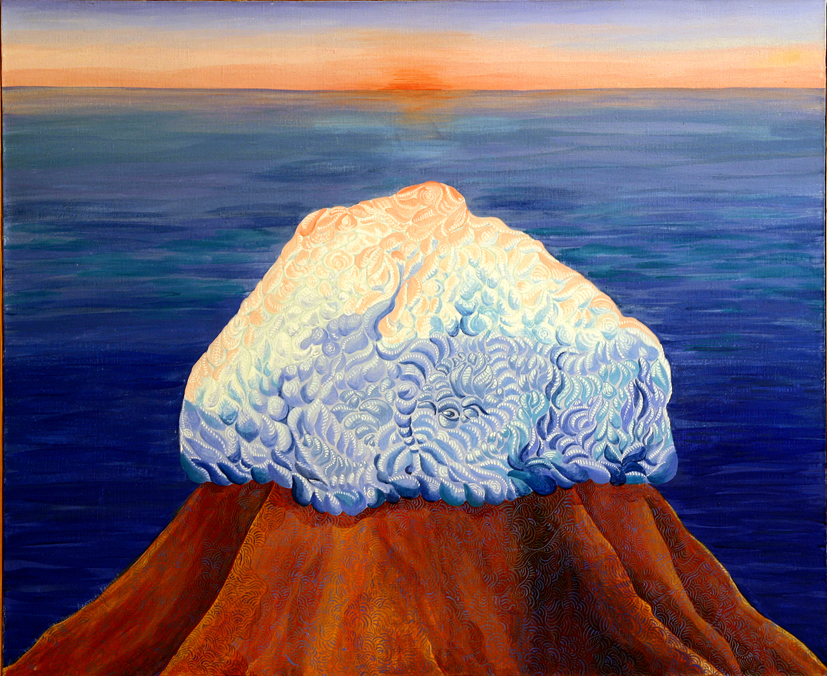
Alatyr Stone, by the Russian artist Lola V. Lonli, 2000

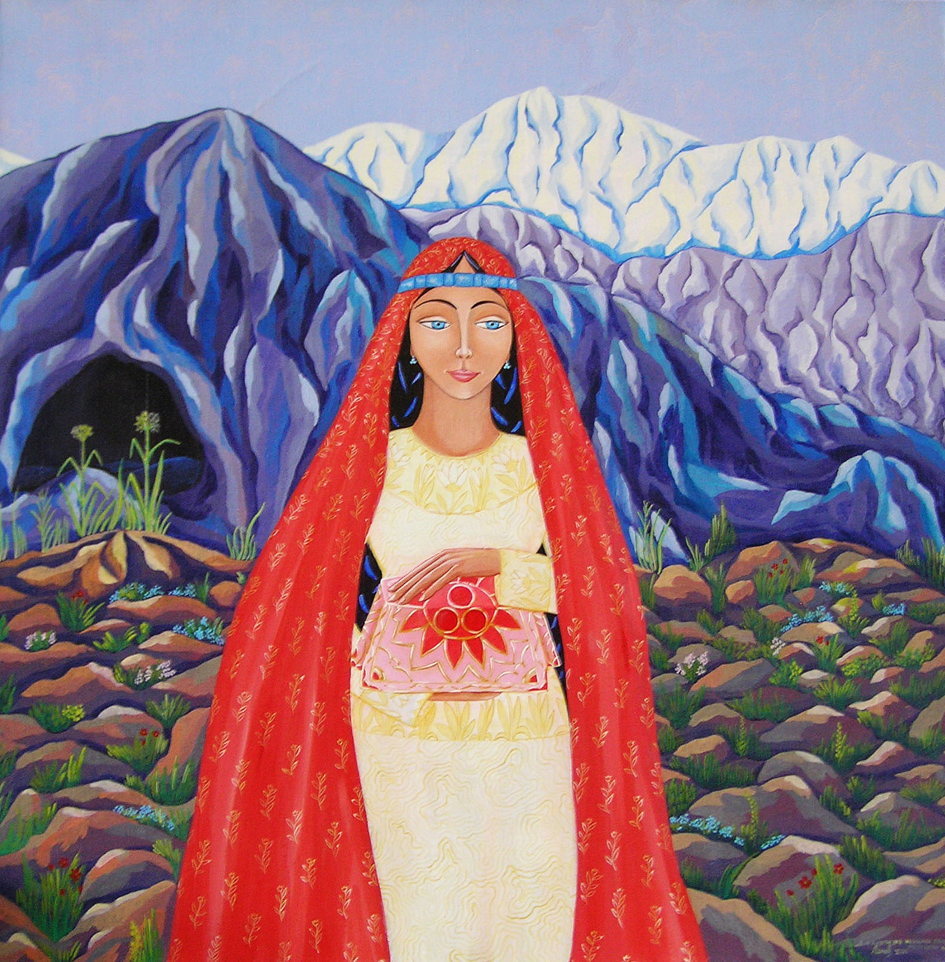
Woman from Belovodye, Lola Lonli, 2000

The Ynglists reject official historical narrative, which they believe to be manipulated, and argue that it should be replaced with history as told in their Slavo-Aryan Vedas or with koshchunosloviya, that is history based on Russian folk tales (koshchuny). They believe that "Yngling", a name that identifies the earliest royal dynasties of Sweden and Norway, means "offspring of Yngly", and that the historical Ynglings migrated to Scandinavia from the region of Omsk, which was a spiritual centre of the early Aryans. They hold that the Saga ob Ynglingakh, their Russian version of the Scandinavian Ynglinga saga (itself composed by Snorri Sturluson on the basis of an older Ynglingatal), proves their ideas about the origins of the Ynglings in Omsk, and that the Scandinavian Eddas are ultimately a more recent, western European and Latinised version of their own sacred books, the Slavo-Aryan Vedas.

Ynglism presents itself as the true spirituality of the Aryans, a term which means "harmonious men", those who live in accordance with the laws of God and therefore manifest bright physical features and clear thoughts. The Aryans were spiritually influenced by the northern celestial pole and its circumpolar stars, especially the astral images of the Big Dipper and Little Dipper, respectively parts of the Great Bear and Little Bear; these constellations, spinning around the pole, draw the changing image of Yngly (the swastika) in the four phases of the day and the year. The Aryans would be the incarnation in Yav of gods of such northern polar astral plane, which is the Iriy or Svarga and corresponds to the Bright Nav; these gods are called Ases and the Aryans would be the "heavenly kin" (небесный род, nebesny rod). The first Aryans dwelt at the geographic North Pole, the Arctic, and because of this they are known in Greek sources as the "Hyperboreans", the inhabitants of "Hyperborea" (literally "over the north"). Hyperborea was named Daarya (Даария) by the Aryans in their original language, and is also known by the Ynglists as "Arctida".

After leaving their original homeland Daarya, the Aryans settled in what is today the vast expanse of Eurasia, where the richest occurrences of hooked cross symbolism in historical testimonies have been found, in patterns of architecture, weaponry, and tools of everyday life. The Aryans gave this vast territory the name "Asia" (the land of incarnated gods) or Rassenya (Рассеня), a term which would have evolved into "Ruthenia" and "Russia". The Ynglist author Trekhlebov claims that most of the ancient peoples of Eurasia, known by a variety of ethnonyms, were in fact ramifications of the Slavo-Aryans, and that the same term "Russians" and related ones come from the Aryan root ros meaning "radiance", "light" and "holiness".

The precise area where they established the centre of their civilisation was that which in Russian folklore is known as Belovodye (Беловодье; "White Waters"), which the Ynglists locate in Siberia and identify as the same as the Tibetan concept of Shambhala, the Scandinavian Asgard ("Gods-Realm"), and the land of the Rigvedic rivers: they identify the rivers as the Yenisei and Angara, the Lena, the Irtysh and Ob, and the Ishim and the Tobol. This country was also called Pyatirechye (Пятиречье), and when the Aryans' domains reached the Ishim and the Tobol it became known as Semirechye (Семиречье). The Aryans built their architectures according to the pattern of Alatyr — a Slavic mythological stone or mountain which represents the world centre or the world axle —, which is the same as the image of Yngly (hooked cross), which endows human consciousness with virtue. Omsk was the location of the capital "Asgard the Great" or "Asgard of Iriy" of the Aryan spiritual civilisation, and it is the place where the salvation of all humanity begins. In Okunevo, in the same region of Omsk, was located an important religious centre, where, according to Ynglist beliefs, original Aryan knowledge was preserved even in times of Christianisation and secretly passed down generation by generation eventually coming to Aleksandr Khinevich himself.

The Ynglist chronological account of history begins either with the end of the Last Glacial Period (c. 13.000 BCE), with the descent of the gods from the "celestial temple" of Iriy, or with the foundation of "Asgard of Iriy". Ynglism would be the means to regather the Aryans and reconnect them to their progenitors, reawakening their pristine way to perceive the world. Ynglist doctrine proposes an apocalyptic eschatology according to which a "great priest" and a "great priestess" from Omsk will lead the forces of light against the forces of darkness, which will eventually be vanquished and destroyed in the "end of the world"; as told in the Book of the Wisdom of Perun:

... he will be reborn again in one circle of years, and this will be the last time of the reign of the forces of darkness, in all parts of Midgard-Earth. The all-crushing fire of retribution of the forces of light will burn the servants of the world of darkness and all the descendants of foreign enemies who filled the human world with soulless emptiness carrying on their banners: lies and vices, laziness and cruelty, desire and lust, fear and self-doubt. And it will be the great end of the world for the foreign enemies who came from the dark world. And the end of the time of darkness will come for all the kins of the great race and the descendants of the heavenly kin.

=== Morality and ethics ===
==== The Nine Great Warps ====
Symbol of the Slavo-Aryan race, the "heavenly kin"; the four beams of the hooked cross represent its four subdivisions, based on the eye colours: gray the Da'Aryans, green the Kh'Aryans, hazel the Rassenians, blue the Svyatorussians. It is often completed by a sword pointing downward over the hooked cross, representing the descent of the primordial fire of Yngly and the wisdom of the Slavo-Aryans.

The "Nine Great Warps" (Девять Великих Основ, Devyat' Velikikh Osnov) constitute the ethical code of Ynglism which guides the "weft" of the destiny of the Aryans and their descendants towards perfection. Similarly to Theosophical beliefs, Khinevich taught that the different human races have different astral origins. Only Aryans, that is to say white races, are considered to be the offspring of the gods of the spheres of the Svarga, the Bright Nav, while non-Aryan black races are considered to be the offspring of deep-space demons of the Dark Nav. The union of whites and blacks is held to produce wicked mixlings, the "gray race", and the Abrahamic religions and the masses they persuade are believed to be essentially of a gray nature. In some Ynglist writings, the term "grays" does not define black-white mixlings, but the pre-existing deep-space demons themselves who would have penetrated some peoples of the non-white races, including both the black and the yellow races. In still other writings, the gray race of deep-space demons would try to possess and corrupt all the other races, including the white, the black, the yellow and the red races, by hybridising with them.

Aleksandr Khinevich stressed that Ynglism is a religion exclusively for white people. The gods of the Bright Nav when incarnated in Yav are known as Ases, and they are the progenitors of all the kins of the Aryans and the Slavs, the heavenly kin. The Slavo-Aryan kins are subdivided into four major lineages: the Aryans are subdivided into the gray-eyed Da'Aryans carriers of blood type O, and the green-eyed Kh'Aryans carriers of blood type O and rarely A; the Slavs are subdivided into the hazel-eyed Rassenians carriers of blood type A and rarely O, and the blue-eyed Svyatorussians carriers of blood type O or A. The goal of the Ases is to pass on, generation by generation and through the reincarnations, the spiritual wisdom for continuous perfection and recreation whose aim is favouring the return of souls to the Bright Nav and the ascension to Prav.

The Warps are:

1. Dedication, towards the study of holy writings, traditions and ancestral wisdom, and to the worship of the gods.
2. Spirituality, that is to say engagement in understanding and developing one's spiritual side.
3. Compassion, for all living things created by God.
4. Penitence, for upkeeping the harmony of body and spirit which grants peace.
5. Tolerance, for the freedom of others which nevertheless may not go against the right laws of God.
6. Friendship, towards other human lineages but not towards wicked people who go against the right laws of God.
7. Love, towards all living things created by God and reflected among humans as the worship of ancestors.
8. Testing, to be gone through in order to develop spiritual virtue.
9. Integration, to say the search for and upkeeping of the meaning and purpose that everything has within its own context.

In addition to the Nine Great Warps, there are thirty-three commandments for each of the nine great celestial deities.

==== Family and politics ====
The Ynglist Church is concerned with the health of the Russians, and other Slavic peoples, and of the family as any folk's fundamental unit, and its values are exceptionally conservative. They emphasise that men are innately disposed towards "public" life and spiritual quest, while women fulfill themselves in the "private" life of the family at home and in the function of reproduction. Kaarina Aitamurto described the church as strongly patriarchal; the social model that Ynglism proposes is the traditional hierarchy of the family, headed by male elders. The veche (assembly) of the church itself is conceived as the gathering of these elders, the fathers. According to Ynglist beliefs, women are "so tied to their natural task of reproduction" that they may not reach the same intellectual and spiritual achievements of men, who are naturally more prone to the abstract thinking that is needed for political assignments.

Ynglism is critical of modern Western liberal democracy, and espouses instead an ideal of democracy that is more similar to ancient Greek democracy. According to the Ynglists, universal suffrage leads to unwise decisions and ultimately to the disruption of society, because the majority of people are not wise. In their view, modern liberal democracies are dictatorships of the "biggest minorities", whereas ancient Slavic veche and mir were based on "consensual decision-making". The Ynglists propose the traditional Russian principle of samoderzhavie, a word they interpret as "people ruling themselves", claimed to be the highest "true will of the people" which comes to be incarnated and exercised by a wise ruler.

==== Education and "beneficial offspring" ====
According to the Ynglist Church, the demographic decline of contemporary Russia has to be studied as a crisis of the psycho-physical heritage transmitted by Russian parents to their children, and of the environment where these children grow up. Within the Ynglist Church, the "purity of the kin (rod) and the blood" is considered a divine command: miscegenation and incest, as well as "perverted" sexuality without reproductive ends and the consumption of alcohol and drugs, are forbidden as unhealthy threats of "modern confusion" imported from the "degenerated" West. Miscegenation, the production of gray mixlings from the union of white and black races, would cause "spiritual and intellectual decline". As a solution, Ynglists emphasise the theme of "creating beneficial descendants" (созидание благодетельного потомства, sozidanye blagodetel'nogo potomstva), and encourage the creation of large families of up to sixteen children, considered the number of an ideal "full circle of offspring".

In a broader metaphysical discourse, all forces of globalisation coming from the West are perceived as alien models that infiltrate and spoil the spirit and language of Slavic culture. An excerpt from the Slavo-Aryan Vedas declaims:

It is not appropriate for Slavs and Aryans to venerate alien idols, to pour water into an alien watermill, to give one's psychic energy to an alien egregor! There is no point for Russians to destroy their own Slavic and Aryan culture with their own hands by adopting an alien pseudo-culture! Our ancestors warn us from the distant past: "... we ourselves are the grandchildren of Dazhdbog and have not aspired to sneak in the footsteps of foreigners".

Ynglist doctrines emphasise a "healthy way of life", which includes eating natural and pure food, being responsible and sober, but also ideas based on theories of human biology and genetics which are "far from academic perceptions". For instance, the Ynglists firmly condemn sex out of wedlock, as they believe that it, as all other "unnatural" ways of life, shortens the lifespan, and they espouse the theory of telegony, that is to say the idea that a woman is genetically shaped by the men with whom she has sexual intercourse, and her offspring would inherit genetic characteristics of all her bedmates. They also believe that giving birth makes a woman three years younger, if other aspects of her life are correct. Regarding telegony, Aleksandr Khinevich taught:

... the first lover of a woman gives her the form of the Spirit and Blood of his Rod and therefore, even if the woman gets later married to another man, her children will genetically be of her first lover. Furthermore, people are designed to live for centuries, but because of the unhealthy and unnatural way of life they nowadays tend to die prematurely. Every extramarital intercourse shortens man's life in three years.

== Practices ==
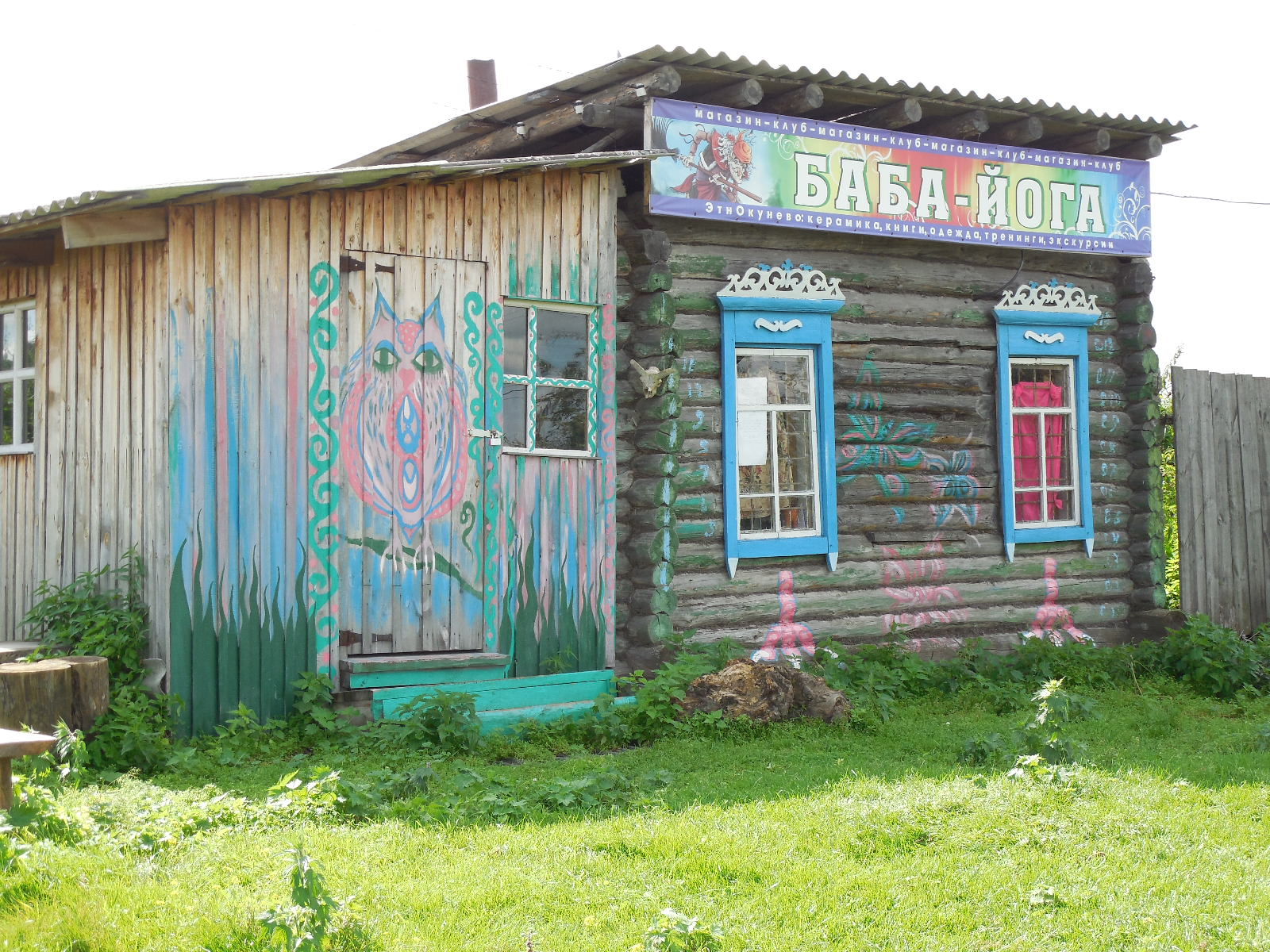
A "Baba Yoga" club in Okunevo, Omsk Oblast. In Ynglism, Baba Yaga, whose original name is Baba Yoga, meaning the "Yogini Mother", is a goddess representing female yujists who initiate orphan children to the Aryan gods through a fire rite, to make them priests and leaders of communities; she would have been demonised by the Christians, who turned her into the old hag who eats children of modern Russian folklore.

The Ynglist Church is known for its intensive proselytism, carried out through a "massive selling" of books, journals and other media. The Ynglists spread the content of the Slavo-Aryan Vedas, teach "Aryan mathematics" and ancient grammar, and also health techniques. They also spread the use a system of "Slavo-Aryan runes" in which the original metallic sheets of the Slavo-Aryan Vedas were written.

=== Clergy, temples and rituals ===
The scholar Alexey Gaidukov described Ynglism as having a well-defined hierarchic ecclesiastical structure and worship system. The Ynglist Church is led by the Pater Diy ("Divine Father", "Shining Father); from the 1990s throughout the 2020s the Pater Diy is Aleksandr Khinevich, also known as volkhv Kolovrat. The Pater Diy is the head of the utmost Council of Elders (Совет Старейшин, Sovet Stareyshin) of the church. Any priest (жрец, zhrets; священник, svyashchennik) member of the church may be appointed to become the succeeding Pater Diy, but he must not be younger than 21 years old. Below the Pater Diy, there are five ranks in the sacerdotal hierarchy of the church:

1. Ingling-svyashchennik (Инглинг-священник, "Yngling priest"), the highest rank of priests below the Pater Diy whose duty is to perform divine liturgies.
2. Khramovnik (храмовник, "templar"), defining priests who act as temple guardians, performing temple duties except divine liturgies. The khramovnik also bear a sword and a short dagger with themselves to represent their role as temple guardians.
3. Volkhv (волхв, "mage"), defining priests who perform sacraments inside and outside the temples, except divine liturgies and temple duties.
4. Strannik (странник, "wanderer"), defining priests who assist the former two ranks in performing temple duties, sacraments, and also wander as missionaries.
5. Dukhovnik (духовник, "spiritual confessor"), defining priests who perform only rituals of purification and initiation, including baptisms. All of them wear white robes, with cloaks and belts of different colours to distinguish the rank they belong to.

Such sacerdotal hierarchy, like the organisation of temples (khram) and communities, mimicks that of Eastern Orthodox Christianity.

Contrary to other Rodnover traditions which prefer that collective worship is held at shrines consisting of wooden idols (капь, kap') and other ritual elements placed in clearings or natural open holy spaces, Ynglism emphasises that worship should be held inside walled temples. The worship of the gods and the ancestors is conducted by the Ynglists through a detailedly elaborated liturgy in which the style of speech and behaviour of the participants are similar to those of Orthodox Christians. Also similar is the strict regulation of performance, timing and content of prayers and appeals; the Ynglists conduct rituals and recite prayers at precise times of the day and before or after undertaking certain actions, such as before beginning to work, before going to sleep, and similar others. Prayers, speech formulations, are held to be energetic vibrations directed to certain gods, thus going to certain stars and constellations which are the bodies of such gods; Slavo-Aryan prayers are meant to go mainly to the northern celestial pole, Svarga. Yearly gatherings (veche) of great numbers of Ynglist believers are held in summer.

All Ynglist believers have to go through three rites of initiation, for entry and confirmation in the communion of the church; three baptisms, respectively in water, fire and spirit: the baptism in water is undergone at the age of 9 and marks the entry into the communion of the church; the baptism in fire is undergone at the age of 24 and confirms the presence of the believer in the communion; the baptism in spirit is undergone at the age of 36, considered the age when a person reaches full adulthood and is sanctified for creating a new family. Weddings in Ynglism are usually held in coincidence with the holiday and month of Kolyada (December). During their divine liturgies, the Ynglists practise a peculiar gesture, the "holy sign" (святое знамение), to "illustrate the holy faith, repeating the holy lightning of Perun which consecrated the life of the ancestors": to do it, the third phalanges of the thumb, the ring finger and the small finger of the right hand are joined together to represent the great Triglav of Svarog-Perun-Svetovid, as well as conscience, freedom and light, while the index and the middle finger are joined in straight line to represent the heavenly kin (the genealogy) and the mother goddess receiving it; folded in this way, the two straightened fingers first touch the forehead, then the left eye, then the right eye, and endly the mouth.

=== Yujism ===
Yujist figurative representation of reality

Yujism (юджизм; Ynglist runes:; lit. "good life"; also spelled "yudzhism" or "eujism") is the learning and practice of the right view on reality, characteristic of and taught by the "earliest ancestors" with whom the Ynglists identify themselves — the Aryans. The fundamental requirement for learning yujism is the ability of figurative thought; according to the Ynglists, images convey much more informations than either sounds or gestures, whence the movement's emphasis on runes, which immediately set in motion images in the mind. The goal of yujism is the perception and understanding of reality as an energetic process; when one becomes conscious of such energetic process, yujism becomes his way of life.

The first rune, the "image of Yngly" which is the swastika symbol, is conceived as well as the representation of yuj or yudzh (юдж) itself, which Ynglist sources themselves equate with Indian yoga. Yuj is the expansion of human consciousness that is triggered by becoming aware of how the energetic process of reality works by articulating itself into a duality, a positive and a negative stream — or rather celestial creative-innovative and terrestrial conservative-repetitive stream — of the universal radiation of Yngly, called respectively ha (ха) and tha (тха) and represented by the two possible directions of the swastika, respectively rightwise 卍 and leftwise 卐. The Ynglists claim that tha and ha are the ancient Slavic names of the same dual concept that is known in Chinese thought as yin and yang. The Ynglist author Trekhlebov asserted that Slavo-Aryans are those who make balance between principles of yin and yang by living in harmony with the law of the supreme God.

The yujist worldview is schematically represented by the figure of a "flat earth sustained by three elephants, themselves sustained by a turtle which swims in an unlimited ocean": the flat earth represents the twofold structure of perception, ha and tha — articulating in all dualities, from "yes–no" to "up–down"; the three elephants symbolise the three dimensions of reality — Yav, Nav and Prav — material, ideal (which realises itself in words) and mystical reality, which are also three forms of being; and the turtle is yuj itself, that is to say the awakened consciousness, which draws information from the ocean, which represents the infinite energy of God (the Ynglia).

Before engaging in yujist practices, an Ynglist believer should always recite the following prayer to his ancestors:

Forefather Rod, progenitors of the heavenly kin! Strengthen my heart in the holy faith, grant me the wisdom of my ancestors, your sons and grandsons. Grant happiness and peace to your peoples, now and ever from century to century.

==== Ninefold energetic system ====
Representation of the nine energetic centres of the human body

According to Ynglist yujism, when the universal energy forms the human body it flows along the spinal cord and coalesces throughout energetic centres or chakras, a concept which the Ynglists claim to belong to the worldview of the ancient Slavo-Aryans and which was later adopted and simplified in Indian religions. The spinal cord is a conductor which has a positive pole (+) receiving the celestial energy flow (ha 卍) from the north pole down through the right side of the body, and a negative pole (-) receiving the terrestrial energy flow (tha 卐) from the south pole up through the left side of the body.

In the Ynglist yujist system there are a total of thirty-seven energetic centres in the human body, of which nine are the fundamental ones which receive the universal energy and the other twenty-eight are ancillary ones which settle the energy received by the nine main ones. The nine energetic centres are divided into three lower chakras responsible for physical development, three middle chakras responsible for mental development, and three upper chakras responsible for spiritual development. The nine energetic centres, from the upper to the lower ones and each with the corresponding colour and musical sound frequency, are:

1. Istok (исток) in the coccyx region, which receives the material watery energy and information ascending from the south pole, whose colour is black and which vibrates at low infrasound frequencies.
2. Zarod (зарод) in the pubis region, which allocates energy to the generation of life, whose colour is red and which vibrates at the note Do..
3. Zhivot (живот) in the abdomen region, which allocates energy to physical development, whose colour is orange and which vibrates at the note Re.
4. Persi (перси) in the thorax region, which allocates energy to creativity, whose colour is yellow and which vibrates at the note Mi.
5. Lada (лада) in the right shoulder, which allocates energy to love and goodness, whose colour is green, which vibrates at the note Fa, and which is also known as the "solar breath".
6. Lelya (леля) in the left shoulder, which allocates energy to intuition, whose colour is azure, which vibrates at the note Sol, and which is also known as the "lunar breath".
7. Usta (уста) in the throat region, which allocates energy to the vocal expression of thought, whose colour is blue and which vibrates at the note La.
8. Chelo (чело) in the forehead region, which allocates energy to the figurative expression of thought and to vision, whose colour is purple and which vibrates at the note Si.
9. Rodnik (родник), in the crown region, which receives the spiritual fiery energy and information descending from the north pole, from the gods and the ancestors, whose colour is white and which vibrates at high ultrasound frequencies.

The universal energy flowing through the centres of the human body converges into a point in the region of the heart where the two polarities of the flux — the rightwise masculine fiery energy of the north pole (ha) and the leftwise feminine watery energy of the south pole (tha) — become harmonised, and the thus reunified energy unfolds as a spinning cross represented by the Ynglist symbol of the svadebnik (свадебник, "wedding"). The energetic flux and its informations would also be conveyed by channels of the blood system; the different human races — black, red, gray, yellow and white — would have different functions in reality based on different configurations of the energetic channels of their blood — respectively six, nine, ten, twelve and sixteen channels, arranged in different shapes. In gray-generated mixlings there would be a predominance of the feminine watery polarity on the masculine fiery polarity as typical of the gray race, and the energetic channels would be unstable, so that the flux of the universal energy would be disrupted giving rise to degenerative and self-destructive physical and mental flaws.

==== Ninefold bodily system ====
According to Ynglist yujism, the human body — created by the nine chakras conveying the flux of the universal energy — also exists energetically on nine levels, of which one representation is the traditional Russian matryoshka doll made of nine wooden figures placed one inside the other in decreasing size. Of the nine energetic bodies, three are in the Yav physical dimension and together constitute what is commonly referred to as the "body" (тело, telo), three are in the Nav astral-mental dimension and together constitute what is commonly referred to as the "soul" (душа, dusha), and three are in the Prav supra-mental dimension and together constitute what is commonly referred to as the "spirit" (дух, dukh).

The bodies of Yav are:

1. The "explicit body" (явное тело, yavnoye telo), which is the densest material body.
2. The "protective body" (защитное тело, zashchitnoye telo), which is the thin layer around the material body which protects it.
3. The "mensural body" (мерное тело, mernoye telo), which contains the former two functioning like a structural mould.

The bodies of Nav are:

1. The "astral body" (астральное тело, astral'noye telo), which is the body that a person has on the plane of the stars to move between them.
2. The "mental body" (ментальное тело, mental'noye telo), which is the body that a person makes as an image of thought to move on such plane.
3. The "causal body" (каузальное тело, kausal'noye telo), which is the body moulded by contexts and relations in which a person finds itself on such plane.

The bodies of Prav are:

1. The "body of the soul" (тело души, telo dushi), which is the highest energetic essence created by Dzhiva present in all the dimensions but especially linking the astral-mental dimension to the spiritual supra-mental dimension.
2. The "body of the form" (тело формы, telo formy), which is the highest formal essence imparted by the celestial gods.
3. The "body of the spirit" (тело духа, telo dukha), the essence corresponding to the state of identification with the light of the utmost God itself.

=== Calendar ===
Ynglist kologod, also known as Alatyr. The runes representing the nine months have to be read counterclockwise starting from the top-left hooked cross of Yngly, representing the beginning of the year. The following eight months correspond to the eight gods proceeding from Yngly as the cycle of the Sun and to the eight phases of the year which such gods influence, which have to be read clockwise.

==== Krugolet and kologod ====
Ynglism proposes a unique structure of time which differs from that of other branches of Rodnovery and which Aleksandr Khinevich claimed to be a genuine Slavic calendar. It is used by the Ynglists for organising their life and their divine liturgies. It is based on great cycles of 144 years — krugolet (круголет), literally "circle flight", personified as Chislobog —, with each year beginning on 20 September on the autumn equinox, consisting of nine months of forty or forty-one days subdivided in weeks of nine days, with each day consisting of sixteen hours, each hour consisting of 144 minutes, and each minute of further subdivisions. In the krugolet, years are arranged in groups of sixteen, with fifteen of them constiting of 365 days and the sixteenth year consisting of 369 days. Each year also has its own name and associated animal (e.g. White Dog, White Goat, and the like).

According to Ynglist teachings, the "cycle of the year" (кологод, kologod) is itself a phenomenon reflecting the order of the supreme God, that is to say its active manifestation, Yngly. Each month's name may be written as a compound of two Ynglist runes, of which the first rune is either Ay (Ай), Bey (Бэй), Gey (Гэй), Day (Дай), E (Э), Vey (Вэй), Xey / Khey (Хей), or Tay (Тай), reflecting basic sounds in Indo-European tongues and representing the natural characteristics manifesting in the given month. The second rune in the names is always the rune Let (Летъ), which means "year" as well as "summer", as the months are phases of the year which comes to its full maturity in summer. The only exception to this rule is the first month, Ramkhat (Рамхатъ), whose name refers to the beginning of Ra-M-Kha's ordering action, Yngly, represented by the swastika-like first rune and extending as the entire year.

Month	Runic sign	Meaning	Corresponding Latinate month(s)
Ramkhat; Рамхатъ		Ramkhat represents the principle of divinity articulating itself as the first month and as the entirety of the year; Ra-M-Kha/Ramkha who sets in motion and sustains a new year cycle. Another symbol of this month is a hooked cross, which is the symbol of Yngly, the fiery action of the supreme God itself in the whole universe.	September–October
Aylet; Айлетъ		Aylet is the month of new gifts. The rune Ay means prosperity, full baskets. It is the propitious tide for weddings, for beginning building new things, and for harvests.	November
Beylet; Бэйлетъ		Beylet is the month of white light and peace, representing the pure radiance of divinity, glory and the resting of the soul.	December
Geylet; Гэйлетъ		Geylet is the month of blizzards and fierce and severe cold.	January–February
Daylet; Дайлетъ		Daylet is the month of the rebirth of nature; plants and animals awaken and are strengthened.	March
Elet; Элетъ		Elet is the month of sowing, this being the foremost meaning of the rune E. It is the sowing not only of seeds in the ground, but also of the word in people; it is therefore the month of naming and renaming of persons, for them to be born again.	April
Veylet; Вэйлетъ		Veylet is the month of winds. The rune Vey is an image of flying, and of blowing wind. This month is when Stribog ("Wind God") and his children are most active.	May–June
Xeylet; Хейлетъ		Xeylet, or spelled "Kheylet", is the month of the receipt of the gifts of nature. The rune Xey is an image of positive force. What was sown in Elet and grew throughout Veylet, is finally harvested in Xeylet.	July
Taylet; Тайлетъ		Taylet is the month of completion of the year, of divine creation, of full summer. The rune Tay means the top, the limit, the end of something (just like the homophonous Chinese grapheme and in words like "Taiga", literally "end of the path").	August

==== Holidays ====
Ynglists respect eight holidays throughout the year. They are arranged in the cycle of the year, symbolically identified as the Alatyr, and they correspond to the eight gods (laws) of Yngly reflected by the cycle of the Sun. Holidays are called "thresholds" (порог, porog) and they mark the beginning of the various phases of the year. The action of each god begins to influence nature two weeks before the entry in each new phase, and in these two weeks of "entrance to the holiday" the Ynglists purify themselves in both mind and body. There are also overarching phases: the phase between the holidays of Kolyada and Kupalo is that of the blossoming of masculine forces, while the phase between Lelya and Mokosh is that of the blossoming of feminine forces. The threshold of Perun marks a period of quiescence of all forces, while the subsequent Mara is a phase that is unfavourable for both the polarities of nature. Each holiday and the period which it opens has appropriate ritual actions to be carried out in order to remain in tune with the cycle of the year. The Ynglists believe that if one behaves incorrectly, that is to say not in harmony with the rites (ряд, ryad) which follow the natural rhythm of the year, his own biorhythm, connection with the ancestors, and life cycle are disrupted, he becomes unhealthy and gets old quickly.

Festival	Meaning	Period
Kolyada	Winter solstice. This is the threshold that marks the beginning of the spiral of the new year and the birth of the Sun. Everything is given the opportunity to be reborn in purified forms, and forces are ready for expanding into new creations. Men are instructed by ancestors on how to project the new year.	December
Veles	Veles is the god of the underworld, of wild animals and plants, and of the fertile soil from which new growth may develop. The Veles threshold marks the period in which one should think how to interact with natural laws and resources in order to bring his projects to completion.	February
Lelya	Spring equinox. The Lelya threshold marks the beginning of the period when masculine and feminine forces are perfectly aligned, love blossoms and they begin to exchange energies with each other. Men and women dance in circles, the former clockwise and the latter counterclockwise, so to look into the eyes of each other; energy is believed to be transmitted through the eyes and the hands. This is also the phase for putting projects into matter.	March–April
Yarilo	The Yarilo threshold marks the phase when powers sprout vehemently, ardently (яриться, yaritsya). In nature, everything starts to grow powerfully. This is the right time for merrymaking, games and feasts, and is a period of great inspiration and creativity.	May–mid June
Kupalo	Summer solstice. This is the threshold when the Sun reaches its brightest stage, and forces, both masculine and feminine, reach their highest strength. It marks the beginning of the phase when it is more likely for healthy children to be conceived.	Mid June–July
Perun	This is the threshold that marks the full maturity of males, but also the beginning of the decline of masculine forces, while women are in bloom. On the day of Perun men show their skills with weapons and in crafts, while afterwards they dedicate themselves to contemplation, hunting and fishing. On the same day, boys undergo a ritual of initiation into men.	August
Mokosh	Autumn equinox. Mokosh is the goddess of fate. This threshold marks a phase of introspection, as the year is coming to its end. Men examine their actions carried out during the outgoing year, in order to be transformed for the forthcoming year. The day of Mokosh is celebrated with a ritual consisting in taking a handful of soil, reckoning an action, be it good or bad, and giving it back to the Earth forming a raised circle of soil, then lighting a "bonfire of fate" or a candle in such circle which will purify all the year's actions. Another ritual with the same meaning consists of hanging a thread to the branch of a tree and then walking around the tree, men clockwise and women counterclockwise, twisting a spiral while shouting out what happened during the year.	September–October
Mara	This threshold marks the death of the Sun and the triumph of the chthonic goddess Marena, the primordial mother. Sensitive people are tendentially depressed in this phase. However, things die only in body, while thought continues to work and concentrates to be reborn in the new year. This makes this phase propitious for study and understanding divine knowledge.	November

=== Symbolism and numerology ===
The star of Yngly

The swastika — the hooked cross, whose Sanskrit name means "well being" — is a very important symbol in Ynglism, with fifty variations in Ynglist symbolism and twelve in Aleksey Trekhlebov's teachings. In Ynglism it represents the Ynglia, the fiery radiance enlivening and ordering everything in the universe, personified as Yngly; hence it is also called the "image of Yngly" and it is considered the first written symbol of humanity, as well as the foremost symbol of the Slavo-Aryans, and of the defence of their lands and their faith. Its many variations symbolise the various forms of life which are generated in accordance with Yngly — the patterns of the gods of planets, earthly weather phenomena, classes of entities, and so on.

Besides the swastika, another important symbol in Ynglism is the nine-pointed "star of Yngly" (звезда Инглии, zvezda Yngly), also called oberezhnik (обережник, symbol of the "guardian") and mati-gotka (мати-готка, "ready mother") in popular tradition, referring to matter ready to be ordained by the divine force. The Ynglia itself is often represented at the centre the star as a hooked cross, a thunder (Perun) or as a sword. The star of Yngly also represents the harmonised man (Aryan). The three intersecting triangles represent the three worlds of traditional Slavic cosmology (Prav, Yav and Nav), the Triglav manifestations within each of them, but also spirit, body and soul on the human plane. The circle surrounding the triangles represents the Ynglia itself, and also human consciousness awakened by the cognition of Yngly, while the infinite space beyond the circle is God's infinite potentiality. The three triangles also represent the elements of earth, water and fire, while the circle represents air and the infinite space beyond it represents the infinite Heaven (Svarga).

While Rodnovery generally rejects numerology and forms of medieval magic if numbers are conceived as abstract and not connected with objects of the real world, it accepts such practices if the numbers are seen in webs of symbolism with objects, as manifesting in objects of the real world. Ynglism is one of the denominations of Rodnovery in which numerical symbolism is best systematised. Particularly important symbolic numbers in Ynglism are: the number 3, which symbolises the triads of deities, especially the great Triglav of Svarog-Perun-Svetovid; the number 8, double of 4, which symbolises the four seasons of the year and the four horizontal divisions of space, both with four intermediate stages; the number 33, which is the number of the commandments of the celestial deities; and the number 108, which is the number of all possible sins. There are also numbers symbolically associated to the divisions of time: the number 9, which symbolises the nine months of the Ynglist year and the nine days of the Ynglist week; the number 16, which symbolises the sixteen hours of the Ynglist day; the number 40, which symbolises the forty days of each Ynglist even month; the number 144, which is the number of minutes of the Ynglist hour and of years in the great cycles of the Ynglist calendar; and the number 369, which is the number of days in a year.

== Sociology ==
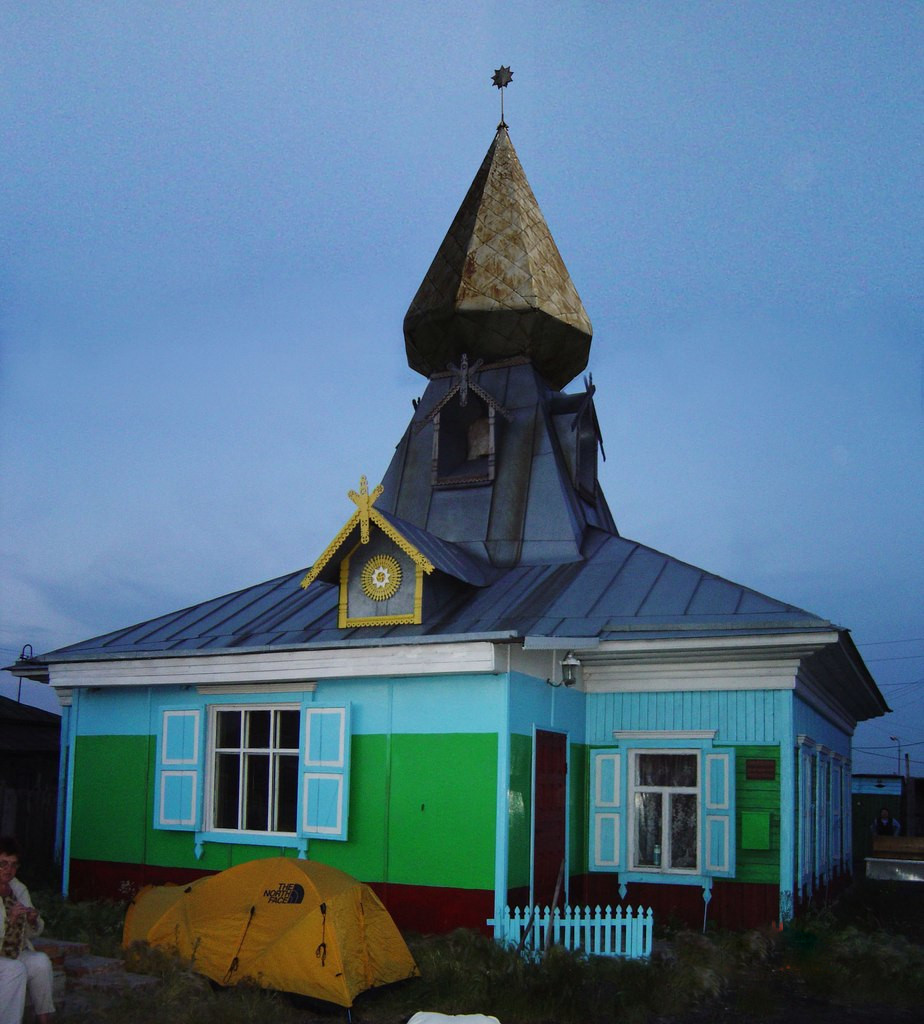
The Temple of the Wisdom of Perun, part of the headquarters of the Ynglist Church in Omsk, as it appeared in 2004, before it was destroyed by arson on September 16 of the same year. It was rebuilt in the 2010s.

=== Views on Christianity ===
Like other esoteric sciences, Ynglism is ambivalent towards Christianity, considering Jesus as an important prophet — a "great wanderer", veliky putnik — while accusing Christian churches to have distorted his original message, which would be preserved in apocryphal literature. The journal Dzhiva-Astra issued by the Ynglist Church published Gnostic scriptures which are popular among Russian nationalists. More specifically, the Ynglists regard Jesus as an incarnation of the constellation of Pisces, and Paulanism — Christianity as formulated by Paul of Tarsus — to be responsible for the corruption of much of his original teaching. The Ynglists also argue that early Slavic volkhvs were aware of the concepts of a supreme God and of the trinity, which were later borrowed by the Christian religion. Like other Rodnover groups, the Ynglists ultimately consider Christianity to be an anti-national international machination aimed at the degeneration and the enslavement of people, primarily the Slavs and the Russians in particular. They believe that Christianity was deliberately invented by the Jews — whom they consider as the leading elite of the wicked "gray race" — as an "excellent ideological weapon" to enslave the whole world.

=== Links with political parties ===
Kaarina Aitamurto characterised the Ynglist Church as less politically goal-oriented than other Rodnover movements. According to Victor Shnirelman, Aleksandr Khinevich was politically active in the propagation of Ynglist ideas between 1990 and 1993, but then left politics and became more focused on an esoteric development of the movement. The Russian scholar of religion Vladimir B. Yashin of the Department of Theology and World Cultures of Omsk State University wrote in 2001 that the Ynglist Church had close ties with the Omsk regional branch of the far-right political party Russian National Unity of Alexander Barkashov, whose members provided security and order during the mass gatherings of the Ynglists. On the other hand, the non-Ynglist Russian Rodnover leader Nikolay Speransky (volkhv Velimir) in the early 2010s classified Aleksandr Khinevich among the representatives of left-wing ideas within Rodnovery, although recognising that he then kept most of his activity outside of politics.

=== Judicial prosecution ===
Tensions between the Ynglist Church and authorities began in 1997 when complaints accused the former for its use of swastika-like religious symbolism and for ultranationalism. Years later, in 2004, the headquarters of the Ynglist Church in Omsk, namely the "Spiritual Administration of the Asgardian Country of Belovodye", were prosecuted and dissolved as "extremist organisations" by decision of the Omsk Regional Court, a decision which was appealed at the Supreme Court of Russia later that year, but was upheld by the court. The reasons for the prosecution were once again the use of swastika symbols and the teachings about the unhealthiness of interracial mixing; Aleksandr Khinevich himself was prosecuted in 2008–2009 by the Omsk District Court, which found him guilty of having illegally reorganised the church and continued to propagate its teachings, under the article 282 of the Criminal Code of the Russian Federation, and on 11 June 2009 sentenced him to the punishment of one year and a half of prison, conditional with two years of probation.

In 2008, a local Ynglist organisation in Adygea was prosecuted by the Maykop District Court, while in 2015 an Ynglist organisation in Stavropol Krai was prosecuted by the Stavropol Regional Court. In the same year 2015 it was the turn of the Slavo-Aryan Vedas, the sacred writings of Ynglism, to be condemned as "extremist literature" by the Omsk District Court, a decision which was later appealed but confirmed in 2016 by the Omsk Regional Court.

=== Demographics ===
Despite the judicial prosecutions, Ynglist organisations continued their activities and mass celebrations as an unregistered religious movement, having expanded to all the federal subjects of Russia and to various countries abroad, and Aleksandr Khinevich himself resumed large-scale preaching activities in 2011. According to the scholar Vladimir B. Yashin, it would have been impossible for the authorities to uproot the church from public life, since in 2001 there were already about three thousand Ynglists in Omsk alone. By 2009, the number of Ynglists in Omsk alone had grown to 13,000. Meanwhile, between 2001 and 2009 the community of permanent residents at the Asgardian headquarters had grown from 500 to 600 people. In 2016, the scholar Kaarina Aitamurto reported that Ynglism clearly had a "substantial number of followers", while Elena Golovneva noted that Ynglist ideas were not marginal even among non-Ynglist Russian Rodnovers.

According to Yashin, Ynglism came out strengthened after the prosecutions, turning into a decentralised phenomenon, a movement of dozens of organisations which were not only present in all of the regions of Russia, particularly in Krasnodar, Chelyabinsk and Tyumen, in Moscow, but also present in Ukraine, Germany and the Czech Republic. Judge V. A. Matytsin of the Omsk District Court reported that as of 2009 the movement had also established communities in Estonia, Latvia and Lithuania, as well as in the United States and Canada. According to Yashin, Ynglism, along with mainstream Rodnovery, has gained many adherents in the regions of the North Caucasus of southern Russia because many Slavs who live there believe that Ynglism and Rodnovery represent their cultural identity, which they believe is at war with the culture of the area's Islamic population.

Golovneva reported that at the time of her study the activities of Ynglist communities were financed by their parishioners themselves and by two commercial organisations, namely "Asgard" and "Iriy", which were involved in building and consulting. She found that among the Ynglists in Omsk, many of them were teenagers and young adults, both under-graduate and post-graduate students, "modern people with a great reverence for the spirituality of the past". An adherent of Ynglism stated that the movement's doctrines were attractive to "a full cross-section of society", from "immature youth to bureaucrats, businessmen and military personnel", and these people found "normal, harmonious mutual relationships" within the movement.

== See also ==
- Slavic Rodnovery
  - Anastasianism
  - Levashovism
  - Peterburgian Vedism
  - Vseyasvetnaya Gramota
- Germanic Heathenry
  - Ariosophy
- Historical Vedic religion
  - Hinduism
- Zoroastrianism
