= Okunevo, Omsk Oblast =

Human settlement in Muromtsevsky District, Omsk Oblast, Russia

Coordinates: 56°26′20″N 74°54′27″E

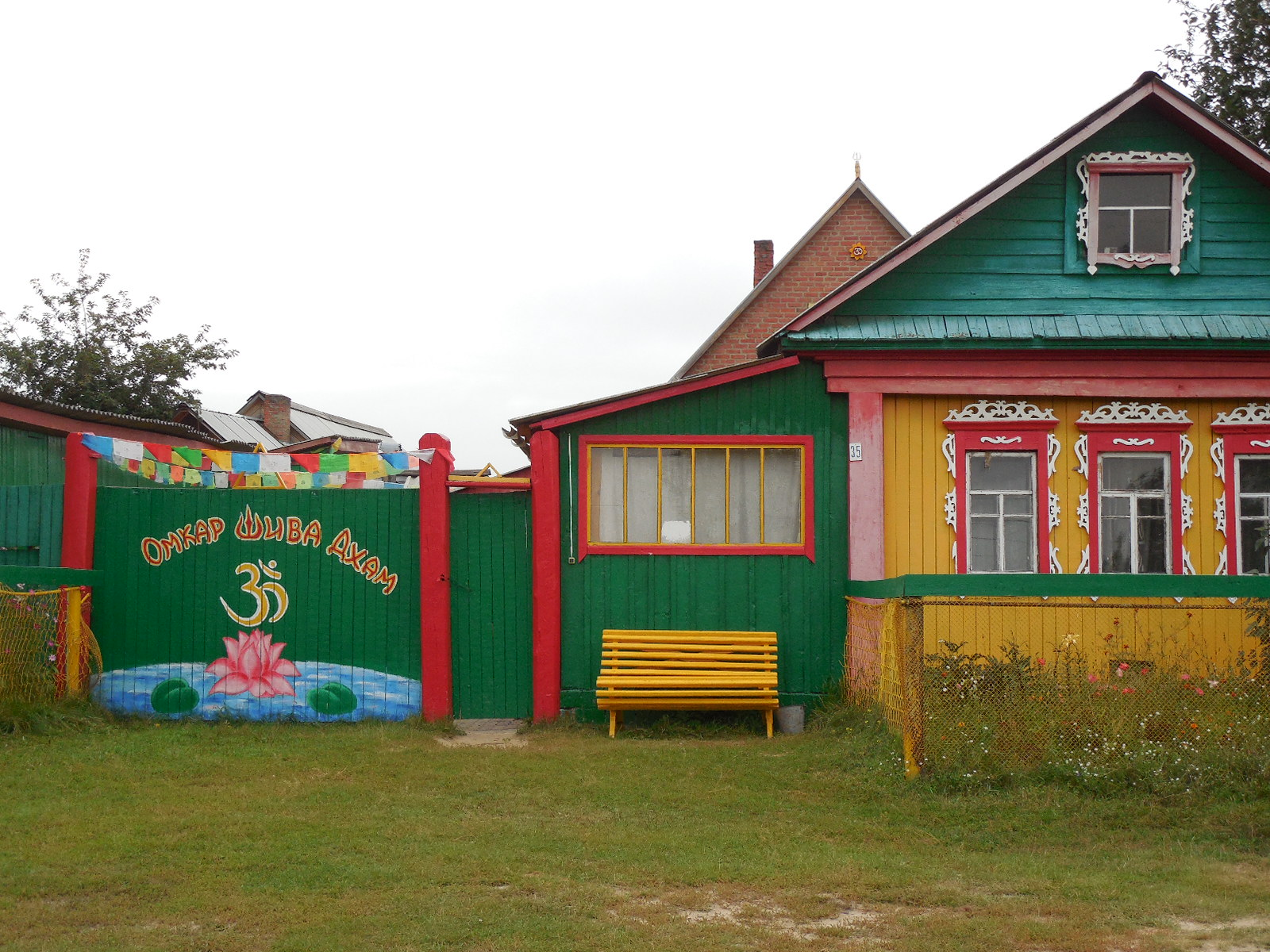
Babajist Shaivite temple of Omkar Shiva Ashram in Okunevo.

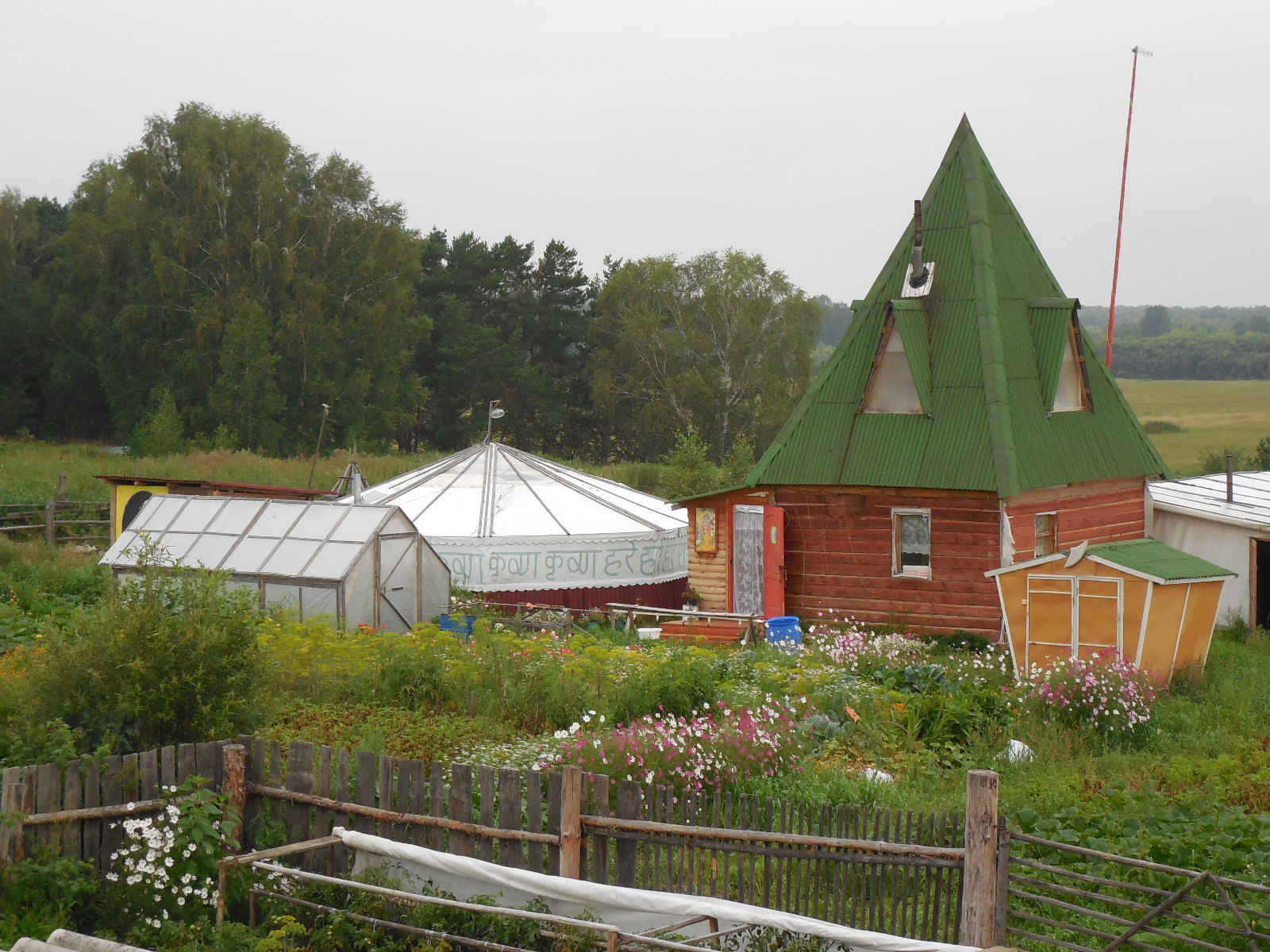
Krishnaite temple in Okunevo.

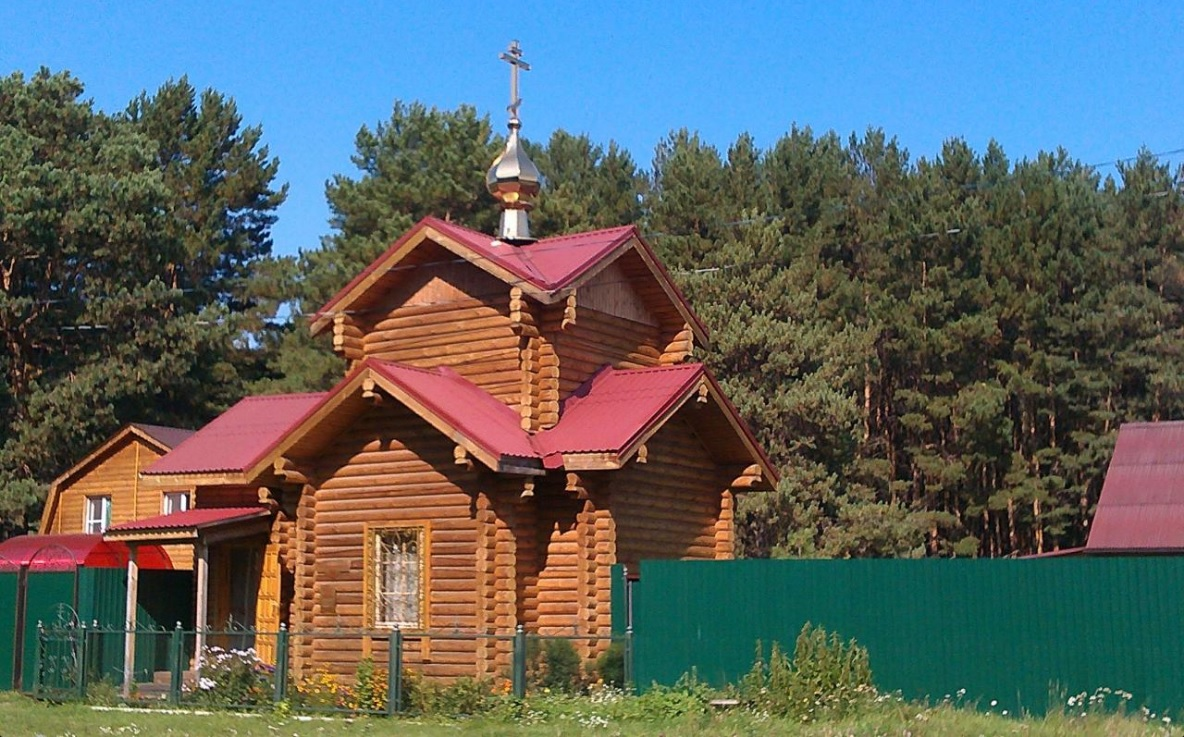
Orthodox Christian church in Okunevo.

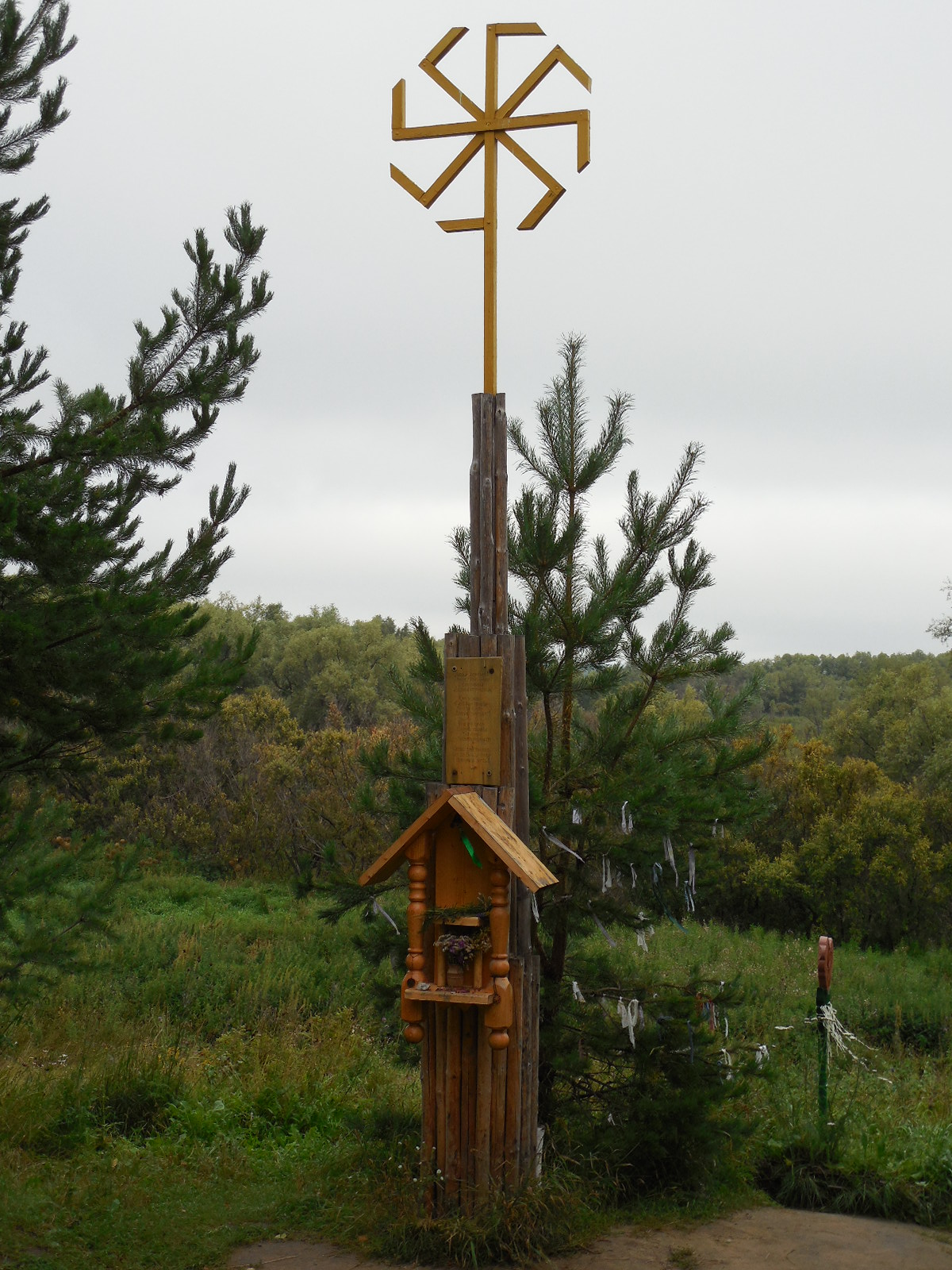
Rodnover shrine in Okunevo.

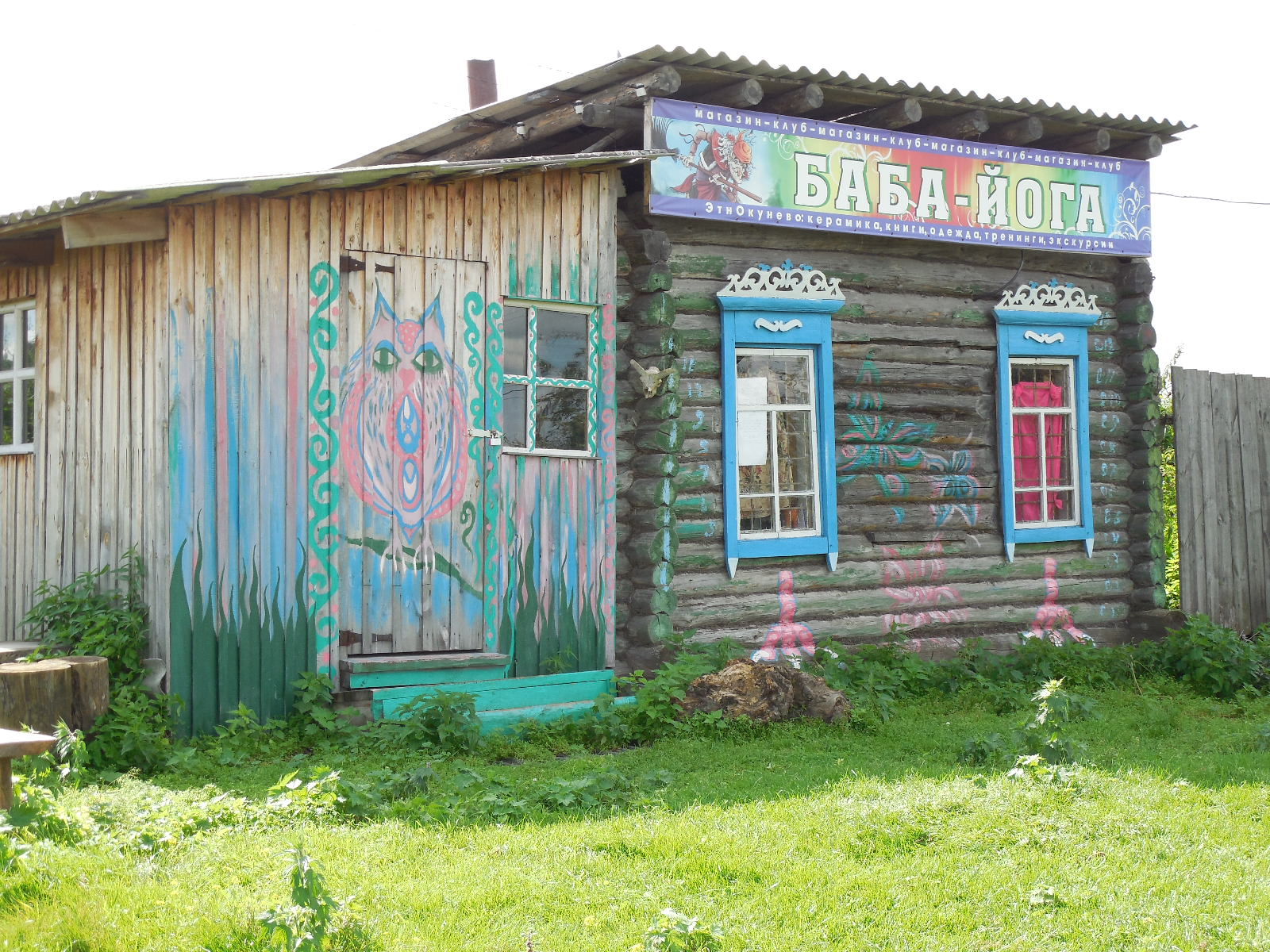
Baba Yoga Club in Okunevo.

Okunevo (Russian: Окунево) is a rural locality (a village) in the Muromtsevsky District of Omsk Oblast, Russia, situated on the Tara River 240 kilometres north of Omsk. Okunevo is one of a number of modern "places of power", or holy places of Russian new religious movements. The majority of the inhabitants of the village are adherents of various of these religions: Rodnovery, Ynglism, Roerichism, Babajism (a branch of Shaivism), Krishnaism, Vedism and others. There is also an Orthodox Christian community.

== Religious sites ==
The locality hosts places of worship for various religions:

- Babajist Omkar Shiva Dham ("Place where Creation Began") — an ashram established in 1995, with two temple halls, a garden, residential and dining buildings, and other facilities;
- Omkar — a syncretic ritual site with an Orthodox Chapel of Saint Michael the Archangel, a Hindu dhuni altar, and a Rodnover altar surmounted by a kolovrat;
- Tyub — a Rodnover ritual site with an idol of the goddess Tara;
- Temple of the International Society for Krishna Consciousness;
- Orthodox Church of the Descent of the Holy Spirit on the Apostles.

Okunevo began to acquire popularity as a sacred site in 1991, after it was chosen by Rasma Rozitis (Radjani), a Lithuanian disciple of the Babajist movement of Shaivism, as the supposed site of an ancient Vedic temple of the deity Hanuman according to the movement's narrative, which, like other Hindu movements, considers Russia to be the "country of the sages", and Siberia to be the cradle of all Indo-European peoples from where they eventually made their way to Hindustan. Rozitis chose Okunevo in the region of Omsk because of the region's name's assonance with the holy syllable Om, the sound of divine energy in Hinduism; because of the names of the river and the city of Tara located in the Muromtsevsky District, corresponding to the name of the Indian goddess Tara; and because of the presence of the Okunevo Archaeological Complex, an ancient ritual site.

The Ynglists believe Okunevo to be the location of an ancient religious centre of the Aryans of Belovodye where original Aryan knowledge was preserved even after Christianisation, and secretly passed down generation by generation eventually coming to Aleksandr Khinevich, the founder of the Ynglist Church.

The Russian Orthodox sites of Okunevo were created by the Russian Orthodox Church in an attempt to counter the influence of the other religious movements.

== Okunevo Archaeological Complex ==
The Okunevo Archaeological Complex dates back to the Bronze Age and early Iron Age and includes an ancient sacrificial altar on the border between two climatic zones, steppe and taiga.

== Notable visitors ==
Okunevo has been visited by a number of known personalities from all over the world:

- The Russian comedian Mikhail Nikolayevich Zadornov;
- The lead singer of the Aquarium band Boris Grebenshchikov;
- The Russian-Israeli businessman Roman Abramovich;
- The Moroccan prince Ibrahim Khalil;
- The Nepali princess Himani Shah, and others.

== Gallery ==
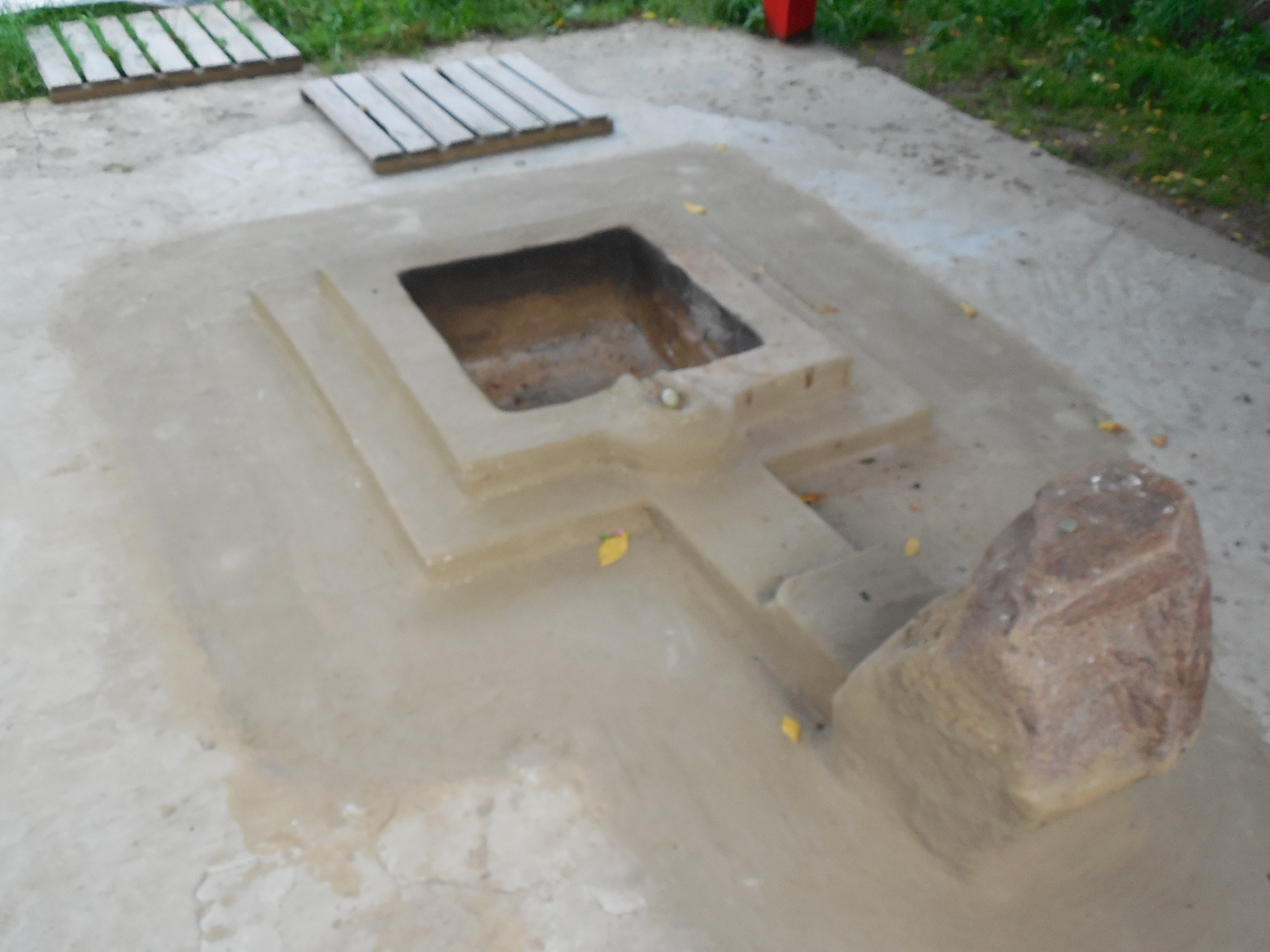

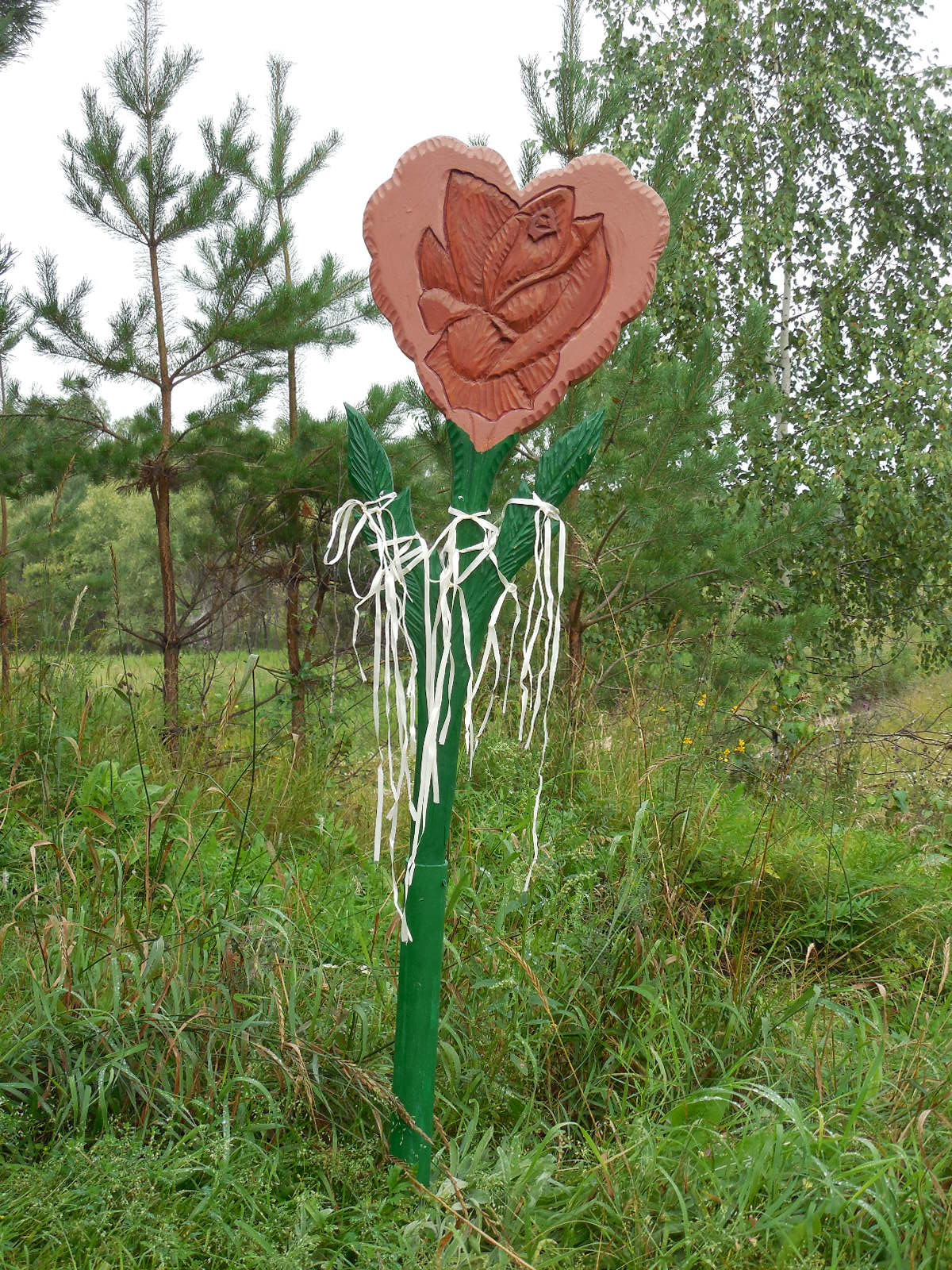

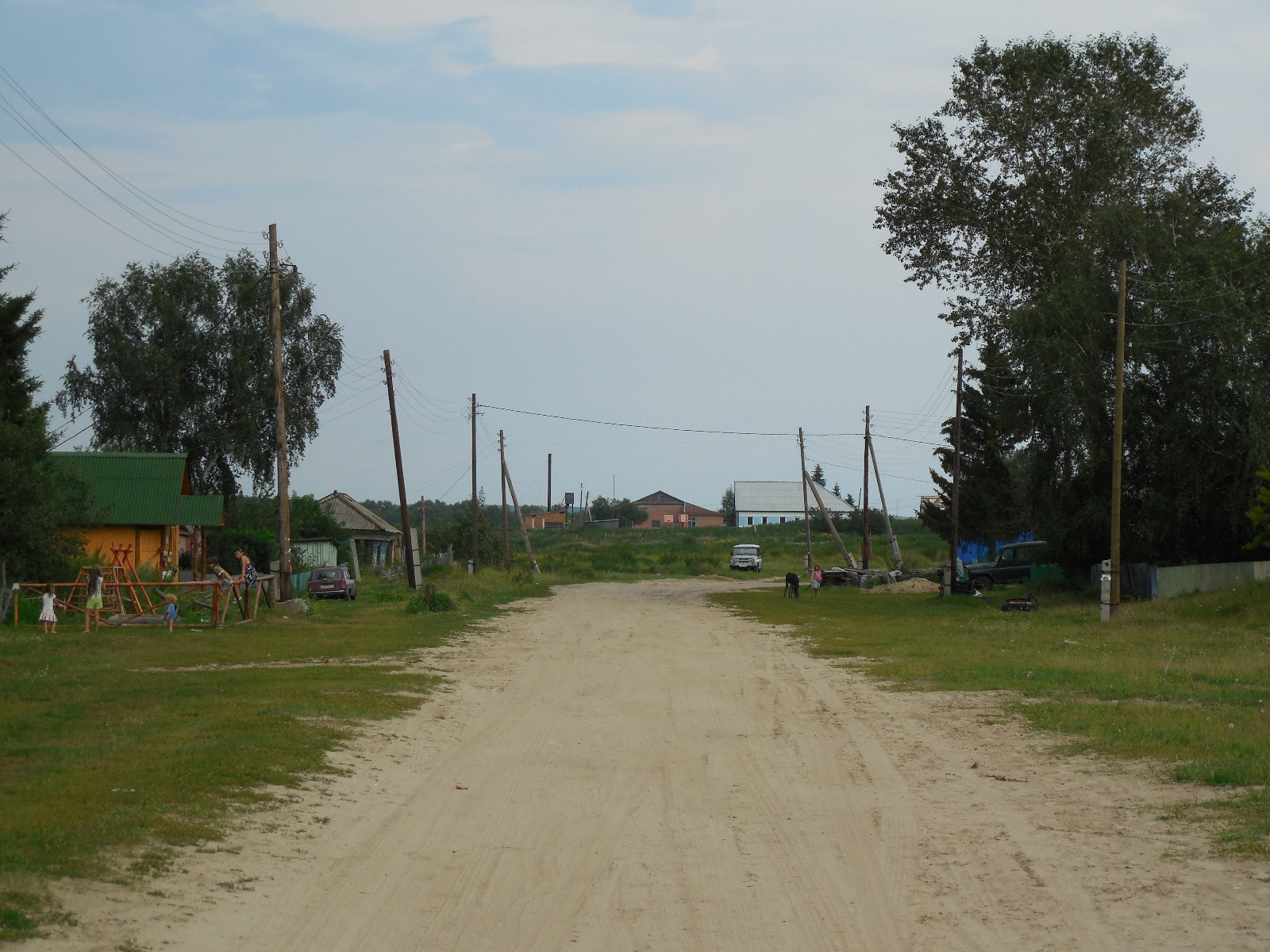

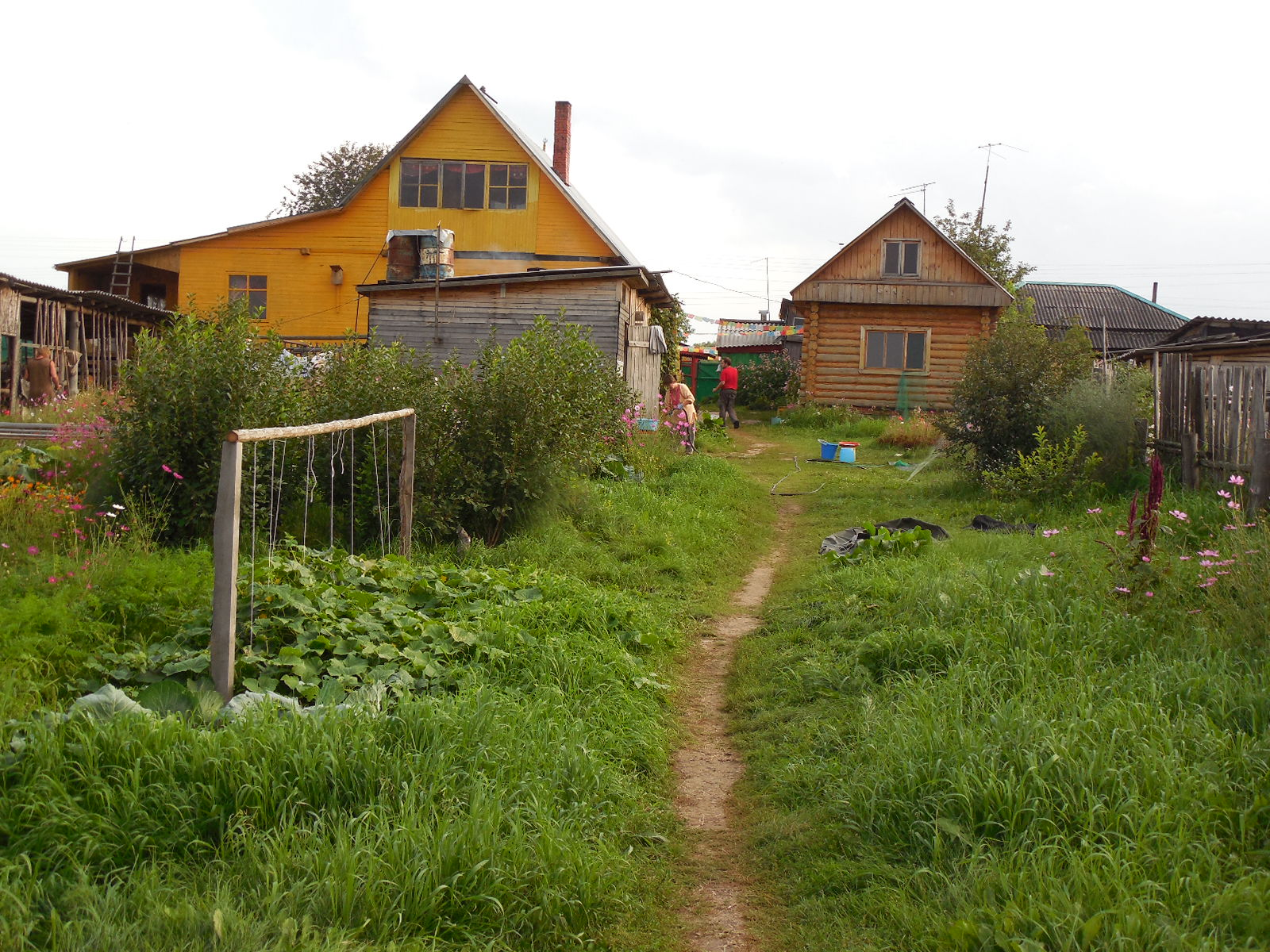

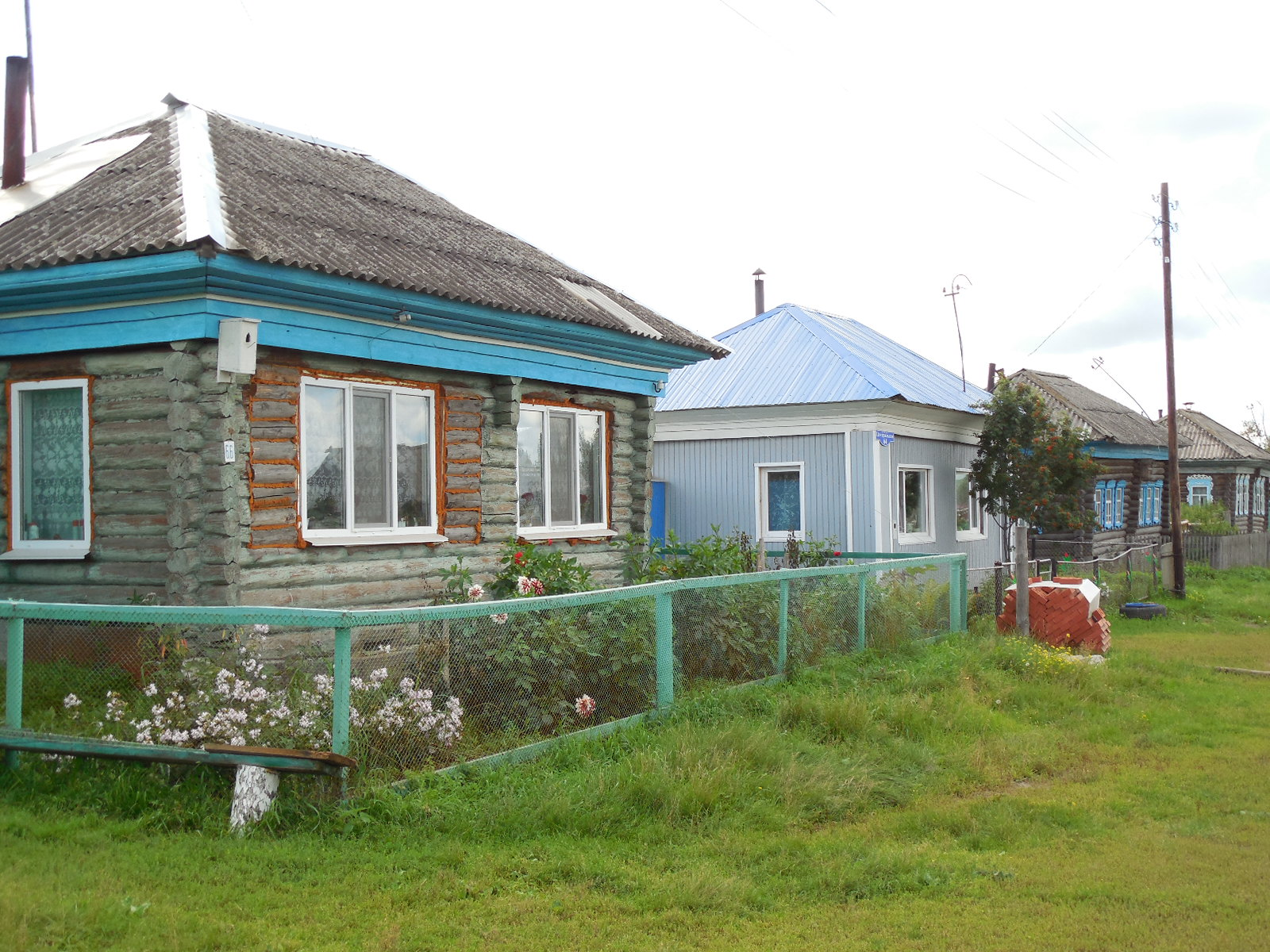

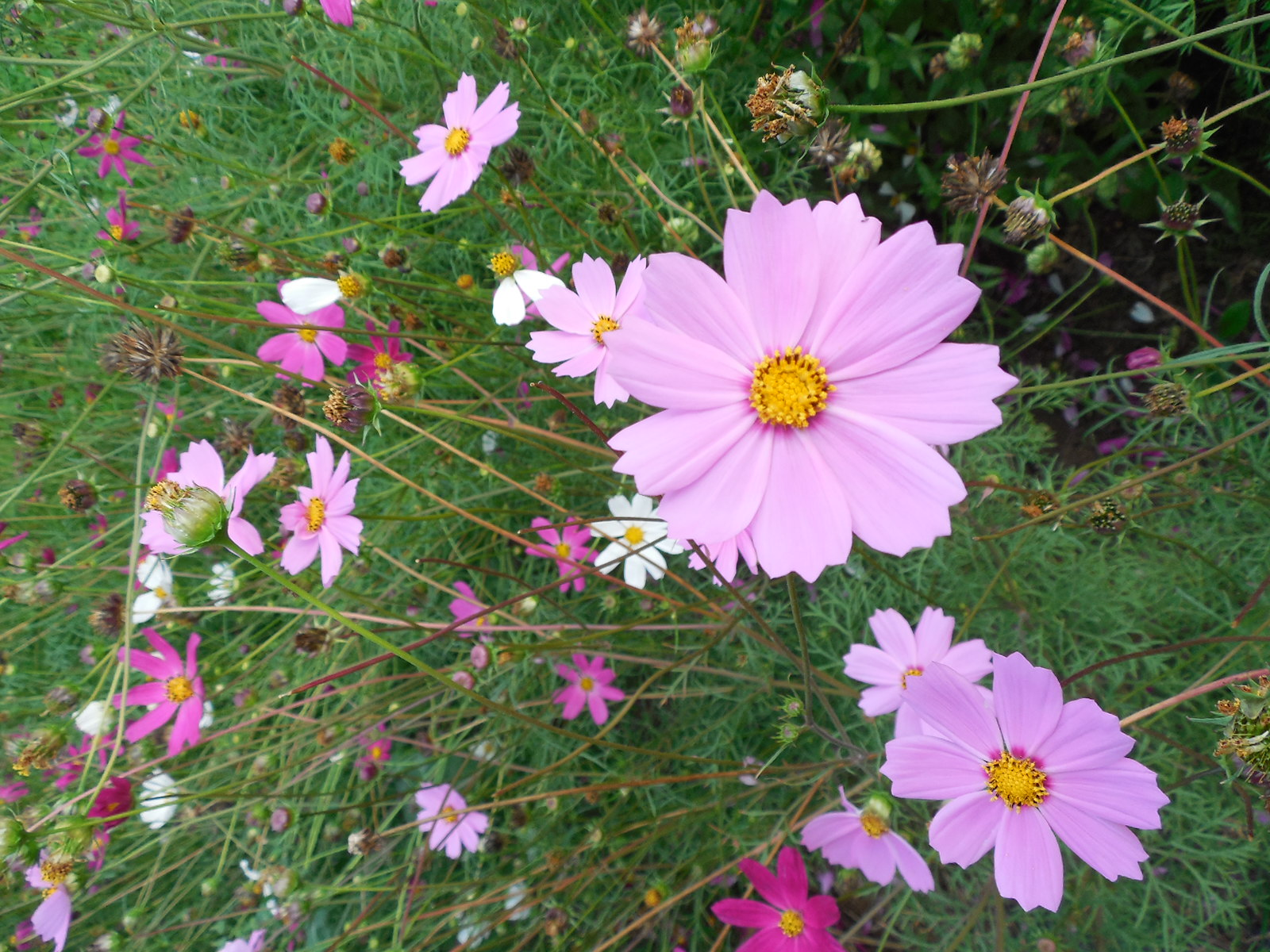

== Sources ==
- Golovneva, Elena (2015). "Inventing the Sacred Place: The Case in Western Siberia". Journal of Siberian Federal University. Humanities & Social Sciences. 8 (6). Krasnoyarsk: Siberian Federal University: 1086–1093. doi:10.17516/1997-1370-2015-8-6-1086-1093. ISSN 1997-1370.
- Golovneva, Elena; Shmidt, Irina (2015). "Religious Conversion, Utopia and Sacred Space (Okunevo Village in Western Siberia)". State, Religion and Church. 2 (2). Moscow: Russian Presidential Academy of National Economy and Public Administration: 54–76. ISSN 2311-3448.
- Shevtsova, Daria (March 11, 2020). "The Siberian Village of Okunevo: Fieldnotes from a Place of Power". New Age in Russia — Ideologies, Networks, Discourses. Johannes Gutenberg University of Mainz. doi:10.58079/sbkv. Archived from the original on November 4, 2020.
