= Circle of Pagan Tradition =

One of the Rodnovery associations in Russia, Ukraine and Belarus

Circle of Pagan tradition

Founder
- "Circle of Bera" (A. E. Nagovitsyn - Velemudr, D. A. Gavrilov - Iggeld, K. V. Begtin - Ogneyar), "Moscow Slavic Pagan Community" (S. Ignatov), "Kolyada" community (A. Potapov - Mezgir, N. N. Speranskiy - Velimir), etc.

Regions with significant populations
- Moscow, Russia

Religions
- Rodnovery

The "Circle of Pagan Tradition" ("CPG") is one of the Russian Slavic Native Faith associations.

== History ==
"Circle of Pagan Tradition" arose in 2002. The beginning of its creation was laid back in 2000, when in Kolomenskoye (Moscow) was signed the first official document - the "Kolomenskoye Appeal", in which were fixed vech principle of intra- and intercommunity relations, which became the basis for the creation of the CPG Council.

March 17, 2002 at the temple in Bittsevo Forest Park (Moscow) heads of 15 pagan communities and organizations have been signed Bittsevo agreement on the creation of the "Joint Pagan Tradition Circle of Zhretses-Volhovsky Council". Attached to the agreement was the "Bitza appeal" - a declaration of the basic provisions of the ideology of the Association of Rodnovers. The appeal states that "Pagans are people of the same language, belonging to one Traditional culture, one clan-tribe". The Pagan "honors their gods (Deified ancestors are euhemerical gods, and we are their descendants - 'grandchildren'. However, there are Gods as fundamental Forces of the World) - forefathers, the knowledge of which is revealed by the gods to him personally.".

The initiators of the association were the leaders of the Moscow and Moscow region neo-pagan groups: "Circle of Bera" (A. E. Nagovitsyn - Velemudr, D. A. Gavrilov - Iggeld, K. V. Begtin - Ogneyar), "Moscow Slavic Pagan Community" (S. Ignatov), "Kolyada" community (A. Potapov - Mezgir, N. N. Speranskiy - Velimir), etc.

At its dawn, the KJT numbered up to 500 activists. Its first head was elected the magician Ognejar (K. Begtin), and his deputy was the priest Mlad (S. Ignatov), although some authors name other personalities.

In February 2014, the association urged its supporters to support Prince Prophetic Oleg, as well as generals and marshals - heroes of the Patriotic Wars of 1812 and 1941-1945 in the nationwide voting "The Name of Victory.

== Doctrine ==
"The Circle of Pagan Tradition" defines itself as "an international social movement that historically emerged on the basis of the Bitza Address and the Bitza Treaty of 2002, adopted by a number of associations of supporters of the Slavic Clan Faith, Northern Tradition, common Indo-European, Aryan, Vedic Tradition."

One of the motivations for the creation of the CPG was to disassociate itself from national-chauvinism. A characteristic feature of the line of Rodnovery represented by the CPG is the understanding of Rodnovery as a "religion of nature" with its inherent tolerance and ideas of natural diversity.

Declared goals of the association (2004):

- The revival and dissemination in the countries where the members of the movement operate of the "native folk beliefs, traditions, worldviews, the natural way of life of their peoples;
- state recognition of "traditional Pagan beliefs" in accordance with their self-determination, protection of the rights of "Pagans" and their associations;
- the invocation of "Native and Natural" values, principles and methods for the benefit of their country, the Earth and the "human race".

The organization operates on the basis of the "Pagan Tradition Manifesto," repeatedly reprinted in Russia, Belarus, Ukraine, and Lithuania.

The CPG claims to welcome all Indo-European "natural-mythological" beliefs. The organization has communities and groups of believers in "Hellenic" and "Eddic" gods in addition to Slavic ones. When in 2007 in Kolomenskoye, in honor of Yakutia's accession to Russia, a Yakutian capitol was established, the CPG priests, in the absence of an officially recognized capital for persons of "Slavic faith" in the same capital, began to conduct their annual calendar rituals there.

Currently, within the "Slavic Native Belief" subculture, united by information infrastructure, reverence for common deities, rituals, and a sense of opposition to globalism, the CPG along with "Union of Slavic Native Belief Communities" (URC) is a movement that seeks to unite disparate communities and individual neo-pagans.

In August 2008, after an act of vandalism at one of the temples, four associations, the "Union of Slavic Communities of Slavic Native Faith" (SSO SRV), "Circle of Pagan Tradition" (CPG), "Veles Circle" and "Schoron ezh Sloven" (Vladimir Golyakov - Bogumil II), began to come together by creating an Advisory Council of the four associations. It consisted of two representatives from each association, including Vadim Kazakov and Maxim Ionov (priest Beloyar) from SSO SRV, Dmitry Gavrilov (sorcerer Iggeld) and Sergey Dorofeev (sorcerer Veledor) from CPG, and D. Hasanov (sorcerer Bogumil) from "Veles' circle". The ground for this was a joint statement against the desecration of sacred places revered by pagans, as well as the rejection of what they called "pseudo-paganism". In 2011, Schoron Žensen voluntarily left the Council.

In December 2009, the SRV and the KNT issued a joint statement condemning the authors of Valery Chudinov, Nikolai Levashov, Gennady Grinevich, Alexander Khinevich, Alexei Trekhlebov:

The views they declare, although they are the authorship of those citizens or their deliberate provocation, are presented as examples of pagan views and pagan worldviews. We cannot separate the ideological and circumscientific views of these individuals and their followers. Moreover ... We consider it our duty to warn all supporters of Pagan worldview that when reading the books of the named authors they can be misled by the theories, disguised as science, which are set forth in the works of the mentioned persons. This is pseudo-pagan doctrine, pseudo-linguistics, pseudo-science, and outright speculation. In the end, all of this leads only to the discrediting of both the modern Pagan movement and Russian science.

According to the religious scholar A. V. Gaidukov, this appeal is an attempt by some Rodnovers to protect themselves from radical manifestations of nationalism or "esoteric deviations.

In May 2012, the SSO SRV, the Commonwealth of Communities "Velesov Krug" and the CPG signed an agreement "On Slavic Priests", in which, in particular, they recognized pseudoscientific and harmful to the "Slavic faith" theories based on mythology and folklore A. I. Barashkov (Asova), V. Yu. Golyakov (Bogumil II), Yu. V. Gomonova, N. V. Levashova, A. V. Trekhlebov, V. A. Shemshuk; theories in the field of language, speech and traditional thinking by N N ashkevich, G.S. Grinevich, M. N. Zadornov, A. Yu. Khinevich, Valery Chudinov; theory in the field of history - Yu. D. Petukhova, A. A Tyunyaeva, A. T. Fomenko, as well as their successors, followers and the like.

The first paragraph of the same agreement states that only representatives of "Slavic people" can be Slavic priests and priestesses, and in exceptional cases other bearers of "Indo-European tribal heritage and custom" who have adopted Slavic language, culture and "Native Faith" and have proven to be "Slavs".

In December 2013, the SRV, Veles Circle, and CPG condemned the leader of the "Ukrainian religious sect" Rodovoye Ognische Slavyanskoe Rodnoi Vera, Vladimir Kurovsky.

According to the "Word of the Veche Center and the Commonwealth of Pagan Associations" (2016), the representatives of the association consider "Paganism," "Tradition," "Natural Tradition," and "Natural Faith" to be identical».

On August 27, 2016 in Kolomenskoye (Moscow) there was a meeting of eighteen wise men and priests - representatives of several neo-pagan associations - Slavic, "Hellenic", North German, and followers of "European Witchcraft". The meeting was preceded by a long preliminary discussion by a working group of the vital problems of the neo-pagan movement. Represented at the meeting were: "Pagan Federation International" (PFI), SRV SSO, CPG, "Veles Circle", "Moscow House Wiccan", the Olympic Religious League "Liberation of Mind", the almanac "Saga" ("project of the Union of Free Asatru"), the "Assembly of Slavic communities Native Land". The "Veche Center of Pagan Associations" was formed, and in the following months its conceptual documents were adopted. This collegial body, which includes 24 neo-pagan figures, includes 7 representatives of CPG. It is proposed "to create a Commonwealth of associations (followers of the Natural Faith) in Russia, Belarus and other countries, united by a common historical and cultural space".

== See also. ==
- Union of Slavic Native Belief Communities
- Veles circle

== Bibliography ==
Научная

- Гайдуков, A. B. (2016). "Новое язычество, неоязычество, родноверие : проблема терминологии". Язычество в современной России : опыт междисциплинарного исследования. Н. Новгород: Мининский университет, Типография Поволжье. pp. 24–46.
- Кавыкин, О. И. (2007). "Родноверы". Самоидентификация неоязычников в современной России (PDF). М.: Институт Африки РАН. ISBN 978-5-91298-017-6.
- Полиниченко, Д. Ю. (2012). "Неоязычество и любительская лингвистика в современной России" (PDF) (12) (Язык и культура. Научный интернет-журнал Центра исследования лингвокультурологии и переводоведения Философского факультета Прешовского университета в Прешове ed.).
- Шнирельман, В. А. (2012). Русское родноверие : неоязычество и национализм в современной России. М.: Библейско-богословский институт святого апостола Андрея. ISBN 978-5-89647-291-9.
- Indigenous religions. "Русь Языческая": этническая религиозность в России и Украине XX—XXI вв. Нижний Новгород: НГПУ. 2010.

Аффилированная

- "Изведник русского язычества". Вестник традиционной культуры. Вып. 1. М.: Издатель А. В. Воробьёв. 2003. ISBN 5-93883-029-X.
- "Соглашение «О жрецах славянских» от 23 мая 2012 года". Вестник традиционной культуры славян : сборник. Минск. 2013. pp. 114–116.

== Links ==
- Aitamurto, Kaarina (2007). "Russian Rodnoverie: Negotiating Individual Traditionalism". The 2007 International Conference. Globalization, Immigration, and Change in Religious Movements. June 7—9, 2007. Bordeaux, France. CESNUR.
- А. Белов. Язычество как феномен современной российской религиозности. Часть третья // Credo.RU
- Шнирельман В. А. Неоязычество и национализм. Восточноевропейский ареал
- Васильев М. А.: Неоязычество на постсоветском пространстве (Рец. на: Неоязычество на просторах Евразии. М., 2001) // Славяноведение. 2002. № 4. С. 102.
- Информационный портал Круга Бера
- "Битцевское Обращение 17 марта 2002". Содружество Природной Веры «Славия». 2002.
- "Официальное заявление Круга Языческой Традиции и Союза Славянских Общин Славянской Родной Веры от 25 декабря 2009 года «О подменах понятий в языке и истории славян и о псевдоязычестве»". Союз славянских общин славянской родной веры. 2009.
- Белояр, Богумил, Иггельд (2013). "Информационное письмо "Совета Трёх" славянских языческих объединений в связи с видеовыступлением лидера РО СРВ (РПВ) В. Куровского". Велесов круг. 11.12.2013.
- "Слово о Вечевом центре и Содружестве языческих объединений (27.08.2016, Коломенское, г. Москва)". Союз Славянских Общин Славянской Родной Веры. 31.08.2016. 2016.
- "Информационная группа Вечевого центра (ИВЦ)". vk.com. 2021.
