= Book of Veles =

Literary forgery

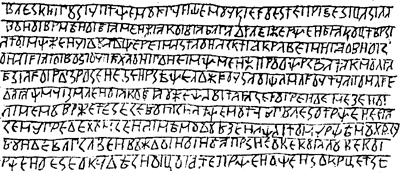
The only known contour copy of a plank; the book is named after this plank, as it begins with "To Veles this book we devote..."

The Book of Veles (also called the Veles Book, Vles book, Vlesbook or Isenbeck's Planks; Ukrainian: "Велесова книга"; Russian: "Велесова книга", "Велес книга", "Книга Велеса", "Дощечки Изенбека") is a literary forgery purporting to be a text of ancient Slavic religion and history supposedly written on wooden planks.

It contains what purport to be historical accounts interspersed with religious passages - some of a didactic, moralising character. The book refers to supposed events, the earliest of which would, if real, be datable to around the 7th century BC while the latest would have occurred around the 9th century AD.

The book was allegedly discovered in 1919 and lost in 1941. It is widely believed by scholars to be a forgery made in the 1940s–1950s, or less likely, in the early 19th century. The most decisive evidence for this is the language of the text, which is a mixture of different modern Slavic languages, with erroneous and invented linguistic forms and no regular grammar. Moreover, different modern editions of the book have different versions of the text. Regardless, some Slavic neopagans use it as a sacred text.

== Authenticity ==
Most of the scholars that specialize in the field of mythological studies and Slavic linguistics (such as Boris Rybakov, Andrey Zaliznyak, Leo Klejn, and all Russian academic historians and linguists) consider it a forgery. According to these scholars the thorough analysis of the book shows that it was written sometime in the 20th century. The history of the book can be reliably traced only as far as the mid-1950s, when the transcribed book and the photograph of one of the planks first appeared in a San Francisco-based, Russian émigré newspaper. Several scholars believe that the entire book is a product of collaboration of the editors of this newspaper and Yuriy Mirolyubov, who later claimed to have found the book. Others believe that either the entire book or the only plank available, were forged in the early 19th century by the Russian collector and forger Alexander Sulakadzev.

The book is written in a language using for the most part Slavic roots and different affixes found also in old East Slavic. Consequently, a large part of the book's text, once transcribed into a modern alphabet, is readable (albeit with some difficulty) by modern speakers of Slavic languages. However, professional linguists and historians, particularly the specialists in ancient Slavic, question many features of its language — vocabulary (modern or medieval Slavic words occasionally and unwittingly used in place of their ancient equivalents), spelling, phonetics (distinct reflections of the nasal vowels, both following Polish and Serbian patterns in different places, the haphazard handling of reduced vowels, etc., etc.), grammar (grammatical forms incompatible with early Slavic languages, combinations of affixes that contradict each other in meaning), etc. These features seem to indicate that the text was artificially "aged" by someone with superficial knowledge of ancient Slavic, and cannot be adequately translated because of lack of any consistent grammar system. In the words of the philologist O.V. Tvorogov:

This analysis leads us to a definite conclusion: we are dealing with an artificial language, "invented" by a person unacquainted with the history of Slavic languages and one who could not create his own language system.

In Ukraine, whereas scholars agree that the book is a hoax, it became very popular among politicians who consider it genuine and believe it describes real historical facts relevant for establishing Ukrainian ethnicity. In particular, Levko Lukyanenko cited the Book of Veles as historical. In 1999, the book was included in the high school program in Ukraine as a genuine literary and historical piece. Whereas the inclusion was considered controversial in academic circles, the book remained on the program as of 2008.

== Purported description ==
=== History of the book's discovery according to Mirolyubov ===
In 1919, a lieutenant of the White Russian Army, Fedor Arturovich Izenbek, found a bunch of wooden planks written in strange script in a looted mansion of Kurakins near Kharkiv (Ukraine). After the defeat of the Army, Isenbeck immigrated to Belgrade, where in 1923 he unsuccessfully tried to sell the planks to the Belgrade library and museum. In 1925 he settled in Brussels, where he gave the planks to Yuriy Mirolyubov, who was the first to study them seriously. Izenbek treated the planks very carefully, did not allow them to be taken out of his house and refused a suggestion by a professor of University of Brussels to hand them over for studying. Later this refusal to permit others to study these texts would lead people to suspect them as forgeries.

For fifteen years Mirolyubov restored, photographed, transcribed (as photographs proved to be unreadable) and finally translated the text. He managed to transcribe most of the planks.

In August 1941 Nazi Germany occupied Brussels, Izenbek died and the planks were lost. Mirolyubov immigrated to the United States and passed the materials in 1953 to professor A. A. Kurenkov (Kur) who then published them in the magazine Zhar-Ptitsa (Жар-птица, "Firebird") from March 1957 until May 1959. Later the text was studied by Sergey Paramonov (Lesnoy).

=== Planks ===
The planks were alleged to be 38 cm wide, 22 cm in height and about 0.5 cm thick. The edges and surfaces of the planks are uneven and near the top there are two holes for joining the planks. The text is carved into the planks and later covered with some coloring. Text alignment lines (roughly straight and parallel) are drawn across the planks and the tops of letters are aligned with these lines. The text is written below the lines, rather than above. The size and shape of the letters are different, suggesting that more than one person wrote the text. Some planks were partially or mostly rotten.

=== Contents ===
According to the Book of Veles, in the 10th century BC ("thirteen hundred years before Ermanaric"), pre-Slavic tribes lived in the "land of seven rivers beyond the sea" (possibly corresponding to Semirechye, southeastern Kazakhstan). The book describes the migration of the Slavs through Syria and eventually into the Carpathian Mountains, during the course of which they were briefly enslaved by the king "Nabsur" (Nabonassar?). They settled in the Carpathian Mountains in the 5th century BC ("fifteen hundred years before Dir"). Several centuries appear to pass without much commotion. The 4th century is described in some detail: during this time the Slavs fought a number of wars with the Goths, Huns, Greeks, and Romans. Many references to Ermanaric and his relatives are present (placing this section of Book of Veles in the same historical context as the story of Jonakr's sons, referenced in numerous European legends and sagas). The Slavs eventually emerged victorious. The period of the 5th to 9th centuries is described briefly; Khazars and Bulgars are mentioned.

The book ends with the Slavic lands descending into disarray and falling under Norman rule.

=== Excerpts ===
==== Plank 2/B ====
We were forced to retreat to woods and live as hunters and fishermen. So we could
get away from danger. We survived one darkness and started to build cities
and houses everywhere. After the second darkness there was great frost and we moved
to south for many places there were grassy ... and then Romei were taking our cattle
at a good price and were true to their word. We went
to southern ... greengrassland and had a lot of cattle ...

==== From Plank 7/A ====
Enemies are not as numerous as we are, for we are Rus' and they are not.

==== Plank 11/A ====
We pray and bow to the first Triglav and to him we sing a great glory.
We praise Svarog, grandfather of gods who is to whole gods' kin forefather
and creator of everything living, eternal spring that flows in the summer
and everywhere and in winter and never it freezes. And with that living water he nourishes
and life gives to us until we reach the blessed fields of paradise. And to god Perun, the thunderer, god of battle and fight we say:
"You hold us in life by neverending turning of the circle and lead to path
of Prav through battles to Great Trizna". And all who got killed in the battle -
may they live forever in the Perun's regiment. To god Svetovid glory we
are exalting for he is the god of Prav and Jav and to him we sing the song for he is the light
with which we see the world. We are looking and in Jav we are, and he from Nav
guards us and therefore praise we sing him. We sing and dance to him and call
god of ours to Earth, Sun and stars constantly in light keeps.
And glory all to Svetovid, god of ours that
hearts ours opens for us to admit bad deeds ours
and to good we turn. May he hug us like children for this has been said:
what is created with half of the mind could not be seen,
for it is a great secret how can Svarog be at the same time both Perun and Svetovid.
Two beings in skies Belobog and Crnobog are
And both of them Svarog holds and commands them.
After them come Hors, Veles and Stribog and then Visenj, Lelj and Letic.

==== From Plank 26/B ====
...As time passes, we come to the blue river as time ours
is not endless. There we meet
forefathers our and mothers that in Svarga herds are grazing and trusses
fastening. Their life is just as ours, only there are no Huns nor
Greeks...

==== From Plank 16 (sample text) ====
First two lines, literal text:

влескнигусіуптщемокіуншемоукіекоестепрібезищасіла
воноіврмѣноібяменжякоібяблгадблѣіжерщенбящотцврсі

Probable spacing (Mirolyubov):

влескнигу сіу птщемо кіу ншемо у кіе ко есте прібезища сіла.
во ноі врмѣноі бя менж якоі бя блга дблѣ іже рщен бящ отц врсі.
[vlesknigu etu ptshchemo kiu nshemo u kie ko este pribezishcha sila.
vo noi vrmenei bya menzh yakoi bya blga dble izhe rshchen byashch otc vrsi.]

Modern Russian interpretation:

Велесову книгу эту посвящаем богу нашему, который есть наше прибежище и сила (lit. в боге котором есть прибежище и сила).
В оные времена был муж, который был благ и доблестен, и назван [он] был отцом тиверцев.
[Velesovu knigu etu posvyashchaem bogu nashemu, v boge kotorom est' pribezhishche i sila.
V onye vremena byl muzh, kotoryj byl blag i doblesten, i nazvan byl otcom tivercev.]

Translation into English:

This book of Veles we dedicate to our god, in whom is [our] refuge and [our] strength. In those years there was a man, who was good and valiant, and [he] was called the father of Tiverians.

== Influence ==
=== Soviet era ===
The Book of Veles is used as a source for various pseudo-historical ideas; a large number of fake publications are based on it - works in which the fake is considered by the authors of these works as a reliable source. Large-scale production and active dissemination of counterfeits and their propaganda and advertising in the media introduce scientifically designed false information into the public consciousness. Such pseudo-historical ideas also influence the educational and research process through secondary, secondary specialized, and higher educational institutions and the scientific environment by issuing educational and methodological literature, which includes the Book of Veles without scientific commentary or recommends it for study as a historical monument. Secondary education is most susceptible to the expansion of this falsified information due to the lack of a unified school curriculum. In particular, there is a replacement of textbooks and teaching aids for fake publications.

The Book of Veles is mentioned in the 1971 program article Vityazi by the Soviet poet Igor Kobzev, who was fond of Russian paganism and contrasted it with Christianity, which allegedly caused irreparable harm to the original Russian culture. The article was directed against the distortions of the Russian language and Russian history by some ill-wishers, while, according to Kobzev, "the Russian people, like the Russian language, have infinitely deep roots that go back to the foggiest distances of millennia." In 1977, Kobzev demanded the publication of the texts of the Book of Veles and, in 1982, published poetic "translations" of its passages.

The controversy in the USSR around the Book of Veles began with an article by neo-pagan authors Valery Skurlatov and N. Nikolayev, published in 1976 in the popular weekly newspaper Nedelya. These authors argued that the work allegedly represents a "mysterious chronicle," allowing a fresh look at the time of the emergence of Slavic writing, revising scientific ideas about ethnogenesis, the level of social development, and the mythology of the Slavs. Also in 1976, Nedelya published enthusiastic reviews of the Book, which accused others of trying to keep readers and writers away from the work by ignoring it.

Ideas from the Book, such as Prav-Yav-Nav, were used by one of the founders of Russian neo-paganism, Valery Yemelyanov (neo-pagan name - Velemir). In 1967, Emelyanov defended his Ph.D. thesis at the Higher Party School. A good knowledge of the Arabic language and the peculiarities of the service allowed him to get extensive contacts in the Arab world, including the most senior officials. From these sources, he drew his understanding of "Zionism." In the 1970s, Yemelyanov wrote the book Dezionization, first published in 1979 in Arabic in Syria in the Al-Baʽath newspaper at the behest of Syrian President Hafez al-Assad. Dezionization tells of the ancient civilization of the "Aryans-Veneti," the only autochthons of Europe, who lived in harmony with nature and created the first alphabet but were defeated by the Jews-"Zionists", hybrids of criminals of different races, created by Egyptian and Mesopotamian priests. Since then, the world has been doomed to the eternal struggle of two forces - nationalist patriots and "Talmudic Zionists".

According to Yemelyanov, a powerful tool in the hands of "Zionism" is Christianity, allegedly created by the Jews specifically to enslave other peoples. Many of Yemelyanov's ideas have become widespread in Slavic neo-paganism and the Russian far-right environment. Some of Yemelyanov's ideas from Dezionization were directly borrowed by the writer Yuri Sergeev. Under the influence of Yemelyanov, several marker terms entered the fantastic and parascientific literature about the ancient Slavs, the mention of which indicates to those in the know that they are talking about a specific ideology but allows them to avoid accusations of antisemitism or racism: "Scorched camp" (Palestine); "Siyan Mountain" (Zion); "Rusa Salem" (Jerusalem); steppe ancestors who traveled throughout Eurasia in ancient times; Khazaria as a parasitic state (Khazar myth), etc.

The writer Yuri Sergeyev proposed publishing the Book of Veles in the USSR, which caused a public discussion about this text in the autumn-winter of 1987-1988 on the pages of the weekly journal Book Review. In response, the philologist Nikolai Bogomolov (1987) explained the reasons for the inappropriateness of promoting a fake text and showed the complexity of studying Slavic mythology and the need for its critical scientific analysis. An interview was published with the linguist Lidiya Zhukovskaya (1988), who, in a popular form, outlined the arguments for the falseness of the Book of Veles.

=== Post-Soviet era ===
The Book of Veles continues to attract a wide readership. The growth of its popularity was observed in the 1990s - early 2000s. In the 1990s, the Book of Veles became popular in fantasy fiction.

Many neopagans consider the Book a sacred text on the history and religion of the ancient Slavs. Slavic neopaganism (rodnovery) borrowed the pantheon, the presentation of history, and pan-Slavic ideas from the Book of Veles. It is widely used as a historical source and a source of religious teaching in Slavic neopaganism and by representatives of some other new religious movements, including being the primary source of the doctrine of "Prav-Yav-Nav," which was developed in Slavic neopaganism. The Book of Veles tells about the philanthropy of the Slavic pagan religion, which allegedly did not know of bloody sacrifices. Lesnoy and Mirolyubov especially emphasized this idea. Many neopagan movements have adopted it. Some native faith communities in Russia borrowed individual fragments of the text of the Book of Veles when conducting rituals.

The Book of Veles defends "pagan values" from advancing Christianity, tells about the struggle of the Slavs with countless enemies (Goths and Huns), and promotes the idea of the unity of the Slavs. For these reasons, it was taken by Russian nationalists as a rallying cry in the face of a supposedly hostile Western world. The Book of Veles became the basis for Russian and Ukrainian neopagan nationalism.

Since the early 1980s, those who doubt the authenticity of the Book of Veles have been accused of "slandering Russian national history" and "hostility to everything Russian." Scientists who prove the falsity of the Book of Veles are accused of a lack of patriotism. Thus, Nikolai Slatin, a supporter of the authenticity of the Book of Veles and the author of his own "translation," who shares the "Hyperborean idea" of Valery Dyomin, tried to refute the arguments of scientists, in particular, reproaching them for their lack of patriotism.

Valery Skurlatov and Valery Yemelyanov were the most prominent popularizers of the Book of Veles and were leaders of nationalist movements, with Yemelyanov being one of the founders of Russian neopaganism. Gennady Grinevich, an amateur epigraphist, wrote that this was a "genuine book of the 9th century." The Book of Veles as an authentic Slavic and "Aryan" scripture is mentioned in the works of neopagan writers Sergei Alekseev (the novel series Treasures of the Valkyrie, since 1995), Yuri Sergeev (the novel Prince's Island, 1995, where the "Shine-Book" is named in consonance), and others and influenced the ideas of these works.

The Ukrainian author Boris Yatsenko considered the Book of Veles proof that in the early Iron Age, if not earlier, "one Slavic people, the Ukry," lived in Central Europe. The idea of the authenticity of the Book of Veles was shared by the painter Ilya Glazunov, who, on the whole, took traditional Orthodox positions but shared many ideas of Slavic neopaganism, including the "Aryan" idea.

In 1992, the neopagan writer Vladimir Shcherbakov published "translations" of some fragments of the Book of Veles. Shcherbakov presented himself as the first translator and researcher of this "Slavic monument" (which is not true). He considered the Book of Veles to be an authentic "priest book of the Slavic-Russians" (at first, he called it the "Swan Book"). He considered this text not as a work of the priests themselves, but as a revelation given from above, like the Judeo-Christian Bible: "Representations about the world and its structure in the Swan Book are so deep that they undoubtedly reflect the divine truth, the revelation that was bestowed on the Slavs." In this text, he confirmed some of his ideas about the ancient area and the ways of settler "proto-Europeans and Slavs." He did not mention that these ideas were influenced by Skurlatov's earlier works, also based on the Book of Veles. Shcherbakov borrowed his all-encompassing teaching about the Mother of God from these works.

There are various versions of the translation of the Book of Veles into modern Russian, as a rule, performed by non-professionals who do not have a philological education and experience in translation. The most famous are the "translations" made by Alexander Asov, who published many pseudoscientific works on history and mythology connected with the Book of Veles. Asov is well known as a neopagan writer and ideologue.

In 1992, Asov published the book Russian Vedas. Songs of the bird Gamayun. Book of Veles in the publishing house of the journal Science and Religion, where he was the editor of the department of the history of Slavs. The publication contains the text of the Book of Veles, made by the "Velesovitsa" with the translation of Asov, in the imprint named by the sorcerer Bus Kresen. This publication, with a circulation of many thousands and mailing to all libraries, became an informational reason for the massive widespread emergence of Rodnovery.

In general, Asov's editions of the Book of Veles, equipped with his "translation" and comments, have been published since the 1990s in large numbers. Some supporters of the authenticity of the Book of Veles (Boris Yatsenko) and supporters of the scientific point of view about the falsification of the work (Oleg Tvorogov, Anatoly Alekseyev) alike noted the arbitrariness of Asov’s interpretations in his "translations," unspecified changes to the spelling and the text of the Book itself, incompetence in Slavic grammar, etc. According to authors of other "translations" of the Book and supporters of its authenticity (Gennady Karpunin, Dmitry Dudko, Nikolai Slatin), Asov’s "translation" contains errors, prejudice, and fantasy.

The version of the Book of Veles published by Asov in the 1990s was declared by him to be the only correct translation of Mirolyubov's texts. However, in each new edition of the Asov translation (1994, 2000), this "canonical" text also changed. According to the historian Leo Klejn, Asov has created an entirely new Book of Veles.

Despite criticism, in most works of supporters of the authenticity of the Book of Veles, it is Asov's "translations" that are quoted, and reasoning is built on their basis. Notably, the "folklore" ideas of Mirolyubov and Asov were used in the pseudo-historical publication Russian Khazaria. A new look at history in 2001, compiled by Yuri Petukhov, a writer close to neopaganism. The authors suspect professional researchers of inconsistency and unsuitability. The publications of Asov and his like-minded people in the journal Science and Religion, as well as the Book of Veles, served as the main historical sources of the Slavic-Aryan Vedas, the writings of the neopagan movement of the Ynglists (most likely written by the founder and head of the movement, Alexander Khinevich, in collaboration with others). Ynglists consider "Old Russian Vedic writings" to be sacred, among which they include the Book of Veles, or "Russian Vedas" (Asov's version of the Book of Veles).

According to Asov, linguistic or historical arguments in assessing the authenticity of this text are secondary:

The main confirmation of authenticity ... comes from personal spiritual experience. The very spirit of the Book of Veles speaks of authenticity. Its mystical secret, the great magic of the word.

Based on the Book of Veles, Asov created the "Slavic Russian (Slavonic) idea," according to which the original "Vedic" tradition, in his opinion, preserved in the Book of Veles, underlies most modern religions that have distorted this tradition. Asov considers Jesus Christ a descendant of Arius Osednya, the grandson of Dazhbog, mentioned in the Book of Veles (a variation of Aryan Christianity). According to Asov:

The Vedists [who acknowledge the authenticity of the Book of Veles] believe (and know) that even before Jesus Christ, the Sons of God came to the Slavs and other peoples. The Messiah, the Son of God, also came 400 years after Christ.

This messiah is Prince Ruskolani Husband Right Bus Beloyar (Old Bus). The cross is considered a "Vedic" symbol. Bus spread the "Vedic faith" along with the teaching of Prav-Yav-Nav (how to follow the "Way of Rule"). Asov claims that every 532 years (the period in terms of the number of years corresponds to the Christian great indiction, but specific great indictions are not connected with Asov's chronology), a "great Teacher of the World" is born. Bus Beloyar was such a figure, who, according to Asov, was born on April 20, 295, then - Yagailo Gan (the figure "Yagailo Gan smerd" was invented by Alexander Sulakadzev), who compiled the Book of Veles ("we have the right to recognize such a Teacher creator of the VK [Book of Veles]"), a native of Poland, which is how Asov explains the Polonisms in her text (without explaining why Yagailo does not know Polish nasals well, inserting them out of place in the Book of Veles, and why Asov seeks to eliminate these Polonisms from the text). Asov wrote that Yagailo Gan was born in 791 (therefore, Bus and Yagailo are separated by 496 years, not the declared 532 years).

Asov wrote about the "ancient wars of the people of the white and black races in Europe" during the Late Paleolithic, the idea of which has a source in the esoteric concepts of anthropogenesis and corresponds to the idea of large-scale interracial wars defining the history, common in racist (including "Aryan") discourse. According to Asov, "it is necessary to awaken the dormant consciousness of the nation," and "Russian Vedic culture should and can take a place in world culture no less honorable than Indian Vedic culture." He offers modern Russia to accept the "Slavic-Aryan (Vedic)" idea nationally.

Asov distances himself from ultranationalists and fascists but supports speeches against "international Zionism." Asov uses occult ideas about the change from the "fierce age of Pisces" to the "happy age of Aquarius." He associates the constellation of Pisces with Israel and Christianity and the constellation of Aquarius with Russia. The omnipotence of evil and the treacherous Chernobog ("Prince of this World") are also associated with Israel and Christianity. The works of Asov or the ideas drawn from them are popular among some of the Rodnovers, who create their teachings on their basis.

Without real scientific arguments, Asov sharply criticizes Oleg Tvorogov and other scientists who deny the authenticity of the Book of Veles. He completely rejects the competence of Tvorogov (Tvorogov was the most prominent researcher and publisher of monuments of ancient Russian literature).

In the 1990s, there were heated debates among Russian Rodnovers about the authenticity of the Book and the possibility of its use in rituals. In the 2010s, their attitude towards this work became calmer. The St. Petersburg Union of Veneti, focusing on the translations of the Book of Veles made by Ukrainian Canadian emigrants, preferred the interpretations of one of the founders of Ukrainian and Slavic neopaganism, Professor Volodymyr Shayan, rather than Lev Silenko and the Ukrainian neopagan Native Ukrainian National Faith he created, which have more clear anti-Russian views. To date, among a significant part of the Rodnovers, the point of view prevails that, despite the falsity of the Book of Veles, its author conveyed some echoes of tradition.

Supporters of the authenticity of the Book of Veles are, in particular, the author of pseudo-historical ideas about the history of the Ukrainian people, Boris Yatsenko (magazine Chronicles 2000, No. 3-4, 1994; No. 1997); Doctor of Historical Sciences, a specialist in agrarian history and social and political processes of the modern history of Ukraine Petro Panchenko; and Doctor of Philology and researcher of ancient Russian literature Yury Begunov (Myths of the Ancient Slavs, Saratov, 1993), who in the 1990s spoke mainly with nationalist and conspiracy journalism. From the point of view of academician Andrey Zaliznyak, concerning these authors, "we are actually talking about people who only admit some doubt about the falsity of the Veles Book, and do not directly and reasonably defend the version of its authenticity."

One of the first publishers of the Book of Veles, biologist Sergey Paramonov (under the pseudonym Sergey Lesnoy), wrote:

This is a wholly unstudied and only 3/4 recently published source – apparently, the chronicle of pagan Russian priests, beginning with events long before our era and brought to Askold and Dir, but not capturing Oleg at all. This is apparently the oldest Russian original source that we have. It was written, in essence, in an unknown Slavic language, which presents great difficulties for our current understanding. It sets out both the events already mentioned in history and, in most cases, recorded for the first time because it concerns an era that was not at all affected by the annals of Nestor.

Most supporters of the authenticity of the Book of Veles attribute it to the 8th-9th centuries and believe that Mirolyubov had access to the original of this time directly.

Boris Yatsenko took a peculiar position. He attributed the creation of the Book of Veles to the end of the 9th - the beginning of the 10th century, but, unlike most other supporters of the authenticity of this work, he believed that the protographer of the famous text of the Book of Veles was created not in Novgorod, but in Western Polesia, reflecting the dialect features of this region, later than the time to which supporters of authenticity usually date it, and the list (plates) that has come down to Mirolyubov belongs to the 17th century and was created by a Ukrainian. Yatsenko criticizes philologists Zhukovskaya and Tvorogov: Yatsenko explains the inconsistencies in the language of the Book of Veles noted by them with the complex history of its text and inclusions of different times.

Critics of Yatsenko’s version, Tvorogov and Zaliznyak, note that Yatsenko’s hypothesis about the history of the text of the Book of Veles does not clarify the unsystematic nature of morphology and syntax noted by critics (which is not characteristic of Slavic languages of any period), the formation of erroneous forms based on the model of different languages, absolute incompatibility with the grammar of Slavic texts of the 9th-17th centuries, and the unusual creation of copies of a pagan text in "pre-Cyrillic writing" on tablets in such an era as the 17th century. Anatoly Alekseyev notes that Yatsenko did not address grammar issues in his linguistic analysis. According to Alekseyev, Yatsenko's work fulfills a "national order" in Ukraine since it was published at the expense of I. G. Kislyuk, whose biography, together with a portrait, completes the publication, and it is also reported that the philanthropist considers the Book of Veles "sacred for our people" and that "Ivan Kislyuk and his like-minded people stubbornly spread national ideas and assets among the turbulent sea of low-quality foreigners."

Some supporters of the authenticity of the Book of Veles consider Mirolyubov's readings, the language of which contains inconsistencies noted by scientists, as well as translations based on Mirolyubov's text, as erroneous and consider it necessary to reconstruct a different text based on their interpretation of the Book of Veles. This particular opinion is shared by Yury Begunov, who supports the reconstruction and translation of A. I. Umnov-Denisov under the title Prinikaniye carried out in this direction.

The ethnographer and candidate of historical sciences Svetlana Zharnikova, who developed a pseudoscientific arctic hypothesis of the origin of the Indo-Europeans ("Aryans"), was a supporter of the authenticity of the Book of Veles. Under the influence of Zharnikova, the neopagan writer Sergei Alekseyev released the novel series Treasures of the Valkyrie. Zharnikova is presented in the novels as a woman who found the Book of Veles on the White Sea.

The satirist and popularizer of neopagan ideas Mikhail Zadornov, who also shared the idea of the origin of the Slavs from the "Aryans" ("ancient Aryans"), declared the total authenticity of the Book. Zadornov did not distinguish between the Book of Veles and Etruscan inscriptions, arguing that the Etruscans, who, in his opinion, were Russian, wrote "on tablets."

The popular writer Yuri Nikitin, who reproduces in an artistic form the main ideas of Slavic neopaganism, uses the Book of Veles as one of the landmarks in history, from where he borrows ideas about the Slavs - the "grandchildren of Dazhdbog", their nomadic lifestyle in the endless steppes, and their ancient book culture.

Some authors who develop the Ukrainian version of the "Aryan" idea consider the Book of Veles a genuine historical source. Nikolai Chmykhov, an archaeologist and doctor of historical sciences, considered it genuine. Vitaly Dovgich, a journalist and candidate of philological sciences, wrote that "the history of Indo-Europe begins in Ukraine," one of the proofs of which, in his opinion, is the Book of Veles. In 1995, Dovgich assisted Boris Yatsenko in publishing the Book of Veles as a special issue of the Indo-Europe magazine (of which Dovgich is editor-in-chief). In this edition, Dovgych and Yatsenko argued that the Ukrainians descended from the ancient "Ukry," who settled in deep primitiveness from the Elbe to the Dnieper and Danube.

Yuri Shilov, an archaeologist by education and a candidate of historical sciences, quoted the Book of Veles based on Asov's translation and put forward his version of its origin: it "could have been created by the descendants of the priests of the Veneti-Etruscans at the end of the 9th century, somewhere in the Crimea." In his opinion, the Book of Veles reports on the "ancient civilization of Aratta," located on the territory of Ukraine and represented by the Tripillian culture. Following Shilov, Professor of the Precarpathian National University (Ivano-Frankivsk), philosopher L. T. Babiy argues that Ukraine is the ancestral home of the "Aryans," "the creators of the Tripillia archaeological culture with the states of Aratta and Ariana." He considers the Book of Veles to be the "Ukrainian Bible" and, at the same time, "our Odyssey".

A well-known representative of the Russian nationalist movement, A. M. Ivanov (Skuratov), considered the Book of Veles to be a falsification. The neopagan ideologue Nikolai Speransky (Velimir) believes that Mirolyubov-Kura-Lesnoy's Book of Veles and Asov's Book of Veles were written not by the ancient wise men but by modern ones - he argues that this does not make them less interesting and less pagan, since it is important what they teach. In May 2012, three large native faith associations in Russia (Circle of Pagan Tradition, Union of Slavic Native Belief Communities, and Veles circle) recognized Asov's and other authors' mythology and folklore as pseudoscientific and harmful to the "Slavic faith." The Book of Veles was also firmly rejected by representatives of the Czech Rodnoverie Commonwealth "Native Faith". Donat Gasanov from the Veles circle considers the Book of Veles a creation of Mirolyubov but admits that divine inspiration could have descended on the latter when writing the text.

In some cases, the publishers of the Book of Veles attribute to scientists an opinion about its authenticity. Among the purported supporters of the authenticity of this work was academician Boris Rybakov. Thus, Asov wrote that Rybakov changed his mind about the Book of Veles after the publication of articles by Yury Begunov and publications and translations of Asov himself. These claims are unsupported. Asov also noted that Rybakov spoke out in support of his research in an article in Science and Religion (1992). However, Rybakov's cited note does not say anything about the authenticity of the Book of Veles.

Rybakov worked as part of a group of scientists from the USSR Academy of Sciences, which studied the issue of the Book's authenticity and concluded that it was fake. Asov writes that Rybakov's authorship in this publication was "essentially falsified" but leaves this claim without evidence. Rybakov did not share the idea of the authenticity of the Book of Veles even in the later period of his life: in a 1995 lecture, he calls it a fake of the 1950s, created by emigrants out of "patriotic" feelings and having no value; he named the only "photo" of the "tablet of the Book of Veles" as fake; Rybakov's son, historian Rostislav Rybakov, in an interview for Literaturnaya Gazeta, noted:

I remember the last meeting of the bureau of the department, at which Boris spoke. It was long, everyone was tired, and when he was given the floor, it was telegraphically short: "There are two dangers before historical science. The Book of Veles. And Fomenko." And sat down in his seat. In fact, it became his testament to us historians.

In 1997, Alexander Asov falsified the words of the historian Ivan Lyovochkin, who was critical of the Book of Veles: Asov cited Lyovochkin as a supporter of its authenticity.

Asov and neopagan author Valery Skurlatov, as well as O. Skurlatova and writer Yuri Petukhov (1990), attributed the belief in the authenticity of the Book of Veles to the archaeologist academician Artemiy Artsikhovsky (while Asov called Skurlatov "a candidate of historical and philosophical sciences", which is not true). This statement has no basis. Tvorogov wrote about this:

V. L. Yanin, a student and collaborator of A. V. Artsikhovsky, as well as Academician B. A. Rybakov, who knew him closely, never heard from the late archaeologist [Artsikhovsky] statements in favor of the VK [Book of Veles] (I was informed about this in B. A. Rybakov, D. S. Likhachev also specifically addressed a similar question to V. L. Yanin). And the message of O. Skurlatova that A. V. Artsikhovsky “considered it quite probable”, that VK “reflects the true pagan past of the Slavs”, appeared after the scientist's death and seems highly doubtful.

Asov also refers to a personal conversation with Rybakov but claims that he told him otherwise. Dmitry Loginov (a supporter of the authenticity of the Book of Veles) wrote:

Traditionally, among supporters of document's authenticity, it is believed that A. V. Artsikhovsky once spoke in favor of its authenticity. However, we can only guess about the nature and content of his words since the archaeologist did not devote a single work to the VK [Book of Veles], and indications of his positive assessment of the monument are somewhat similar to a historiographic myth.

== See also ==
- Oera Linda Book, a similar likely-forged document relevant to Germanic mythology
- Veles (god)
- List of Slavic pseudo-deities
