= Veles circle =

Slavic neo-pagan community

Commonwealth of Slavic Rodnovery communities

Total population
- 250

Founder
- Russian-Slavic Rodoliubie (Veleslav and the Obninsk community Triglav (D. A. Gasanov - Bogumil Murin)

Regions with significant populations
- Russia, Ukraine, Belarus

Religions
- Rodnovery

Languages
- Russian

Website
- velesovkrug.ru

The Circle of Veles (also known as the Commonwealth of Slavic Rodnovery Communities) is an association of neo-pagan communities dedicated to the revival and promotion of Slavic native spirituality. The association venerates Veles, the Slavic god of wisdom, and regards Rod as the supreme deity, aligning itself with the Rodnovery tradition.

The association emphasizes the veneration of earth deities, drawing parallels to Indian tantrism. It is not affiliated with any political movement and does not engage in racial or religious discrimination.

The leader of the association is Ilya Cherkasov, who goes by the name Veleslas. The Circle of Veles is governed by the Council of Volhvs, consisting of high priests and priests. The association has communities in several Russian cities, including Moscow, Obninsk, Kostroma, Ryazan, Perm, Kazan, and Komsomolsk-on-Amur, as well as in Ukraine and Belarus. Most participants in the association are volhvs.

== Overview ==
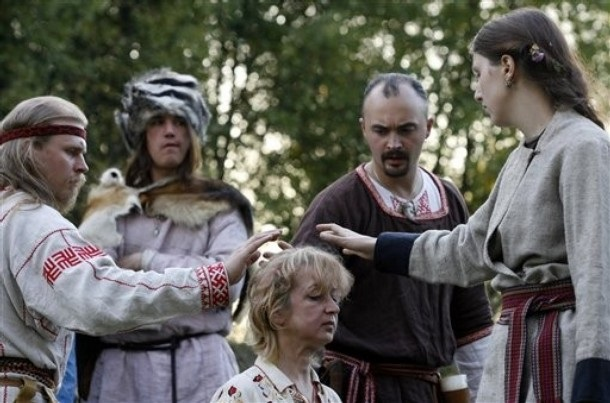
Rite of initiation (Veleslav, Bogumil, etc.)

The "Velesov Circle" was established in 1999 in Moscow. It is an association of communities dedicated to the development of Slavic spirituality, consciously distancing itself from political affiliations. The association venerates Veles, the Slavic god of wisdom, and regards Rod as the supreme deity.

The association's calendar dates back to 2409 B.C., marking the foundation of Slovensk the Great. Joint celebrations include Kupala, Perunov's Day and Koliada. In addition to Slavic traditions, the association also venerates Protopop Avvakum, a spiritual leader of the Old Believers, viewing them as a commitment to tradition and rebellion against the Antichrist.

The Kolomna Appeal (2000) established veche as the associations' leadership model. It describing the pagan community as an apolitical organization, while retaining control over ideological questions. The Appeal also emphasized tolerance for diversity, allowing terms such as "Paganism," "Rodnovery," "Vedism," "Ynglism," and "Orthodoxy" to be used to describe their faith.

Veleslav (Ilya Cherkasov), the head of the association and a volhv, is one of the most renowned figures in Slavic neo-paganism in Russia. He has appeared on several television programs. In 2003, he published "The Ritebook", which establishes a system of rituals. He also authored the doctrine of "Rodoliubie" (Russian: Родолюбие), described as the "original ancestral faith of the Russians." This doctrine advocated for a pantheistic belief in a single, all-encompassing god, Rod, grounded in a vedic worldview. It emphasized the veneration of ancestors, the division of society into castes, and a deep love for one's native land. The archetypes of the "One Tradition" are based on both the "Russian Slavic and Aryan spirit" and "traditional paganism," the latter incorporating the entire spiritual experience accumulated by humanity.

== History ==
=== Early history ===
In November 1993, the Obninsk Vedic community "Traiana", led by the Volhv Bogumil (D. A. Gasanov), formed the Circle of Veles as part of the Union of the Veneds. Gasanov received his initiation from Rodoliub (Rybin), a sorcerer from Nizhny Novgorod. Between 1994 and 1997, Gasanov maintained close relations with the Union of Veneds. Between 1994 and 1997, Gasanov maintained close relations with the Union of Veneds. Until the end of 1998, the "Traiana" community collaborated closely with the Kaluga Slavic community led by Vadim Kazakov, a disciple of Alexey Dobrovolsky (also known as Dobroslav).

In 1997, Kazakov became the leader of the Union of Slavic Native Belief Communities, which included Bogumil's own community. However, in December 1998, the community was expelled from the Union and subsequently renamed itself first as the Obninsk Slavic Community "Triglav", and later as the Obninsk Rodnovery Community "Triglav".

In February 1998, the Aryan Pagan community "Satya-Veda", which included Veleslav, began operations in Moscow. Satya-Veda was soon evolved into the Russian-Slavic Rodoliubie community, establishing close ties with Velimir's group. This collaboration led to their merger into the Rodoliubie – Kolyada Vyatichi Community Accord in 2001, though the groups eventually parted ways. In Moscow, until the mid-2000s, the "Moscow Velesov community" operated under the leadership of Volhv Velemir (A. Zhilko).

The "Velesov Circle" was established in 1999 in Moscow. The first communities to join were the Russian-Slavic Rodnovery community of Veleslav and the Obninsk Triglav community led by D. A. Gasanov (Bogumil Murin). Both communities later disbanded. Subsequently, five more communities joined, including the "Veles Community" of Volhv Velemir (A. Zhilko), which included Velemudr (Alexei Nagovitsyn).

=== Kolomna Appeal (2000) ===
On September 15, 2000 ("832 years from the fall of the Jaromarsburg") in Kolomenskoye (Moscow), seventeen communities, including the "Moscow Veles Community," Obninsk community "Triglav," community "Kolyada Vyatichi," Kirov community "Svetoslavichi," Vladivostok community "Shield of Semargl," and others, signed the Kolomna Appeal to all Pagan Communities of Russia and Neighboring Countries. This document established the status of the Pagan faith and regulated relationships between the communities. As a sign of agreement, a joint ritual was performed at the Alatyr Stone in the Veles tract near Kolomenskoye.

The Appeal advocated for the veche principle of leadership, describing the pagan community as a apolitical organization, while retaining control over ideological questions. It emphasized tolerance for diversity, allowing terms such as "Paganism," "Rodnovery," "Vedism," "Ynglism," and "Orthodoxy" to describe their faith. The Appeal also demonstrated a desire for unity and proclaimed "the inadmissibility of mutual blasphemy." It called for regular meetings during the Day of Slavonic Alphabet and encouraged the exchange of information.

=== Subsequent activity ===
In 2002, in memory of Academician B. A. Rybakov, whose controversial mythological constructions many Rodnovers use as a source, Veleslav published a brochure dedicated to "the revival of the original Russian-Slavic Rodnovery".

In 2005, Veleslav created the youth-oriented doctrine of Navoslavism, "The Way of the Left Hand," or "Shuyny Way".

In August 2008, after an act of vandalism at one of the temples, four associations, the "Union of Slavic Communities of Slavic Native Faith" (SSO SRV), "Circle of Pagan Tradition" (KJT), "Veles Circle", and "Schoron ezh Sloven", began to unite by creating an Advisory Council. It consisted of two representatives from each association, including Vadim Kazakov and Maxim Ionov (priest Beloyar) from SRV, Dmitry Gavrilov (sorcerer Iggeld) and Sergey Dorofeev (sorcerer Veledor) from KJT, and D. Hasanov (sorcerer Bogumil) from "Veles' circle". A joint statement was issued against the desecration of sacred places revered by pagans, as well as a rejection of what they called "pseudo-paganism". In 2011, the Schoron ezh Slovenes voluntarily left the council.

In May 2012, three neo-pagan associations in Russia—KNT, SSO SRV and "Veles Circle"—entered into an agreement "On Slavic priests". Among other things, the agreement recognized certain theories as "pseudoscientific and harmful to Slavic faith". These theories were based on mythology and folkloristics by such figures as A. I. Asov (Busa Kresenya), V. Yu. Golyakov (Bogumil the Second), Yu. V. Gomonov, N. V. Levashov, A. V. Trekhlebov, and V. A. Shemshuk. The agreement also rejected theories in the fields of language, speech, and traditional thinking proposed by N. N. Vashkevich, G. S. Grinevich, M. N. Zadornov, A. Y. Khinevich, V. A. Chudinov, as well as historical by Yuri D. Petukhov, A. Tyunyaev, A. T. Fomenko, among their successors, followers and their like".

The 2012 Agreement also stipulated that only representatives of "Slavic people" could serve as Slavic priests and priestesses. In exceptional cases, individuals from "Indo-European tribal heritage and custom" who had adopted the Slavic language, culture, and "Native Faith" and had demonstrated their belonging to "Slavicness" could also be considered.

In December 2013, the SRV, Veles Circle, and KJT condemned Vladimir Kurovsky, leader of the "Ukrainian religious sect" Rodovoye Ognische Slavyanskoe Rodnoi Vera (Slavic Native Faith).

On August 27, 2016, in Kolomenskoye, there was a meeting of eighteen volhvs and priests from various neo-pagan associations: "Pagan Federation International" (PFI), SSO SRV, KJT, "Veles Circle", "Moscow Wiccan House", the Olympic Religious League "Liberation of Mind", the almanac "Saga" ("project of the Union of Free Asatru"), "Assembly of Slavic Communities Native Land". The traditions represented there including Slavic, "Hellenic", North German, and followers of "European Witchcraft". The meeting was preceded by a long preliminary discussion by a working group of the vital problems of the neo-pagan movement. A "Veche Center of Pagan Associations" was formed, and in the following months its conceptual documents were adopted. This collegial body consists of 24 neo-pagan figures. It is proposed "to create a Commonwealth of associations (followers of the Natural Faith) in Russia, Belarus and other countries, united by a common historical and cultural space."

== Literature ==
Научная

- Гайдуков А. В. (2000). Российский государственный педагогический университет имени А. И. Герцена (ed.). Идеология и практика славянского неоязычества. СПб. pp. /165.
- Gaidukov A. V. (2016). Новое язычество, неоязычество, родноверие : проблема терминологии [New paganism, neo-paganism, Rodnovery: the problem of terminology]. In R. V. Shizhensky (ed.). Язычество в современной России : опыт междисциплинарного исследования [Paganism in modern Russia: an experience of interdisciplinary research]. Nizhny Novgorod: Minin University, Volga Region Printing House. pp. 24–46.
- Кутарев О. В. (2014). "Неоязычество Европы". Пантеон (12) (Философия и культура ed.): 1801–1810. Archived from the original on 2021-10-03.
- Polinichenko D. Yu. (2012). Неоязычество и любительская лингвистика в современной России [Neopaganism and amateur linguistics in modern Russia] (PDF). Center for Research in Linguoculturology and Translation Studies (12).
- Попов И. Н. (к. ф. н.) (2016а). "Гл. 4.5. Славянская народная религия (родноверие)". Справочник всех религиозных течений и объединений в России. Archived from the original on 2022-04-07.
- Prokofiev A. V.; Filatov S. B.; Koskello A. S. (2006). "Славянское и скандинавское язычества. Викканство". In M. Burdo; S. B. Filatov (eds.). Современная религиозная жизнь России. Опыт систематического описания. Vol. 4 (2000 экз ed.). М.: Logos. pp. 155–207. ISBN 5-98704-057-4.
- Шиженский Р. В. (2007). "Волхвы в современных родноверческих общинах". Исторические судьбы русского язычества. Н. Новгород: Министерство образования и науки РФ. Нижегородский государственный педагогический университет имени Козьмы Минина.
- Шиженский Р. В. (2008). "Жречество в современном российском язычестве" (Вестник Удмуртского университета. Серия «История и филология» ed.). pp. 139–148.
- Шнирельман В. А. (2012). Русское родноверие : неоязычество и национализм в современной России. М.: Библейско-богословский институт святого апостола Андрея. ISBN 978-5-89647-291-9.
- Шнирельман В. А. (2015). Арийский миф в современном мире. Библиотека журнала «Неприкосновенный запас». М.: Новое литературное обозрение. ISBN 9785444804223.
- Янг Г. (2018). "Конструирование неоязыческой танатологии на примере "Славянской книги мёртвых" волхва Велеслава". Colloquium Heptaplomeres (научный альманах). V (5) (Colloquium heptaplomeres ed.): 59–72. ISSN 2312-1696.

Аффилированная

- Veleslav (2002). Тризна по Борису Александровичу Рыбакову. М.: Институт общегуманитарных исследований.
- Veleslav (2009). Книга Родной Веры. Основы Родового Ведания Русов и Славян. Vol. 1–2. М.: Велигор. ISBN 978-5-91742-012-7.
- Д. А. Гаврилов, Г. Э. Адамович, ed. (2013). "Соглашение «О жрецах славянских» от 23 мая 2012 года". Вестник традиционной культуры славян : сборник. Минск. pp. 114–116. Archived from the original on 2015-06-16.

== Links ==
- Шиженский Р. В. (2021). "Неоязычество и средний класс". Лекторий «Крапивенский 4». 03.02.2021.
- Велесов круг. Славянский Информационный Портал (slawa.su).
- Белояр, Богумил, Иггельд (2013). "Информационное письмо "Совета Трёх" славянских языческих объединений в связи с видеовыступлением лидера РО СРВ (РПВ) В. Куровского". Велесов круг. 11.12.2013.
- "Слово о Вечевом центре и Содружестве языческих объединений (27.08.2016, Коломенское, г. Москва)". Союз Славянских Общин Славянской Родной Веры. 31.08.2016. 2016.
- "Информационная группа Вечевого центра (ИВЦ)". vk.com. 2021.
