= Yuri Petukhov =

Yuri Petukhov may refer to:

- Yuri Petukhov (writer) (1951-2009), Russian sci-fi writer, philosopher, and publisher
- Yuri Petukhov (footballer) (born 1960), Belarusian football manager and former goalkeeper
