= Petukhov =

Petukhov, feminine: Petukhova is a Russian-language surname. It may refer to:

- Aleksandr Petukhov (Russian footballer, born 1980) (born 1980), Russian professional football player
- Aleksandr Petukhov (Kazakhstani footballer) (born 1985), Kazakh professional footballer
- Alexei Petukhov (born 1983), Russian cross country skier who has competed since 2002
- Denis Petukhov (born 1978), Russian-American ice dancer
- Ekaterina Petukhova, Russian female diver
- Melissa Petukhova
- Natalya Petukhova, Russian politician, M.P.
- Sergei Petukhov (choreographer), Russian choreographer mostly working with figure skaters, including Ilia Tkachenko
- Sergey Petukhov (sprinter) Russian athlete
- Sergey Petukhov (engineer)(1842—1912), Russian engineer
- Stanislav Petukhov (Russian politician)
- Yuri Aleksandrovich Petukhov (born 1960), Belarusian professional football coach and a former player
- Yuri Dmitrievich Petukhov (1951–2009), Russian writer and pseudo-scientist
