= Veleslav =

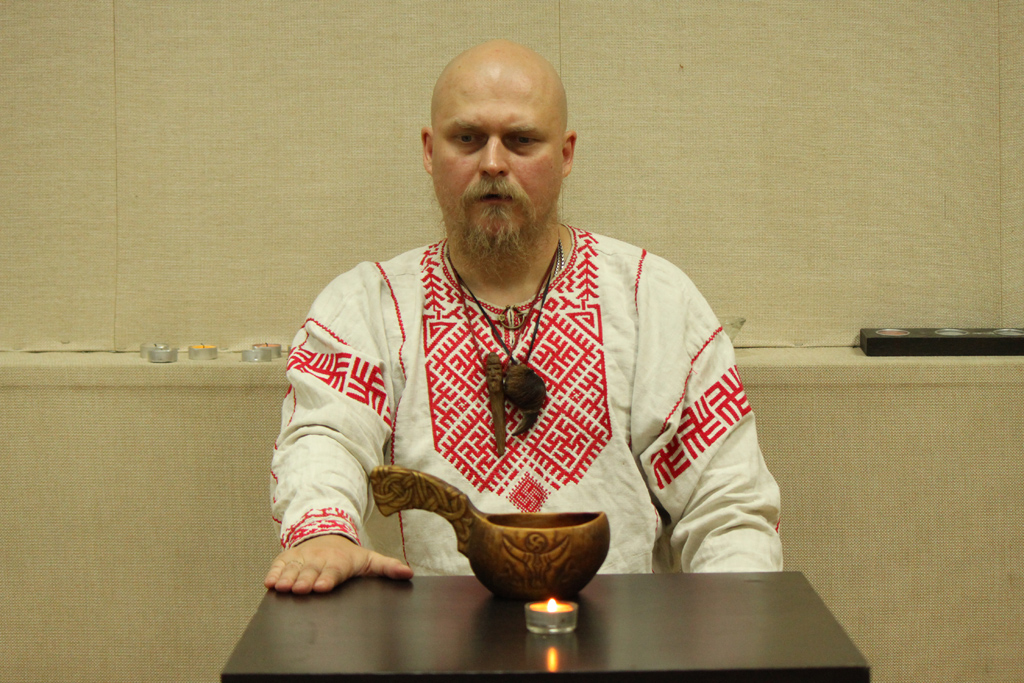
- Veleslav in Novosibirsk, 2013
- Born: Ilya Cherkasov; 8 October 1973 (age 52); Moscow, Russia
- Education: Moscow State University
- Occupation(s): Volhv, author, artist, poet, teacher, lecturer
- Years active: 1996–present
- Spouse: Lada Cherkasova (Лада Черкасова) 1998-2017, Vitoslava Cherkasova (Витослава Черкасова) 2017-present

Volhv Veleslav (Cyrillic: Волхв Велеслав) (born Ilya Cherkasov (Cyrillic: Илья Черкасов), October 8, 1973), also known as Влх. Велеслав (Vlh. Veleslav) and V.L.S.L.V., is a Russian Rodnover priest. He is also an author, artist, poet, teacher and lecturer. Veleslav is the founder of Rodolubie (Rodoljub) and the Veles circle. His early works form the basis of the Slavic neopaganism movement and its reconstruction. Veleslav is the author of several books on Russian and Slavic traditions, including The Doctrine/Teachings of the Magi: The White Book (2007, 2nd ed. 2010); The Black Book of Mara (2008); Living Vedas of Russ: Revelations of Native Gods (2008); the Book of Veles's Tales (2005), and "The Book of the Great Nav" (2011), amongst many others. He has also contributed to the first magazine for Rodnovers, "Родноверие".

== Early life ==
Since childhood, Veleslav has been fond of history, and while still a child he enthusiastically read Russian folk tales and epics. He attended the "School of the young historian" at Moscow State University. Upon leaving for the summer holidays to visit the village of Semenovskoe, near Tver, he listened with great enthusiasm to stories of old "former life" and gathered together local folklore, including songs, stories, plots, bylichki and legends. Seeking an answer to the question about the meaning of life soon led Veleslav to an independent spiritual quest.

In 1990, Veleslav graduated from high school, but instead of going to the MSU faculty of history and philosophy as his family and friends expected, he announced that he was not interested in a career as a scientist, historian or philosopher, claiming that they "speak of truth, without knowing her". After sewing together a Russian burlap shirt, he stopped eating meat, cut his hair, and began practicing yoga as well as other spiritual disciplines. At that time in Russia there were many different sects, cults and spiritual teachings, and the ROC began to gain momentum. Veleslav communicated with the followers of these groups and was interested in the essence of their teachings, but he did not join any of them, considering that truth is "realised in the heart, and not by following any doctrine, church dogma, or the partial view of a religious leader."

== Author ==
In 1992, Veleslav wrote his first book, "Samizdat", "The Doctrine of the Heart." Soon Veleslav gathered around him a small group of like-minded people who were united by a spiritual quest.

On February 24, 1998, together with like-minded people, Veleslav announced the creation of the Russian-Slavic Rodnover Community, "Rodoljub", and a spiritual and educational society, "Satya Veda" (Sanskrit, "True Knowledge"), which during the first year operated as a single unit.

According to Veleslav,

this date (February 24, 1998) marked the official date of his community. This was followed by a period of relatively short duration (one year), but which was nevertheless very significant in its results. It was at this time that the foundation was laid for the future community: developing and maintaining a ritual practice; and a worldview was formed... May 12, 1998, was the date of the first public ceremony for the reconstructed houses in the near Teply Stan. The ritual began with the worship of Veles, the Slavic God of Wisdom, Spiritual Patron of the community, and was aimed at the reunification of the participating forces with Native Gods. One year the community's pagan temple was desecrated by Christians: a ritual statue of Veles was thrown into the running water of a nearby stream; a stone Alatyrny svorochen was thrown from a mountain, and the remaining logs were cut with "Orthodox" crosses. This caused the community to equip a new temple in the more distant location where it still stands today.

In 1999, Veleslav, together with a group of Commonwealth Communities, created the "Veles' Circle", which still exists today. The stated objectives of the Veles circle are:

1. Restoration, conservation and enhancement of the spiritual heritage of their ancestors.
2. Practical development and implementation of the Volkhvs' Knowledge (Vedaniya).
3. Research and spiritual outreach.

== Appearances ==
He is featured performing a speech on Noch Velesova, a 2009 DVD by the band Arkona. Veleslav's artwork is featured in the 2012 book Родные Боги в творчестве славянских художников by Dr. Pavel Tulaev.

In the book "Gap" by Askr Svarte, he devotes to Veleslav gratitude for teachings on the Path.

== Written works ==
Under the name Veleslav

- «Доктрина Сердца» (1992) - The Doctrine of the Heart
- «Зов Гипербореи» (1998) - Call of Hyperborea
- «Се Русь — Сурья» (1998) - Behold Russia - Surya
- «Традиция» (1999) - Tradition
- «Родолюбие» (1999) - Rodoljub
- «Противостояние», изд. под псевдонимом Евпатий Коловрат (1999); - Confrontation, ed. pseudonymous Yevpaty Kolovrat
- «Средь лесов Славянских» (1999) - Among the Slavonic Forests
- «Роса на мече» (1999) - Dew on the Sword
- «Книга Травы. Стезя» (1999) - The Book of Herbs. Pathway
- «Коло славим!» (1999) - Glorify Kolo!
- «Песни Светославия» (2000) - Songs of Svetoslav
- «Пить из Реки Жизни. Книга Родосвета» (2000) - Drinking from the River of Life. Book of Radosvet
- «Книга Пустоты» (2000) - The Book of the Void
- «Искон Веры-Веды. Книга Родосвета. Книга Святогора» (2001) - Ancestral Faith-Veda. Book of Rodosvet and Svyatogor.
- «Родные Боги» (2001) - Native Gods
- «Родноверческий Искон» (2002) - Patron of Rodnoverye
- «В защиту Древней Веры...» (2002) - In Defense of the Ancient Faith
- «Тризна по Б.А. Рыбакову» (2002) - Trizna by B.A. Rybakov
- «Обрядник» (2003) - Book of Rites
- «Велес» (2003) - Veles
- «Перун» (2004) - Perun
- «Ярило» (2004) - Yarylo
- «Мара» (2004) - Mara
- «Книга Велесовых Сказов. Русские Веды: Голубиная Книга» (2005, 2 nd ed. 2009) - The Book of Veles's Tales. Russian Vedas Book of Doves
- «Вещий Словник» (2005) - Prophetic Dictionary (Вещий Словник: Славления Родных Богов, 2007)
- «Русское Родноверие. Родные Боги, Мудрословие, Обряды», совместно со Ставром (2005) - Russian Rodnoverie. Native Gods, words of wisdom, Rites, together with Stavro
- «Малый Велесов Сонник. Короб Снов», совместно с влх. Богумилом (2005) - Veles' Pocket Dream Journal. Box of Dreams, with Vlh. Bogumil
- «"Велесова Книга": Боги и Предки», совместно с влх. Богумилом (2006) - The Book of Veles: Gods and Ancestors, with Vlh. Bogumil
- «Книга Мудрости Вещего» (2006) - Prophetic Wisdom
- «Шуйный путь: Книга Нави» (2006) - Шуйный путь: Book of Nav' [NOTE: 'Шуйный путь' remains untranslated to distinguish it from the Shuyngj Way within Odinism]
- «Родовой Искон» (2006) - Patron of Rod
- «Веда Заговоров: (Славянский Заговорник)» (2007) - Veda of Protection: Slavic Guardian
- «Славянская Книга Мёртвых» (2007) - Slavonic Book of the Dead
- «Веда Нави: Чёрный Заговорник» (2007, 2 nd ed. 2010) - Veda of Nav': Black Guardian
- «Книга волховских толкований», совместно с влх. Богумилом (2007) - The Book of Volkhv Interpretations, with Vlh. Bogumil
- «Учение волхвов: Велесова Мудрость в Кощный век» (2007) - The Doctrine of the Magi: The Wisdom of Veles in the Age of Decadence
- «Учение волхвов: Белая Книга» (2007, 2 nd ed. 2010) - The Teachings of the Magi: The White Book
- «Живые Веды Руси: Откровения Родных Богов» (2008) - Living Vedas of Rus': Revelations of Native Gods
- «Чёрная Книга Мары» (2008) - The Black Book of Mara
- «Книга Велесовых Радений. Духовные практики и обряды Русско-Славянского Родноверия» (2008) И др. - The Book of Veles Rites. Spiritual Practices and Rituals of Russian-Slavic Rodnoverie
- «Заметки о самопознании. Шуйный путь» (Notes on Self-Reflection), 2009 [NOTE: 'Шуйный путь' remains untranslated to distinguish it from the Shuyngj Way within Odinism].
- «Книга Родной Веры», в 2-х тт. (2009) - First Book of Faith, in 2 vols.
- «Родные Боги Руси» (2009) - Native Gods of Russia
- «Книга Велесовых радений» (2009) - Book of Veles Rites
- «Основы родноверия. Обрядник. Кологод» (2010) - Fundamentals of Rodnoverie. Book of Rituals. Calendar.
- «Духовное Самопознание» (2010) - Spiritual Self-Reflection
- «Шуйный путь: чёрная книга нави» (2011) - Шуйный путь: The Black Book of the Navi [NOTE: 'Шуйный путь' remains untranslated to distinguish it from the Shuyngj Way within Odinism].
- «Книга Великой Нави: Хаософия и Русское Навославие» (2011) - The Book of the Great Navi: Хаософия (The Wisdom of Chaos [Discordianism]) and Russian Навославие (Praising of the Navi)
- «Учение Великого Совершенства: Откровение Горного Алтая» (2012) - Teachings of the Great Sublime: Revelation of the Altai Mountains
- «Тропами Безумия (Сборник рассказов об Ином)» (Paths of Madness (The Collected Stories of the Other)), 2012
- «Солнце Героев (Северный дневник)» (2013) - Sun of Heroes (Northern Diary)
- Etc. (И др)
- "Славянская Книга Мёртвых" (2015), 766p - About the life and death in view of the modern Slavic Rodnoverie, but also contains a wealth of historical and ethnographic material related to funeral rites and the worship of ancestors of the Slavs.

Under the name Satyavan

Veleslav has written several books on Advaita Saiva Dharma (the teachings of non-dual Shaivism) and Tantra under the pseudonym Satyavan (from Sanskrit "Satya" - "The Truth"). From the publishing house Сатья-Веда (Satya-Veda):

- "Кали-видья" (Kali-vidya) - 2003
- "Пурна-Адвайта" (Purna Advaita) - 2003. The book contains treatises of Satyavan revealing the basis of Advaita Shaivism (non-dual Shaivism). World of all living things!
- "Шива-видья" (Shiva Vidya) - 2003

From Moscow Institute of Humanities Studies:

- "Калагни-тантра" (Kalagni Tantra) - 2007. Your attention is directed to Tantric treatises of Satyavan and Saiva Dharma Advaita (nondual Shaivism), revealing one of the important parties, Satya Sanatana Dharma (Eternal True Dharma).

== See also ==
- Slavic neopaganism

== Notes and interviews ==
- Biography
- Interview Sept 12, 2008
- Interview Sept 4, 2009
- Interview Jan 21, 2010
- Interview Jan 29, 2010
- Interview Apr 9, 2010
- Interview May 12, 2010
- Interview Mar 29, 2011, May 10, 2011, Oct 4, 2011
- Interview Oct 5, 2012
- Interview Feb 4, 2013
- Interview Jan 2013 with German magazine 'По свету' (By/In the Light/Around The World) Posted online in Russian (scans) by the interviewer on April 24, 2013. Magazine link www.po-swetu.de
- Interview May 13, 2013 - Direct link to Document
- Interview May 14, 2013 (Video) - answers to questions posed on Apr 27, 2013
- Rodnovery in Russia
- Video lectures
- The Commonwealth of Commons, "Velez CIRCLE":
- The Book of the Great Navi by Volhv Veleslav (2011)
