= Nikolai Levashov =

Russian occultist and psychic healer

- Born: Nikolai Viktorovich Levashov; February 8, 1961; Kislovodsk, Russia.
- Died: June 11, 2012 (aged 51)
- Education: National University of Kharkiv
- Occupations: Writer and public figure
- Known for: Worldviews on history and antisemitic views
- Spouse: Svetlana Levashova
- Website: www.levashov.info

Nicolai or Nikolai Levashov (Russian: Никола́й Ви́кторович Левашо́в; February 8, 1961 – June 11, 2012) was a Russian occultist and psychic healer who wrote several books on life in the universe, Slavic history, the origin of mankind on Earth and other topics. From 1991 to 2005 he was known in the United States for several causes célèbres involving his patients. One of his books is classified as antisemitic and extreme and banned in Russia. He was a leader of a public organisation "Renaissance. The Golden Age" which is considered a destructive cult by the Russian Orthodox Church.

== Biography ==
Nicolai Levashov was born in 1961 in Kislovodsk. After his graduation from the department of theoretical radiophysics, University of Kharkiv, he spent a couple of years in the Soviet Army.

Toward the end of 1980s Levashov started his public activities. According to his autobiography "The mirror of my soul", by the summer of 1988 he had begun practicing healing. Having married for a second time, to a psychic, Mzia, he assisted in her stage performances of mentalism and hypnosis. With Allan Chumak and other healers, Levashov was trying to establish a state-run Foundation of Alternative Medicine asking the Soviet Ministry of Navy for support.

At the same time Levashov propagated his ideas in the Ministry of Foreign Affairs. Scott Shane, an American journalist with The Baltimore Sun in Russia, writes that Levashov claimed he could speak with dolphins, clean polluted city air by his mental power, heal by phone, see internal organs through the skin etc. Shane met Levashov at a briefing in the Ministry concerning the Angolan Civil War, although "Nikolai Levashov modestly explained that he knew nothing about international relations". Scott Shane believes that the proliferation of pseudoscientists such as Chumak and Levashov was a negative underside of the relaxation of censorship in the Soviet Union.

External image
- Performance of Mzia and Nicolai Levashov
- Psychics in the Institute of Human Brain of the USSR Academy of Sciences, Jan 1 1990. Left to right: Mikhail Dekhta, Mzia Levashova, Valery Yusupov, and Nicolai Levashov. Photo in RIA Novosti archive.

In July 1990 Soviet Central Television broadcast a film about the Levashov couple. It was based on assertions by Mzia and Nicolai and on a trial involving four journalists. The trial was carried out in the Institute of Human Brain, a scientific organization, but controversial for its interest in extrasensory perception. Among the four people tested, M. Dekhta was a friend of Levashov, and Ruben Isahakyan was another healer who later founded an alternative medicine company, Altimed.

The story of the Levashovs was published in the magazine Television and Radio as well.

By the time of the broadcast, Nicolai and Mzia were already divorced. In 1990—1991 Levashov performed on tour in Russian cities, practicing faith healing.

=== In the United States ===
In 1991 Nicolai Levashov and his third wife Svetlana (née Serëgina or Žymantienė) visited the United States and settled in California for 15 years.

Nicolai started his healing practice in the American College of Traditional Chinese Medicine, which consisted of two employees in three rooms. He made acquaintance with an Armenian family of Soviet descent, the Orbelians. George Orbelian and his wife Marcia Paulsen-Orbelian supported Levashov, spoke about him on the local TV and translated his books from Russian into English. Levashov was also broadcast on Russian Voice Radio (San Francisco).

Levashov is mentioned in books and articles by astrologer Jeanne Avery, "distance healer" Robert Ginsburg, Reichian therapist Richard Blasband and his alternative medicine clinic Center For Functional Research, and "healer" Todd Telford. Barbara Koopman (M.D., Ph.D. in geriatrics), who studies mental healing phenomenon, says that Levashov considers understanding the anisotropy of the universe necessary for creation or dissolution of matter for healing purposes.

Scientific skeptics have written about Levashov and his healing practice. Michael Shermer published an article in Skeptic saying that B. Koopman trusted Levashov because he allegedly cured her friend, actress Susan Strasberg, who had cancer. Nonetheless, in January 1999 Strasberg died of cancer.

Another case is that of Elisabeth Targ's death. A well-known psychologist who believed in psychics, she was diagnosed with glioblastoma multiforme in her 40s; radiation therapy was prescribed. Targ consulted practitioners of alternative medicine including Levashov. As Po Bronson writes, “her bedroom turned into a circus. Healers from everywhere showed up… There was a Lakota sun dancer who burned sage; Nicolai Levashov, a Russian psychic who waved his hands; an acupuncturist with rare Chinese herbs; an energy worker who used methods of the Miwok peoples”. Levashov claimed he cured the cancer and persuaded Targ to stop radiation therapy. She became worse, but Levashov insisted it was not the cancer but some necrotic tissues. In three weeks Targ died from glioblastoma. This story was published in Wired and was used in an article by Vic Stenger for the Skeptical Briefs.

Yet another case, which drew a wide response, was that of 13-year-old Isabelle Prichard, who in 2007 also had glioblastoma multiforme. After several healing sessions (some of them conducted by phone) Levashov stated he had stopped the cancer, and persuaded Prichard's parents to reject an operation, against the advice of doctors. The Oregon Department of Human Services said that the parents had the right to refuse treatment for religious reasons and blamed by Steven Novella. There was a sustained remission which led Barbara Koopman to write articles praising the "miraculous healing", and CBS broadcast an episode in Unsolved Mysteries The decision of parents was criticized in The Skeptic's Dictionary and in a book of T. Riniolo.

=== Return to Russia ===
In 2006, Levashov returned to Russia, where he increased his public activity: he published many books and was invited on TV and radio, including REN TV, Channel One, TV-3, Russia 1 and others. One of his most common claims was that the 2010 Northern Hemisphere summer heat waves were the result of a US "Climate Change Weapon", and he said he saved Russia from that weapon. Levashov was a supporter of the HAARP conspiracy theory. He supported the authenticity of the Book of Veles, the extraterrestrial colonization of Earth, a pseudohistorical theory close to the New Chronology (although Levashov does not mention Anatoly Fomenko), and the existence of the "vanished continent" of Atlantis. Some of his statements are similar to ideas from the Slavic-Arian Vedas (a hoax book of Slavic Neopaganism). He opposed vaccination and genetically modified foods. Levashov was an atheist, and aggressively objected to Christianity, although his views were far from materialism.

Some television hosts and newspapers presented Levashov as a professional physicist or meteorologist while others criticize him and call him a "pseudoscientist".

Levashov wrote some half dozen books available in print and online; 50,000 copies have been printed. One of the books, the antisemitic "Russian History Viewed through Distorted Mirrors", was prohibited from being published or distributed in Russia by the Court of Kaluga Region due to its extremism.

Well-known Russian illusionist Yuri Gorny (a former psychic) says Levashov picks only the most suggestible people from the audience for his psychic tricks.

In May 2007 Levashov founded a public organization "Renaissance. The Golden Age" (Russian: Возрождение. Золотой век) which is considered a destructive cult by the Russian Orthodox Church. The organization has headquarters in Moscow, 18 branches in Russia, and four branches abroad, in Kyiv, Chişinău, Minsk, and Kharkiv. It is not registered with the Ministry of Justice.

The members of "Renaissance. The Golden Age" disseminate Levashov's statements. They organize rallies supporting Levashov and opposing genetically modified foods and vaccination in many Russian cities, advertise Levashov's books on the Internet and in the press. They conduct seminars in schools and universities popularizing ideas of Levashov and other pseudoscientific theories such as telegony. In Petropavlovsk-Kamchatsky they converted a schoolteacher, O. Shepetovskaya, to their organization; Levashov's ideas were then taught at her school #45.

== Bibliography ==
- Россия в кривых зеркалах (Russian History Viewed through Distorted Mirrors), 2007 (banned in Russia for antisemitism)
- Последнее обращение к человечеству… (The Final Appeal to Mankind), М.: Русский терем, 1997. — 336 pages. ISBN 978-5-4264-0012-2. 9000 printed copies.
- Неоднородная Вселенная (The Anisotropic Universe), Архангельск: Правда севера, 2006, — 396 pages. ISBN 5-85879-226-X. 5000 printed copies.
- Возможности Разума. Сборник статей (Spirit and Mind; Abilities of Mind), Архангельск: Правда Севера, 2006, — 278 pages. ISBN 5-85879-278-2. 2000 printed copies.
  - 2nd edition, М.: Издатель И. В. Балабанов, 2008, — 208 pages. ISBN 978-5-91563-008-5. 5000 printed copies.
  - 3rd edition, СПб: Издательство Митраков, 2011, — 304 pages. ISBN 978-5-426-40007-8. 5000 printed copies.
- Зеркало моей души, т.1 (The mirror of my soul, vol. 1), СПб: Издательство Митраков, 2010, — 528 pages. ISBN 978-5-426-40001-6. 5000 printed copies.
- Зеркало моей души, т.2 (The mirror of my soul, vol. 2), СПб: Издательство Митраков, 2011, — 544 pages. ISBN 978-5-426-40008-5. 5000 printed copies.
- Сказ о Ясном Соколе. Прошлое и настоящее, СПб: Издательство Митраков, 2011 — 192 pages. ISBN 978-5-426-40002-3. 7000 printed copies.

One book by Levashov's wife Svetlana Levashova was published:

- Откровение (Revelation), СПб: Издательство Митраков, 2011. (in two volumes). 7000 printed copies.
