= Alexander Asov =

Russian author

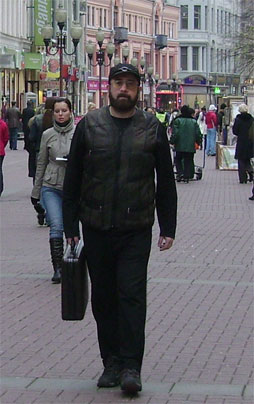
- Born: Alexander Igorevich Asov; June 29, 1964 (age 61)
- Other names: Bus Kresen
- Occupation: Writer

Alexander Igorevich Asov (Russian: Александр Игоревич Асов, IPA: [ɐlʲɪˈksandr ɪˈɡorʲɪvʲɪtɕ ˈasəf]; born 29 June 1964), alias Bus Kresen (Бус Кресень, IPA: [bus krʲesʲenʲ]), is an author of books in Russian pseudohistory (called "фолк-хистори" ("folk-history") in Russian publications), as well as novels and poems. He is best known as translator and commenter of allegedly ancient Slavic texts, including Book of Veles, widely recognized as forgeries.

In 2012, a forum of several rodnoveriye (Russian neopaganism) movements published a declaration, which described studies of A. Asov (along with some others) as detrimental to Russian neopaganism.
