= Yuri Petukhov (footballer) =

Belarusian footballer and coach

Personal information
- Full name: Yuri Aleksandrovich Petukhov
- Date of birth: 19 February 1960 (age 66)
- Place of birth: Minsk, Belarusian SSR
- Height: 1.81 m (5 ft 11 1/2 in)
- Position: Goalkeeper

Team information
- Current team: FC Solyaris Moscow (GK coach)

Senior career*
Years	Team	Apps	(Gls)
1980–1982	Spartak Semipalatinsk	38	(0)
1983	Metalist Kharkiv	1	(0)
1983–1985	Mayak Kharkiv	41	(0)
1985	Metalist Kharkiv	2	(0)
1986–1989	Dnepr Mogilev	97	(0)
1990	Sogdiana Jizak	39	(0)
1991–1993	Lokomotíva Košice		

Managerial career
- 1997–2004: BATE Borisov (GK coach)
- 2005–2006: Darida Minsk Raion (asst)
- 2006: Moscow (reserves asst)
- 2006–2007: Belarus (GK coach)
- 2007–2008: Moscow (reserves GK coach)
- 2010: Khimki (GK coach)
- 2011: Lokomotiv Moscow (GK coach)
- 2012–2015: Khimki (GK coach)
- 2016–: FC Solyaris Moscow (GK coach)
- * Club domestic league appearances and goals

Yuri Aleksandrovich Petukhov (Russian: Юрий Александрович Петухов; born 19 February 1960 in Minsk) is a Belarusian professional football coach and a former player currently working as goalkeepers coach with FC Solyaris Moscow.
