= Union of Slavic Communities of the Slavic Native Faith =

Total population
- ~3000

Founder
- Vadim Kazakov

Regions with significant populations
- Russia, Ukraine, Belarus

Religions
- Slavic Native Faith

Languages
- Russian

Website
- https://rodnovery.ru/

The Union of Slavic Communities of the Slavic Native Faith (acronym: USC SNF; Russian: Союз Славянских Общин Славянской Родной Веры, Russian acronym: ССО СРВ) is one of the largest Russian organisations of Slavic Native Faith (Rodnovery) groups, established in 1997, and officially recognised by the government in 2014 (becoming the first Rodnover organisation to be recognised by the Russian government).

== History ==
In September 1993, in Kaluga, Vadim Kazakov, a student of Alexey Dobrovolsky (Dobroslav) (one of the founders of the Russian Rodnoverie), created the Kaluga Slavic Community. In addition to the Kaluga branch, the "Moscow Slavic Pagan Community" had branches in Kaliningrad, Vladimir, Izhevsk, and Ryazan. Until the end of 1998, the Obninsk Vedic Community "Troyana", established in November 1993, was headed by the volkhv Bogumil (D. A. Gasanov) and closely cooperated with the Kaluga Community.

The Union of Slavic Native Belief Communities was established in 1997 by initiative of three constituent communities from Moscow, Kaluga and Obninsk. On 19 July 1997 Vadim Stanislavovich Kazakov from Kaluga's community was elected as the leader of the USC SNB. In July 1999, Alexey Dobrovolsky was elected Supreme Volkhv. On 21 July 2011 Kazakov resigned and Maksim Ionov became his successor through a vote held by the veche (assembly) on 23 July.

Annually, on Perun's Day (20 July) the "All-Slavic Veche" takes place in Kaluga. The assembly deals with issues including the further widening of the organisation, the cooperation with other organisations, and also the nominations of the chief and of the high priesthood. Hundreds of representatives of many Slavic communities scattered throughout Russia come to the yearly veche.

In April 2011, the USC SNB bought a 4,77-hectares plot of land just five kilometres away from the city of Kaluga, on the left bank of the river Kaluzhka, located in the village of Krasotinka, with the purpose of building a temple.

In 2014, the USC SNB was officially registered by the government of Russia as an interregional organisation for the development of Slavic culture.

On 22 June 2015, the day of summer solstice, the Temple of the Fire of Svarozich (Храм Огня Сварожича) was officially opened in the village of Krasotinka.

== Ideology ==
The union claims to represent Slavic Native Faith (Rodnovery), that is to say the revival of historical Slavic religion, upon which indigenous Slavic customs and traditions rely. The organisation aims at the consolidation of Slavic Native Faith communities across the different Slavic states, as well as the cooperation with non-Slavic modern Pagan organisations in Europe, the United States and Canada.

The USC SNF requires believers in Slavic Native Faith to be genealogically Slavs.

== Constituent groups ==
- Moscow Slavic Community "Svetoyariye"
- Moscow Slavic Community "Circle of the Viatiches"
- Kaluga Slavic Community
- Oryol Slavic Community
- Balashov Slavic Community
- Stavropol Slavic Community "Slavic Heritage"
- Cherepovets Slavic Community "Gromnitsa"
- Novokuznetsk Slavic Community
- Anapa Slavic Community
- Ozersk Slavic Community
- Magnitogorsk Slavic Community
- Slavyansk-na-Kubani Slavic Community "Sventovid"
- Tambov Slavic Community "Zhiva"
- Smolensk Slavic Community "Morning of Svarog"
- Kemerovo Slavic Community "Goryuch Stone"

== Splinter organisations and cooperation ==
Some organisations branched out of the Union of Slavic Native Faith Communities due to ideological differences. The original Obninsk and Moscow communities left the USC SNB in 2002, on the occasion of the Bittsa Accord, establishing the Circle of Pagan Tradition (CPT).

In 2009, the USC SNB, the CPT and the Circle of Veles issued a joint statement condemning Ynglism. In 2012 the same three organisations signed an "Agreement on Mutual Recognition of Priests", which defined common criteria for the ordination of Slavic Native Faith's priesthood.

== See also ==
- Rodnover Confederation
