= Mikhail Zadornov (comedian) =

Soviet and Russian stand-up comedian and writer (1948–2017)

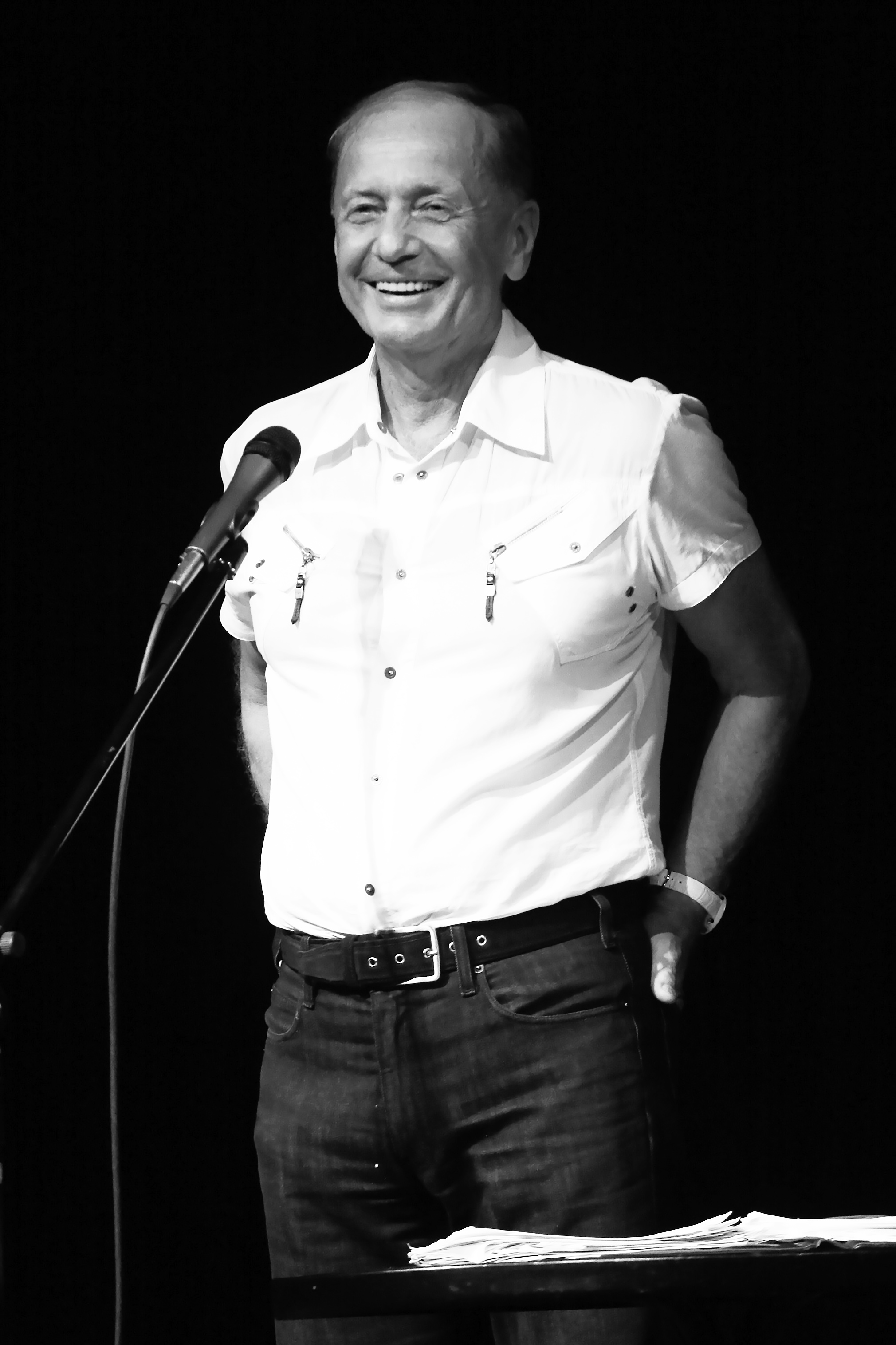
- Zadornov in 2012
- Born: Mikhail Nikolayevich Zadornov; 21 July 1948; Jūrmala, Latvian SSR, Soviet Union
- Died: 10 November 2017 (aged 69); Moscow, Russia

Comedy career
- Years active: 1974 – 2017
- Genre: Satire
- Website: zadornov.net

Mikhail Nikolayevich Zadornov (Russian: Михаи́л Никола́евич Задо́рнов, Mihaíl Nikolájevič Zadórnov; 21 July 1948 in Jūrmala, Latvian SSR, USSR – 10 November 2017 in Moscow, Russia) was a Soviet and Russian stand-up comedian and writer. Zadornov was born into an artistic family, his father Nikolay Zadornov (1909-1992) being a notable writer from Riga. Zadornov's mother, Elena Matusevich (1909-2003), came from an old noble family, which can trace its roots to the Polish king Stephen Bathory.

As a child, Zadornov listened to his father reading him works of literature before he went to sleep, such as classic writings of adventure and suspense, and poems. Zadornov's parents wanted their son to become an engineer, so he went to an engineering institute. Mikhail Zadornov graduated from Moscow Aviation Institute. However, in the early 1980s he started a career as a humorist, and later mockingly remembered his engineering days.

== Career ==
Mikhail Nikolayevich Zadornov had a long career path with different challenges. Zadornov's work was printed and first seen in 1976. In 1984 Zadornov appeared for the first time on TV. In 1984-1985 he worked as a leader of a group of satire and humor in the magazine called Humor. Stories called “An Open Letter to the General Secretary” and “The Ninth Wagon” were written by Zadornov for the show "Around the Laughter" and also in the magazine called The Art of Cinema. Those pieces spread across the USSR quickly gained him popularity. During that period, a person saying, in public, anything negative or insultive to the government, was in high risk of being arrested and jailed – surprisingly Zadornov was not. New York Times had made a conclusion that “reconstruction has really started in USSR” (“что в СССР действительно началась перестройка”). In 1998 Zadornov published four volumes of his incomplete works. Many plays were performed, written and played, based on those volumes. In parallel with writing pieces Zadornov started performing and making his own shows where he would compare life in Russia and other countries of the world, tell stories about his experience in other countries. His jokes in the end of 20th century concentrated more on satirizing USSR and its inhabitants, and later shifted to mockery and criticizing of the West. His most common stories are comparing Russians to Americans. In later concerts he praised the Soviet education system.

== Style ==
A recurring theme in Zadornov's humour is national stereotype and national mentality. He often satirically compared Russian traditions and lifestyle with that of other nations, especially Americans and former Soviet countries. Zadornov mocked westernization in both Russia and abroad. In 2002, Zadornov rescinded his visa to the United States as a protest to the American athletes' flag-waving behavior at the Salt Lake City 2002 Winter Olympics. As Mikhail sometimes targeted Russia's top power figures, some of his sketches were rejected or edited by state TV stations on political grounds.

He supported the revisionist fringe theory that the Russian language descends from the Vedas and Etruria, put forward by philosopher Valeriy Chudinov. Since 2006, Zadornov had incorporated Chudinov-style wordplay into his sketches, based on folk etymology. Zadornov ran an internet site and quoted stories and jokes found on the Internet or e-mailed to him by fans.

In March 2014 he signed a letter in support of the position of the President of Russia Vladimir Putin on accession of Crimea to Russia.

== Education ==
Zadornov attended a public school in Riga and showed a lot of interest in play acting and performing. After Zadornov graduated, he went to Riga's Institute of Civil Aviation Engineers, as his parents wanted. Later on, he transferred to Moscow Aviation Institute, where he finished his studies in engines. After graduating from the institute, he remained in a dance club that performed plays and stories to entertain people. The club gained popularity and was known across Moscow. Zadornov also formed a student theater called "Agitteatr" (Агиттеатр), and they presented plays on certain topics. They would sing songs and tell stories that described life and did not insult the government. The group traveled to most of the parts of the USSR and gained popularity. Zadornov received a prestigious Lenin Komsomol Prize and was awarded the title of National Artist, a title given to a performer who reaches substantial popularity among the people.

== Personal life ==
Zadornov was married in 1971 to Velta Kalnbērziņa (Велта Яновна Калнберзина); she is the daughter of Soviet Latvian politician Jānis Kalnbērziņš and a professor of English in the Philological Faculty of the Moscow State University. Mikhail and Velta went to the same school in Riga as children. They also studied together in the Moscow Aviation Institute. At the same time, Zadornov's popularity was growing quickly. Also, at that moment, Zadornov started dating his administrator Elena Bombina (Елена Бомбина). Zadornov divorced Velta in 2009. Mikhail and Elena had a common-law marriage, and had one daughter named Elena Zadornova (Елена Задорнова); she studied at the Russian Academy of Theater Arts and became an actress.

== Religion ==
Zadornov was baptised as a Russian Orthodox Christian in 1992. In the 2000s he converted to Rodnovery (Slavic Native Faith), and expressed his favour towards the social ideal of the Ringing Cedars' Anastasian movement, that is to say the "ancestral settlements". Shortly before his death, he converted to Orthodoxy. After his death, he was given an Orthodox Christian funeral.

== Death ==
Zadornov died of brain cancer on 10 November 2017, at 9:15 A.M.
