= Yuri Petukhov (writer) =

Russian writer (1951–2009)

Юрий Петухов
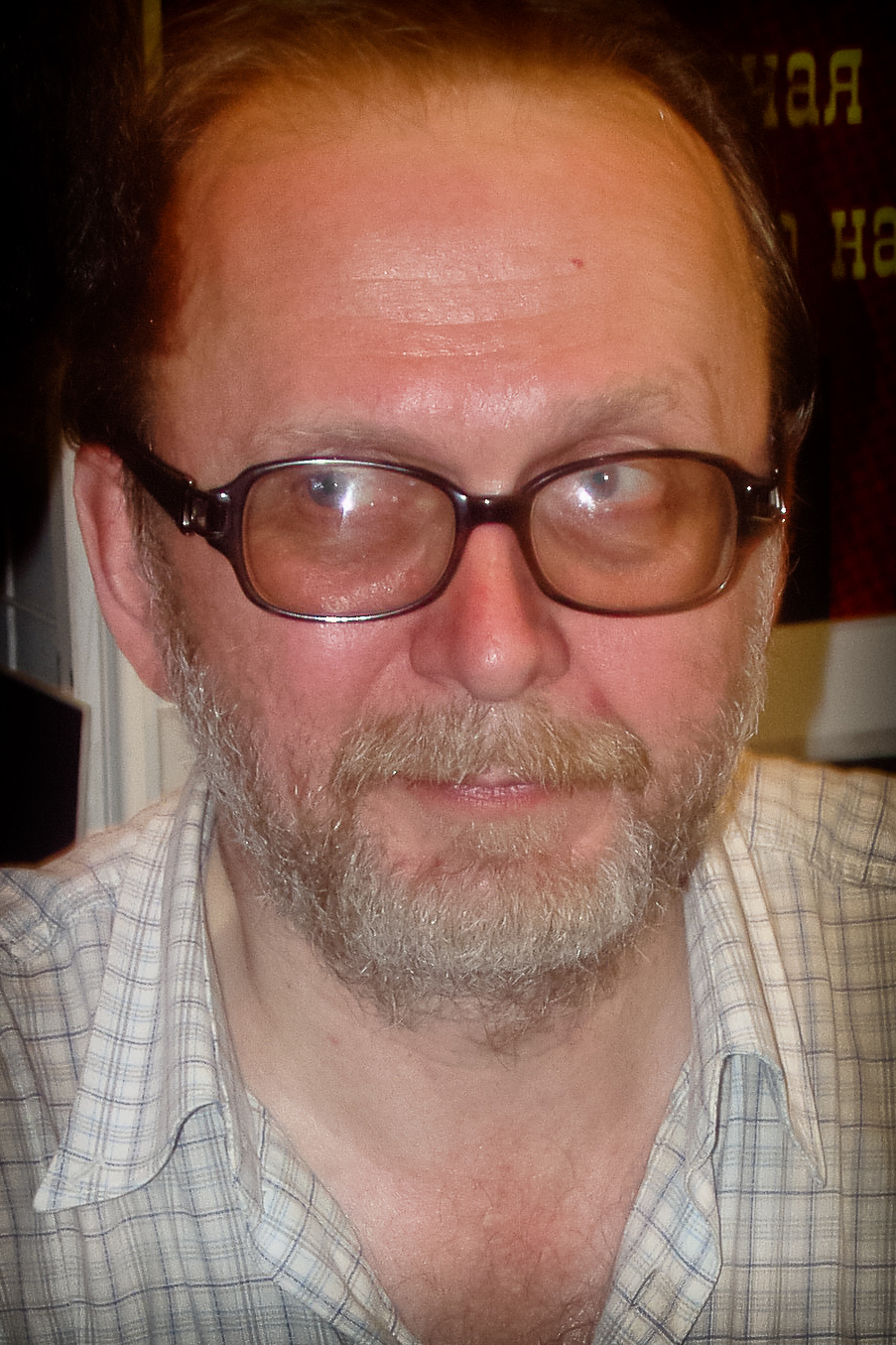
- Yu. D. Petukhov at ММКВЯ–2008
- Born: Юрий Дмитриевич Петухов; May 17, 1951; Moscow, USSR
- Died: February 1, 2009 (aged 57)
- Occupations: Prosaist, publisher
- Writing career
- Language: Russian
- Period: 1983–2009
- Genres: Sci-fi, volkshistory
- Website: juri-petuchov.ru

Yuri Dmitrievich Petukhov (Russian: Ю́рий Дми́триевич Петухо́в) (May 17, 1951 – February 1, 2009) was a Russian sci-fi writer, philosopher, publisher, non-academic explorer in world history and philology.

== Biography ==
Petukhov was born in Moscow. From 1969 to 1971, he served in the Soviet army in Hungary. From 1972 to 1985, he worked in a military-related scientific institute. In 1983 he published his first book (in the realistic genre, about life of motor-rifle troops) Two Springs from Now (Russian: «Через две весны»).

In 1990 and 1991, he published the novels Massacre (Russian: «Бойня») and Satanic Potion (Russian: «Сатанинское Зелье»), which by his own words opened a "new genre" of Russian literature—"super-new black wave" or "literature of sverkhrealism". In August 1991, he stated that World War III has happened and new world partition is going on.

In his autobiographical essay "Black House" (Russian: «Чёрный дом», 1994) he gives his evidence of the events of the autumn of 1993 in Moscow, how he was marching through Krymsky Bridge to Moscow City Hall, moved to Ostankino TV center and got there under severe shooting, and saw crowds admiring the White House shelling which was shocking for him. In his opinion, march of October 3 was Russian people's uprising against Anglo-American colonial regime, but the victory was lost due to indecision of White House defenders' leaders.

Petukhov died in February 2009 when visiting his parents' graves.

== Publishing activity ==
Most of well-known Petukhov's editions of the 1990s were published in his own publishing house "Metagalaktika". Bondarenko remembers that all his author's fee and publisher's profit he spent on publishing newspapers and magazines. Petukhov published:

- Newspaper "Voice of the Universe" (Russian: Голос Вселенной), subtitled as "Information-publicistic and literary independent newspaper: press organ of non-governmental transcendental spheres" (Russian: Информационно-публицистическая и литературно-художественная газета: Печатный орган внеправительственных трансцендентных сфер). Most materials in the newspaper were thus not subscribed. "Voice of the Universe" is ironically mentioned in humorous book "Остров Русь 2, или Принцесса Леокады" (2009) by Stanislav and Yuliy Burkin as reading of father of main characters, who was turned on everything anomal.

Russian

Вера в добрых инопланетян — это детские грезы вымирающего Человечества <…> Демоны Ада, являющиеся нам в обличии пришельцев, несут Страх, Ужас и Горе. Их сущность — Зло. Их пришествие — Сумерки Человечества и Предвестие Скорого Конца

Артур Скандлер, философ, XX век

English
Believing in kind aliens is a childish dream of extincting Humanity […] Daemons of the Hell, appearing to us in appearance of aliens, bring Horror, Fear and Grieve. Their essence is Evil. Their advent is the Twilight of Humanity and the Presage of the Soon End

Arthur Scundler, philosopher, 20th century

- Magazine "Adventures, fantastics" (Russian: Приключения, фантастика), many separate books (all this mostly written by himself). Logo of this magazine could be seen on most editions of Petukhov (pictured).

In 1990s Petukhov's editions were rather widespread and well-sold.

== Reception ==
In 1991, critic Vladimir Gopman in his article Cat at TV-set, or "Poor Men's" Fantastics (Russian: Кот перед телевизором, или Фантастика «для бедных») compared reader of Petukhov and some other writers who appeared in Soviet Union at this time with the eponymous Cat which is not very selective in art. He attested Petukhov as able promoter but bad writer, and his publicistics he connected with chauvinistic Soviet groups.

Vl. Gakov's "Encyclopedia of Fantastics" says: "Petukhov has become known mainly not for his multiple novels and stories, which have no special literature merits, but for Petukhov's pathological desire to make espatage on public with obtrusive propaganda of own 'geniality': multiple interviews with himself, advertising posters and pamphlets, declarations in press." Writers V. Bondarenko^{ru} and V. Lichutin, on other side, estimate Petukhov highly.

== Historical, political and philological views ==
Petukhov developed a theory of pseudohistory (Russian: фолк-хистори) and pseudophilology, which stated that all real people are come from Ruses and all languages are developed from Russian. His best known work on this topic is the 3-volumed History of Ruses (Russian: История русов). The whole series of books about what he called "true history" (Russian: Подлинная история) was published by his own publishing house Metagalaktika. Petukhov stated that all best-known historical science is nothing but result of geopolitical ambitions and "town fantasies" of Romano-German historists.

As an example of his views, he said that the Mongol conquest was nothing but a great myth created by Catholic priests; the Mongolian Horde were Cossacks returning from the east, and Batu Khan was, in fact, Alexandr Nevsky. Petukhov stated that Europe and America were created by Russians and should be repossessed. All Soviet and Russian leaders, except Stalin, were according to him traitors and degenerates. In New World Order (Russian: Новый мировой порядок), he accused America of starting World War III by exploding Chernobyl and predicted a Russian victory in the final battle.

Petukhov turned to the etymology proposed by Max Müller, who derived the term "Aryans" from the Slavic "orati", meaning "to plow". Petukhov ignored later evidence of the fallacy of this etymology. At the same time, under the influence of the ideas of one of the founders of Russian neo-paganism, Alexey Dobrovolsky (Dobroslav), who did not have a higher education, Petukhov derived the root "ar" from "yar", "yary".

== Petukhov and religion ==
Yuri Petukhov declared himself to be Orthodoxal Christian, but in his books there are many neo-pagan and ufological motives. For example, he said that Jesus Christ was born in family of Ruses to whom Jerusalem used to belong. Brochure "Devil and his present lying miracles and lying prophets" (ca. 1993), published by Danilov monastery under blessing of Alexy II, editions of Petukhov (newspaper Voice of the Universe, libraries of Galaktika and Metagalaktika, book Prediction etc.) are described as containing blasphemy and falsifications, inacceptable and leading believers who will read them into hell.

== Encyclopedia of Beings from Space ==
The Encyclopedia of Beings from Space (Russian: Энциклопедия космических существ) included dozens of pictures of different monsters, which appeared in newspaper Voice of the Universe in 1991; each picture was accompanied by text displaying characteristics of the monster.

== Star Revenge ==
The pentalogy Star Revenge (Russian: «Звёздная месть», 1990–1995) is the best known of Petukhov's works. It is set primarily in the 25th to 33rd centuries. This book, as example of "patriotic" fiction, contains much of politic suggestions.

=== Plot ===
1. Angel of Revenge («Ангел Возмездия», «Система», 1990)
  Cover of first edition
  Main character, space desanter Ivan, suddenly remembers how his parents were killed by non-humanoids, and he as baby was left in rescue boat into open space. Ivan wants revenge and finds way to that place, but can do nothing to superpowered aliens; escaping in last moment, he knows that invasion on the Earth is prepared.
2. Rebel of Ghouls («Бунт вурдалаков», «Пристанище», 1993)
  Being back, Ivan tries to warn government, but he is not listened at. Some time after he is sent to some planet to rescue earthlings-hostages. It appeared that people of the 33rd century made there a polygon beyond time and space; they created monsters—leshys, undeads etc. They didn't know that there were really such beings. Monsters from hell got to the polygon, killed half of people and turned others into living source of biomass. The polygon was closed, turned into Refuge (Russian: Пристанище) and sent into past—to 25th century. Monsters wanted to get to the Earth, where they already have supporters – as members of government, who have sent Ivan to death. Ivan succeeded to get out from Refuge; now he knew that the invasion can happen any moment from two directions – from System or from Refuge.
3. Immersion into Darkness («Погружение во мрак», «Каторга», 1994)
  Ivan decided to fight on his own and gathers a crew. Ivan goes to underwater servitude on planet Girgea to rescue his friend—former space desanter and chief of a band Goog Hlodrick the Wild. He and his friends meet different strange races–"before-exploders" (bodyless supercivilizations of universe which was before Big Bang), troggs etc. It appears that Earth is already governed by banditic syndicates and satanic sects, some of which has relations to invaders.
4. Invasion from Hell («Вторжение из ада», «Вторжение», 1995)
  Ivan and his friends are up to overthrow malicious government of Earth. Alpha-corpus of space desant takes their side, great war shocks all the world, Antarctic continent is beaten through to destroy shelter of rich rascals. They take power over Great Russia and whole world, but too late—traitors have called back all the outer armed forces for renovation to open road for invaders. But main struck is from underearth—hordes of satanoids and diabloids (mutated members of satanic sects controlled by aliens) creep out, destroy everything and kill everybody. Ivan accuses himself that humanity is destroyed from his wrongs, and in Khram in Moscow (associated with Cathedral of Christ the Saviour, it's the only place which is protected from invaders by supernatural force) he commits suicide.
5. Sword of Pantocrator («Меч Вседержителя», «Армагеддон», 1995)
  All people of Earth are arisen from death by "infernofields" for endless torture and serving as blood and flesh fabrics for monsters. Last centers of resistance in space can do nothing but continue their hopeless struggle. Ivan goes to hell but is taken from there by a light ray. He sees Archangel Michael and then God (in image of grey-eyed fair-haired men, which is prototypic appearance of Petukhov's Ruses). God tells him that a "chain of worlds" has been before – each world was created good with some beings having soul (in Ivan's world, they were Ruses) and some not, but afterwards by freedom of will evil appeared and by cunning way took the upper hand so that the world turned into hell-like place; after that world was destroyed by "Big Bang", but some evil forces can stay alive and get into future and another worlds. He says that Ivan has no guilt except suicide, and as the last Rus Ivan is sent to be "Pantocrator's sword". Ivan is arisen from death in Khram and joins to his friends for a while. Then he goes into Axial dimension (a road connecting worlds and places where one must struggle with phantoms of his memory) and finds road into Old World – place out of time which bourned everything else, "New worlds". Mag lived 3000 years before tells him (Petukhov's version of) world history: how Proto-Ruses came from Hyperborea and learned soulless protanthrops to be humans, and how then among them God's space rays introduced to be born Ruses – people who created all the civilization but by traitors and false historians came into forgottenness and decay. Ivan gets power of all Ruses ever lived. Additionally, mag learns him how to travel by time. The learning in Old World happens beyond time but Ivan must see all his friends dying. Afterwards, he comes out, and with his power destroys parasites from all Earth's history, so that the invasion have never happened.

=== Influence ===
The author's Encyclopedia of Star Revenge wasn't finished or published. The 1993 song Звёздная месть by group Железный поток was loosely based on themes from the novel. The 2010 amateur film "Зоряна помста" (Ukrainian for "Star Revenge") by study "УПВ Арт Груп" (Kyiv) has minor connections with Petukhov's plot, it mostly parodies Western sci-fi action films (including Star Wars, Dune and Tremors).

== Judicial prohibitions of Petukhov's works ==
On July 20, 2006, a Prosecutor's Office of Central District of Volgograd initiated a comprehensive examination of Petukhov's works by group of psychologists, politologists and linguists. They concluded that the texts promotes the ideas of racial, national and religiuous animosity,cult of force and violence, xenophobia. В прокуратуру Москвы были направлены материалы на предмет наличия состава преступления.

February 5, 2007 Perovsky court of Moscow made a precedent of prohibition of artistic books. Law "About defence to extremistic activity" (Russian: «О противодействии экстремистской деятельности») was applied to Petukhov's books. Books "World War IV" («Четвертая Мировая») and "Genocide" («Геноцид») confirmed to be extremistic, prohibited and due to be taken out and be destroyed.

Petukhov filed a cassation to a higher instance.
