= List of Guggenheim Museums =

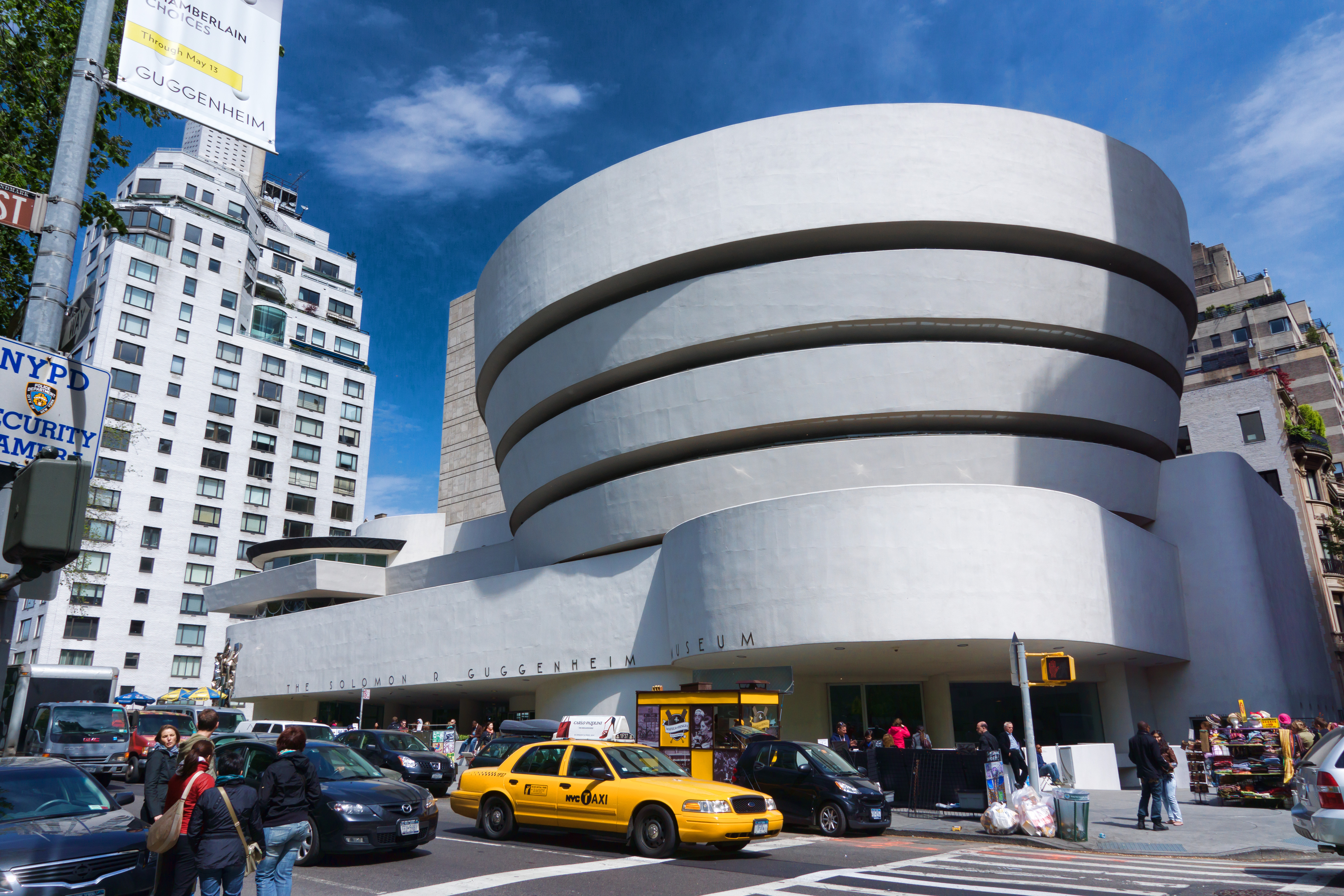
The Solomon R. Guggenheim Museum in New York City was the first Guggenheim Museum established.

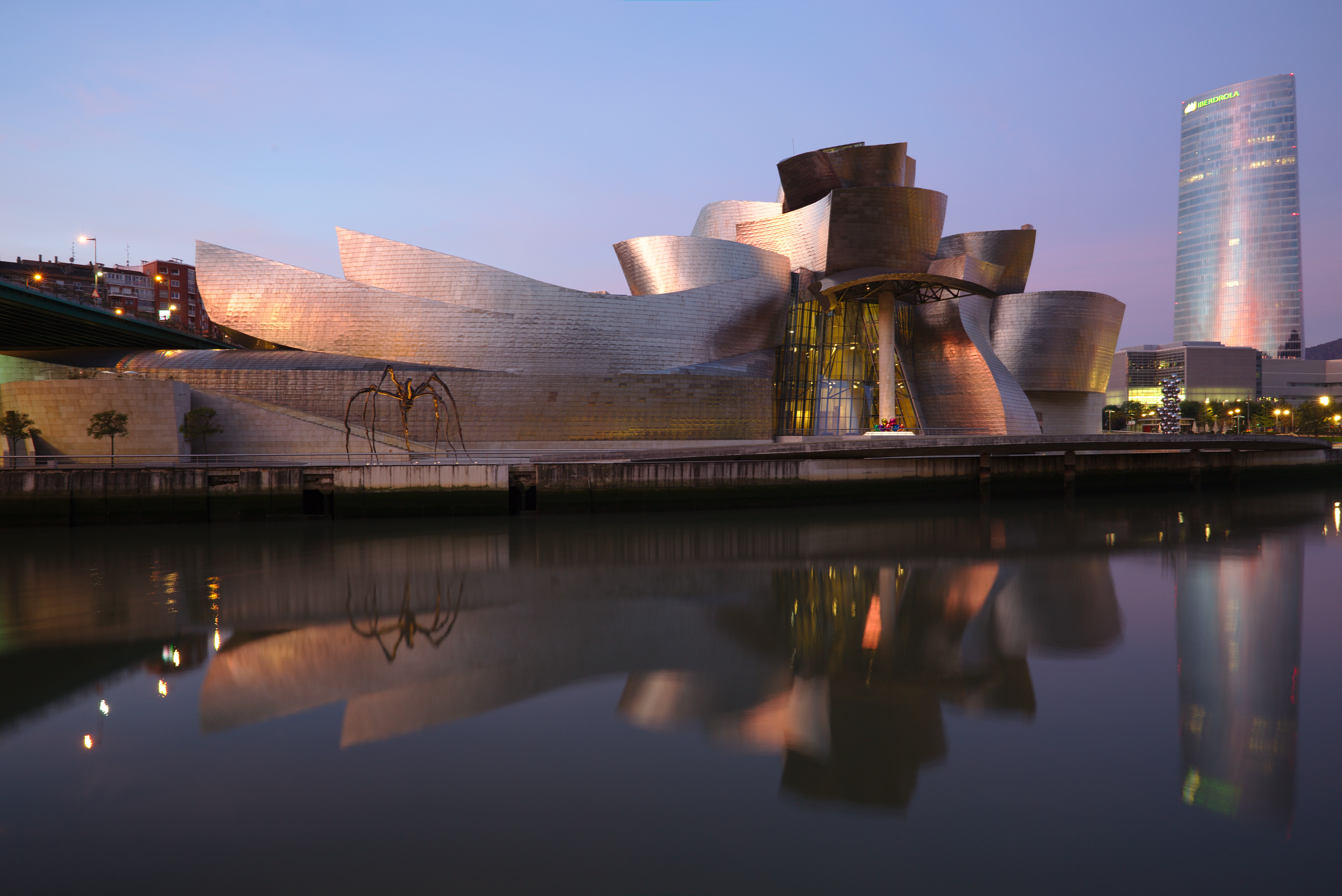
The Guggenheim Museum Bilbao in Bilbao, Spain

The Guggenheim Museums are a group of museums in different parts of the world established (or proposed to be established) by the Solomon R. Guggenheim Foundation.

Museums in this group include:

- The Solomon R. Guggenheim Museum in New York, New York, United States (1937–present)
- The Peggy Guggenheim Collection in Venice, Italy – originally the private collection of Peggy Guggenheim (1951–present)
- Guggenheim Museum Bilbao in Bilbao, Biscay, Spain (1997–present).

Museums under construction:

- The Guggenheim Abu Dhabi, in Abu Dhabi, United Arab Emirates

Former museums include:

- The Deutsche Guggenheim in Berlin, Germany (funded by Deutsche Bank; 1997–2013)
- The Guggenheim Hermitage Museum in Las Vegas, Nevada, United States (2001–2008)

== See also ==
- Guggenheim Helsinki Plan
