= The Venetian Las Vegas =

Casino hotel in Paradise, Nevada

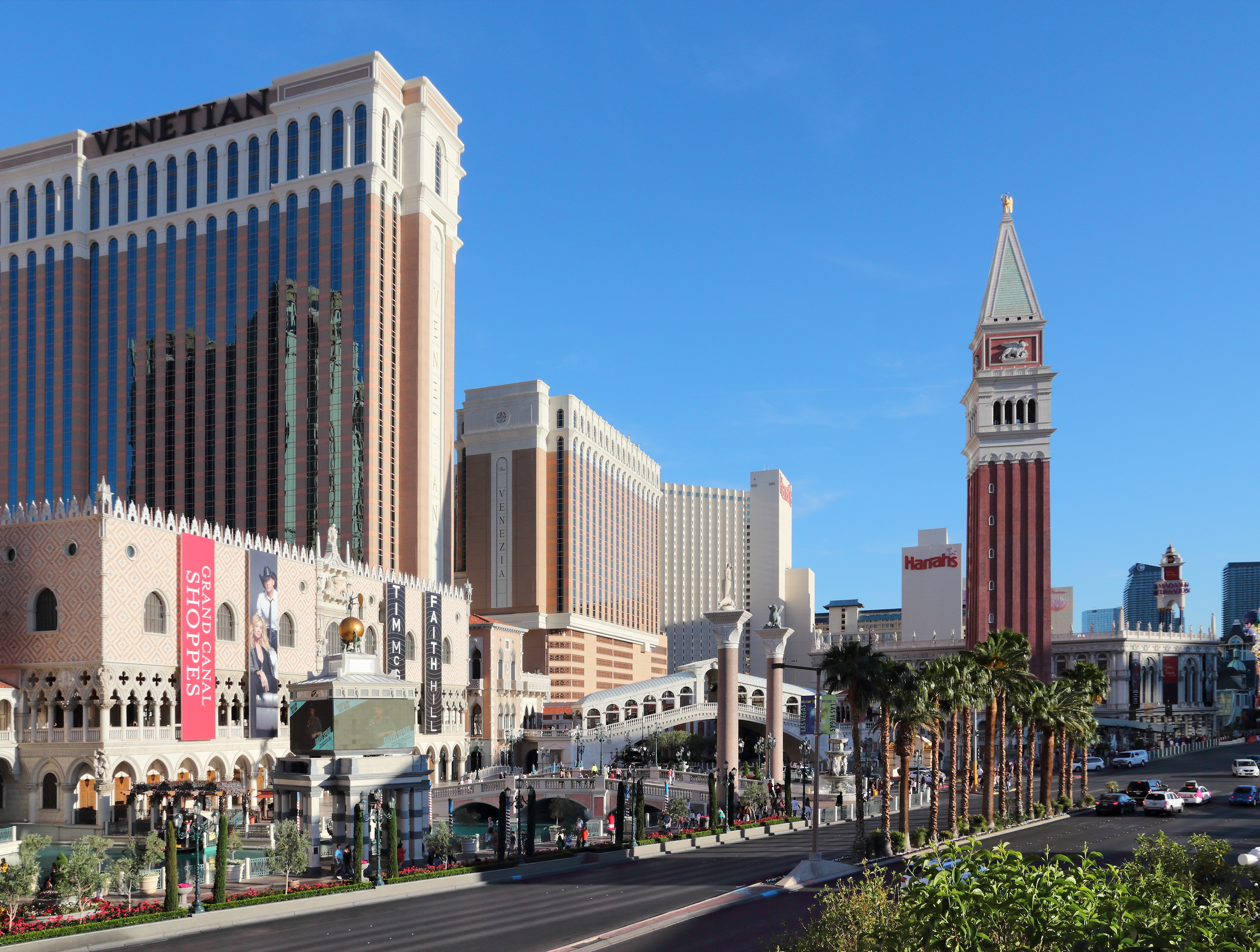

- Location within Las Vegas Strip Location within Nevada
- Interactive map of The Venetian Las Vegas
- Location: Paradise, Nevada, U.S.; 3355 South Las Vegas Boulevard; 36°07′17″N 115°10′08″W
- Opened: May 4, 1999; 27 years ago
- Theme: Venice, Italy
- No. of rooms: 3,036 (1999); 4,049 (2003); ~7,100 (including The Palazzo)
- Gaming space: 120,000 sq ft (11,000 m^{2})
- Permanent shows: Blue Man Group (2005–2012); Phantom: The Las Vegas Spectacular (2006–2012); Rock of Ages (2012–2016); Human Nature (2013–2020)
- Signature attractions: Grand Canal Shoppes; Venetian Expo
- Notable restaurants: Bazaar Meat; Bouchon; COTE; Mott 32; Sushisamba; Tao Asian Bistro; Yardbird Southern Table & Bar
- Casino type: Land-based
- Owner: Vici Properties
- Operating license holder: Apollo Global Management
- Architect: Stubbins Associates; Wimberly Allison Tong & Goo
- Renovated in: 2003, 2015
- Website: venetian.com

The Venetian Las Vegas is a luxury hotel and casino resort located on the Las Vegas Strip in Paradise, Nevada, United States. It is owned by Vici Properties and operated by Apollo Global Management. It was developed by businessman Sheldon Adelson through his company, Las Vegas Sands. The Venetian was built on the former site of the Sands Hotel and Casino, which was closed and demolished in 1996.

Construction on the Venetian began in April 1997, and the resort opened on May 4, 1999. Some amenities had yet to be finished, with construction continuing until the end of the year. Subcontractors later filed mechanic's liens against the resort for unpaid work, leading to lengthy litigation. The Venetian also feuded with the Culinary Workers Union regarding Adelson's decision to open the property as a non-union resort.

The Venetian was designed by Stubbins Associates and Wimberly Allison Tong & Goo. The resort is themed after Venice and has replicas of numerous landmarks from the city, including a canal with gondola rides. The Venetian includes a 120,000 sq ft (11,000 m^{2}) casino and opened with 3,036 suites in a 35-story tower. A 12-story tower, the Venezia, was completed in 2003, bringing the room count to 4,049. The Palazzo, a sister property with its own hotel and casino, opened north of the Venetian in 2007. If considered as a single property, the Venetian-Palazzo complex ranks as the second-largest hotel in the world, with approximately 7,100 rooms.

The Venetian was built to accommodate convention-goers in particular, as Adelson felt that this demographic was underserved in Las Vegas. The resort includes its own meeting space, as well as the adjoining Venetian Expo. The property also includes the Grand Canal Shoppes, and was home to the Guggenheim Hermitage Museum from 2001 to 2008. The Venetian has several performance venues, which have hosted entertainment such as the Blue Man Group (2005–2012), Phantom: The Las Vegas Spectacular (2006–2012), and Human Nature (2013–2020). A sphere-shaped venue and arena, known as simply Sphere, opened in September 2023.

By the end of 2020, Las Vegas Sands sought to focus on its Macau properties, which include The Venetian Macao. In February 2022, Apollo Global Management acquired the operations of the Venetian, Palazzo, and Venetian Expo for $2.25 billion, while Vici Properties purchased the land beneath the facilities for $4 billion. The Venetian and Palazzo approved labor contracts with the Culinary Workers Union in 2024, making them the last resort properties on the Strip to unionize.

== History ==
=== Background and construction ===
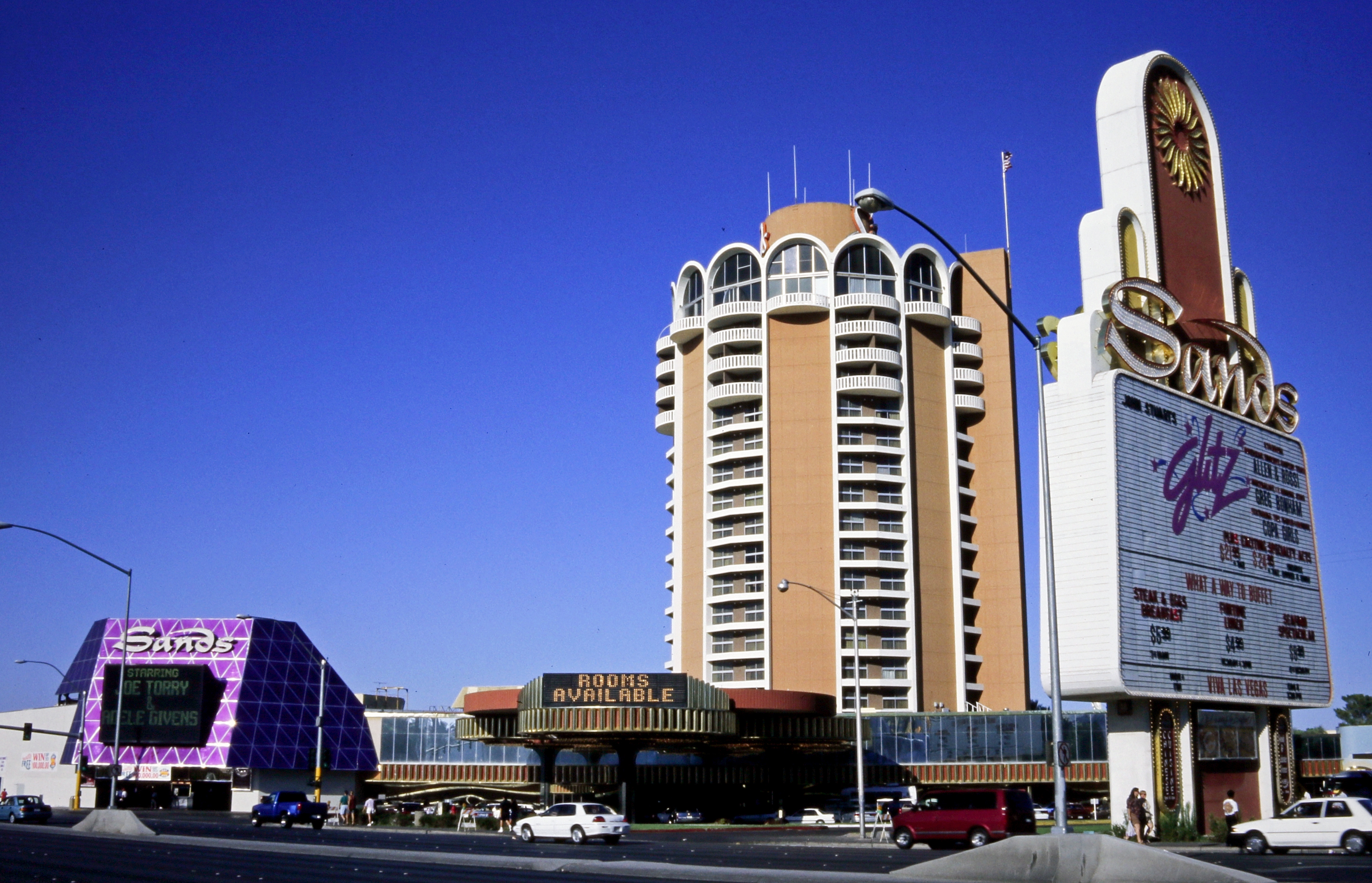
The Sands Hotel and Casino as pictured in 1995, a few years before it was replaced by The Venetian.

The Venetian was built on land previously occupied by the Sands Hotel and Casino, which opened in 1952. Las Vegas Sands, a company founded by businessman Sheldon Adelson, purchased the Sands resort in 1989. Adelson eventually devised plans to replace the aging resort, which he felt was no longer competitive with newer properties. The Sands closed in June 1996, and was demolished five months later to make way for the Venetian.

Construction began on April 14, 1997, with a low-key groundbreaking ceremony. Lehrer McGovern Bovis served as the general contractor. Work began without the issuance of final permits, a strategy used by several previous resorts on the Strip. The Venetian's foundation was poured two months after groundbreaking, followed by the construction of three stories. Further work could not begin until the approval of a traffic study. An extranet was used during construction to keep the project on schedule. It contained 4,500 items, including photos, illustrations, legal documents, and budgets. Project team members, based in various locations, could access the items via the extranet, increasing efficiency.

A key demographic would be convention-goers, whom Adelson considered underserved in Las Vegas. At the end of 1997, the project acquired $523 million in funding through the sale of bonds. The final cost was $1.5 billion. Financial analysts were skeptical about whether the resort would be finished, while gambling executives questioned Adelson's decision to focus on business travelers and conventions. Up to that time, gambling had been the most significant revenue generator in Las Vegas. The Venetian was expected to employ more than 4,000 people, and it saw more than 100,000 applications.

Safety at the construction site was questioned after several incidents, including a worker death in January 1998, which occurred as the result of a fall. At the end of the year, another worker was crushed and killed by an 8,000-pound facade, which fell 32 stories while being lifted by a crane. In February 1999, a trio of workers had to be rescued from the hotel tower's exterior after a cable for their scaffolding became tangled by high winds, stranding the workers 22 stories above ground. In March 1999, a natural gas leak occurred on-site after workers accidentally struck a line, closing one block of the Strip for two hours. The following day, an electrician died after falling more than 30 feet through an open hole, marking the third death since the start of construction. Bovis had previously been fined $9,300 for safety violations which included a lack of fall protection near holes.

=== Opening ===
The opening was initially scheduled for April 21, 1999. Adelson had wanted it to open a week earlier to accommodate convention-goers who were booked at the hotel. However, both opening dates were delayed due to ongoing construction work, as well as building inspections by the county. As a result, 900 convention guests had to be transferred to other hotels.

A soft opening was eventually scheduled for May 3, 1999. A private opening ceremony was held that morning and attended by thousands of VIP guests, including actress Sophia Loren and more than 500 journalists from around the world. County inspections delayed the public opening until 12:45 a.m. the following day. It was one of three new resorts to open on the Strip in 1999, along with Mandalay Bay and Paris Las Vegas.

Because construction was still ongoing, the resort opened without all of its amenities, including a retail mall and some restaurants. Much of the hotel tower was also unavailable initially, due to the inspection work. Because of this, many guests were sent to other resorts. Hotel inspections continued for several days after the opening, with only the first six floors and 320 rooms approved to operate. Construction continued after the opening, and concluded in December 1999. The resort did not receive a permanent certificate of occupancy until June 2001.

=== Construction litigation ===
Shortly after the opening, numerous subcontractors alleged that they were owed money for work performed on the Venetian. More than $230 million in mechanic's liens were filed, including $145 million from Lehrer McGovern Bovis, which also filed a fraud lawsuit against the resort. The Venetian stated that it was not responsible for covering subcontractor costs, according to its contract with Bovis. The resort also said that, despite Adelson's request, Bovis had failed to acquire mechanics-lien waivers when hiring subcontractors. According to Bovis, the Venetian had made more than 400 design changes during the final eight months of construction, while denying requests for construction extensions.

In July 1999, the resort filed a $50 million federal lawsuit against Bovis over the liens, as well as breach of contract. The resort claimed that its reputation had been damaged by the scattered opening of its amenities. Bovis filed its $145 million lien the following month. Both sides subsequently agreed to try resolving the dispute out of court. However, this did not pan out. A civil jury trial eventually began in August 2002, lasting 10 months. It was the longest-running civil jury trial and the largest construction lien case in Nevada history. The trial concluded in June 2003, when jurors found both the Venetian and Bovis in breach of contract. For incomplete and defective construction work, Bovis had to pay $2.3 million in damages to the resort, which was also ordered to pay $44.2 million to Bovis. Las Vegas Sands appealed the decision, and eventually reached an agreement with Bovis in 2005.

=== Subsequent years ===
By 2002, Condé Nast Traveler had named the Venetian as one of North America's top 20 hotels. It had also received Four Diamond and Four Star ratings from American Automobile Association and Mobil Travel Guide respectively. As of 2004, the Venetian was among the most profitable resorts in Las Vegas, second to the Bellagio. A Chinese counterpart, The Venetian Macao, opened in Macau in 2007. That year, the Las Vegas location also added a sister property, The Palazzo. In 2020, readers of USA Today ranked the Venetian and Palazzo among the 10 best casinos in Las Vegas.

In 2004, the Venetian agreed to pay a $1 million penalty to settle a 12-count Gaming Control Board complaint. One of the complaints alleged the resort had held a drawing for a Mercedes-Benz that was rigged to be won by a high roller who had lost a large amount in the casino. The executives involved were fired.

On the morning of October 10, 2012, a man entered a closed gaming area and acquired $1.6 million in casino chips from a locked box that he broke open. He left the resort unnoticed, and the theft was not discovered until the following morning. He was arrested later in the month, with authorities recovering $396,000 in chips.

In 2013, Las Vegas Sands reached a non-prosecution agreement with the U.S. Department of Justice, following a two-year investigation into money laundering at the Venetian. Zhenli Ye Gon, a businessman and high-stakes gambler suspected of drug trafficking, had made numerous large deposits at the casino in 2006 and 2007. Las Vegas Sands acknowledged that it failed to take the matter seriously, and agreed to pay $47.4 million to the Department of Justice.

Like other casinos in Nevada, the Venetian closed indefinitely in March 2020 in response to the COVID-19 pandemic and its effects on the state. The following month, the resort announced plans to incorporate emergency medical personnel and automatic camera-based body temperature scans into its eventual reopening, which occurred on June 4, 2020.

By the end of 2020, Las Vegas Sands wanted to focus on its operations in Macau, as Asia was expected to recover from the pandemic's impact at a faster rate. The company was in early discussions to sell the Venetian, the Palazzo, and the adjoining Sands Expo. Adelson died in January 2021, and Las Vegas Sands announced two months later that it would sell the three Las Vegas facilities for $6.25 billion. Through the deal, Vici Properties bought the land under the facilities for $4 billion, and Apollo Global Management acquired the operations for $2.25 billion as part of a triple net lease agreement with Vici. The sale was finalized in February 2022.

== Union history ==
=== Background ===
Before the start of construction, Adelson indicated that the Venetian would be a non-union resort, unlike the Sands. This prompted criticism from the Culinary Workers Union, which represents the majority of Strip resort workers. The union wanted Adelson to rehire Sands workers without going through the application process. In March 1997, the union urged Clark County Commissioners to reject the Venetian project, citing traffic concerns if it should be built. Later that year, the union held protests in front of a Venetian preview center, which resulted in a restraining order that limited the level of noise allowed during the protests.

Resort executives said the property would offer a wages and benefits package matching or exceeding those offered by the union. Adelson outsourced key elements of the resort to third parties, including restaurant and retail operations. He said it would be up to employees to decide on unionization, stating that the Culinary's actions were an "attempt to intimidate employers like me into signing contracts for workers I haven't hired yet, to stop me from trying to give my future employees a chance to choose whether they want union representation, and stop me from attracting like-minded, brand-name restaurateurs who want to give their employees that same freedom to choose". The union sought assurance that the Venetian would take a neutral stance during eventual union elections. Ultimately, the resort never unionized under Las Vegas Sands' ownership.

=== 1999 protests and aftermath ===
A traffic study had determined that the public sidewalk in front of the future Venetian had to be removed, allowing for a widening of Las Vegas Boulevard. In an agreement with the county, the resort built a sidewalk on its own property with the condition that it be accessible by the public. More than 1,000 Culinary members picketed on the sidewalk in front of the resort on March 1, 1999, two months prior to its opening. Resort officials accused them of trespassing and warned of arrests, although the district attorney determined the sidewalks to be public property. Georgia congressman John Lewis spoke at the rally and also attempted to meet with Adelson, who turned down the offer because Lewis wanted to include union representatives. Although the protest had a permit to proceed, the Venetian contacted the Las Vegas Metropolitan Police Department (LVMPD) to intervene, despite the latter stating that it would not do so. The Venetian used loudspeakers to warn union members against protesting in front of the resort, and one Venetian security guard performed a citizen's arrest on a union member.

Several days after the protest, the resort filed a federal lawsuit against the union, the county, the district attorney, and the LVMPD. The resort stated that the protest took place on a private walkway separate from the sidewalk, and it sought a court order declaring the former as private property. The union responded: "We've been through this before, and we'll be through it again. We've battled this guy before, and we'll battle him as long as it takes. We're never going away. It's a long way from over". A judge denied the Venetian's request for a restraining order, and thousands of Culinary members protested at the resort's grand opening. However, most tourists were reportedly unaware or uninterested in the union battle, proceeding to visit the property. The Venetian accused the union of trespassing and unlawful picketing, and filed suit to prevent such activity in the future. A district court ruled later in 1999 that the resort's sidewalks constitute a public forum where individuals can exercise their First Amendment rights. The decision was appealed but upheld in 2001.

After the district court ruling, the union filed a complaint with the National Labor Relations Board (NLRB) in regard to the sidewalk dispute. The agency eventually determined that the resort violated the National Labor Relations Act (NLRA). The Venetian appealed, but eventually lost the case when it went to the U.S. Supreme Court, which declined to hear it in 2008. However, a year later, the NLRB did withdraw its finding that the Venetian violated the NLRA when it contacted police.

=== 2020s: Apollo union neutrality ===
After Apollo's purchase was announced in 2021, the Culinary union questioned the company's prior management of Caesars Entertainment, which included a workforce cut of more than 20,000 over a 10-year period. Upon taking ownership in 2022, Apollo expressed no opposition to unionization. In 2023, a card check neutrality agreement was reached between Apollo and the Culinary union, the Bartenders Union Local 165 and the International Union of Operating Engineers Local 501, and with Teamsters Local 986 for joint negotiations. Under the deal, employees would determine whether to unionize while Apollo management refrains from taking a position on the matter. On September 19, 2024, the Venetian and Palazzo approved a Culinary Workers Union labor contract, making them the last resort properties on the Strip to unionize.

== Design ==
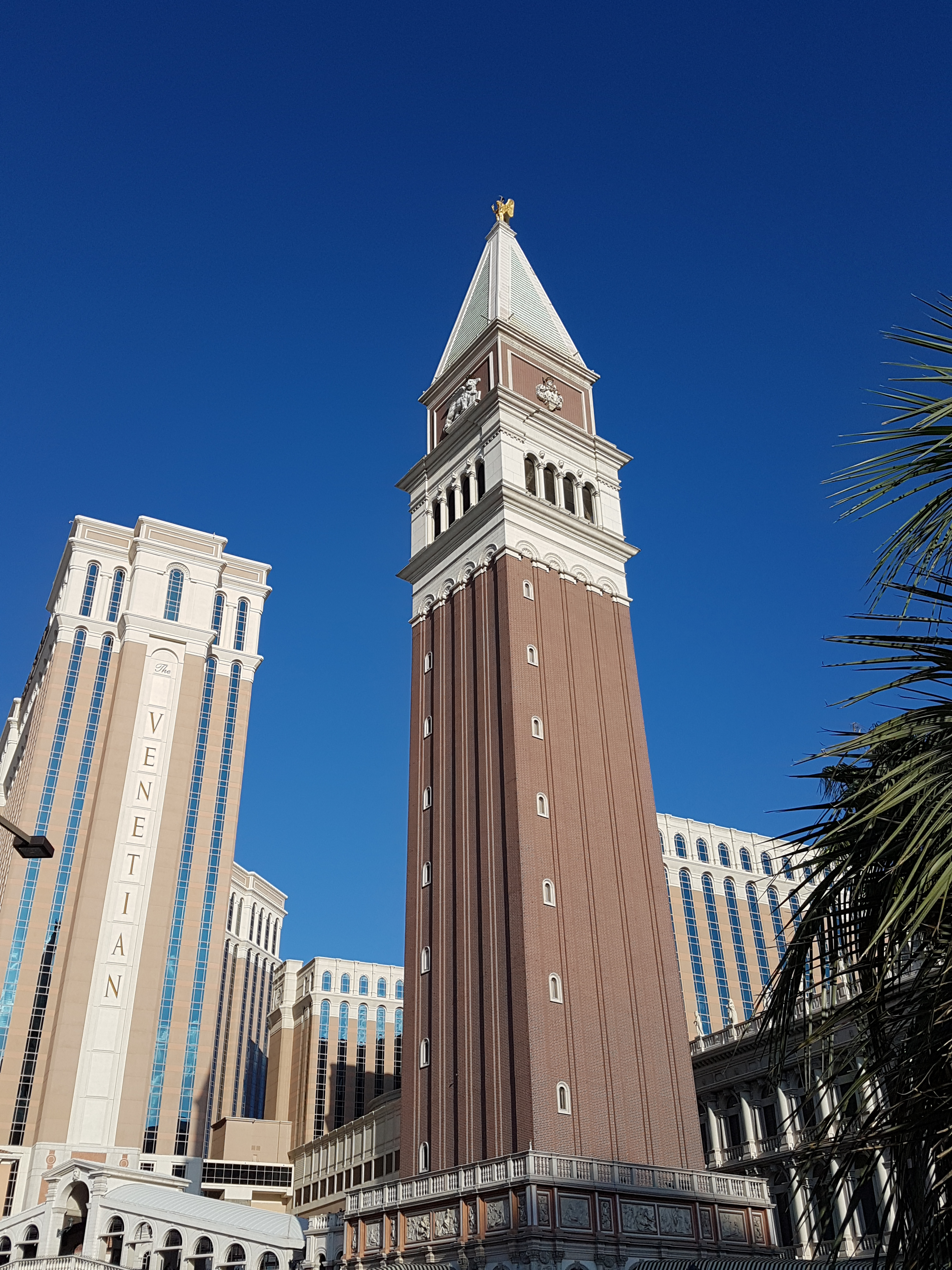
Recreation of St Mark's Campanile at the Venetian

The Venetian is themed after Venice during the 1400s and 1500s, and it features numerous landmarks from the city. Initially, Adelson did not plan for the resort to have a theme. His second wife, Miriam, eventually suggested theming the resort after Venice, where they had honeymooned in 1991.

Two architectural firms worked on the project: Stubbins Associates, and Wimberly Allison Tong & Goo. Many of the resort's landmarks and statues were created by Treadway Industries. The design project included 250 artists and sculptors. For historical authenticity, the resort hired two Venice historians, while Treadway sent a team there to photograph the city. Venice mayor Massimo Cacciari was critical of the design, calling it a "mega-galactic example of kitsch" and comparing the resort with a "street walker".

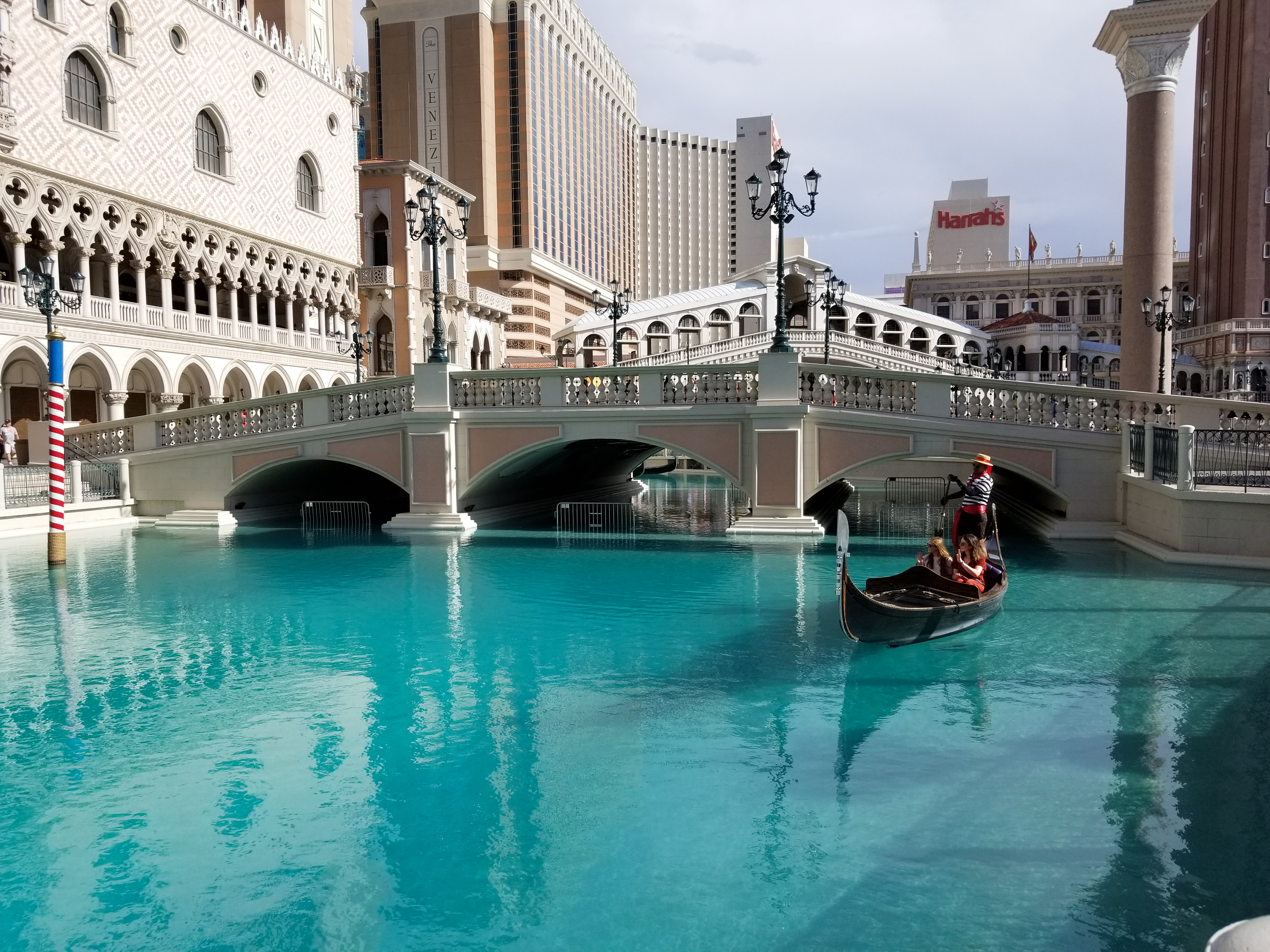
Outdoor canal

The exterior entrance along the Las Vegas Strip is modeled on the Doge's Palace and includes a recreation of the Rialto Bridge. It also features a 315-foot-high (96 m) replica of St Mark's Campanile, topped by a statue depicting Gabriel. A revolving restaurant or lounge had been considered for the top of the tower, but it was deemed too small, measuring only 40 square feet. The Grand Canal Shoppes occupy an indoor plaza with a recreation of St. Mark's Square and features a sky-painted ceiling. Another area of the resort features 21 faux Renaissance-era paintings that were framed and attached to the ceiling.

The Venetian includes a replica of Venice's Grand Canal that goes through the resort's interior and exterior. Gondolas travel throughout the canal, and visitors can ride on them for a fee. In 2013, the indoor canals were drained for a month-long renovation, the first since the resort opened. At the time, the gondolas attracted 500,000 riders per year.

== Features ==
=== Casino and hotel ===
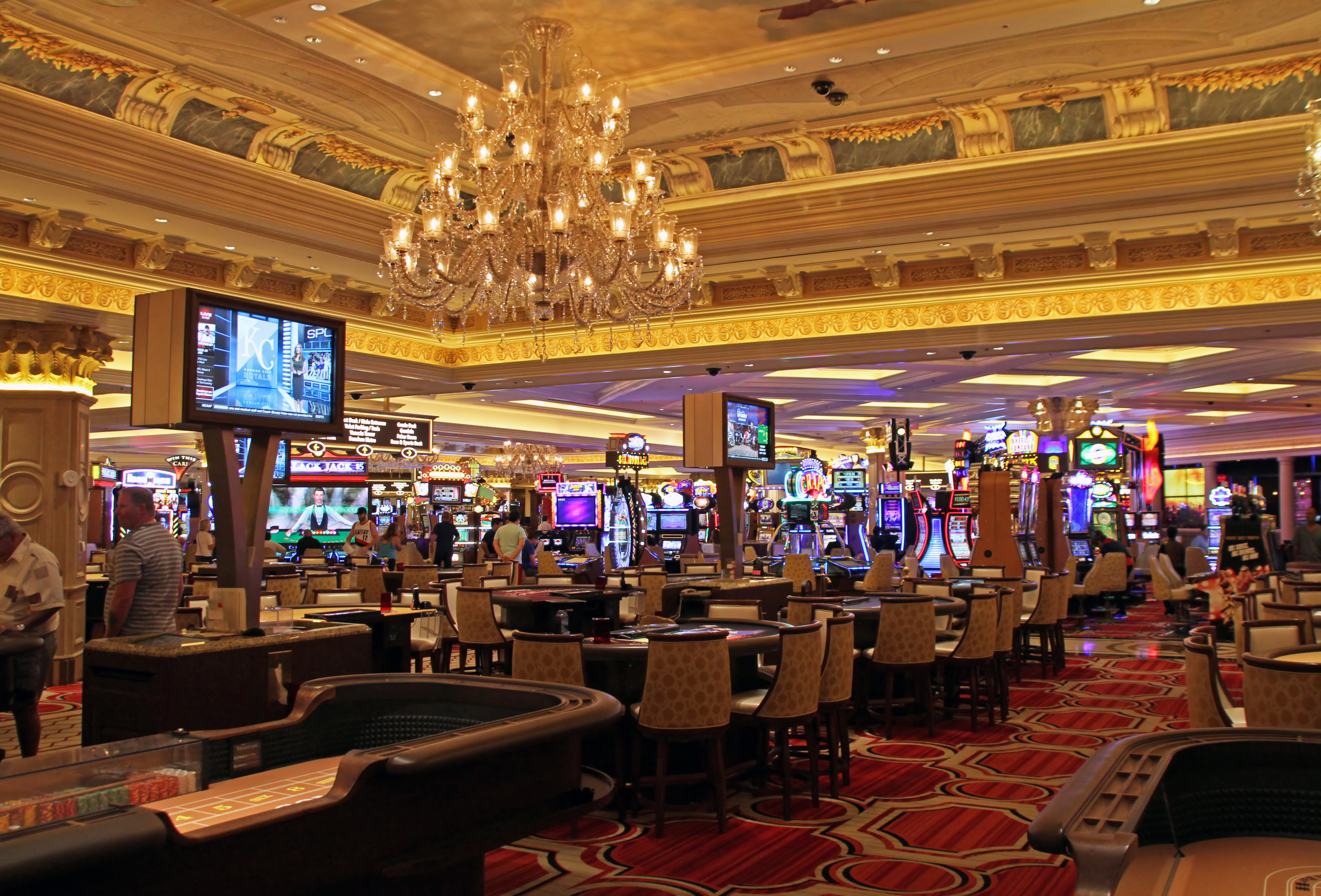
Venetian casino floor, 2014

The Venetian includes a 120,000 sq ft (11,000 m^{2}) casino. Due to lack of demand, the resort's poker room closed in 2000, with plans to expand the race and sports book. Amid a resurgence in poker popularity, the resort added a new $2.6 million poker room in 2006, featuring 39 tables. At 11,000 sq ft (1,000 m^{2}), it was the third largest poker room on the Strip. The resort eventually replaced it with the larger Sands Poker Room, which debuted in 2012. It was the largest on the Strip, measuring 14,000 sq ft (1,300 m^{2}). A new space of equal size, named The Poker Room, opened in 2024.

In 2001, the Venetian announced changes aimed at accommodating high rollers. This would include expansion of the baccarat pit, modifications to 18 suites, and the addition of semi-private gaming and dining areas. In 2005, the Venetian opened the Paiza Club, a high-rise private gaming area catering to Asian high rollers. Las Vegas Sands had opened the Sands Macao in China a year earlier, building up a new customer base in Asia.

In 2006, Nevada became the first state to approve mobile gambling, and the Venetian reached a deal with Cantor Gaming to provide such a service at the resort. The mobile gaming devices, developed and operated by Cantor, offered games such as blackjack and video poker. They were usable in public areas of the resort such as restaurants and the pool area. The Venetian introduced the devices in 2008, becoming the first Las Vegas resort to offer them. Cantor took over the Venetian's sports book operations in 2011, and spent $30 million to renovate the facility, which measured 10,000 sq ft (930 m^{2}). A high-limit slot salon opened in 2013, featuring 118 machines and butler service.

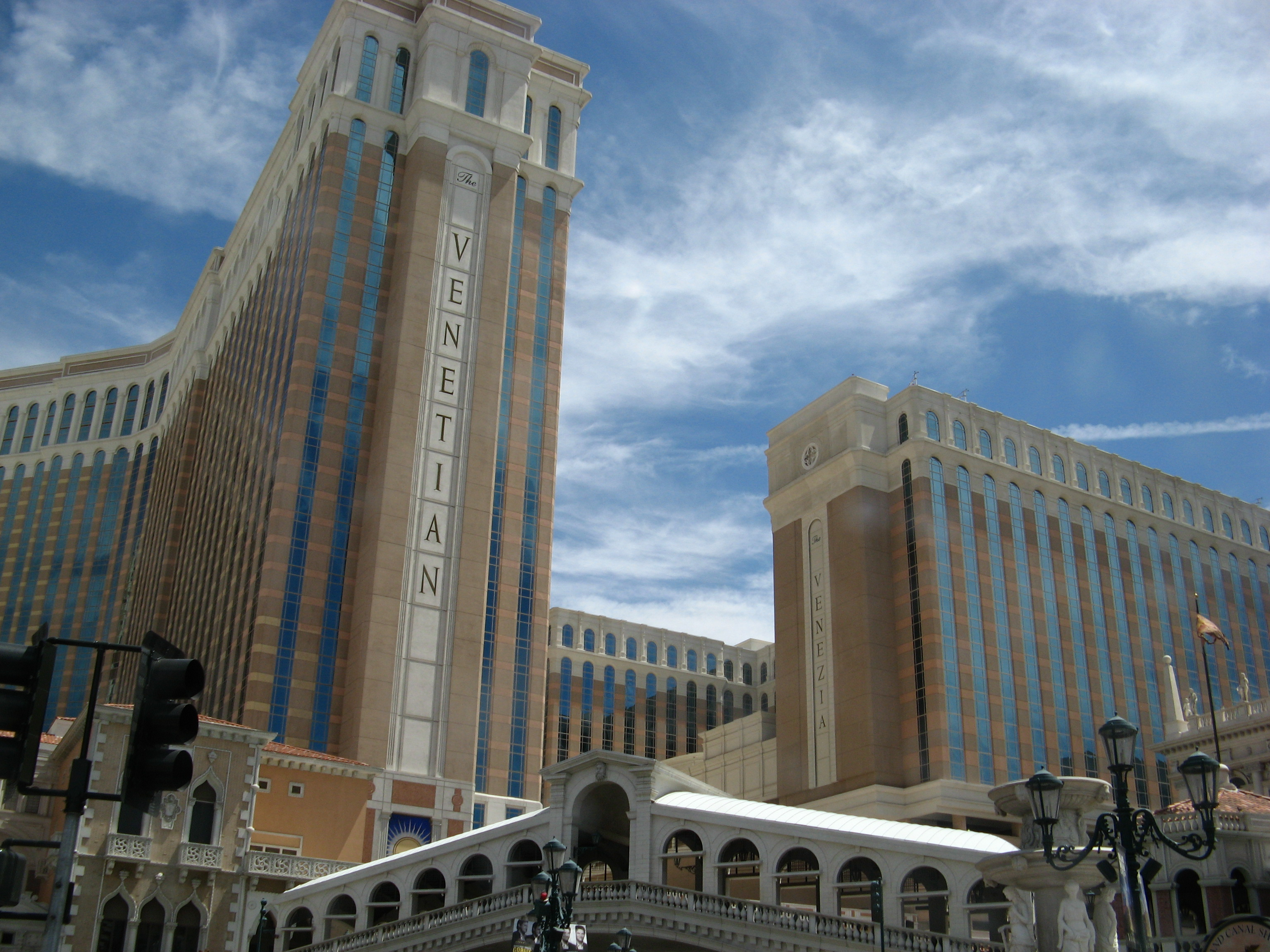
The Venetian and Venezia towers

The Venetian opened with 3,036 suites. The original hotel tower is 35 stories and 480 feet in height. Plans were evaluated in 2000 for a second tower, to be built atop the resort's 10-story parking garage. Construction eventually began in July 2002. The 12-story Venezia tower opened in June 2003 and added 1,013 rooms, for a total of 4,049.

The 50-story Palazzo, directly north of the Venetian, includes more than 3,000 rooms. When considered as a single property, the Venetian-Palazzo complex ranked as the world's largest hotel, with approximately 7,100 rooms. It lost this title to the First World Hotel in 2015. The complex has a total of 225,000 sq ft (20,900 m^{2}) in gaming space.

In 2010, the Venetian and Palazzo partnered with InterContinental Hotels Group through a 10-year deal. The Venetian rooms were renovated in 2015. Two years later, the Venetian became the first Las Vegas resort to allow hotel bookings through Facebook Messenger.

=== Clubs and lounges ===
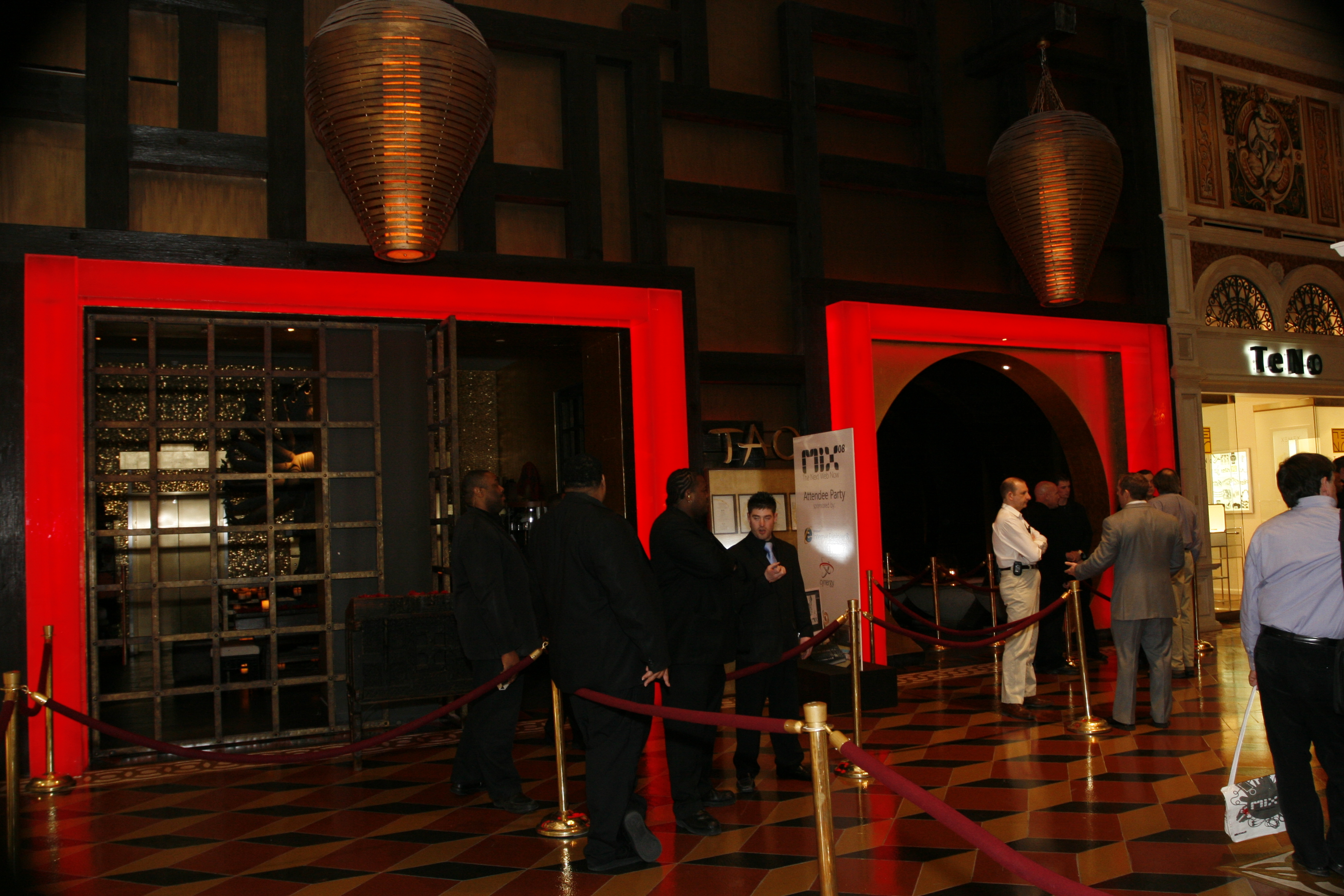
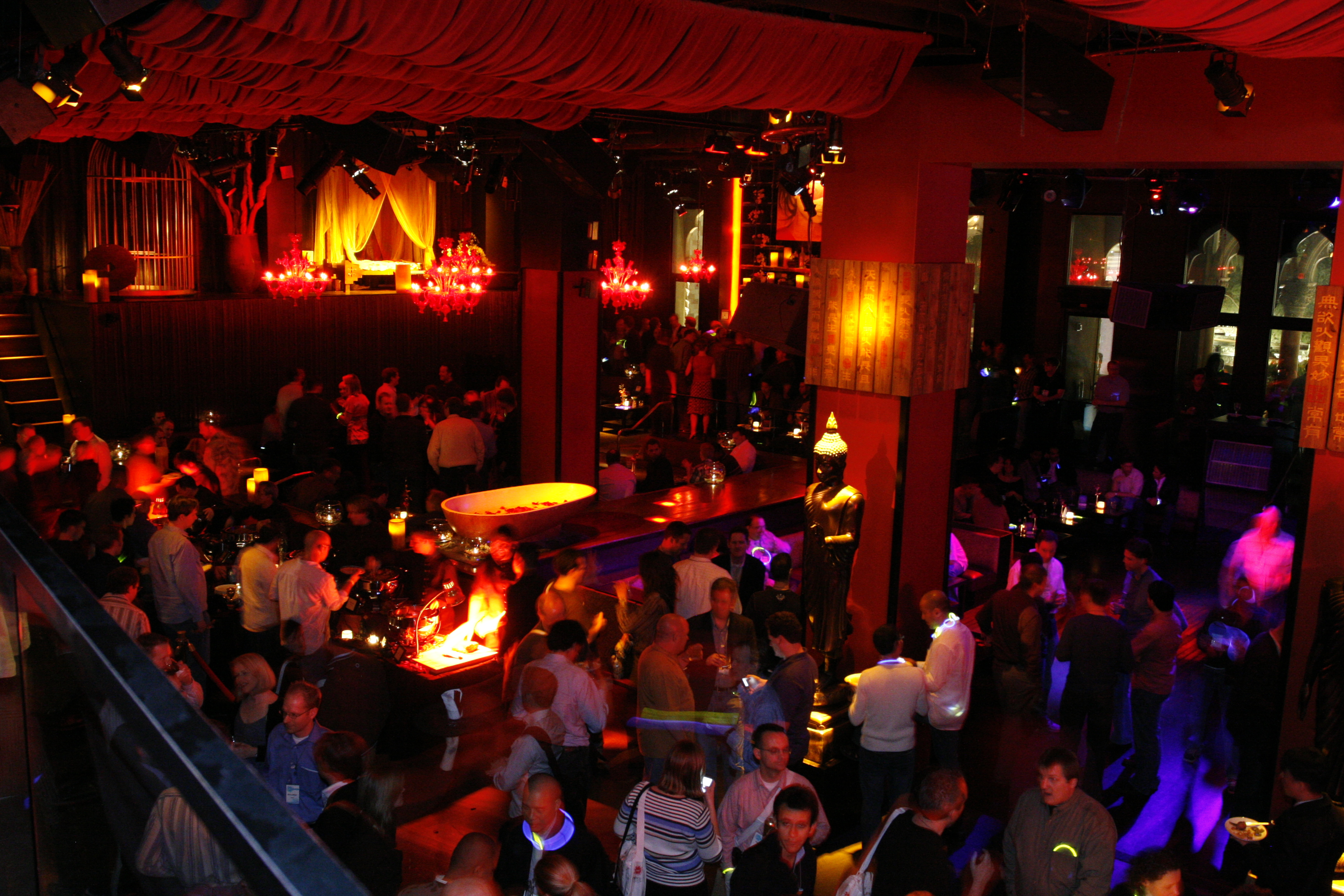
Tao club entrance and interior

A nightclub, C2K, opened in late 1999 and was leased out to a third-party operator. The Venetian closed the club in August 2000, alleging rampant drug use and sexual activities. The closure came a month after a woman died at the club of an ecstasy overdose. It reopened two months later, under new management.

In its early years, the Venetian included a club known as the Venus Lounge. In 2005, Vivid Entertainment leased the space and opened it as Vivid, a 7,000 sq ft (650 m^{2}) nightclub. Vivid closed in 2006, and sat vacant until the 2009 opening of Smokin' Hot Aces, a rock and roll bar.

Tao Asian Bistro, a popular nightclub and restaurant, opened in 2005. It covers 60,000 sq ft (5,600 m^{2}), including 12,000 sq ft (1,100 m^{2}) for the nightclub. A dayclub, known as Tao Beach, opened in 2007. The five-acre Tao Beach covers the nightclub's rooftop.

In 2012, the Venetian opened The Bourbon Room, a 1980s-themed lounge. It took over the former La Scena lounge and accompanied the resort's new Rock of Ages show, which was performed in a separate venue. The show and lounge closed in early 2016. The Bourbon Room was replaced by the Dorsey, a cocktail bar opened later in 2016. It went on to become one of the most popular bars in Las Vegas. It is scheduled to close in June 2023, to be replaced by Juliet Cocktail Room.

=== Restaurants ===
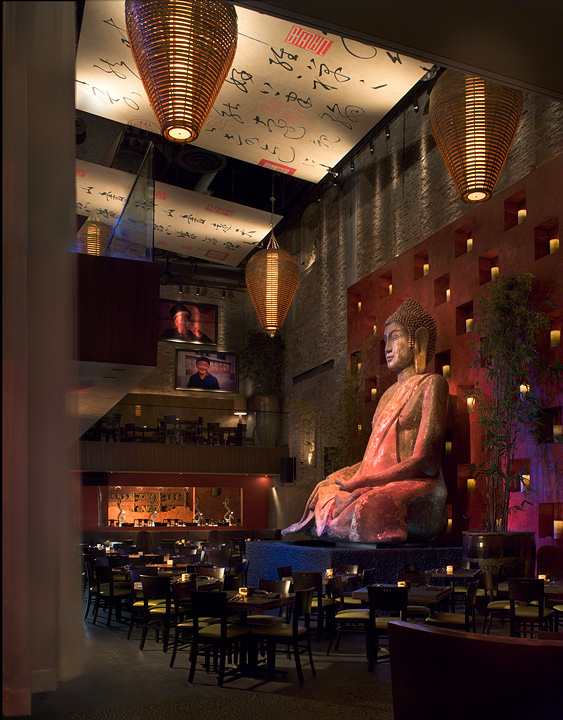
Tao restaurant interior

The Venetian initially featured 15 restaurants, three of which were ready for the resort's soft opening. Notable chefs at the resort included Emeril Lagasse, Joachim Splichal, Stephan Pyles, and Wolfgang Puck. In contrast to most Las Vegas resorts, the Venetian opened without a buffet, as Adelson sought an upper-class clientele: "The people who want buffets are not consistent with the luxury and quality that we've put together here".

Tao Asian Bistro has consistently ranked as the highest-grossing independent restaurant in the U.S. since its 2005 opening, in part due to alcohol sales in its bar. The restaurant features Asian decor, including a giant Buddha statue. Another restaurant, Royal Star, also served Chinese food until its closure in 2006.

Bouchon, a French bistro by chef Thomas Keller, has operated since 2004. It is located in the Venezia tower and was designed by Adam Tihany. Yardbird Southern Table & Bar opened its second location in 2015, at the Venetian. Chef Mario Batali had two restaurants at the Venetian, both of which closed in 2018, after sexual misconduct allegations were made against him. Estiatorio Milos Las Vegas, a Greek seafood restaurant, opened in 2021.

=== Convention space ===
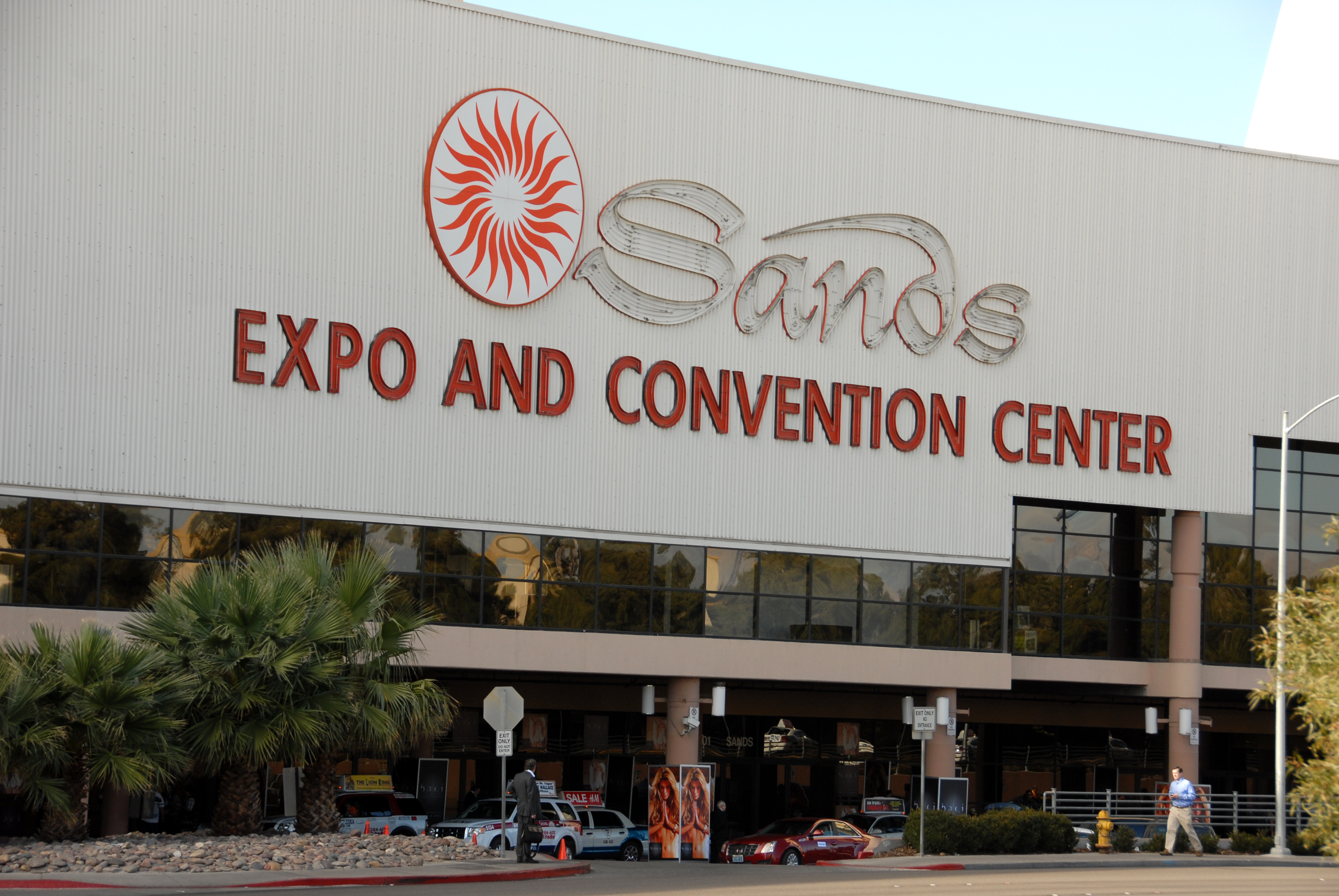
The Venetian Expo in 2010, under its former name

The resort opened with the Venetian Congress Center, offering 500,000 sq ft (46,000 m^{2}) of meeting space, in addition to the adjoining Sands Expo behind the Venetian, which opened in 1990 as part of the earlier Sands resort. A 150,000 sq ft (14,000 m^{2}) expansion of the Congress Center and Sands Expo brought the resort's total meeting space to 1.9-million sq ft (180,000 m^{2}). The expansion cost $45 million and was finished in 2003.

The Venetian helped popularize Las Vegas as a convention city, particularly thanks to its Sands Expo. Las Vegas Sands renamed it as the Venetian Expo in 2021, while in the process of selling the facility. The Venetian Congress Center was also renamed The Venetian Convention Center.

=== Museums ===
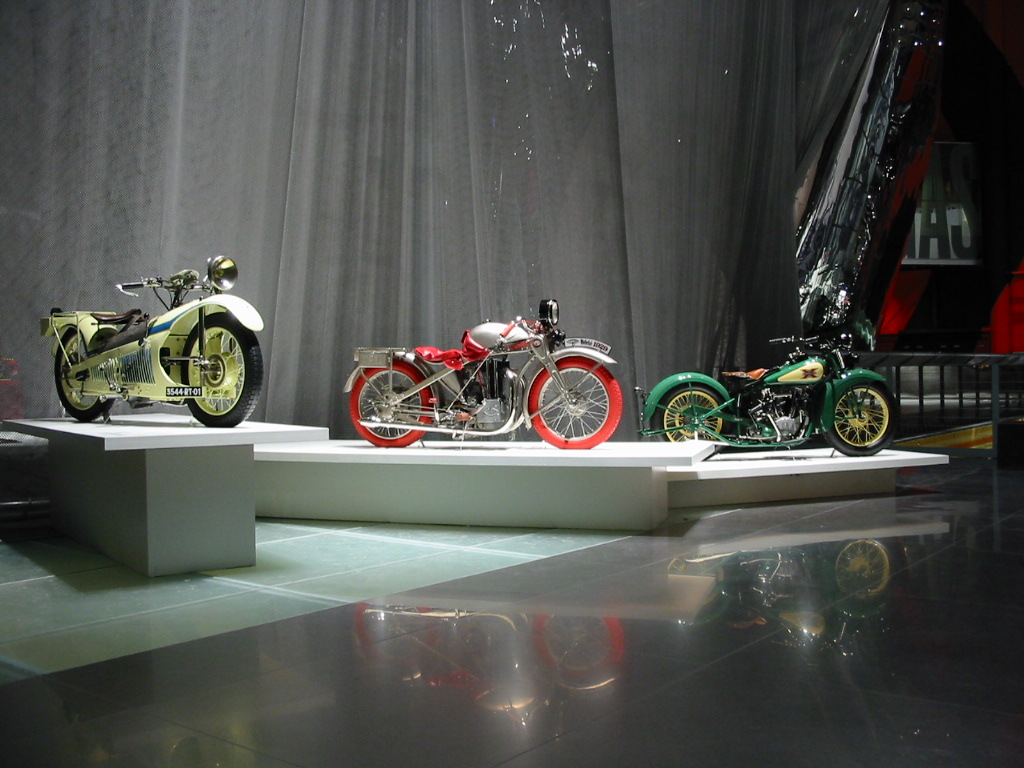
The Art of the Motorcycle at Guggenheim Las Vegas, January 2003

Two museums, affiliated with the Solomon R. Guggenheim Foundation, opened at the Venetian on October 7, 2001. Both were designed by architect Rem Koolhaas.

- The Guggenheim Las Vegas operated in a 63,700 sq ft (5,920 m^{2}) building until January 2003, hosting only one exhibit up to that point: Guggenheim's The Art of the Motorcycle. The facility and exhibition cost $37 million to develop, and averaged 666 daily visitors; it needed 3,000 to 4,000 to justify operating expenses. The low attendance was partly attributed to decreased tourism brought on by the September 11 attacks. Several new exhibits had been considered as replacements, but none came to fruition due to lack of funding. The Venetian announced in May 2003 that the Guggenheim Las Vegas space would become a new performance theater for the resort.
- The Guggenheim Hermitage Museum operated in partnership with the State Hermitage Museum in Saint Petersburg. The facility measured 7,660 sq ft (712 m^{2}) and hosted 10 exhibitions before closing in May 2008.

=== Other features ===
Since 1999, the resort has included a Madame Tussaud's wax museum, marking the first U.S. location. The resort also features the Grand Canal Shoppes, an 875,000 sq ft (81,300 m^{2}) shopping mall. In 2000, the Venetian became the first Strip resort to open a child-care center for its employees. The Venetian opened with five pools, and the 2003 Venezia addition included another pool deck and the resort's first wedding chapel. Upon its opening, the resort also included the 63,000 sq ft (5,900 m^{2}) Canyon Ranch SpaClub. The spa was expanded during construction of the Palazzo, bringing it to 134,000 sq ft (12,400 m^{2}). It is among the largest spa and fitness centers in Las Vegas.

== Entertainment venues ==
=== Showroom ===
The Venetian's C2K club served as the resort's original performance venue, known as the Showroom during live entertainment. It was managed by H&H; Entertainment, which leased the space from the resort and rented it out to performers. The venue struggled in its early years, and the Venetian had a strained relationship with H&H;, disagreeing with the type of shows being put on. Performers – such as impressionist André-Philippe Gagnon, magician Melinda Saxe, and singer Robert Goulet – also had disagreements with H&H;'s management style. In its early years, the Showroom had been host to several shows, though none garnered substantial success until the 2003 openings of Lord of the Dance and V: The Ultimate Variety Show.

=== Voltaire ===
Lord of the Dance and V both closed in 2004, making way for construction of a new theater with 1,760 seats. The Blue Man Group opened in the new space in 2005, and performed there until 2012. The Blue Man Group Theatre subsequently became the Rock of Ages Theatre, hosting the Rock of Ages musical from 2012 to 2016, with more than 1,000 performances during that time. The theater sat vacant for the next year, eventually hosting Steely Dan in 2017, under the new name of Opaline Theatre.

A circus-themed show by Base Entertainment, titled Revive, was being developed for the Opaline Theatre, but was canceled in 2018, stalling plans to renovate the venue. Base later used the theater as a rehearsal space for other, off-site shows. The venue otherwise remained vacant for years.

In 2023, the space was reopened as a club and venue known as Voltaire, with a reduced capacity of 1,000. The venue has held residencies for singers Kylie Minogue and Christina Aguilera, and also hosted Belle de Nuit, a Parisian-style cabaret. Dita von Teese began a residency featuring a theatrical adult revue in September 2024.

In November 2025 to January 2026, singer Leona Lewis held a Christmas residency in the venue

=== Venetian Theatre ===
In 2003, the Venetian announced that Guggenheim Las Vegas would be converted into a second performance venue. The new theater has seating for 1,815 people. It debuted with Phantom: The Las Vegas Spectacular, a shortened, 95-minute version of The Phantom of the Opera. The theater cost $42 million to build, and the show's production cost another $35 million. The show opened in 2006, and ran for six years, ending after nearly 2,700 performances. The former Phantom Theatre has since been renamed the Venetian Theatre.

At the end of 2012, country singers Tim McGraw and Faith Hill took over the theater space for a 10-weekend series of concerts. In 2013, they signed on for another 10-weekend set of shows. Georgia on My Mind, a Ray Charles tribute show, ran during 2014, with Clint Holmes, Nnenna Freelon, and Take 6 as performers. Although scheduled for a six-week run, it closed two weeks early due to poor ticket sales. In 2015, after nearly five years, The Judds reunited for a series of shows at the Venetian. Rock singer-songwriter John Fogerty also had a concert residency in the theater during 2016, in a show incorporating smoke and pyrotechnics. The new wave band The B-52s are scheduled for residencies at the theater in 2023 and 2024.

=== The Summit ===
A third performance venue, the Gordie Brown Theatre, was added in October 2006, taking former ballroom space. The 742-seat venue was custom-built to host singer Gordie Brown, with a design by The Rockwell Group. In 2007, Wayne Brady also signed on to perform in the venue, which was renamed the Venetian Showroom.

Brown ended his run in 2008. An interactive game show, The Real Deal, ran in the Venetian Showroom later that year. The show involved certain audience members being selected to compete against professional poker players. It was produced by Merv Adelson, who was later accused by the resort of stopping production and thereby breaching contract. In 2009, actor Chazz Palminteri performed his one-man show, A Bronx Tale, in the showroom.

In 2013, pop musical group Human Nature began performing in the space, which was renamed the Sands Showroom. Human Nature ended its show in 2020, amid uncertainty regarding the COVID-19 pandemic.

In 2014, the resort debuted an all-female comedy series in the Sands Showroom. Puppets Up! Uncensored, an adult-oriented puppet show, opened in the showroom in July 2016. The short-lived show, created by Brian Henson and directed by Patrick Bristow, closed in September 2016.

In 2021, the Sands Showroom was renamed The Summit, and Derek Hough launched a dance show which continued into the following year. Lin-Manuel Miranda and his musical group Freestyle Love Supreme had a residency in the showroom from 2022 to 2023.

=== Sphere ===
A sphere-shaped music and entertainment arena, known as simply Sphere, opened in September 2023. It is located directly east of the Venetian. The arena's interior is covered in LED screens which accompany live entertainment. The venue includes seating for 17,500 people.

== Gallery ==
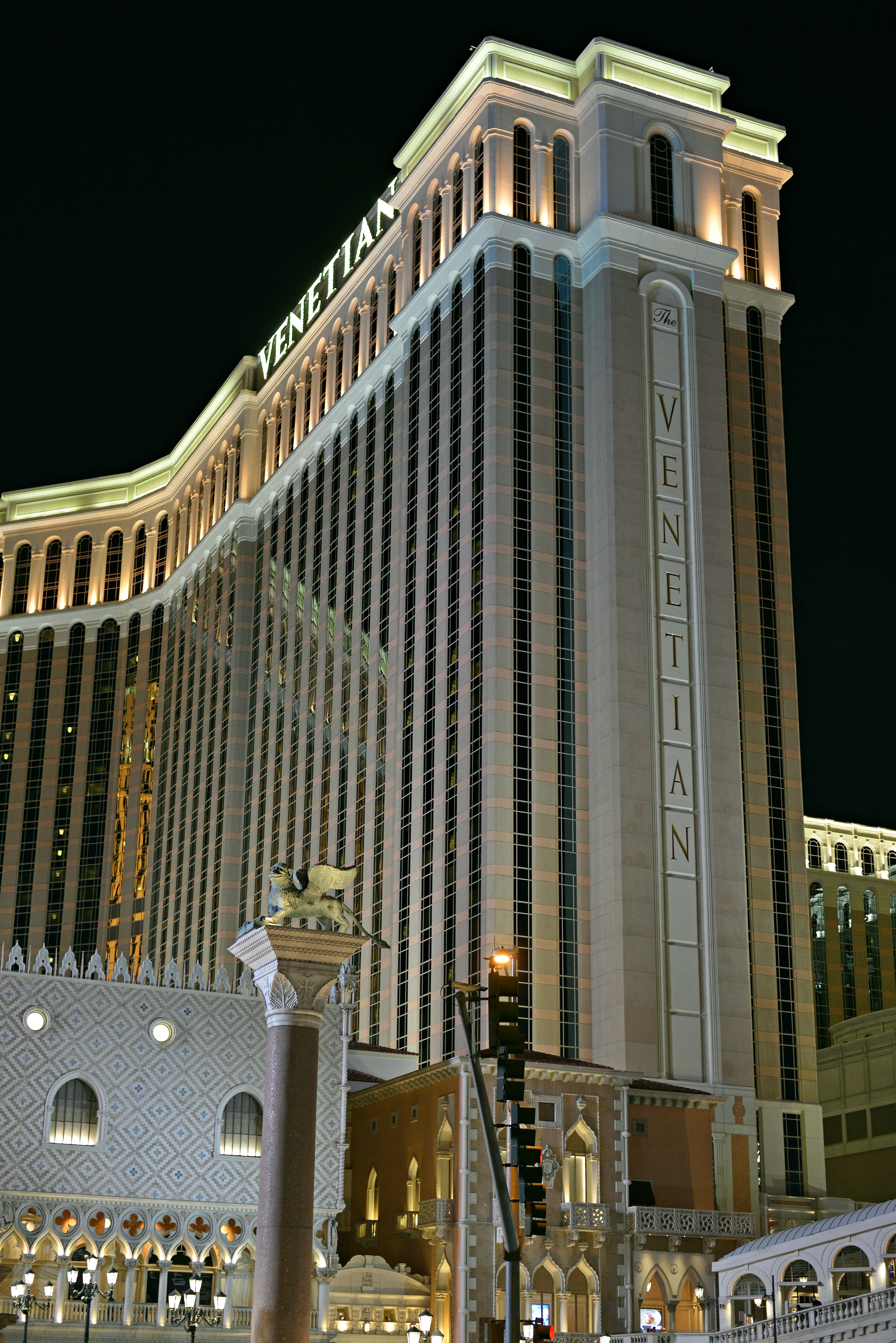
Hotel tower at night

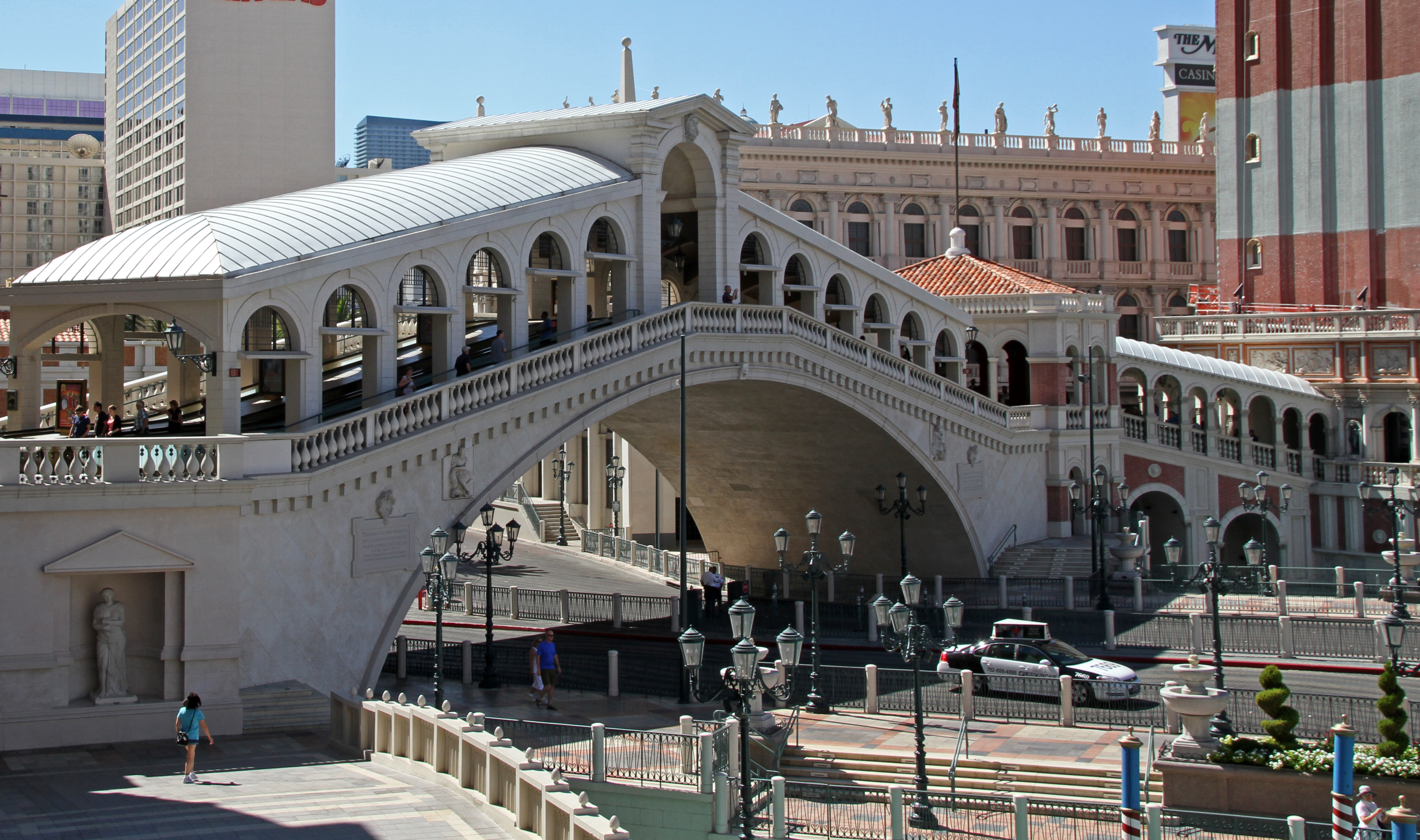
Rialto Bridge recreation

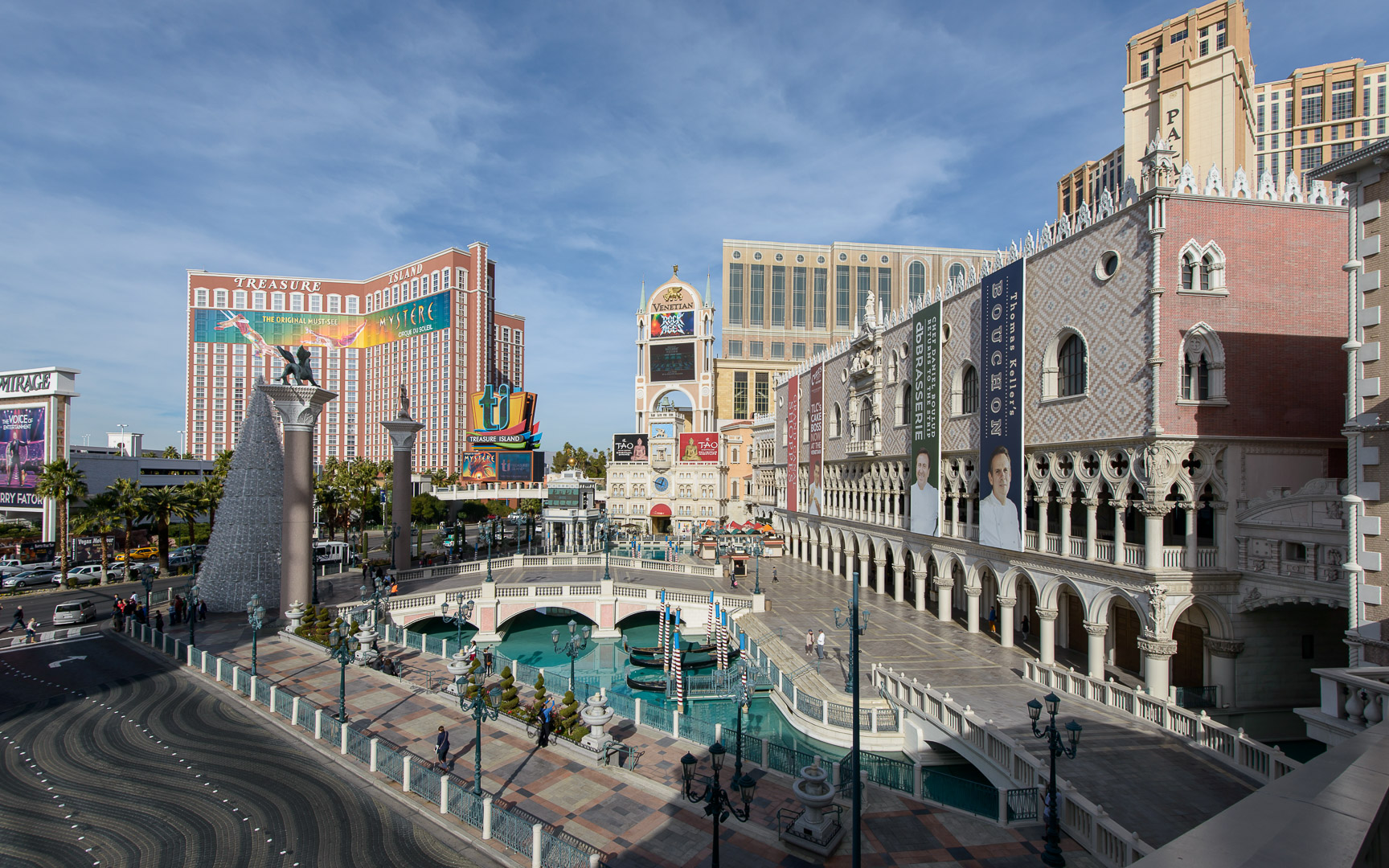
Entry plaza along the Strip

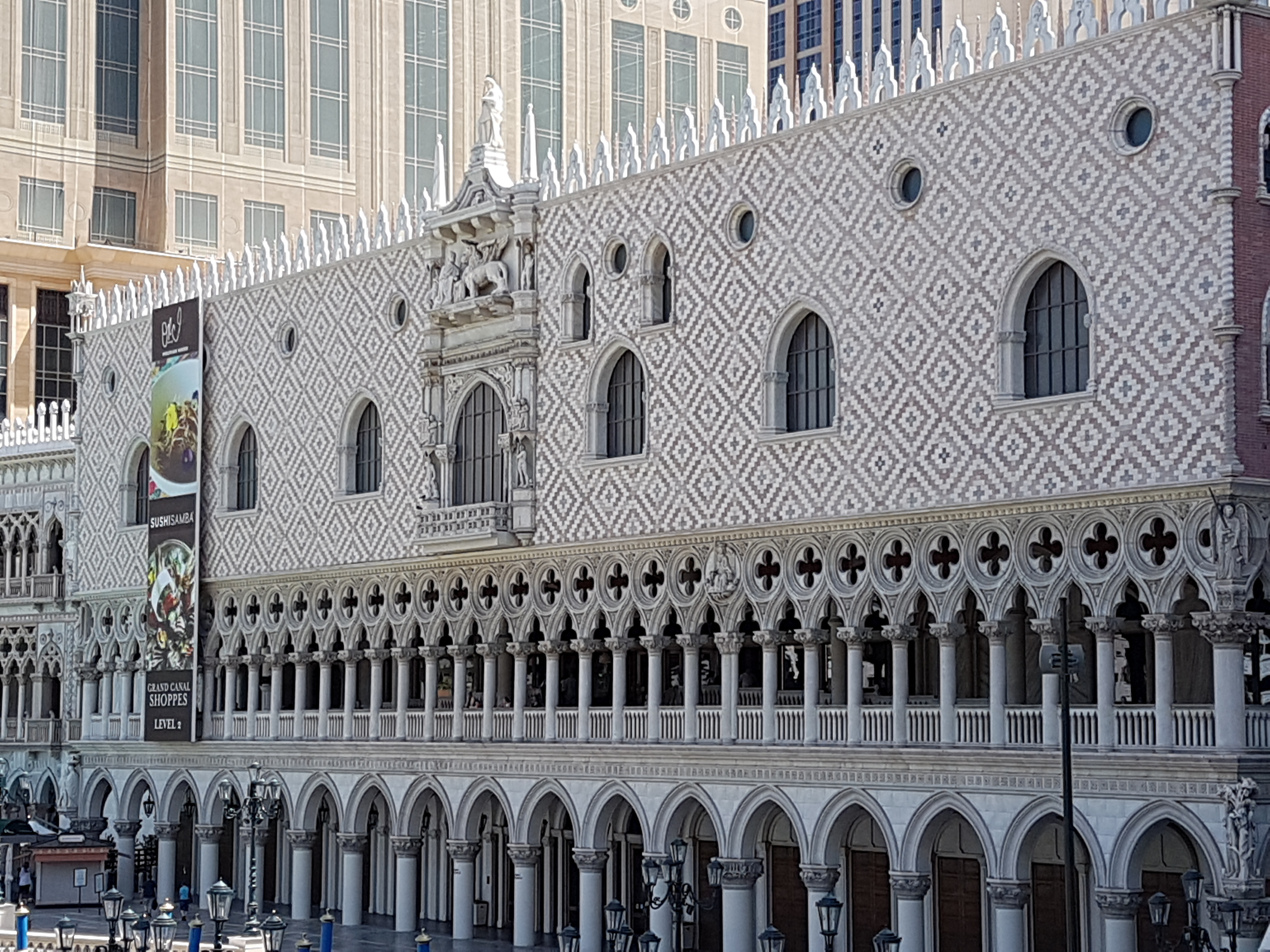
Recreation of the Doge's Palace

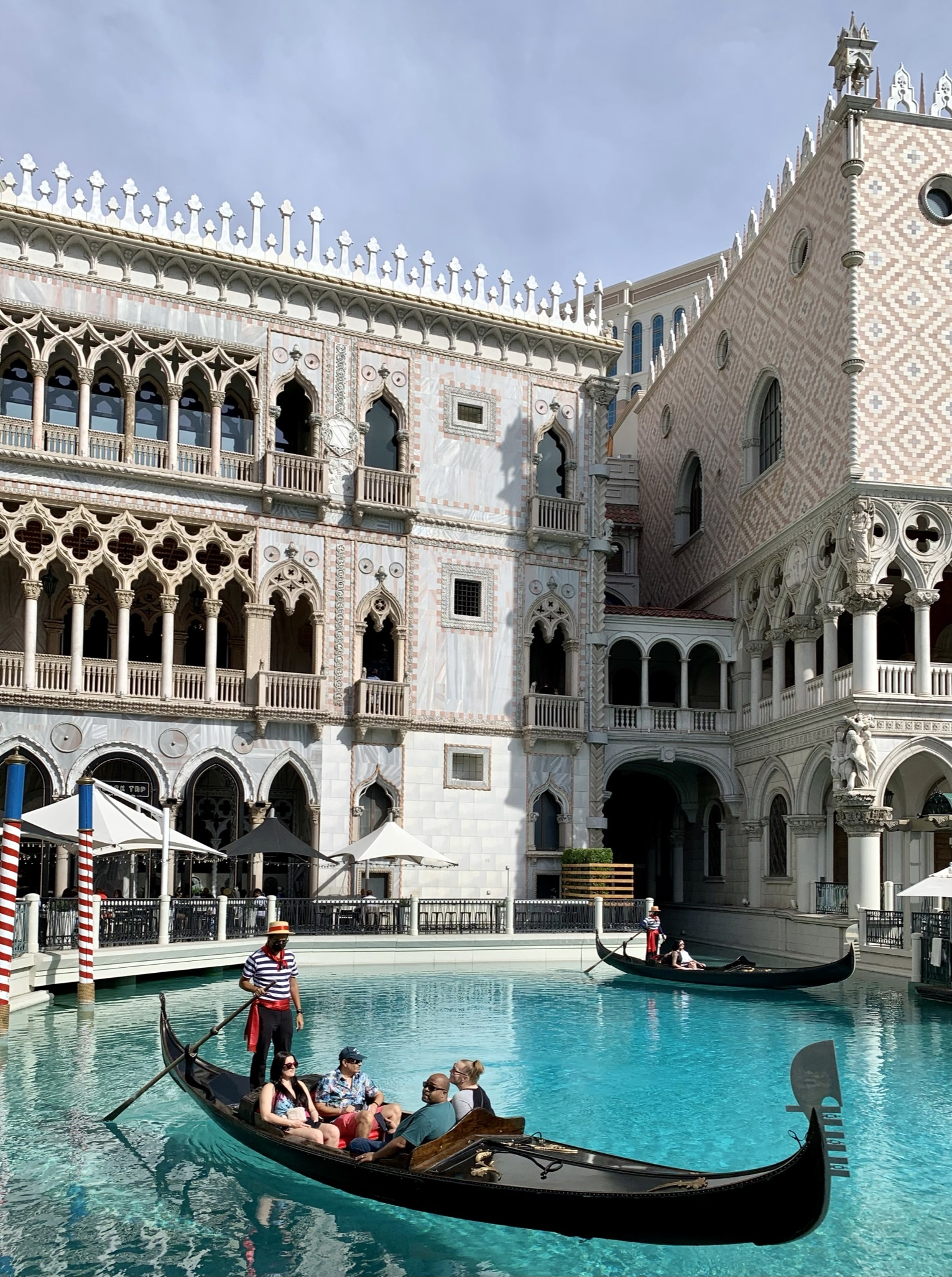
Gondola rides outside the resort

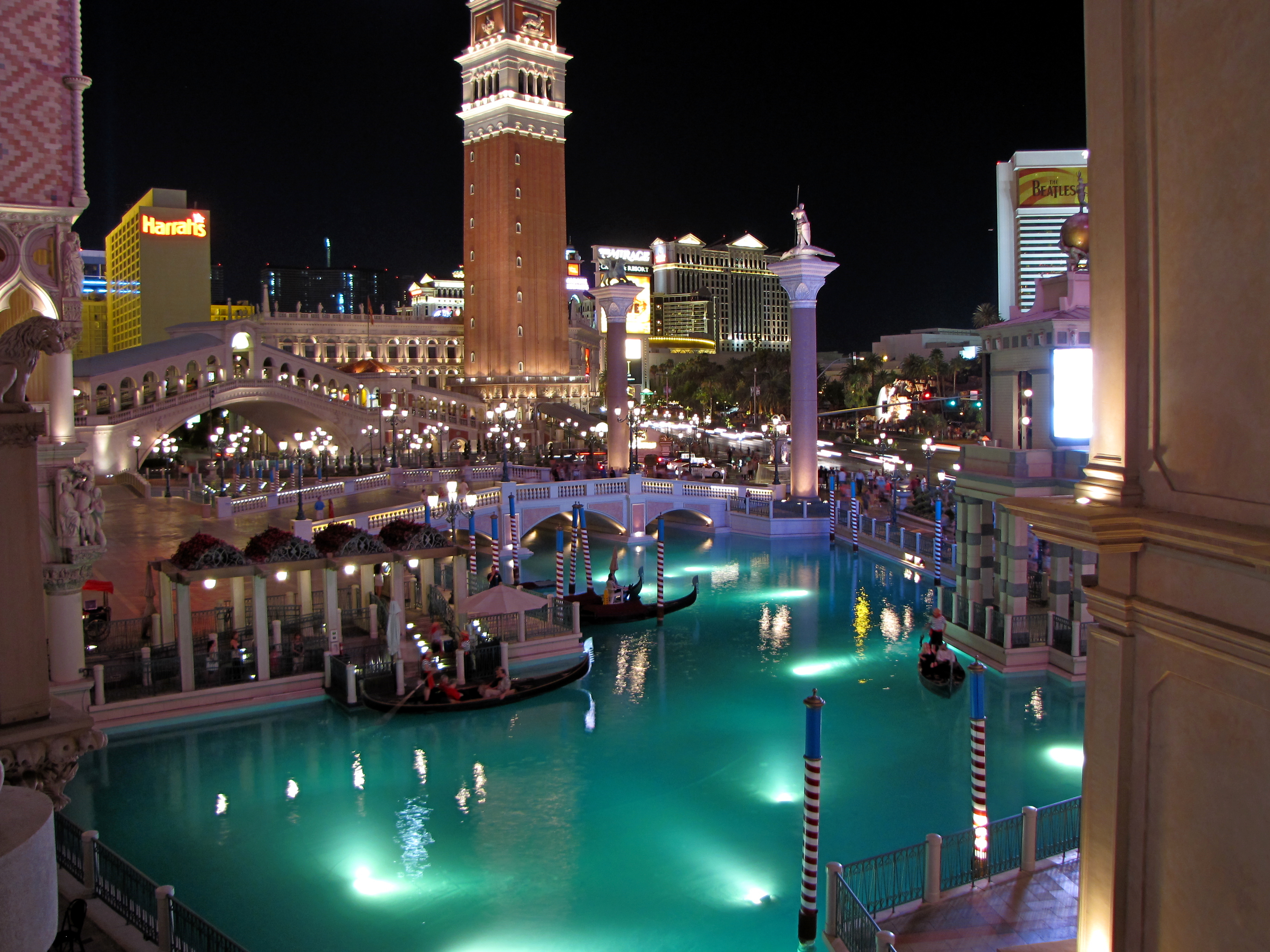
Overlooking the outdoor canal at night

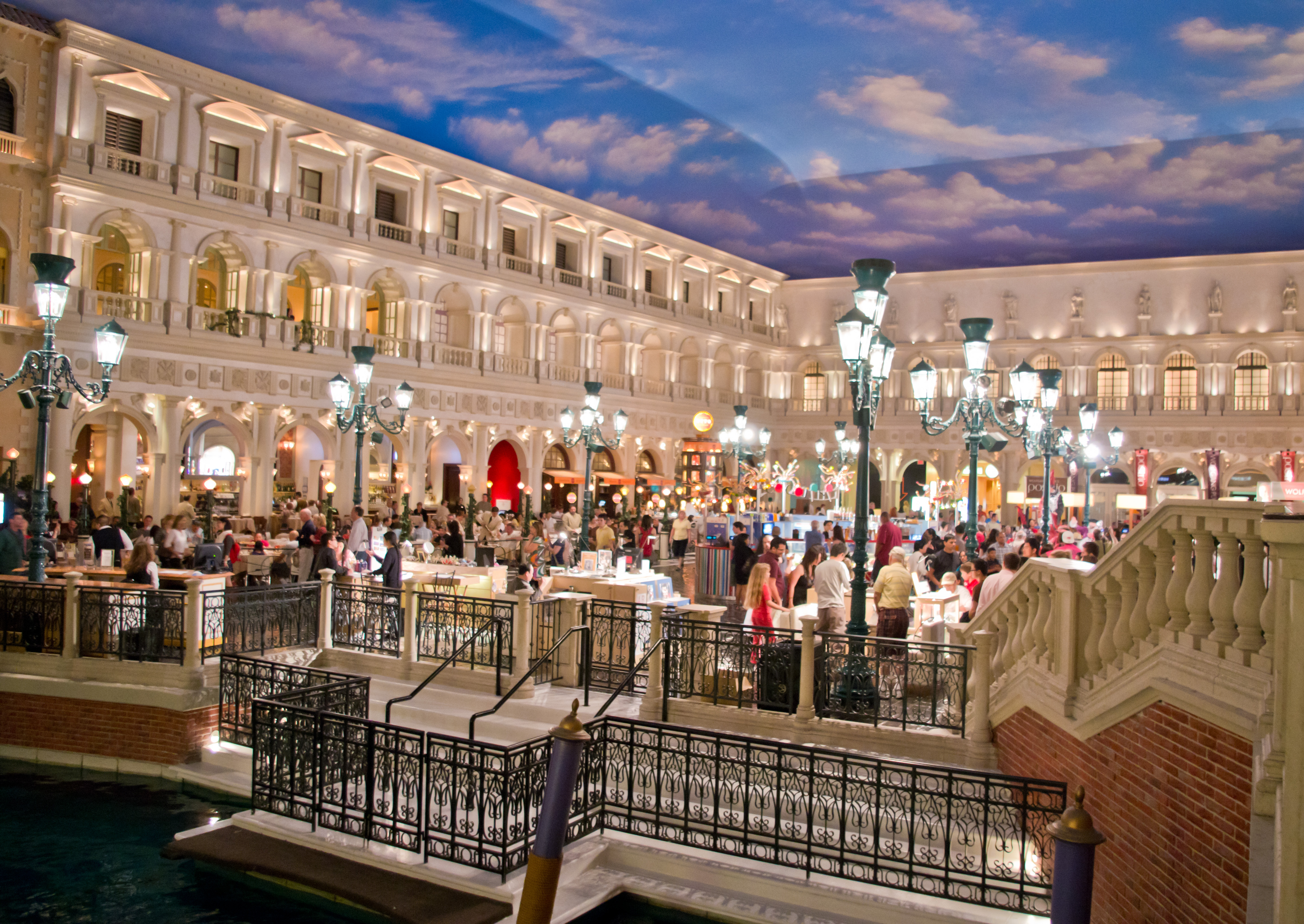
St. Mark's Square inside the Venetian

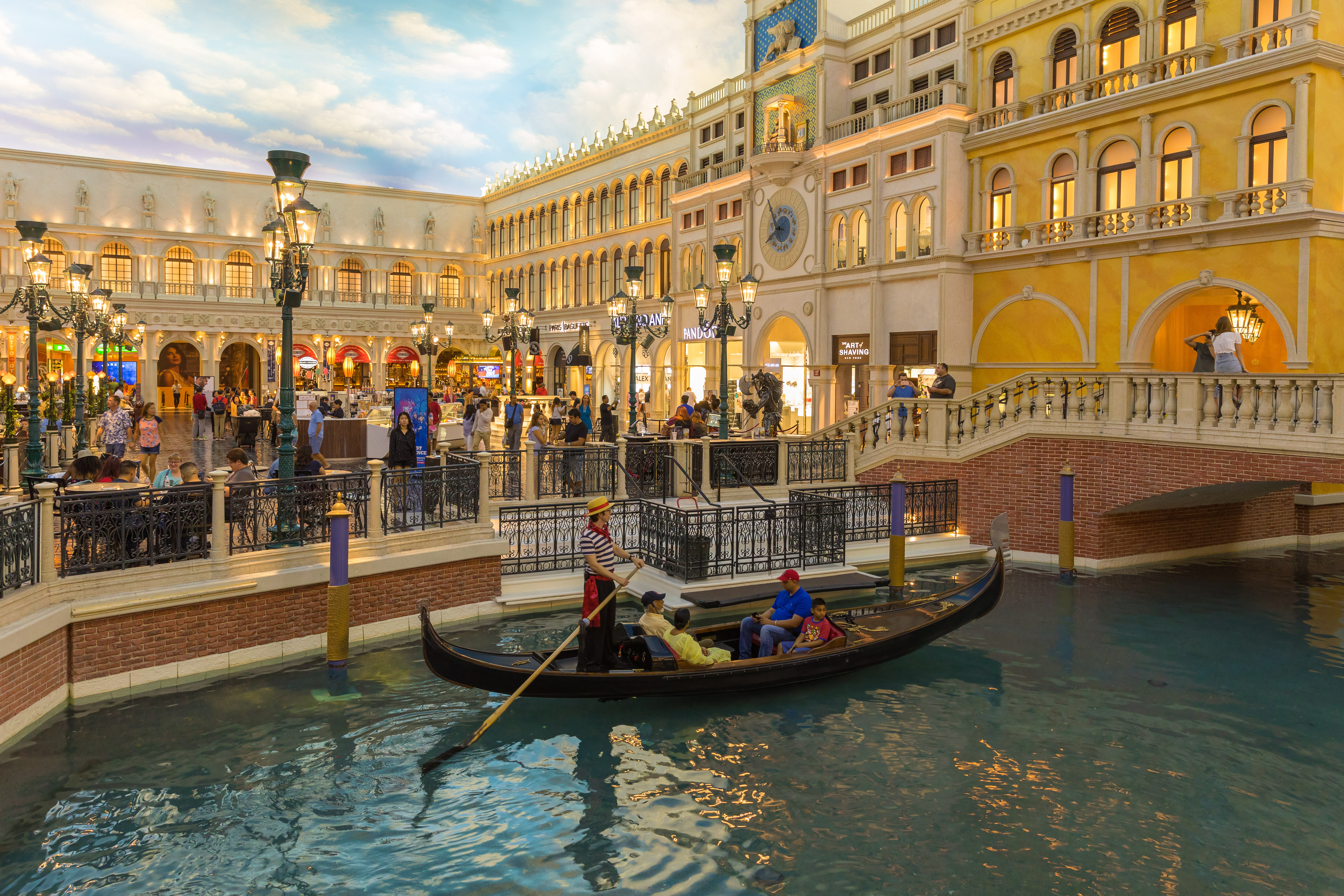
Another view of St. Mark's Square, including its indoor canal

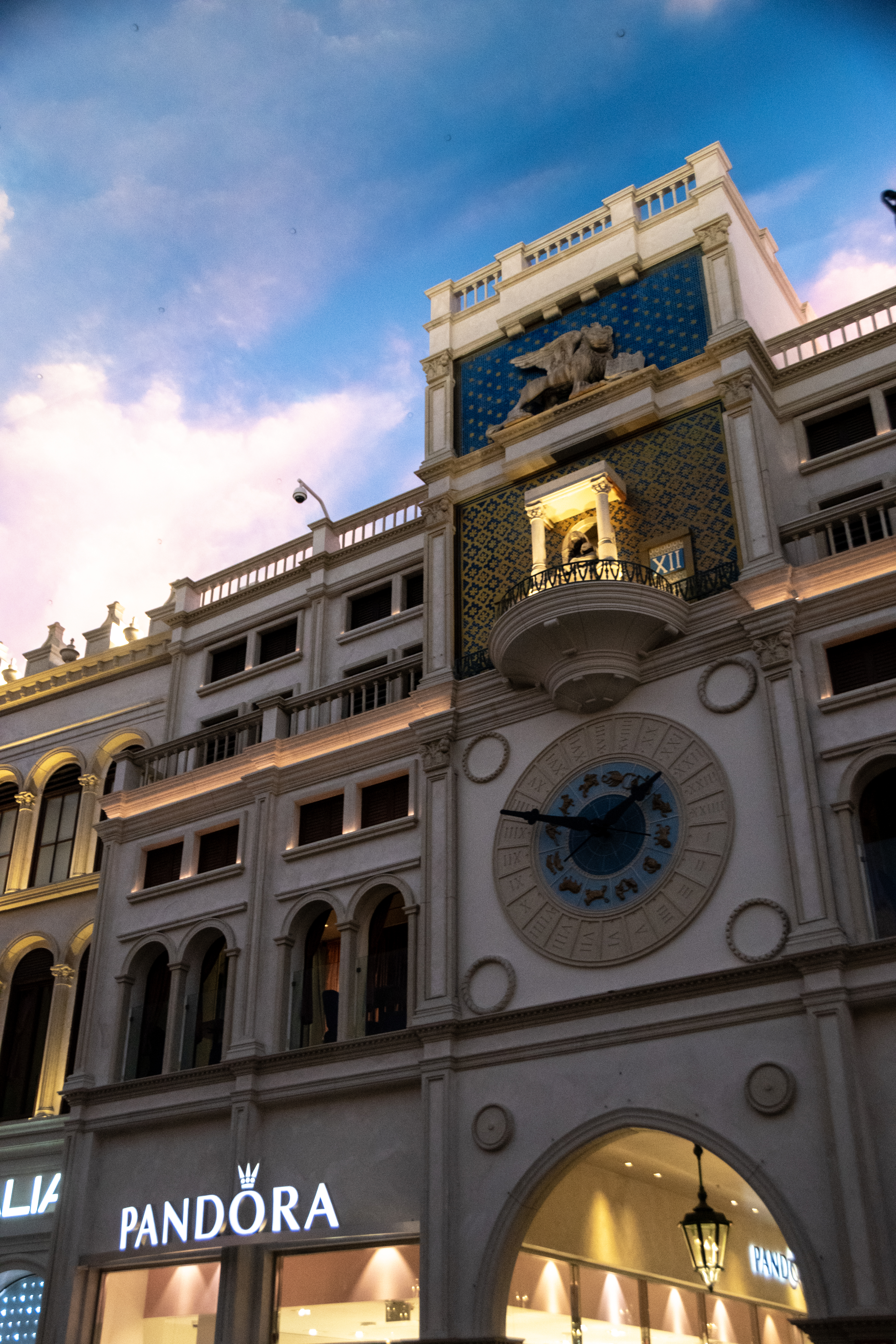
Recreation of St Mark's Clocktower inside the Venetian

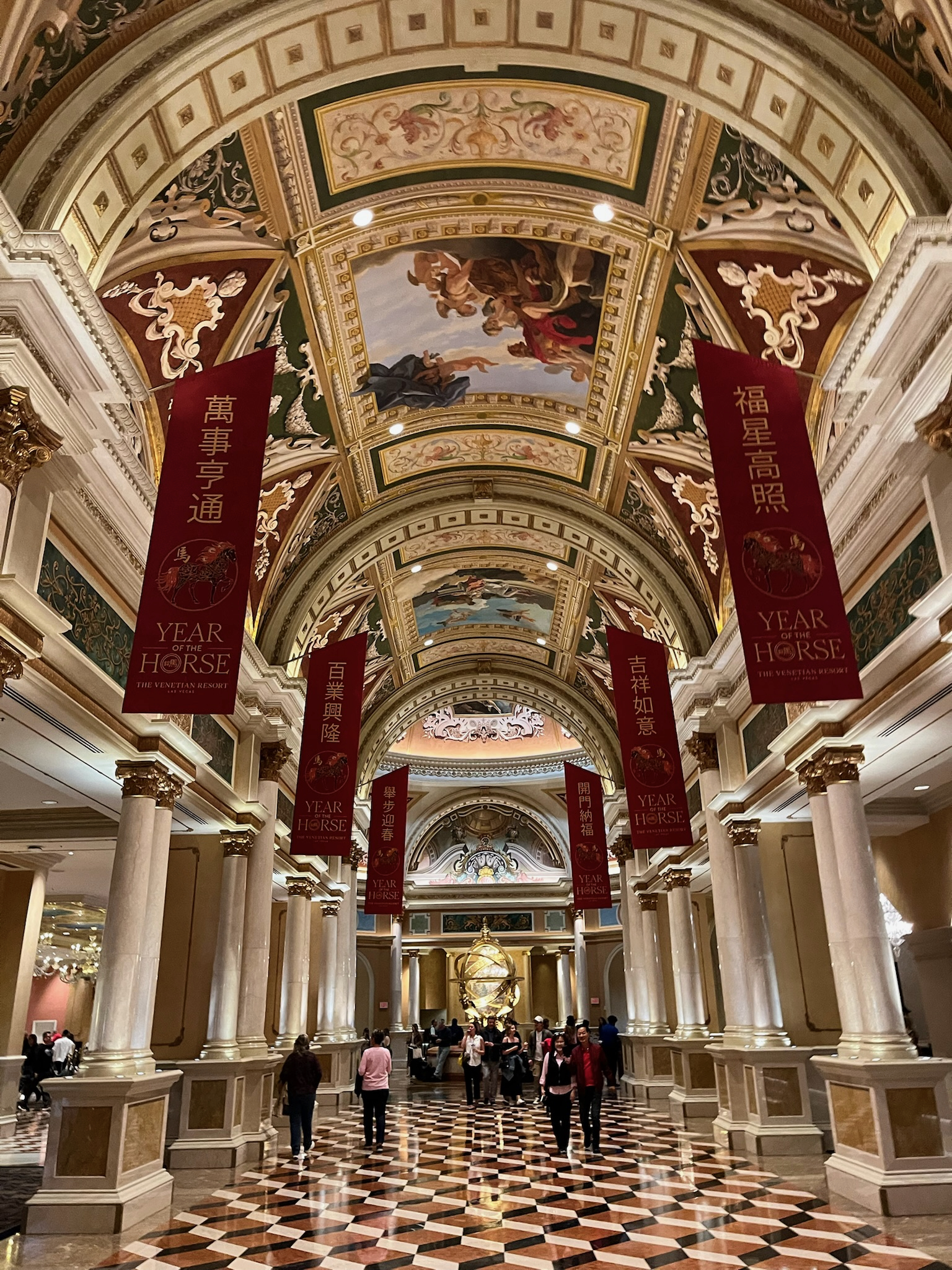
Main hallway to lobby

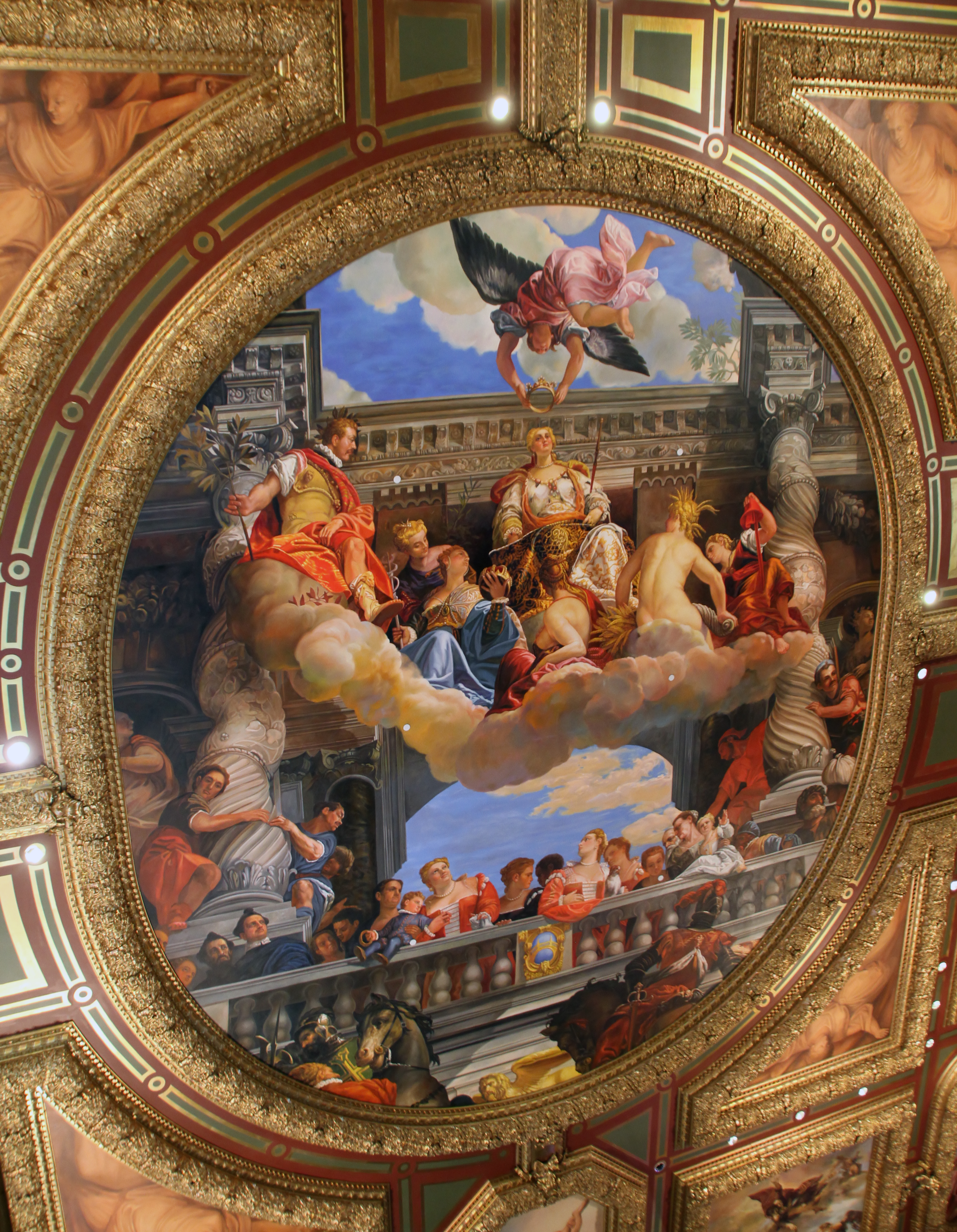
Renaissance paintings on the ceiling of the Grand Canal Shoppes

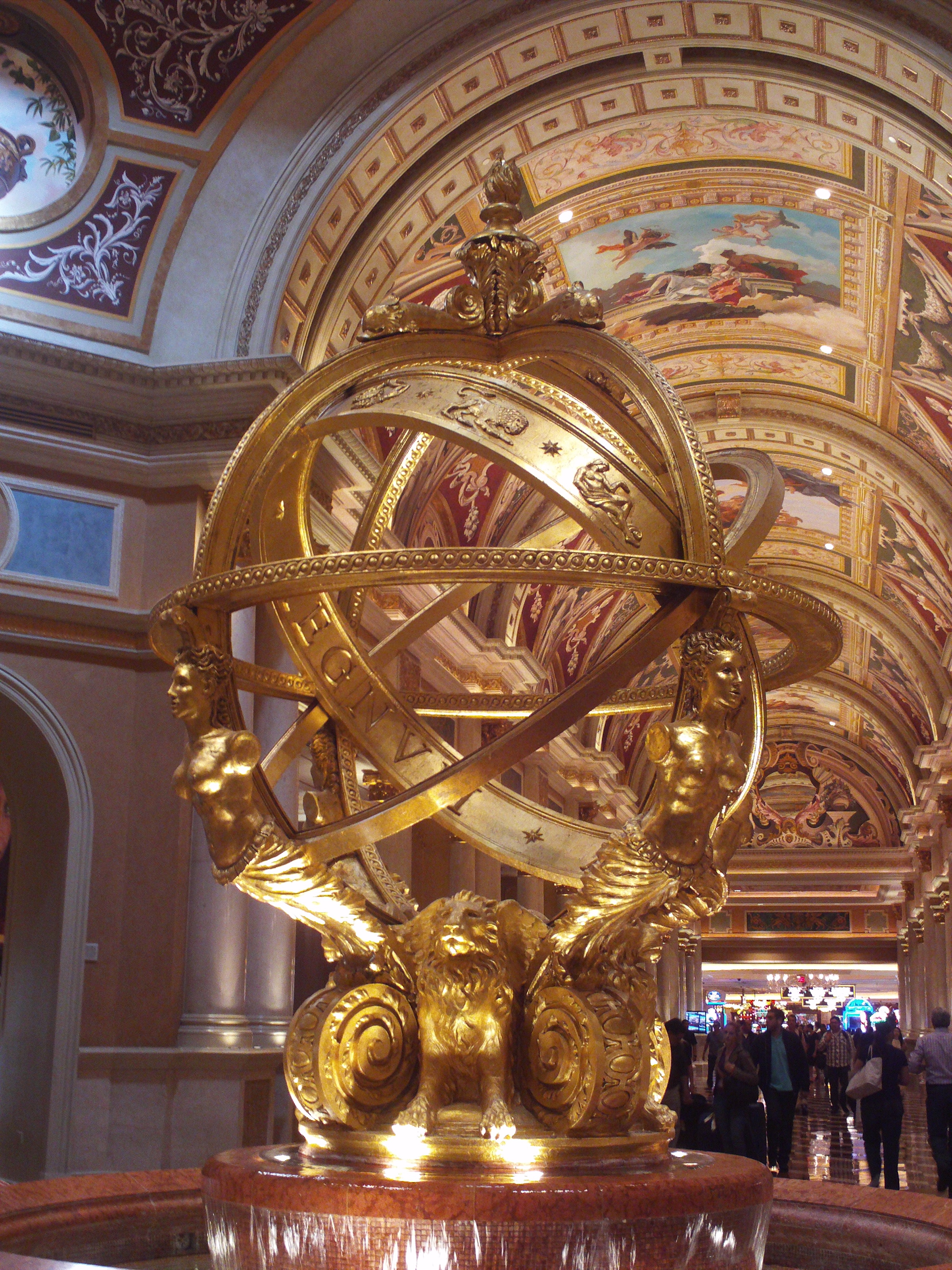
An armillary sphere in the main lobby

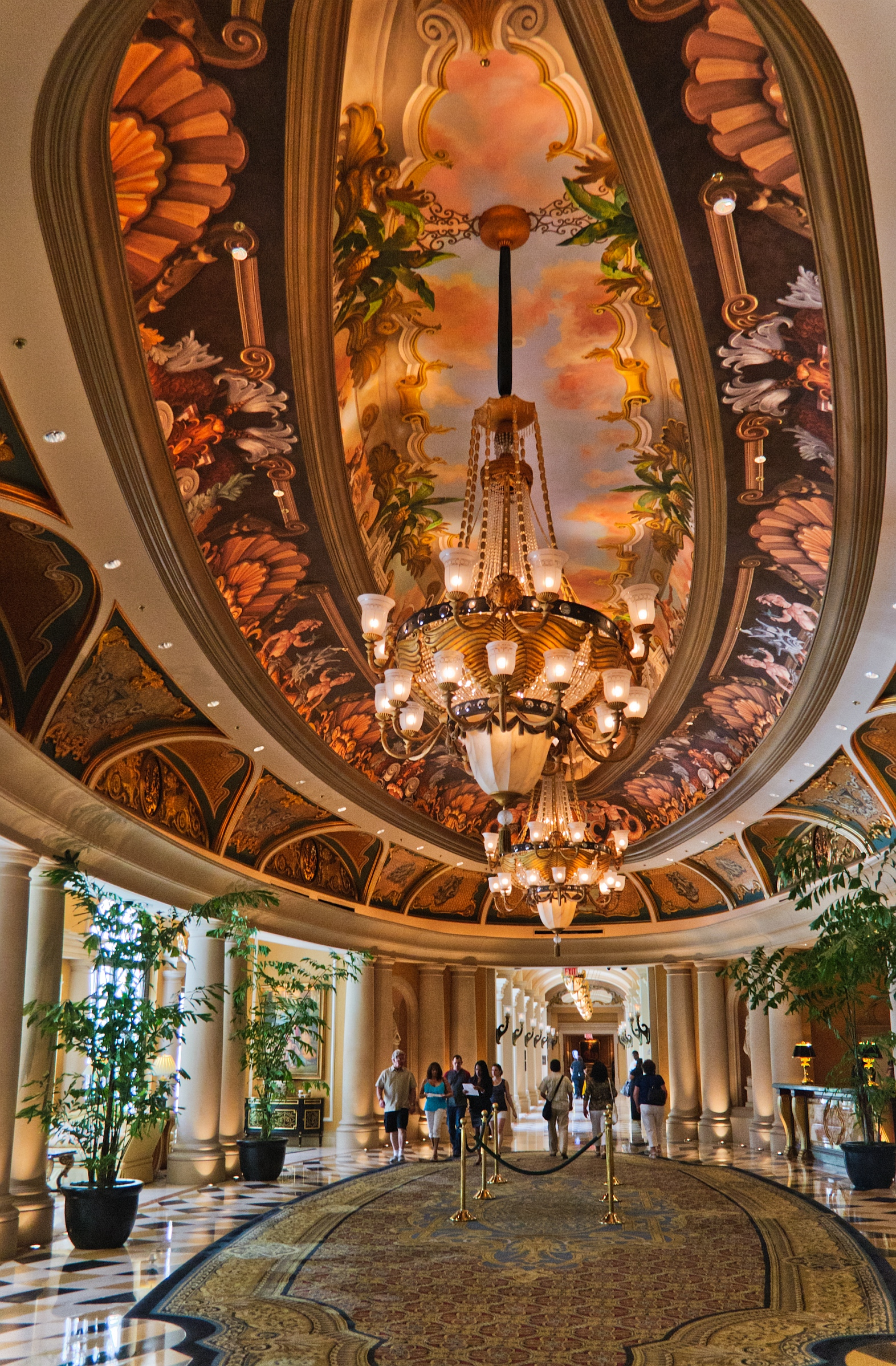
Lobby of the Venezia tower

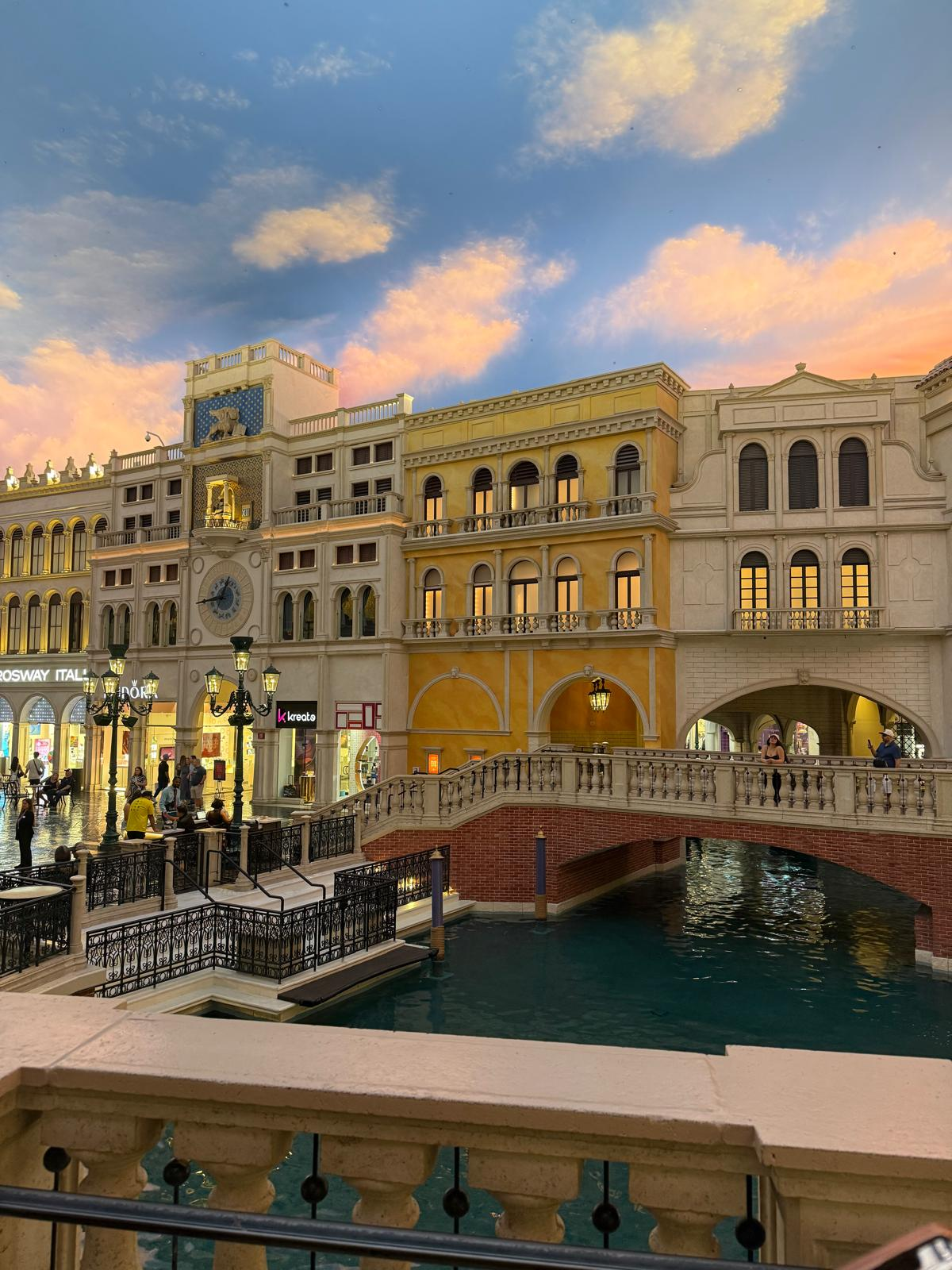
Overlooking the canal on the bridge

== Film and television history ==
Films

- The Venetian's casino, lobby, and exterior were among the filming locations for the 2001 film Rat Race. The hotel rooms were also portrayed in the film, although these scenes were shot on a sound stage in Canada.
- The Venetian hosted the premiere of the 2003 film The League of Extraordinary Gentlemen.
- The Venetian was a prominent filming location for the 2005 film Miss Congeniality 2: Armed and Fabulous.

Television

- In 2000, the cooking program Emeril Live shot several episodes in the Showroom.
- By 2003, the resort had made several appearances on the television series CSI: Crime Scene Investigation.
- A 2005 episode of Megastructures, titled "Ultimate Casino", focuses on the resort's design and construction.
- The U.S. TV series What Not to Wear shot its series finale at The Venetian and Palazzo in 2013, inviting more than 100 past contributors from the show's 10-year run to participate.
- The American game show Wheel of Fortune filmed episodes for its 31st season at the Venetian and Palazzo in 2013.

== See also ==
- List of integrated resorts
