= Guggenheim Hermitage Museum =

Museum in Las Vegas, Nevada

Coordinates: 36°07′17″N 115°10′08″W

Guggenheim Hermitage Museum ("The Jewel Box")
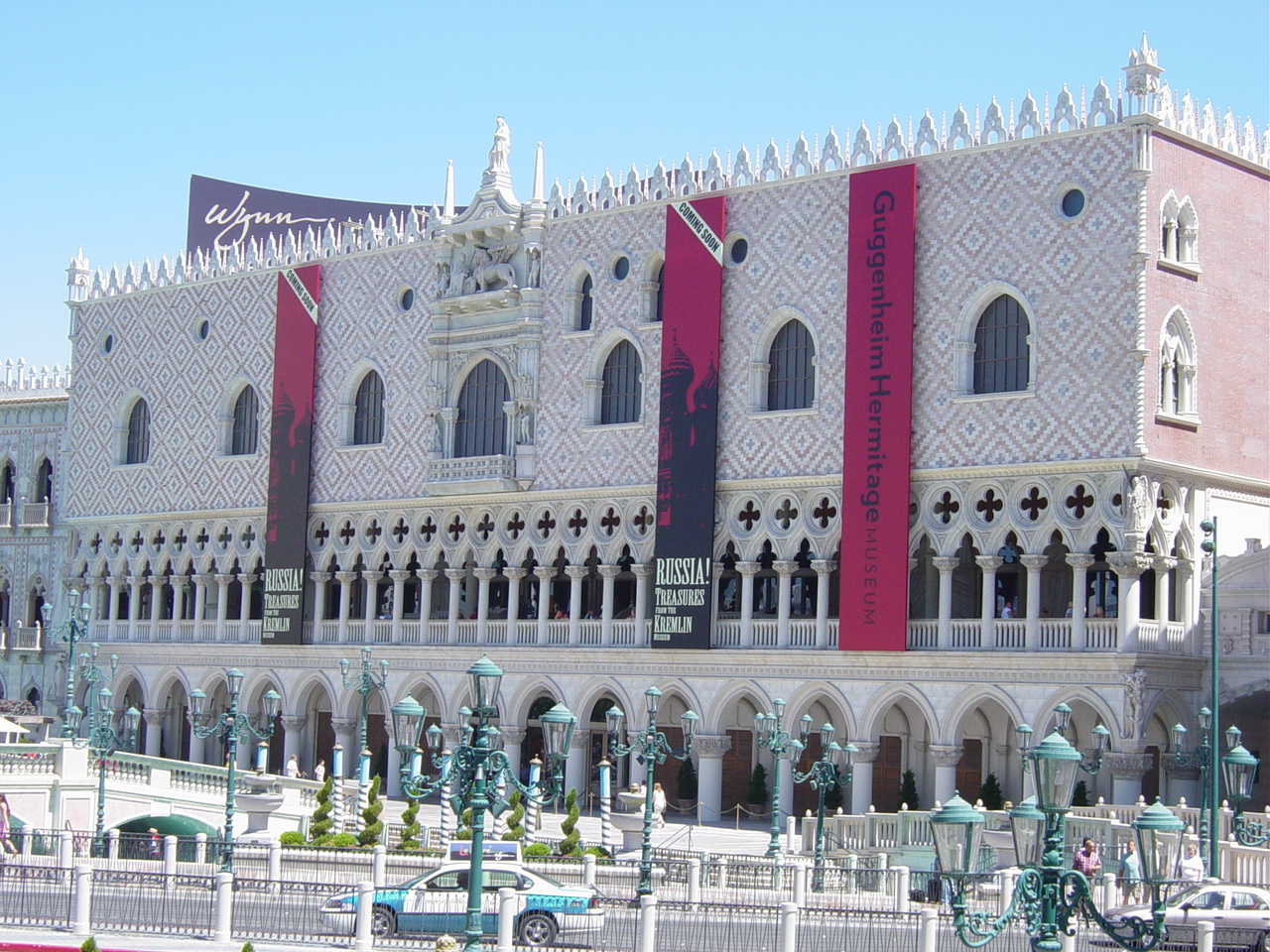
- Venetian exterior with banners advertising the Guggenheim Hermitage Museum, 2005
- Established: October 7, 2001
- Dissolved: May 11, 2008
- Location: The Venetian, Las Vegas, Nevada
- Visitors: 1.1 million
- Owner: Guggenheim Foundation

The Guggenheim Hermitage Museum was a museum owned and originally operated by the Solomon R. Guggenheim Foundation. It was located in The Venetian resort on the Las Vegas Strip, and operated from October 7, 2001, to May 11, 2008.

The Guggenheim Hermitage was the result of a collaboration agreement between the State Hermitage Museum in Saint Petersburg, Russia, and the Solomon R. Guggenheim Foundation, and its exhibitions featured works held by both institutions. The Guggenheim Hermitage, designed by architect Rem Koolhaas, included 7,660 sq ft (712 m^{2}) of space. TSA of Nevada (the Stubbins Associates) served as architect of record. The museum was host to 10 exhibitions during its operation, featuring the work of leading artists such as Vincent van Gogh, Pablo Picasso, and Claude Monet.

The Venetian took over the museum's operations in 2007, before closing it the following year. It attracted 1.1 million visitors throughout its history, with 95 percent of them being tourists. Lack of community support, as well as competition from the Bellagio Gallery of Fine Art, contributed to the closure.

== History ==
In 2000, the Venetian resort in Las Vegas entered negotiations with the Solomon R. Guggenheim Foundation about hosting an art exhibition at the resort. Guggenheim director Thomas Krens had initially rejected the Venetian's proposal, finding it to be "tacky". However, he was convinced of its viability after touring the nearby Bellagio Gallery of Fine Art. A deal was announced later in 2000 which saw Guggenheim partnering with the State Hermitage Museum in Saint Petersburg, Russia.

The Guggenheim Hermitage Museum opened at the Venetian on October 7, 2001, along with a second resort museum, the Guggenheim Las Vegas. The latter operated from October 2001 to January 2003, showcasing The Art of the Motorcycle in a 63,700 sq ft (5,920 m^{2}) building. The 7,660 sq ft (712 m^{2}) Guggenheim Hermitage was designed by architect Rem Koolhaas, who also designed the larger facility. The Guggenheim Hermitage consisted of four gallery rooms, and was nicknamed the "Jewel Box", while the Guggenheim Las Vegas was alternatively known as the "Big Box".

Initial visitation was disappointing, according to Guggenheim. The museum faced competition from the Bellagio art gallery, and also struggled with a lack of community support. Its location on the Las Vegas Strip made it undesirable among locals, with tourists making up approximately 95 percent of attendees. Visitation was also hurt by the economic impact of the September 11 attacks. In 2003, discussions began between the Venetian and the museum to improve on-site advertising. As of 2005, the mall received an average of 200,000 visitors each year. The Venetian took over museum operations in 2007, while Guggenheim and Hermitage continued to loan art to the facility. It eventually closed on May 11, 2008, having received approximately 1.1 million visitors throughout its history, with attendance declining in the final two years. The $15 admission fee was waived during the final month of operation. Its closure left the Bellagio Gallery of Fine Art as the only art facility on the Strip.

=== Exhibitions ===
The Guggenheim Hermitage hosted 10 exhibitions during its operation. Upon opening, the museum showcased 45 notable paintings from both the Guggenheim and Hermitage museums. Among the artists represented were Claude Monet, Franz Marc, Pablo Picasso, Pierre-Auguste Renoir, and Vincent van Gogh.

The Kunsthistorisches Museum in Austria sometimes loaned art to the museum, including a 2004 exhibition, which featured works by Auguste Rodin, Diego Velázquez, Edgar Degas, and Jean-Honoré Fragonard. The Kunsthistorisches was also to loan a portion of its Egyptian collection for a 2005 exhibition, although this deal fell through. A travelling exhibition, The Quest for Immortality: Treasures of Ancient Egypt, was instead signed to take place, with items from the Egyptian Museum, the Luxor Museum, and Deir el-Bahari. Later that year, the Guggenheim Hermitage hosted an exhibition of 16th and 17th century Russian items on loan from the Kremlin Museum.

In 2006, the museum hosted an exhibition featuring the work of Peter Paul Rubens, as well as his pupils Anthony van Dyck and Jacob Jordaens. An exhibition dedicated to photographer Robert Mapplethorpe ran from 2006 to 2007, but saw minimal attendance. It was the museum's first photography exhibit, and also the first to feature the work of a single artist.

== See also ==
- List of Guggenheim Museums
