= Canyon Ranch =

American spa and resort company

Coordinates: 42°20′43.3″N 73°16′43.2″W

Canyon Ranch Resort & Spa
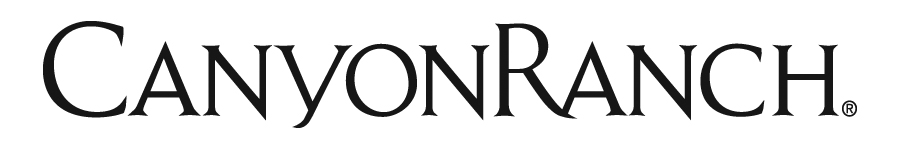
- Company type: Private
- Industry: Hospitality, Resorts, Spas, Culinary
- Founded: 1979
- Founder: Mel Zuckerman, Enid Zuckerman
- Headquarters: Fort Worth, Texas
- Products: destination resorts, hotel services, day spa services, health services, wellness products
- Owner: John C. Goff
- Website: Canyon Ranch

Canyon Ranch operates two destination spas and one retreat property in the United States. The two Canyon Ranch spa resorts are located in Tucson, Arizona, and Lenox, Massachusetts; its retreat property is located in Woodside, California. Canyon Ranch also operates Spa + Fitness locations with primarily day spa facilities. These are located at The Venetian and the Palazzo hotels in Las Vegas, and on cruise lines including Cunard Line, Regent Seven Seas, Oceania, and Celebrity.

== History ==
Canyon Ranch was founded by Mel and Enid Zuckerman and Jerry Cohen in 1979 in Tucson, Arizona. Zuckerman was originally inspired to start a health resort after his own success with improving his health. Following the financial success of the Tucson location, the Lenox resort opened in 1989. Spa + Fitness locations began opening starting in 1999. Additional locations were also located in Miami, Florida, and Kaplankaya, Türkiye. In 2008 Canyon Ranch faced a class action lawsuit and agreed to pay $14.7 million to workers who claimed they were deprived of tips. The plaintiffs consisted of hundreds of waiters, massage therapists, yoga instructors, and housekeepers. The settlement covered employees who worked from April 2004 to October 2007.

In mid 2017, Canyon Ranch was purchased by Goff Capital and the company's global headquarters were consequently moved to Downtown Fort Worth, Texas.

== Resorts ==
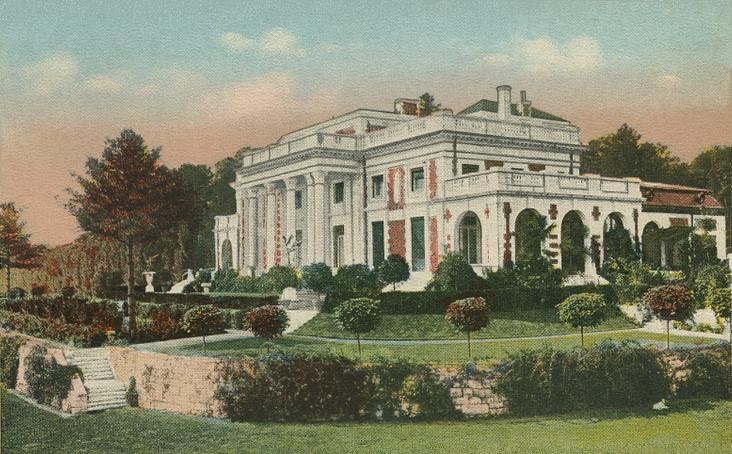
A post card showing Bellefontaine in 1912, when it was still a private home

Canyon Ranch operates two destination resorts and one retreat property within the United States. The resorts have accommodations for short and long-term visits, as well as residential homes and condos. Preventive and diagnostic medical services are offered with full-time physicians, nutritionists, exercise physiologists, behavioral specialists, spiritual wellness experts and other specialists. The Tucson resort is located at the base of the Santa Catalina Mountains in the Sonoran Desert, including Sabino Creek’s riparian habitat. It is the original resort facility and includes a Health & Healing Center and the Life Enhancement Center. The Lenox resort is in the historic Bellefontaine Mansion in Berkshire County in Western Massachusetts. In 2019, Canyon Ranch announced the opening of a new retreat property in Woodside, California.

== Other locations ==
Canyon Ranch Spa + Fitness locations offer spa services, much like a typical day spa, as well as fitness classes and workout facilities. The spa operates at The Palazzo and The Venetian hotels, Canyon Ranch has 134,000 square feet of space, including more than 100 treatment and service spaces. It’s making it one of the largest spas in North America. Canyon Ranch Spas are also on cruise ships like the Cunard, Regent Seven Seas, Oceania and all Millennium & Solstice-class Celebrity vessels.

== Origin of the name Canyon Ranch ==
In an interview with journalist David Leighton, published in the Arizona Daily Star newspaper, on June 24, 2014, Mel Zuckerman tells about the origin of the name Canyon Ranch:

Zuckerman left New Jersey with his family in 1958, and traveled west to find a new home. After 5 weeks of traveling around the western United States, Zuckerman ended up in Tucson, Arizona. He visited Sabino Canyon (a canyon, northeast of Tucson, at the base of the Santa Catalina Mountains), and decided he wanted to live near the natural beauty of this place. Later on when he decided to open a health resort in 1978, along with his wife Enid, he purchased the 42-acre Double U Dude Ranch, near Sabino Canyon. The old ranch buildings were in bad shape but rather than tear them down and potentially damage the energy of the place and scare away the wildlife he decided to rebuild them. When it came time to name the new resort he called it: Canyon Ranch, "a name derived from Sabino Canyon and the Double U Dude Ranch."
