= Yardbird Table & Bar =

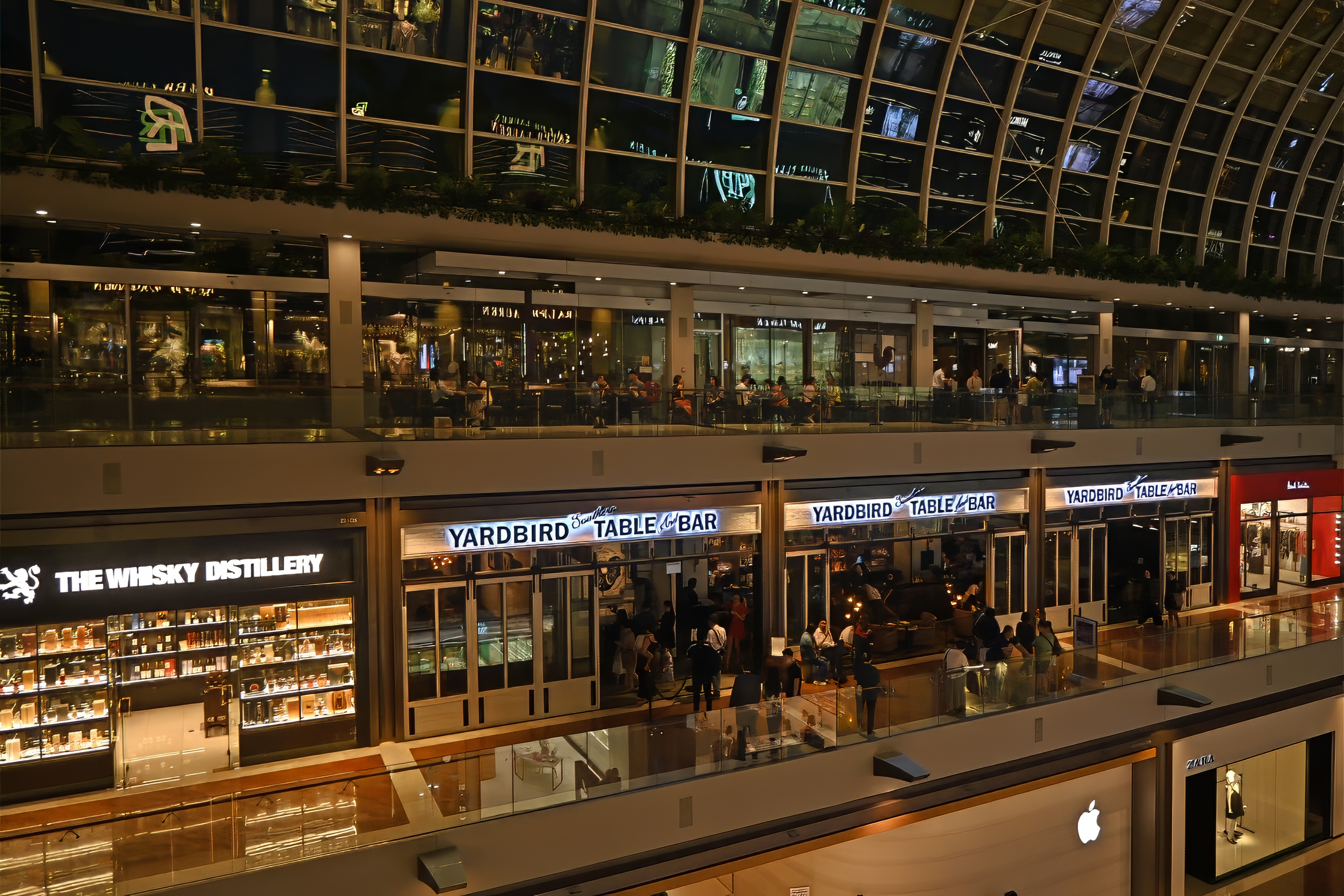
- At the Marina Bay Sands, Singapore

Restaurant information
- Established: 2011
- Owner: Yardbird Group
- Food type: American Cuisine
- Dress code: Casual
- Location: United States
- Reservations: Yes
- Website: www.runchickenrun.com

Yardbird Table & Bar is a group of restaurants in the United States serving Southern food. It is owned and operated by Yardbird Group. and has locations in Los Angeles, Dallas, D.C., Denver, Chicago, Miami, Las Vegas and Singapore.

== History ==
Chef Jeff McInnis, who was a finalist on Top Chef, wanted to start a Southern-style restaurant, serving food similar to what he grew up eating in the Florida Panhandle. He partnered with John Kunkel and Chris Romero, two restaurateurs from Miami, to open the first Yardbird in South Beach in Miami in 2011. It was nominated for a James Beard Award and was named "Best New Restaurant" by Bon Appétit. It was also acknowledged by Southern Living being among the best fried chicken restaurants in the South.

A location in The Venetian opened in 2015 in Las Vegas with Todd Harrington as the executive chef. In 2017, Sandra Palomo became executive chef of the Las Vegas location. A location opened in Singapore in early 2017. In April 2018, a Yardbird opened in Los Angeles, California in the Beverly Center, in 2020, a location opened in Dallas, Texas, and in April 2021, a location opened in Washington, D.C

Chef Kimberly-Ann Ryan from Hell's Kitchen season 16 was the head chef of the Las Vegas location, after winning the title in her season.

In September 2026, Yardbird filed for Chapter 11 bankruptcy after reporting over $25 million in debt and significant operational challenges across its restaurant fleet.

== Design and ambiance ==
The restaurants use the modern farmhouse style. The Miami restaurant, located in a former grocery store, has walls reclaimed from an old barn in North Carolina. It has a chandelier made of Ball glasses.

The Las Vegas location is decorated with pickle jars, video slideshows of famous Southern musicians, and vintage looking light bulbs. The Los Angeles location has industrial features, leather booths, and original artwork.

== Cuisine and beverages ==
=== Food ===
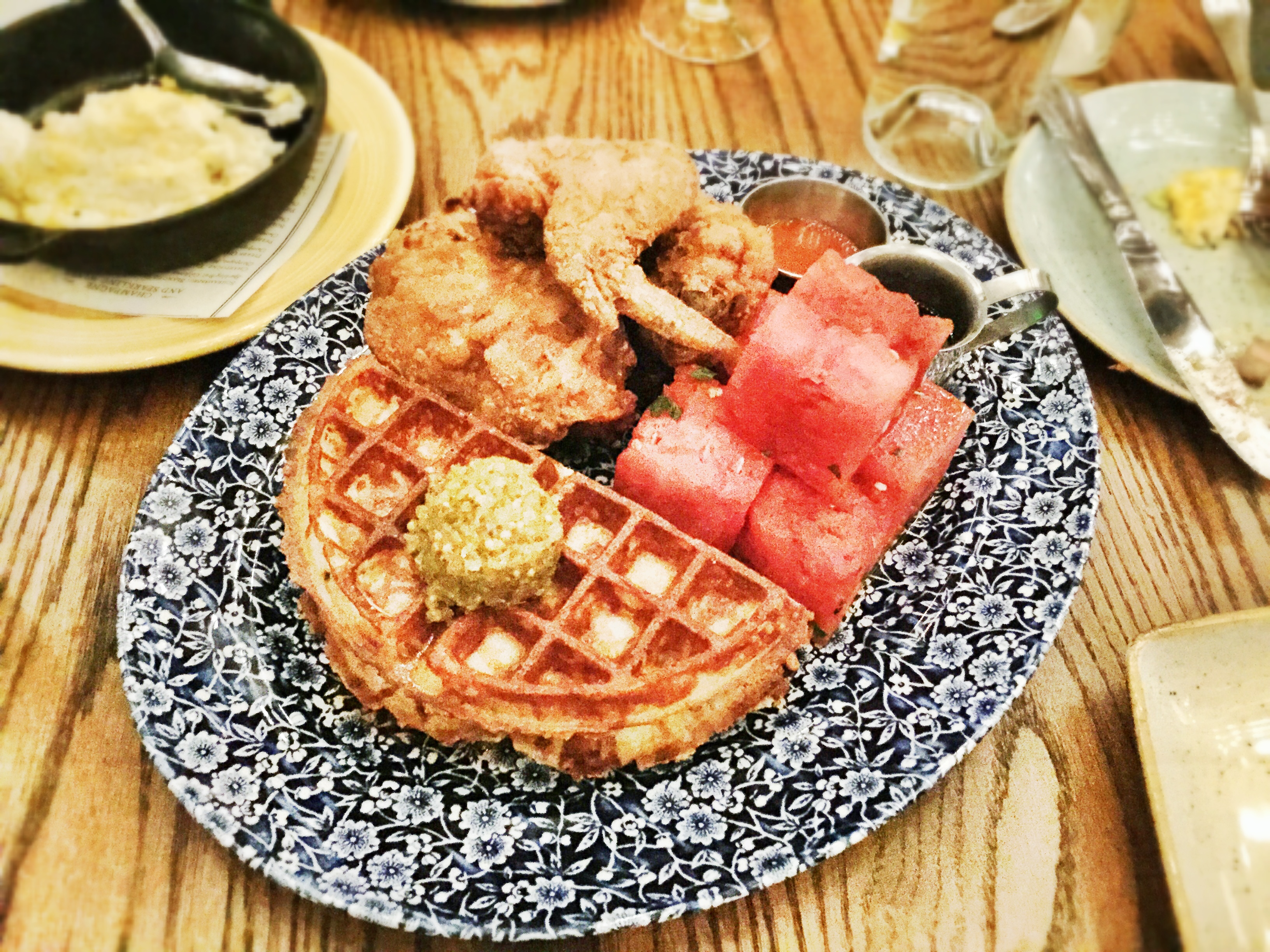
Fried chicken with waffles and watermelon at the Yardbird in Las Vegas

Yardbird serves Southern food, specializing in fried chicken. The fried chicken is made using a family recipe. It's brined for 27 hours, dredged in secret herbs and spices, and fried. It's served with a honey hot sauce. Biscuits are made fresh every half hour. Bacon is made in house, which takes eight hours to make. The restaurant uses locally sourced ingredients, like local alligator, hogs and fish.

The full menu has over 30 items. Appetizers include buttermilk biscuits with honey butter and jam and maple-glazed donuts topped with bacon. Entrees include fried half chicken with macaroni & cheese and pasta, Vermont sharp cheddar cheese waffle with maple syrup, a fried green tomato BLT, and chicken biscuit sandwiches. The Las Vegas location is the only Yardbird to serve a large Niman Ranch pork chop.

The restaurant has an additional brunch menu, which includes strawberry waffles topped with chocolate sauce, strawberries and whipped cream, and avocado toast with prosciutto, a poached egg, and roasted tomatoes.

Desserts include coffee cake with chocolate sauce and coffee ice cream and cinnamon apple pies with vanilla ice cream.

=== Beverages ===
Yardbird Miami has 75 types of bourbon and the Los Angeles location has 100 types of bourbon on the menu and all locations specialize in bourbon cocktails. Cocktails include the Blackberry Bourbon Lemonade made with Wild Turkey, blackberry puree, lemon, cardamon and bitters. The Pork Chop is made with bourbon, cider, citrus juice, thyme, and Dijon mustard. The Los Angeles bar menu includes The Duke, a cocktail that uses a recipe by John Wayne.

== See also ==
- List of restaurants in Dallas
- List of Southern restaurants
