= Valery Yemelyanov =

Soviet antisemite (1929–1999)

- Валерий Емельянов
- Born: 24 May 1929; Moscow, Soviet Union
- Died: 9 May 1999 (aged 69); Moscow, Russia
- Other name: Velemir (Russian: Велемир)
- Citizenship: Soviet, Russian
- Education: Candidate of Economic Sciences (defended his dissertation at the Higher Party School)
- Alma mater: Institute of Oriental Languages, Moscow State University
- Occupations: lecturer at the Maurice Thorez Institute of Foreign Languages, the Higher Party School, and other universities; one of the founders of Russian neo-paganism
- Political party: CPSU, Pamyat (member), World Anti-Zionist and Anti-Masonic Front (VASAMF) "Pamyat" (founder)
- Movement: Slavic neopaganism, antisemitism

Valery Nikolayevich Yemelyanov (Russian: Валерий Николаевич Емельянов; 24 May 1929 – 9 May 1999) was a Soviet-Russian Arabist and public figure, teacher of Arabic and Hebrew, and candidate of economic sciences.

Yemelyanov was a member of the anti-Zionist circle, which was part of the Russian nationalist movement in the USSR, known as the "Russian Party". He was one of the founders of Russian neo-paganism, a representative of the "first wave" of the Russian neo-pagan movement, the creator of the pseudo-historical concept of an ancient civilization of "Aryo-Veneti", and an author of antisemitic ideas. He was the founder and chairman of World Anti-Zionist and Anti-Masonic Front "Pamyat" (the neo-pagan wing of the far-right Pamyat society) and author of the books Dezionization and Jewish Nazism and the Asiatic Mode of Production. He was one of the most prominent self-proclaimed anti-Zionists in the Soviet Union.

== Life ==
Yemelyanov graduated from the Institute of Oriental Languages at the Moscow State University. He worked as an adviser to Nikita Khrushchev on Middle Eastern affairs.

In 1963, Yemelyanov was prosecuted for plagiarism in his PhD dissertation. After Khrushchev's resignation in 1967, he defended his dissertation at the Higher Party School of the Central Committee of the Communist Party of the Soviet Union, after which he taught political economy, Arabic, and Hebrew at the Maurice Thorez Institute of Foreign Languages, the Higher Party School, and several other universities, and worked as a translator.

His strong knowledge of Arabic and work opportunities allowed Yemelyanov to establish extensive connections in the Arab world, including some of the highest-ranking officials. He developed his concept of Zionism from these sources. As a lecturer at the Moscow City Party Committee in the early 1970s, Yemelyanov called for the "exposure" of the "Judeo-Masonic conspiracy."

Yemelyanov consulted with and was friends with members of the anti-Zionist circle and the Russian nationalist movement known as the "Russian Party." During the 1970s, Yemelyanov closely associated with other authors developing the neo-pagan "Aryan" myth, Valery Skurlatov and A. Ivanov (Skuratov). For a long time, Yemelyanov managed to maintain his roles as both an official publicist and a samizdat author; in this capacity, he was a unique example in the Russian nationalist movement. His official publications were consistent with the general thrust of Soviet anti-Zionist propaganda.

Yemelyanov was the author of one of the first manifestos of Russian neo-paganism, the anonymous letter Critical Notes of a Russian Man on the Patriotic Magazine Veche, published in 1973. After the publication of the notes, the magazine was liquidated in 1974, and its editor, V. Osipov, was arrested. This letter marked Yemelyanov's first samizdat publication.

In the 1970s, Yemelyanov wrote the book Dezionization, first published in Arabic in 1979 in Syria in the newspaper Al-Baʽath, under the orders of Syrian President Hafez al-Assad. At the same time, photocopies of this book, purportedly published by the Palestine Liberation Organization in Paris, was distributed in Moscow. Among the illustrations for this book were reproductions of paintings by Konstantin Vasilyev depicting Russian heroes fighting evil forces, and, most notably, the painting "Ilya Muromets Defeats the Christian Plague," which has since become popular among neo-pagans.

A voluminous and eclectic work, the central idea of Dezionization is that the "true" history of humanity is a hidden struggle between pagans and "degenerate" Jewish Zionists. It also briefly recounts the contents of the Book of Veles and the foundations of neo-paganism. The book presents a version of the Judeo-Masonic conspiracy theory. According to Yemelyanov, the conspiracy of Zionists and Masons was hatched by King Solomon to seize power over the entire world by the year 2000; Solomon's Temple was supposedly used for devil worship and human sacrifice. The book was translated and published in Israel and several European countries as an example of modern Soviet antisemitism.

In addition describing the alleged history, structure, and operating methods of the "Ziono-Masonic concern," Dezionization included the charter of the "World Anti-Zionist and Anti-Masonic Front" (Russian: Всемирный антисионистский и антимасонский фронт, romanized: Vsemirny antisionistsky i antimasonsky front, VASAMF). The section "Principles and Objectives of the Front" envisioned its formation as a "world organization for defense against Jewish Nazism-Zionism" and the liberation of all peoples of the world, and most importantly the Slavs, from "occupation."

According to A. Ivanov (Skuratov), Yevgeny Yevseyev acted as an expert on Dezionization. Despite the fact that he was one of the intellectual leaders of Russian nationalists, he assessed the book as anti-Soviet and anti-Semitic. Later on, the theoretical differences between these two main ideologues of anti-Zionism had begun to worsen, reflected in a series of samizdat publications written by themselves and their associates.

A recording of Yemelyanov's lecture at the All-Union Knowledge Society, circulated in samizdat, contained the idea that Jews are a professional tribe of criminals, as well as a number of oral mythologies circulating among Russian nationalists, including criticism of Lilya Brik's "Jewish influence" on Vladimir Mayakovsky and Andrei Tarkovsky's film Andrei Rublev.

The dissemination of the ideas Yemelyanov outlined in Dezionization and in lectures at the Knowledge Society in the early 1970s sparked an international protest, lodged by US Senator Jacob Javits to Soviet Ambassador to the United States Anatoly Dobrynin in 1973, after which Yemelyanov's lectures were ended.

Semyon Reznik wrote that in 1975, Yemelyanov succeeded in having Masonic symbols removed from an exhibition dedicated to the Decembrists. Sergei Semanov, a member of the "Russian Party," noted in his diary that in 1977, Yemelyanov sent a letter to the CPSU Central Committee protesting the presence of Masonic symbols on a commemorative ruble, which consisted of three intersecting satellite orbits. Yemelyanov spoke with Mikhail Zimyanin, the Secretary for Ideology, which resulted in the Politburo of the Communist Party of the Soviet Union withdrawing the coins from circulation and sending them to be melted.

In 1977, Yemelyanov sent a memorandum to the Central Committee of the CPSU, claiming that all Soviet Jews were "Zionist agents." Thus, among other things, he demanded the introduction of a mandatory course in "scientific anti-Zionism and anti-Masonry" in schools, universities, and the army, the creation of a scientific institute for the study of Zionism and Masonry under the Central Committee of the CPSU. In the memorandum, he "exposed" the "international Judeo-Masonic pyramid." He proposed the creation of a "World Anti-Zionist and Anti-Masonic Front" similar to the anti-fascist popular front of the 1930s and 1940s, since, in his opinion, all goyim of the world were threatened by the global Zionist domination that he predicted to come by the year 2000.

In 1977–1978, Yemelyanov participated in the activities of the anti-Zionist circle, on the basis of which its participants planned to establish the Pamyat World Anti-Zionist and Anti-Masonic Front. The circle was led by Yevgeny Yevseyev, nephew of the Secretary of the Central Committee of the CPSU, Boris Ponomarev. Later, in 1979–1980, following the circle's example, a Book Lovers' Society was founded under the Ministry of Aviation Industry, forming the basis of what in 1982 became the Pamyat Society.

Semyon Reznik believes that Yemelyanov was the author of an anti-Semitic article in the magazine Moskva, published in 1979 under the pseudonym I. Bestuzhev. This article asserted that Judaism preaches hatred of non-Jews and instructs to kill the best of them.

Yemelyanov began accusing a wide range of individuals of "Zionism," including the ruling elite, headed by General Secretary of the Central Committee of the CPSU Leonid Brezhnev. In early 1980, he attempted to distribute copies of Dezionization among members of the Politburo of the CPSU Central Committee and its secretariat. Following an investigation by the Party Control Commission, Yemelyanov was expelled from the CPSU and suspended from his post; the formal grounds for this were violation of party discipline by publishing the book abroad. From the CPSU Central Committee's perspective, independent publication of the book, especially by a party member, was unacceptable. On 26 March 1980, he refused to name the people who helped him publish the book at a Party Control Commission meeting. The Shorter Jewish Encyclopedia attributes his expulsion with the fact that Yemelyanov called Leonid Brezhnev a "Zionist." His expulsion from the party meant the end of his political and public career.

On 10 April 1980, Yemelyanov was arrested on charges of murdering and dismembering his wife with an axe. He was convicted, declared insane, diagnosed with schizophrenia, and placed in the Leningrad Special Psychiatric Hospital for six years. According to a later statement by a court observer, Yemelyanov's motive for dismembering his wife's body and burning it at a construction site was suspicions of her collaboration with Zionists.

After his release from the psychiatric hospital in 1986, Yemelyanov joined Dmitri Vasilyev's Pamyat Society and was briefly considered one of its leaders. The most influential literature in the society were Yemelyanov's Dezionization and A. M. Ivanov's (Skuratov's) The Christian Plague. Yemelyanov parted ways with Vasilyev on ideological grounds: Vasilyev believed that the Zionists were destroying Christianity in Russia, while Yemelyanov believed that Christianity was imposed on Russia by the Zionists.

In late 1987, Yemelyanov founded the Pamyat World Anti-Zionist and Anti-Masonic Front.

Since late 1989, Yemelyanov had been an open adherent of neo-paganism. At that time, together with Alexander Belov's Slavic Gorits Wrestling Club, he co-founded the Moscow Slavic Pagan Community, the first neo-pagan society in Moscow, and adopted the neo-pagan name Velemir. In 1990, Belov expelled Yemelyanov and his supporters, including Alexey Dobrovolsky (Dobroslav), from the community for political radicalism.

In 1991, Yemelyanov became one of the founders of the Slavic Council. In 1992, he declared himself "Chairman of the World Russian Government," but in the early 1990s, his organization's membership consisted of only a few dozen people who ran their own military-sports club in Moscow. It is alleged that their activities received financing from Arab countries.

In the second half of the 1990s, Yemelyanov advocated the restoration of the monarchy in Russia under the "Stalin dynasty" and proposed Stalin's grandson, retired colonel Yevgeny Dzhugashvili, as ruler. In the 1990s, Yemelyanov taught at the Armored Forces Academy.

Toward the end of his life, Yemelyanov faded from the political scene. In 1997, along with a small number of followers, he joined A. M. Aratov's small Russian National Liberation Movement and became editor-in-chief of the newspaper Russkaya Pravda.

== Views and thought ==
In the 1970s, a significant part of the activities of Yemelyanov and other members of the "Russian Party" was the promotion of a neo-pagan and racist worldview. These authors arrived at neo-paganism through the following theoretical construct: since everything emanating from Jews is by definition negative, it follows that Christianity was also created by Jews to enslave other peoples. As a counterweight to Christianity, the authors proposed a return to the "original" religion of the ancient Slavs or Proto-Slavs, whom they considered part of the "ancient Aryans." Yemelyanov combined into a general theory the "Aryan" ideas of the Book of Veles, the anti-Christian pathos of A. Ivanov (Skuratov), and the visual works of Konstantin Vasilyev.

In his letter Critical Notes of a Russian Man on the Patriotic Magazine Veche (1973), Yemelyanov accused the magazine of pandering to "international Zionism," which is "worse than the fascist plague." He characterized the magazine as a "Zionist anteroom." In his opinion, for this publication to be "truly" Russian, it should "publish materials about the worthlessness of the scientific works of Zionist pseudoscientists... ask prosecutors questions about how Zionists buy dachas and cars." He called Christianity and Islam "subsidiaries of Judaism," created to subjugate humanity to the Jews. He asserted that "Christianity in general and Orthodoxy in particular... were created precisely to erase everything distinctive and national, to transform all who profess them into rootless cosmopolitans." He called on Russians to return to the ancient faith in Slavic pagan gods and "to end Orthodoxy as the antechamber of Jewish slavery." He declared the Bolsheviks to be the only force capable of saving the world from the "Zionist conspiracy."

In Dezionization, Yemelyanov wrote about an alleged great Russian pre-Christian civilization that had created a rich written language and culture. Like other neo-pagan authors, such as Valery Skurlatov and Vladimir Shcherbakov, he extensively referenced the Book of Veles, which he claimed preserved remnants of the true Russian worldview, constituting the "soul of the people." He referred to the ancient Aryans who came to India as "Aryo-Veneti," who allegedly brought to Hindustan "our ideology, preserved at the foundations of Hinduism and yoga." The "Aryo-Veneti" also dominated the Eastern Mediterranean for some time; according to Yemleyanov, the name Palestine originates from them, which means "Scorched Camp" (Russian: Опалённый стан, romanized: Opalyonny stan). Seeking to portray the Aryo-Veneti, rather than the Semites, as the creators of the alphabet, he also included the Phoenicians as members of the Aryo-Veneti.

According to Yemelyanov, the "Slavo-Russes," also of the Aryo-Veneti, populated all of continental Europe and Scandinavia, right up to the lands of the Germans. "The only indigenous peoples of Europe are the Veneti and the Baltic Aryans," while the Celts and Germans supposedly came from the depths of Asia. The "Veneti" constituted "the backbone of the Aryan linguistic substratum" and were the main guardians of the "pan-Aryan" ideology. The purity of language and ideology was preserved only "in the vast expanses from Novgorod to the Black Sea," where the idea of the "trinity of three triune trinities" persisted longest: Prav-Yav-Nav, Svarog-Perun-Svetovid, Dusha-Plot-Mosh (Soul-Flesh-Power). A golden age reigned in this land, when "the concept of evil did not exist." The Russes lived in harmony with nature, knew no blind submission to God, and had neither sanctuaries nor priests. Female yogis, supposedly characteristic of the "Aryans," acted as bearers of "occult power."

Yemelyanov portrayed Jews as savages who migrated to "Aryan" Palestine and appropriated the "Aryan" cultural heritage. The Jewish language itself allegedly developed under strong "Aryan" influence. The "wild Jews" managed to conquer the lands of the "glorious Aryans" not through military force and valor, but thanks to the criminal actions of Egyptian and Mesopotamian priests who feared the "great people of Ros or Rus" who lived in Asia Minor and Palestine:

To eliminate this threat, the ancient priests had long cultivated and nurtured a stable, hybrid criminal genotype, created over many centuries by interbreeding ancient professional criminal underworld dynasties of the black, yellow, and white races.

Later, by 1994, Yemelyanov's idea crystallized into the formulation: "Jews are professional ancient criminals who have formed a specific race." According to Yemelyanov, the world is doomed to an eternal struggle between two almost cosmic forces — patriotic nationalists and "Talmudic Zionists."

According to Yemelyanov, since the emergence of the Jews, the core of world history has been the mortal struggle between Zionists (Jews) and Masons against the rest of humanity, led by Aryans, in a struggle for world domination. The plan for this struggle was allegedly devised by King Solomon. The concept of Solomon's sinister role dates back to a pamphlet by the Russian mystic Sergei Nilus, one of the first publishers of The Protocols of the Elders of Zion. Yemelyanov claimed that Judaism demands human sacrifice. His goal was to expose the plans of the "Zionist-Masonic concern," which allegedly plotted to create a world state by the year 2000. Christianity, according to him, serves as a powerful weapon in the hands of Zionism, created by the Jews specifically for the purpose of enslaving other peoples. To Yemelyanov, Jesus was simultaneously a "common Jewish racist" and a Mason, while Prince Vladimir was imbued with Jewish blood. Only the Aryan world, led by Russia, could resist Zionism.

The Pamyat VASAMF, led by Yemelyanov, declared that it spoke on behalf of "the majority of the indigenous population of every country in the world" and set its primary goal as the struggle against the threat of domination by "Jewish Nazism (Zionism)." The Front's ultimate goal was to establish an "anti-Zionist and anti-Masonic dictatorship" in all countries of the world that would not encroach on the features of the existing state systems. The Front declared the beginning of a "racial struggle," presenting it as a struggle for democracy, designed to save the world from the horrors "already experienced by the peoples of Russia and Palestine." The Front showed particular sympathy for the Palestinians, calling them brothers in suffering from the "genocide perpetrated by Jewish Nazis" and declaring its support for the Palestine Liberation Organization. He declared Islam a staunch ally in this struggle.

== Legacy ==
Yemelyanov is held in high esteem by a number of Russian neo-pagans, who consider him a "founding father." Many of his ideas have become widespread in Slavic neo-paganism and the Russian far-right; the most prominent of these are the theft of great Aryan wisdom by Jews, the folk etymology of the word "Palestine", and Jews as hybrids of criminals of different races. The latter has been adopted by such authors as Alexander Barkashov, Yuri Petukhov, Yu. M. Ivanov, and Vladimir Istarkhov. A number of ideas from Dezionization were directly borrowed by the writer Yuri Sergeyev. The 1973 letter contained the core components of the ideology of the politicized wing of Russian neo-paganism: antisemitism, the idea of a "Zionist conspiracy," the rejection of Christianity as a "Jewish religion," and a call to revive the worldview of Slavo-Russian paganism.

Under Yemelyanov's influence, a number of marker terms entered into fantastic and parascientific literature about the ancient Slavs, functioning as a Dog whistle (politics) - their mention indicates to those in the know that a specific ideology is being discussed, but allows one to avoid accusations of antisemitism or racism. These include: "Scorched Camp" (Palestine), "Siyan Mountain" (Mount Zion), "Rusa-Salem" (Jerusalem), steppe-dwelling ancestors who traveled throughout Eurasia in ancient times, and Khazaria as a parasitic state (the Khazar myth).

Yemelyanov is the author of one of the main Russian neo-pagan myths: that of the Judeo-Khazar origins of Prince Vladimir, which led him to introduce Christianity, an instrument for the enslavement of Aryans by the Jews, as described in Dezionization. Historian and religious scholar Roman Shizhensky characterizes this idea as one of the most "odious" neo-pagan historical myths; he wrote that this myth is based solely on an attempt to correlate and identify the names "Malk," "Malka," and "Dobrynya" with concepts (not even anthroponyms) that Yemelyanov derived from the Hebrew language: "dabran" - a good orator, a talker; "malik" - king, ruler. Shizhensky notes that it contradicts scientific works on the subject and the body of historical sources, particularly those attesting to the widespread use of the anthroponym Malk in Rus' and its Slavic origins.

Based on the decision of the Meshchansky District Court of Moscow dated 3 December 2008, Dezionization was added to the Russian Federal List of Extremist Materials under number 970.

== Publications ==
- Zionism in the Service of Anti-Communism. Summary of a lecture by V. N. Emelyanov from the series "Contemporary Anti-Communism," delivered in the Small Hall of the lecture center of the All-Union Society "Znanie" on 7 February 1973. — Munich: SDS. — Vol. 28. AS No. 1558.
- Critical Notes of a Russian Person on the Patriotic Journal "Veche" // Novy Zhurnal. — 1975. — No. 118.
- Dezionization: International Zionism; first edition published in the 1970s in Arabic; in 1979 circulated in Russian via samizdat (indicated as "Paris").
  - Fragments of Dezionization were published in 1984 in issue no. 4 of the New York right-wing radical journal Russkoye Samosoznanie (publisher N. Tetenov).
  - "Autobiography and Desionization" (in Russian). Archived from the original on 2010-01-04. — Moscow: Russian Truth, 2001. — Print run: 5,000 copies.
  - Dezionization. — Moscow: Russian Truth, 2005.
- The Real "Pamyat" Is Alive // Russian Truth. — 1994. — No. 3. — p. 3.

== Sources ==
- Klejn, Leo (2004). Воскрешение Перуна: К реконструкции восточнославянского язычества [The Resurrection of Perun: Toward the Reconstruction of East Slavic Paganism] (in Russian). Saint Petersburg: Evraziya. ISBN 9785444804223.
- Laqueur, Walter (1994). Чёрная сотня. Происхождение русского фашизма [Black Hundreds: The Rise of the Extreme Right in Russia] (in Russian). Мoscow: Tekst. ISBN 5751600010.
- Mitrokhin, Nikolai [in Russian] (2003). Русская партия: Движение русских националистов в СССР, 1953—1985 годы [Russian Party: the movement of Russian nationalists in the USSR. 1953-1985] (in Russian). Moscow: Novoye literaturnoye obozreniye. ISBN 9785867932190.
- ——— (2013). "«Антисионисты» и неоязычники в русском националистическом движении СССР 1960-х — 1970-х гг" ["Anti-Zionists" and neo-pagans in the Russian nationalist movement of the USSR in the 1960s and 1970s]. Форум Новейшей Восточноевропейской Истории И Культуры — Русское Издание (in Russian) (2): 214–232.
- Nudelman, Rafail [in Russian] (1979). "Современный советский антисемитизм. Формы и содержание" [Modern Soviet anti-Semitism. Forms and content]. Antisemitism in the Soviet Union. Its Roots and Consequences (in Russian). Jerusalem: Library "Aliya".
- Reznik, Semyon (1991). Красное и коричневое, Книга о советском нацизме [Red and Brown, Book about Soviet Nazism] (in Russian). Washington: Vyzov.
- Shizhensky, Roman (2009). "Неоязыческий миф о князе Владимире" [Neo-pagan myth about Prince Vladimir]. Bulletin of the Buryat State University. Philosophy, Sociology, Political Science, Cultural Studies (in Russian) (6): 250–256.
- Schnirelmann, Victor (2015). Арийский миф в современном мире [Aryan myth in the modern world] (in Russian). Novoye literaturnoye obozreniye. ISBN 9785444804223.
- Taguieff, Pierre-André (2011). Протоколы сионских мудрецов. Фальшивка и ее использование [The Protocols of the Elders of Zion: the Forgery and Its Uses] (in Russian). Translated by Abramov, G. A. Moscow: Gesharim / Bridging Cultures. p. 584.
- Vishnevskaya, Yuliya [in Russian] (1988). Rozanova, Maria (ed.). "Православные, гевалт!" [Orthodox, gewalt!]. Sintaksis (in Russian).
