= Slavic Native Faith in Russia =

Modern Pagan religion in Russia

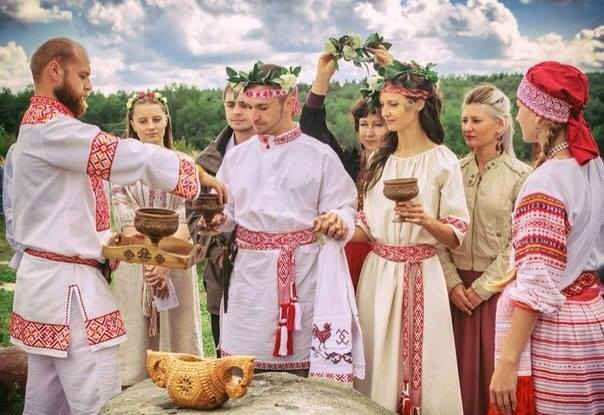
- Wedding ceremony of the Union of Slavic Native Belief Communities

Founder
- Valery Yemelyanov (Velemir), Alexey Dobrovolsky (Dobroslav), and others

Regions with significant populations
- Russia: 757,000 (2012)
- Poland: 7,000–10,000
- Ukraine: 5,000–10,000

Religions
- Ethnic neo-paganism

Languages
- Russian

Slavic Native Faith or Slavic Neopaganism in Russia (variously called Rodnovery, Orthodoxy, Slavianism and Vedism in the country) is widespread, according to some estimates from research organisations which put the number of Russian Rodnovers in the millions. The Rodnover population generally has a high education and many of its exponents are intellectuals, many of whom are politically engaged both in the right and the left wings of the political spectrum. Particular movements that have arisen within Russian Rodnovery include various doctrinal frameworks such as Anastasianism, Authentism, Bazhovism, Ivanovism, Kandybaism, Levashovism, Peterburgian Vedism, Slavic-Hill Rodnovery, Vseyasvetnaya Gramota, the Way of Great Perfection, the Way of Troyan, and Ynglism, as well as various attempts to construct specific ethnic Rodnoveries, such as Krivich Rodnovery, Meryan Rodnovery, Viatich Rodnovery. Rodnovery in Russia is also influenced by, and in turn influences, movements that have their roots in Russian cosmism and identify themselves as belonging to the same Vedic culture, such as Roerichism and Blagovery (Russian Zoroastrianism).

== History ==
=== Russian Diaspora and the USSR ===
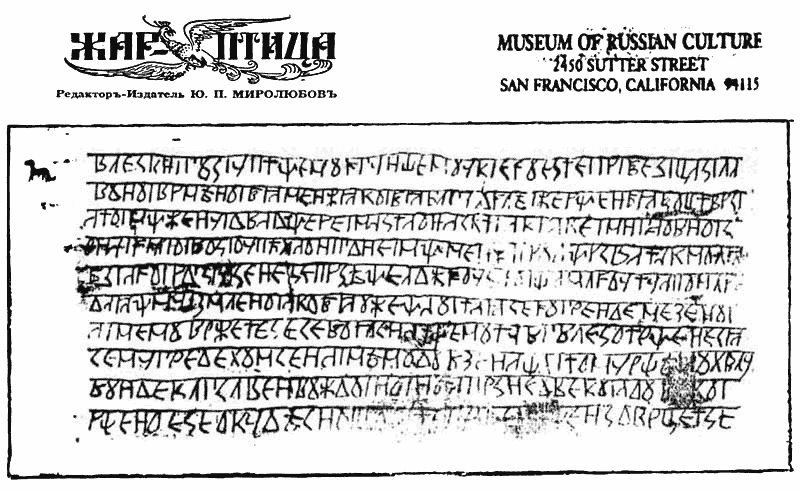
An image claimed to be a photograph of a tablet of the Book of Veles

In the middle of the 20th century, authors appeared among the white émigrés, writing of neo-paganism. Among them were Alexander Kurenkov (pseudonym Al. Kur, 1891–1971) and writer Yuri Mirolyubov (1892–1970), who first published in 1953–1957 in the Firebird magazine (San Francisco). Mirolyubov also owns a number of pseudo-historical works, including the book "Rig Veda and Paganism", Kurenkov - the book "From the True History of Our Ancestors". Close to them was also the biologist Sergei Lesnoy (real name S. Ya. Paramonov, 1894–1967), author of the books The History of the Russians in an Unperverted Form (1953–1960) and The Book of Vlesova, a Pagan Chronicle of Pre-Olegov Rus': The history of the find, text and commentary (1966). There is no information about the existence of any neo-pagan movement around them.

One of the translators of the Book of Veles into Russian was Boris Rebinder, an engineer from the city of Royat in France, born in Russia, also fascinated by the "prehistory of the Slavs". Rebinder sent Mirolyubov's works to Viktor Bezverkhy, one of the first ideologues of Russian neo-paganism, and to other Russian supporters of neo-paganism. Rebinder sent materials on the Book of Veles to the Department of Old Russian Literature of the Institute of Russian Literature of the USSR Academy of Sciences. In 1993, his book was published in Ukrainian, containing the apologetics of the Book of Veles.

In the USSR, the "Book of Veles" became widely known thanks to the program article "Vityazi" (1971) by member of the "Russian Party" poet Igor Kobzev, who was fond of Russian paganism and contrasted it with "forcibly implanted" Christianity, which allegedly caused irreparable harm to the original Russian culture. The article was directed against the distortions of the Russian language and Russian history by some ill-wishers, while in fact, according to Kobzev, "the Russian people, like the Russian language, have infinitely deep roots that go back to the foggiest distances of millennia." the author also called for the fight against Zionism. Kobzev demanded the publication of the texts of the Book of Veles (1977) and published poetic translations of some of its passages (1982).

The beginning of the controversy in the USSR around the Book of Veles was started by an article by neo-pagan authors Valery Skurlatov and N. Nikolaev (1976), published in the popular weekly newspaper Nedelya. These authors argued that the work is a "mysterious chronicle" that allows one to take a fresh look at the time of the emergence of Slavic writing, reconsider scientific ideas about ethnogenesis, the level of social development, and the mythology of the Slavs. Also in 1976, the Nedelya newspaper published a selection of rave reviews about the Book of Veles, including accusations against persons who allegedly seek to "dismiss" readers and writers from an outstanding work by silence.

Modern Russian neo-paganism took shape in the second half of the 1970s and is associated with the activities of antisemitic supporters of the Moscow Arabist Valery Yemelyanov (neopagan name - Velemir) and the former dissident and neo-Nazi activist Alexey Dobrovolsky (neopagan name - Dobroslav).

In 1957, under the influence of the revolution in Hungary (1956), Dobrovolsky created the Russian National Socialist Party and was later imprisoned. Since 1964, he collaborated with the National Alliance of Russian Solidarists. On December 5, 1965, he organized a demonstration on Pushkin Square. In 1968, he was involved in the Trial of the Four. In 1969, Dobrovolsky bought a library and immersed himself in history, esotericism, and parapsychology.

In 1989, together with Valery Yemelyanov, Dobrovolsky took part in the creation of the "Moscow Slavic Pagan Community", which was headed by Alexander Belov (Selidor), and approved the eight-ray "Kolovrat" as a symbol of "resurgent paganism." The community was founded at Slavic-Goritsa Wrestling Club. In 1990, Belov expelled Yemelyanov, Dobrovolsky, and their supporters from the community for political radicalism.

Since 1990, Dobrovolsky collaborated with the neo-pagan Russian Party of Korchagin. Dobrovolsky conducted the first mass rite of naming, a rite that became widespread in the Rodnovery. Then he retired to the abandoned village of Vesenyovo in Kirov Oblast, where he lived as a hermit and spent the summer holidays of Kupala. He led the "Russian Liberation Movement" (ROD).

== Features ==
In Russian neo-paganism, the idea of the Jewish-Khazar origin of Prince Vladimir the Great is popular, explaining why he introduced Christianity, allegedly an instrument for the enslavement of the "Aryans" by Jews. Roman Shizhensky singles out the neo-pagan myth about Vladimir and characterizes it as one of the most "odious" neo-pagan historical myths and one of the main Russian neo-pagan myths in terms of worldview significance. The author of this myth is Valery Yemelyanov, one of the founders of Russian neo-paganism, who expounded it in his book "Dezionization" (1970s).

Vladimir was the son of Prince Svyatoslav from Malusha, the housekeeper of his mother, Princess Olga. Yemelyanov said that the name Malusha is derived from the Jewish name Malka. He claimed that Malusha's father was a "rabbi"—a rabbi who also bore the Hebrew name Malk. The "Nesterov censorship" of the Christian period, carried out in relation to the pre-Christian chronicles that existed, according to Yemelyanov, distorted the "rabbinich" in relation to Vladimir into "robichich" (the son of a slave - Malusha). Yemelyanov wrote that Vladimir was guilty of the murder of his brother Yaropolk and the usurpation of power.

At the same time, according to Yemelyanov, he went through the "school of the usurper" when he was on a two-year internship in Western European countries. In the reign of Vladimir in Rus', idols first appear and human sacrifices are practiced (contrary to the "Aryan" faith); ten years of idolatry and the resulting discontent of the people paved the way for baptism.

From Yemelyanov, the myth of Vladimir was borrowed by another founder of Russian neo-paganism, Alexey Dobrovolsky (Dobroslav). Dobrovolsky, in accordance with his views, singled out the anti-heroes of Russian history. The central place in this black list was assigned to Prince Vladimir the Great. Dobroslav repeated the first part of this myth without changes and supplemented the second part of the myth about the deeds of Vladimir with new details. Vladimir Istarkhov, in addition to the myth about Vladimir, claims that the prince destroyed the "Slavic chronicle", "the detailed Chronicle of the Russian Empire" and introduced a ban on Russian history before baptism. The process of the baptism of Rus' is represented by the Christian genocide.

The neo-pagan myth about Vladimir was reproduced with various changes by other neo-pagan authors. V. M. Dyomin repeated the ideas about the huge human sacrifices with which the Christianization of Rus' was carried out, and about the destruction by Christians of the wealth of monuments of pre-Christian writing. One of the neo-pagan authors, Lev Prozorov, repeating the myth about Vladimir, accused the prince of betraying the faith of his ancestors. The myth about Vladimir has become widespread among the authors of various Russian neo-pagan articles and writings.

S. Maltsev writes: "Malusha is the daughter of the last Khazar king, having married Rogneda, Vladimir committed the gravest racial crime" (entered into an interracial marriage). In fiction, the myth of Vladimir is reflected, in particular, in the novel of the neo-pagan writer Sergey Alekseyev "I know God!" (1999). According to the work, the mother of Vladimir Malush was a rootless slave of the Khazars, who was recaptured from the latter by Prince Igor. This introduction of the Khazar element into the environment of the Russian princes was planned in advance and carried out by the Khazar-Jewish elite of the Khazar Khaganate. Alekseyev portrayed Vladimir as a greedy egoist, usurer, dreaming of world Jewish domination.

== Demographics ==
=== Social composition of Russian Rodnovery ===
The scholar Kaarina Aitamurto observed that a "substantial number" of Russian Rodnovers, and in particular the earliest adherents, belonged to the "technical intelligentsia". Similarly, the scholar Victor Schnirelmann noted that the founders of Russian Rodnovery were "well-educated urbanized intellectuals" who had become frustrated with "cosmopolitan urban culture". Physicists were particularly well represented; in this Aitamurto drew comparisons to the high number of computer professionals who were present in the Pagan communities of Western countries. The movement also involved a significant number of people who had a background in the Soviet or Russian Army, or in policing and security. A questionnaire distributed at the Kupala festival in Maloyaroslavets suggested that Native Faith practitioners typically had above-average levels of education, with a substantial portion working as business owners or managers. A high proportion were also involved in specialist professions such as engineering, the academia, or information technology, and the majority lived in cities. The "vast majority" of Russian Rodnovers were young and there were a greater proportion of men than women.

The historian Marlène Laruelle similarly noted that Rodnovery in Russia has spread mostly among the young people and the cultivated middle classes, that portion of Russian society interested in the post-Soviet revival of faith but turned off by Orthodox Christianity, "which is very institutionalized, moralistic" and "out of tune with the modern world", and "is not appealing [to these people] because it expects its faithful to comply with normative beliefs without room for interpretation". Rodnovery is attractive because of its "paradoxical conjunction" of tradition and modernity, recovery of the past through innovative syntheses and millenarian projections, and because of its values calling for a rediscovery of the true relationship between mankind, nature and the ancestors. Rodnovery has taken strong roots in the North Caucasus region of Russia, especially among communities of Cossacks and in the Stavropol Krai, where in some areas it is reported to have become the dominant religion. It has also been reported that even former priests of the Russian Orthodox Church have joined the Rodnover movement.

Studying the specific Rodnover movement of Anastasianism, organised in networks of "ancestral villages" and "homesteads", the scholar Artemy A. Pozanenko observed that the inhabitants of the Anastasian settlements which he studied were for three fourths members of the "urban intelligentsia with higher education", with 75% of them having graduated from university, a majority in technical and natural sciences, and others in humanities. Single people were extremely rare, as they are often refused admission since they risk not continuing the kinship line, not taking root and not becoming attached to the place, contravening the central values of Anastasianism. On the other hand, large families are encouraged, and Pozanenko noted that the birth rate in Anastasian villages was "definitely higher than in the whole country".

Rodnover ideas are disseminated through a variety of newspapers and journals. The movement has contributed to the diffusion of "historical themes"—particularly regarding an ancient Aryan race—to the population at large, even beyond the boundaries of Rodnovery itself among Orthodox or non-religious people. A number of subcultures have been credited with favouring the approach of the youth to Rodnovery, including heavy metal music, historical reenactment, and the admirers of J. R. R. Tolkien. Many Rodnovers are martial artists, and there is a specific movement of Rodnover martial arts known as Slavyano-goritskaya bor'ba. Rodnovery has also been publicly embraced by some celebrities, including the singer Maria Arkhipova, the professional boxer Aleksandr Povetkin, and the comedian Mikhail Nikolayevich Zadornov (1948–2017). In the 2020s, some within the Russian political administration, including the lawyer Natalia Poklonskaya and the governor of Vologda Oblast, Georgy Filimonov, publicly embraced Rodnovery.

=== Political composition of Russian Rodnovery ===
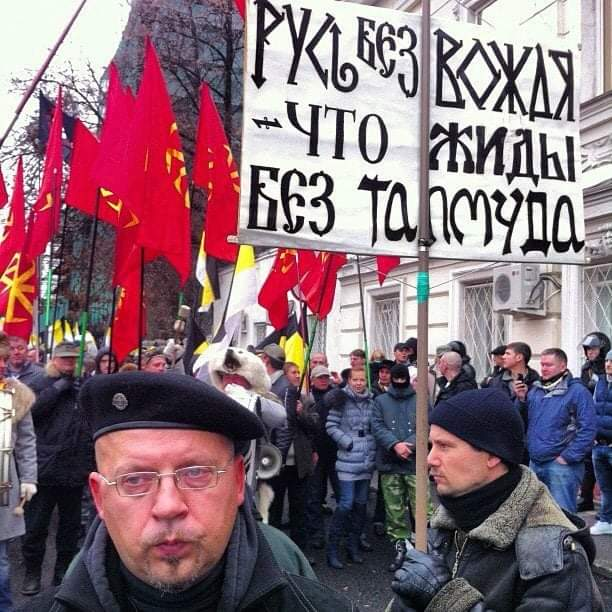
"Russian March" in 2012 in Moscow. An anti-Semitic poster against the background of flags with a nationalist and neopagan symbol "Kolovrat". The poster reads: "Rus' without a Vozhd is like zhyds without a Talmud."

Researchers note a close connection between Russian neo-paganism and Russian nationalism. Schnirelmann observed that Rodnovery in Russia has been embraced by many politically engaged philosophers, both of the right and the left wing of politics.

The former group is represented by Vladimir Avdeyev, Anatoly Ivanov, Pavel Tulayev (members of the Moscow Slavic Community and founders of the New Right journal Ateney), Alexey Trekhlebov from Krasnodar, Valery Demin from Omsk, and the Saint Petersburg journalists Oleg Gusev and Roman Perin, among others. The scholar Adrian Ivakhiv reported that these intellectuals have a "surprisingly extensive" influence. The well-known Rodnover volkhv Velimir (Nikolay Speransky) is the founder of the politically neutral Circle of Pagan Tradition. The right wing is represented by Valery Yemelyanov, volkhv Dobroslav (Alexey Dobrovolsky), Vladimir Istarkhov, Igor Sinyavin, the Union of Slavic Native Belief Communities founded by Vadim Kazakov, and the Nav Society of Ilya Lazarenko, Anton Platov, Alexander Asov, and Alexander Khinevich (founder of Ynglism), although most of their activities took place outside of politics.

Since the 1990s, Traditionalist School thinkers—chiefly René Guénon and the Italian Pagan philosopher Julius Evola—were translated and introduced in the very mainstream of Russian thought by the philosopher Aleksandr Dugin, who has an influential position in contemporary Russian academic and political life. In the 1980s Dugin became a member of the Yuzhinsky Circle, an occult proto-Rodnover group influenced by Guido von List and Aryan mysticism, founded by the poet Yevgeny Golovin, the novelist Yury Mamleyev and the philosopher Vladimir Stepanov in the 1960s. According to the scholar Robert A. Saunders, some strands of Rodnovery have become close supporters and constituents of Eurasianism, an ideology whose most prominent contemporary proponent is Dugin himself.

Many Rodnovers participate in the Russian marches. On November 4, 2013, the "Russian March" in St. Petersburg was attended by representatives of the "Skhoron Yezh Sloven" association, headed by their high priest Vladimir Golyakov (Bogumil the Second Golyak). At the initiative of Golyakov, the march resolution included words about "the liberation of the Slavs from foreign occupation." A separate column of Rodnovers was present for the first time at the Russian march which took place in Moscow on November 4, 2013. At the Russian march in Lyublino (Moscow), neo-pagan symbolism was dominant. The event in Lyublino was attended, in particular, by Vladimir Istarkhov, the author of the neo-pagan book "The Strike of the Russian Gods", and his "Russian Right Party".

Rodnoverie is a popular religion among Russian skinheads. These skinheads, however, do not usually practice their religion.

In Russia, in the context of the crisis and collapse of the communist ideology, some communists turned to the ideas of Slavic neo-paganism, abandoning Marxism in favor of nationalism. Various small groups of communists adopted a neo-pagan ideology. In April 1991, at the second initiative congress of the Communist Party of the Russian Federation, a member of the neo-pagan "Union of Veneti", Nina Taldykina, called for the rejection of the teachings of the "Jewish Talmudist" Karl Marx and the "non-Russian demagogue" Vladimir Lenin. Taldykina became one of the main ideologues of the Leningrad organization of the Communist Party.

In a large number of writings, members of the "Vedic Center" "Internal Predictor of the USSR" promote the idea that Stalin was the antagonist of Lenin and transformed the communist movement, distorted by Marxist internationalism, into a nationalist and genuinely socialist (i.e., National Socialist) movement. According to these authors, Stalin restored and enlarged the Russian Empire by conquering other peoples and suppressing the Jews, and the urgent task of the patriots is to revive the original pagan faith, Stalinism and the Stalinist state. Organized by this "Vedic Center", the movement "Toward the Power of God" was registered in 70 cities.

The Ryazan community, which is part of the Union of Slavic Native Belief Communities, supports communists.

=== Estimates of the number of Russian Rodnovers ===
Russian Neopagans

Arena Atlas 2012: 1.7 million
ROC of Astrakhan 2015: 2+ million
Tsirkon 2012: 40% of Russians were "pagans", non-Christians (excl. Muslims)

Russian Neopagan subdivisions

Arena Atlas 2012: 750,000 Rodnovers & 950,000 other Pagans
Yashin 2001: 3,000 Ynglists in Omsk
Omsk District Court 2009: 13,000 Ynglists in Omsk
Prokofiev et al. 2006: 40,000 Slavic-Hill practitioners
Knorre 2006: 10,000 Ivanovites
Tambovtseva 2019: 7,000–10,000 Vseyasvetniks

Russian Anastasian villagers

Ozhiganova 2015: 10,989
Pozanenko 2016: 12,000–50,000

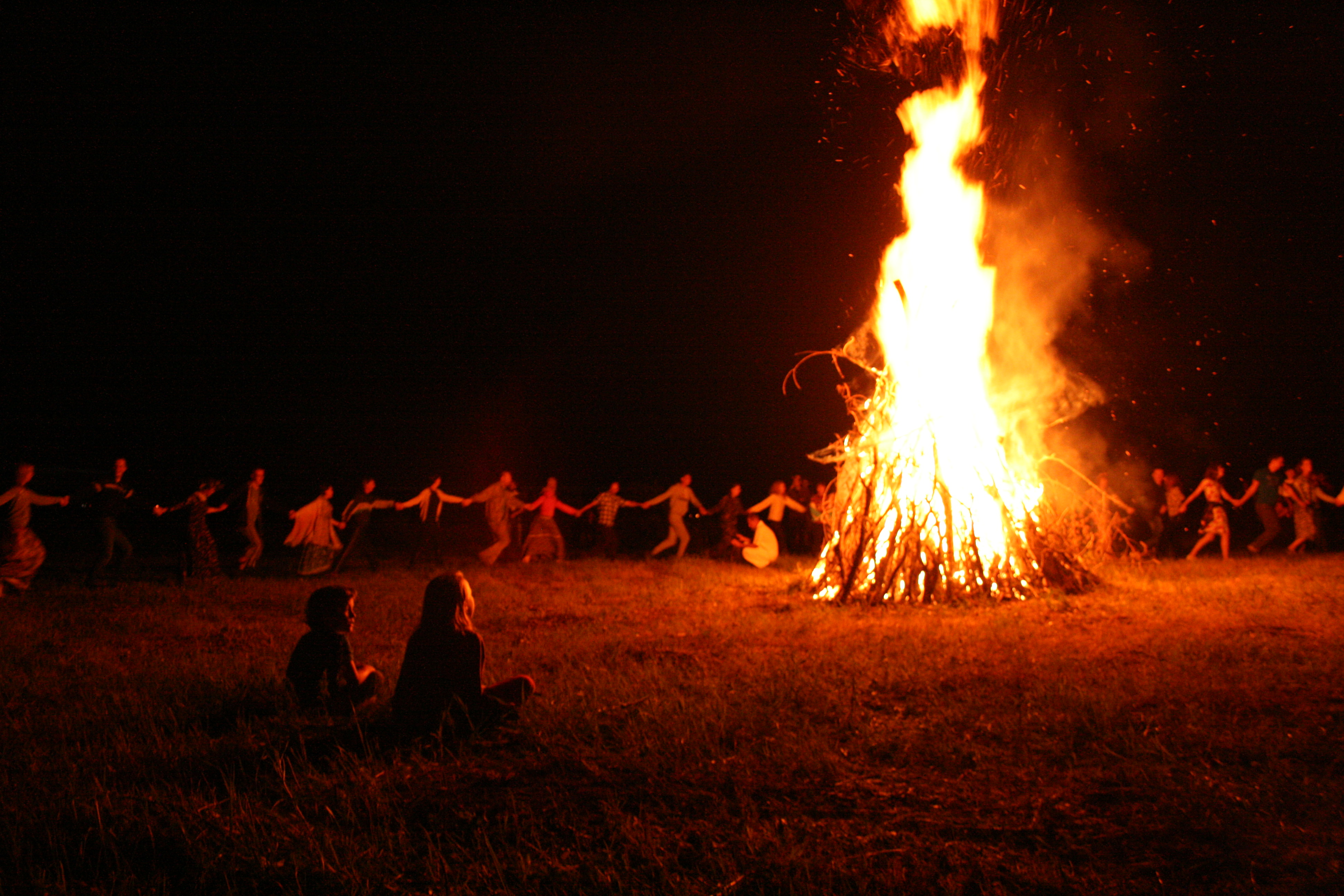
Celebration of Kupala Night

Writing in 2000, Schnirelmann noted that Rodnovery was growing rapidly within the Russian Federation. As of 2003, the Russian Ministry of Justice had registered forty Rodnover organisations, while there were "probably several hundred of them in existence". The scholar Vladimir Yashin reported that in 2001 the specific denomination of Ynglism had 3,000 adherents in the city of Omsk alone, while in 2009 it was reported at the Omsk District Court that Ynglists in the city had reached the number of 13,000. In 2006, scholars reported that there were around 40,000 practitioners in the Slavic-Hill movement of Rodnover martial arts. In the same year, the scholar B. K. Knorre estimated 10,000 practitioners of Ivanovism. In 2016, Aitamurto noted that there was no reliable information on the number of Rodnovers in Russia, but that it was plausible that there were several tens of thousands of practitioners active in the country. This was partly because there were several Rodnover groups active on the social network VK which had over 10,000 members. In 2019, the scholar Svetlana Tambovtseva estimated 7,000 to 10,000 adepts of Vseyasvetnaya Gramota (Vseyasvetniks).

The 2012 Sreda Arena Atlas complement to the 2010 census of Russia, found 1.7 million people (1.2% of the total population of the country) identifying themselves as "Pagans" or followers of "traditional religions, worship of gods and ancestors". Of these 1.7 million people, 44% or 750,000 were ethnic Russians following the religions of their ancestors, while the remaining 950,000 were other types of Pagans (including Ossetians following Assianism, Siberian peoples following Tengrism, and other religions). Besides Slavic Rodnovery, among ethnic Russians there are also followers of Heathenry (Germanic religion), Druidry (Celtic religion), Hellenism (Greek religion), as well as Wicca and other traditions.

A polemical article entitled Adversus paganos, published in 2015 by the journal of the Ascension Cathedral of Astrakhan, cited sociological data saying that Rodnovery was already formally embraced by "more than 2 million Russians", while the number of people affected by Rodnover ideas was several times larger. This was based on data provided in 2012 by Igor Zadorin, the director of the research institute "Tsirkon", who said that in Russia the proportions of atheists, Orthodox Christians and "pagans" were of comparable sizes and their populations overlapped: Orthodox Christians were 30% of the total population; people who had some sort of "pagan", non-Christian spirituality, were 40% of the population, while the remaining population was composed of a 20% who were atheists, and a 10% who were believers of other religions (4–7% ethnic minorities professing Islam).

The movement of the Anastasians keeps official registers of the number of Anastasian villages and their dwellers. The scholar Anna Ozhiganova reported that in 2015, in Russia, more than ten years after the establishment of the first Anastasian settlements, there were 2,264 people in 981 families who were landowners of an ancestral homestead, and other 8,725 people in 4,725 families who were at different stages of construction of their own ancestral homestead. The scholar Artemy A. Pozanenko reported a similar number of Anastasian villagers, 12,000, in 2016, noting that the number had more than doubled between 2013 and 2015, and yet it was "unwittingly underestimated", given that although the statistics were based on the official registers of the movement, they were not promptly updated and many settlements and settlers did not register on purpose, so that a participant in inter-Anastasian events estimated the number to be closer to 50,000. Pozanenko also reported that there were on average 5-6 ancestral settlements in each region of European Russia and western Siberia, with some regions having a number in the double digits (such as 30 in Krasnodar Krai); the largest settlements were found in Moscow Oblast, in Krasnodar Krai, in the southern and middle Ural region, and in Novosibirsk Oblast.

In 2019, the scholars Anna A. Konopleva and Igor O. Kakhuta stated that "the popularity of Neopaganism in Russia is obvious". According to the scholar Andrey Beskov, the number of Rodnovers and generally modern Pagans in Russia might be larger than what surveys attest, as many of those people who identify themselves as "Orthodox" might actually be Rodnovers, as the views of the two religious groups border each other, or "flow smoothly into one another, combining in the worldview of a modern Russian". Some scholars have determined that many self-identifying "Orthodox" are clearly Pagans, and that it is common in the Russian mindset to identify "Russian Orthodoxy" as Rodnovery, and as different and even opposite to Christianity. Many Rodnovers call themselves "Orthodox" because the Russian term for "Orthodoxy", Pravoslaviye (Православие), means "to praise the Right" (славить Правь, slavit' Prav'), a concept which also belongs to Rodnover theology and cosmology, and which identifies the celestial plane of the gods of light and the order of the universe. According to Beskov, in modern Russia "interest in East Slavic Paganism is very large and remains unabated since the beginning of the 1990s", and there is "a tectonic shift in public thinking which is characterised by the return to the Russian culture of Pagan heritage and the public recognition of the significant contribution of East Slavic Paganism in the formation of national culture". The beliefs of such community are, however, very variegated and may be described as an ietsism (an unspecified belief in an undetermined transcendent force) characterised by a Slavic coloration, or as Slavic "spirituality" or "spiritualism".

== Russian Rodnovers and the war in Donbas ==
Rodnovery had a significant role in the war in Donbas, with many Rodnovers joining pro-Russian armed forces in Donetsk and Luhansk. In 2014 the Donetsk People's Republic adopted a "constitution" which stated that the Russian Orthodox Church of the Moscow Patriarchate was the official religion of the self-declared state. This was changed with the promulgation of a law "on freedom of conscience and religious organisation", backed by three deputies professing Rodnovery, whose members organised the pro-Russian Svarozhich Battalion (of the Vostok Brigade) and the Rusich Company.

Donbas has been documented as being a stronghold of Russian Rodnover groups that are reorganising local villages and society according to traditional Indo-European trifunctionalism (according to which males are born to play one out of three roles in society, as priests, warriors or farmers).

Russian Rodnover military formations in Donbas included the Svarog, Varyag and Rusich formations, and Rodnovers within the Russian Orthodox Army. Observers have highlighted that Russian Rodnovers had been proselytising in the region, with the endorsement of Russia, under the name "Orthodoxy" and preaching the concept of a new "Russian World", and that their beliefs even permeated the Orthodox Christian church.

Since the outbreak of the war, though not necessarily in connection with it, Rodnover and Orthodox Christian military groups also sprung up in Moscow, reportedly dividing the capital into respective zones of influence, "cities within the city" with their own armed forces, with support from local security officials. Rodnover soldiers often help the local population in its opposition to the Orthodox Christian hierarchy's plans to build new churches around the city.

== Russian Rodnover fine arts ==
The rise of Rodnovery, and its rapid growth as a multidimensional phenomenon, has brought to the establishment of an artistic scene as part of such multidimensionality. Many professional artists, many of whom are outspokenly Rodnover themselves—some even priests, have emerged with works discussing themes of history, mythology and everyday life. Their works are highly appreciated and celebrated within the Rodnover community. Studies on Rodnover art have found that Svyatoslav I of Kiev is one of the preferred subjects among other historical themes, epic heroes and other human prototypes (even including the appropriation of saints of the Russian Orthodox Church).

Russian artists of Rodnover themes include Aleksandr Borisovich Uglanov, Andrey Alekseyevich Shishkin, Andrey Guselnikov, Andrey Klimenko, Boris Olshansky, Igor Ozhiganov, Leo Khao, Maksim Kuleshov, Maksim Sukharev, Maximilian Presnyakov, Nella Genkina, Nikolay Speransky, Valery Semochkin, Viktor Korolkov, Vladimir Pingachov, Vsevolod Ivanov. Another artist, whose works are widely appreciated within the Rodnover community, was Konstantin Vasilyev (1942–1976).

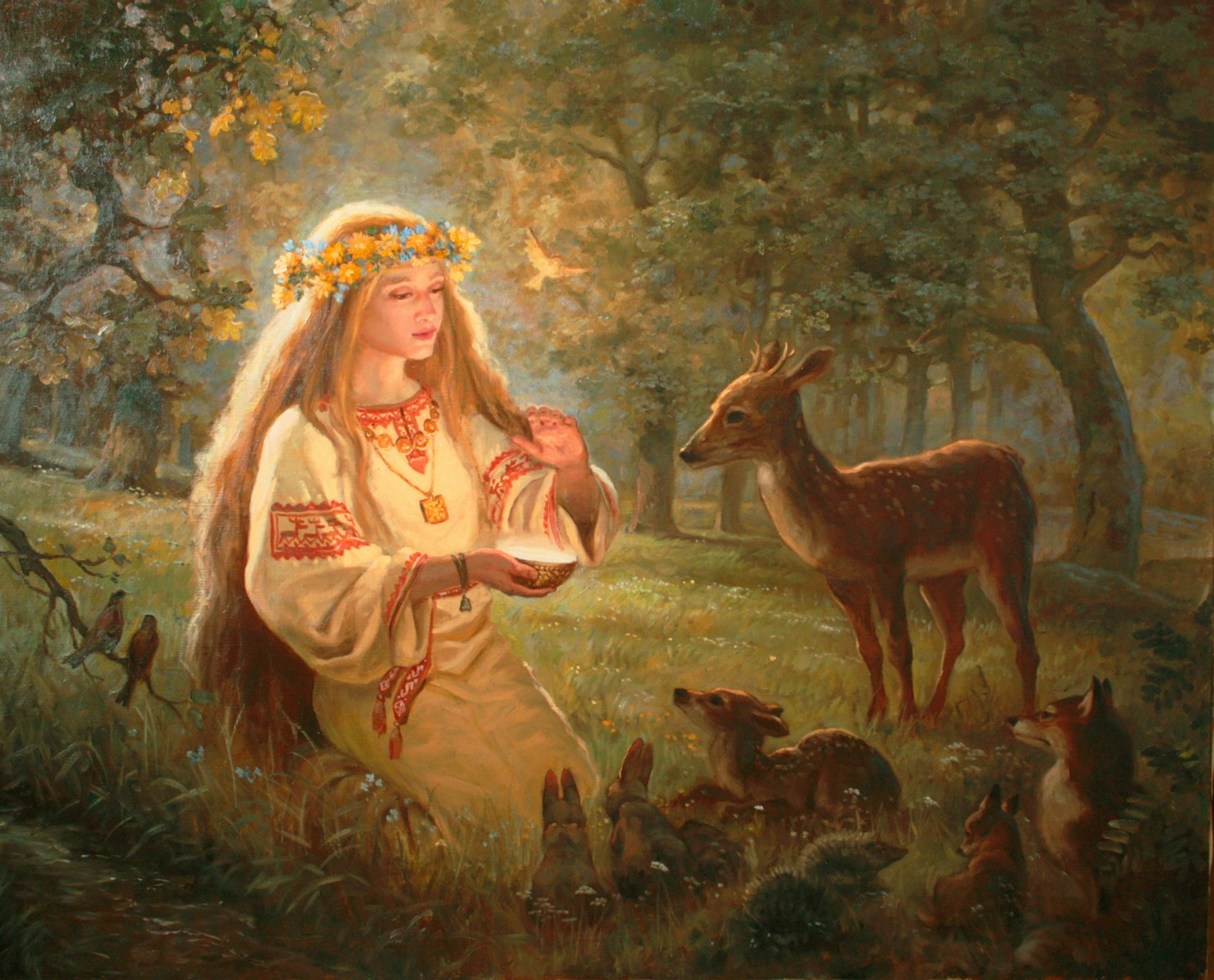
Zhiva, by Andrey Shishkin

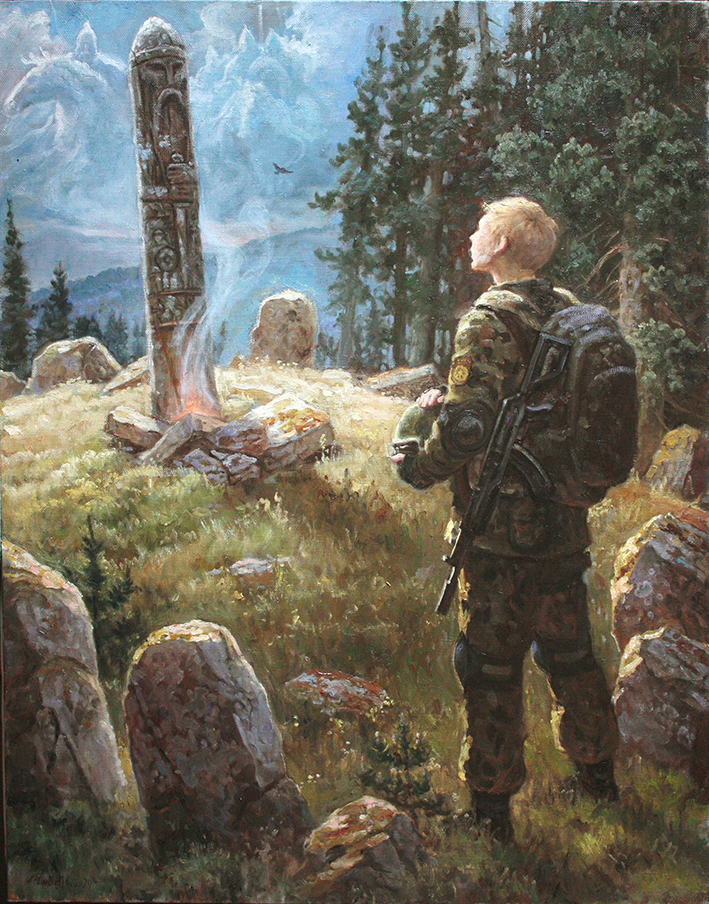
The Path of the Warrior, by Andrey Shishkin

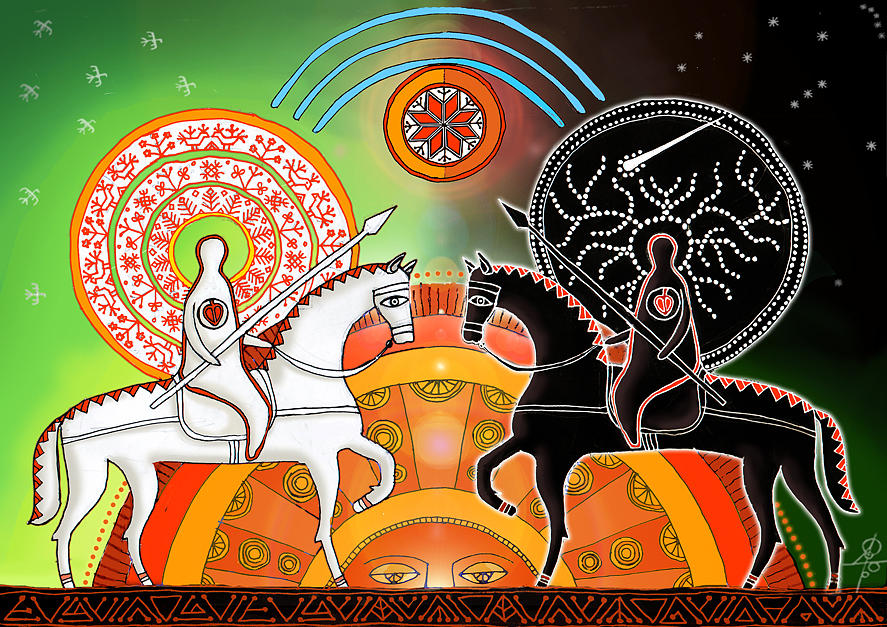
Belobog and Chernobog, by Maxim Sukharev

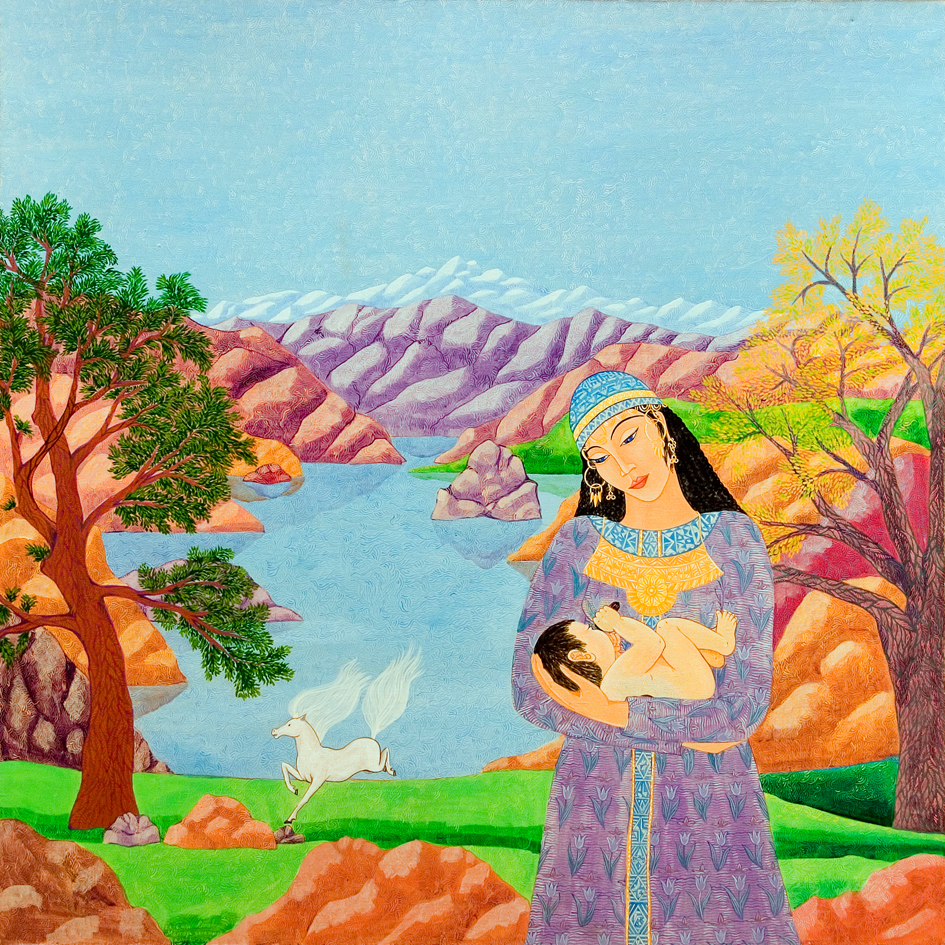
Mother of Altai's Hero, by Lola Lonli

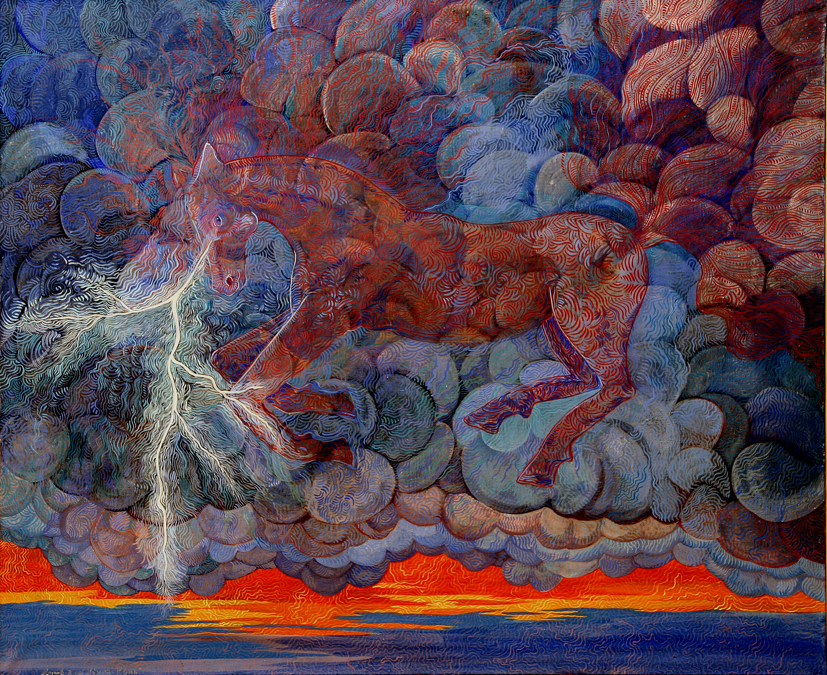
Thunder Horse, by Lola Lonli

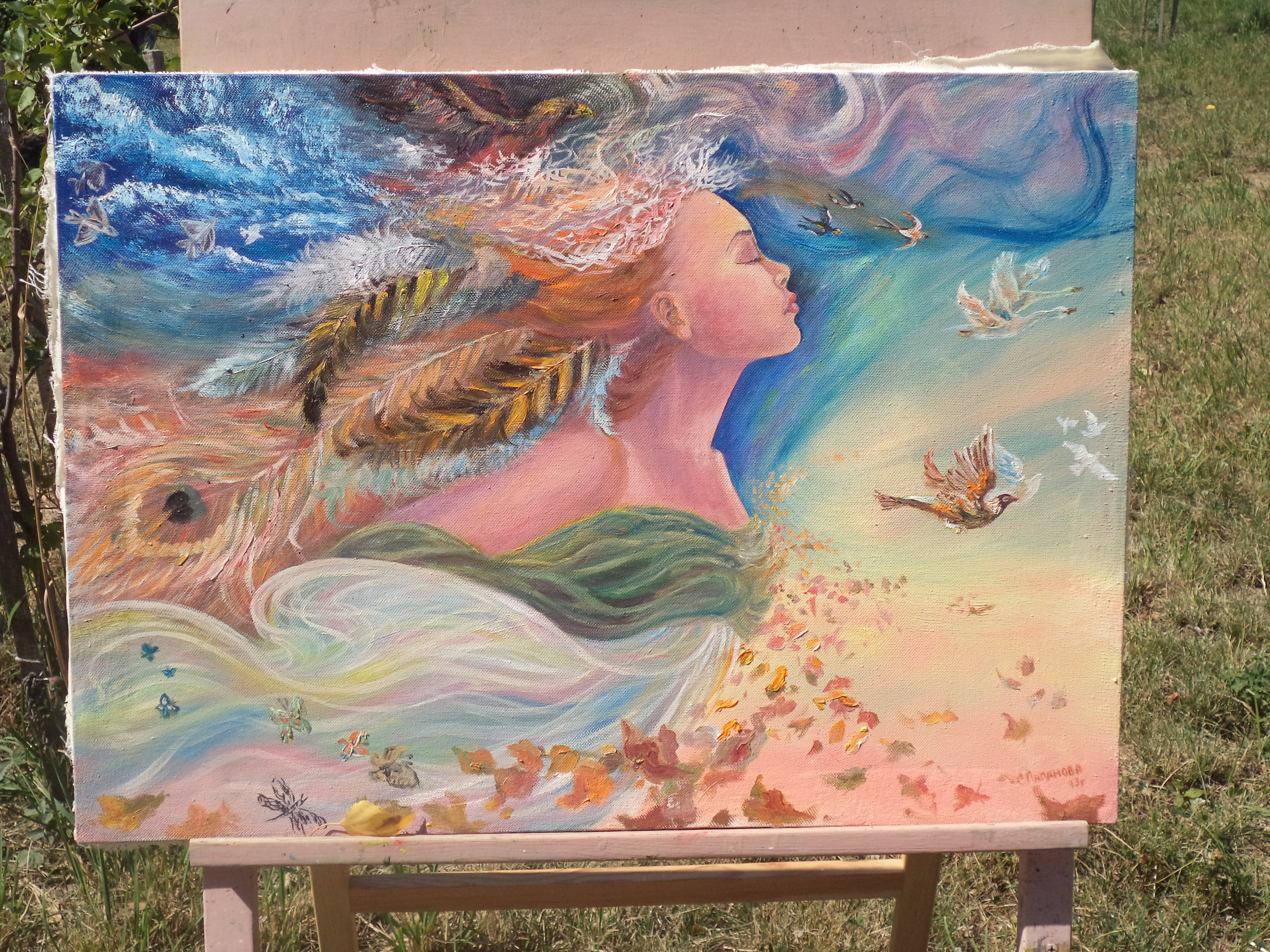
Anastasian painting at a festival in Belgorod

== See also ==
- Religion in Russia
- Religion in Europe
- Slavic Native Faith in Poland
- Slavic Native Faith in Ukraine
- Proto-Indo-European religion
  - Proto-Indo-Iranian religion
    - Historical Vedic religion
    - Ancient Iranian religion
