= Zionist as a pejorative =

The word Zionist is sometimes used as a pejorative term to disparage Jews, Israelis, or supporters of Israel. This is in contrast to the literal use of the word Zionist, which the Oxford English Dictionary defines as originally "an advocate or supporter of a movement among Jewish people for the re-establishment of a Jewish nation in Palestine" and later "an advocate or supporter of the development and protection of the state of Israel" after the establishment of the State of Israel in 1948.

Other terms derived from Zionist are also used pejoratively. The abbreviation Zio was popularized as an antisemitic slur by American white supremacist David Duke.

== History ==
According to sociologist Robert Brym, the term Zionism reached the peak of its positive connotation in North America between the 1958 publication Leon Uris's novel Exodus and the 1967 Six-Day War. Following the war and the ongoing Israeli occupation of the West Bank, the Golan Heights, and the Gaza Strip, Brym notes that the term underwent pejoration (acquiring a negative connotation), and that the phrase "Zionism is racism" began to increase in appearance across printed books starting in 1968. By 2022, "Zionism is racism" appeared 129 times more frequently in printed books than it had in 1968. He suggests this pejoration helps explain why only 49% of Canadian Jews identified as Zionists, despite 94% supporting the existence of a Jewish state in Israel.

In 2010, the British charity Community Security Trust (CST) said that "Zionist" was increasingly used as an antisemitic pejorative term in mainstream British discourse. The CST also alleged that the conflation of "Zionist" with "Jew" was becoming more common, and could obscure antisemitic intent.

In 2016, the British Labour Party released the results of an inquiry into antisemitism in the party, which stated that "Epithets such as [...] 'Zio' and others should have no place in Labour party discourse going forward." Speaking at the inquiry's launch, party leader Jeremy Corbyn stated that "'Zio' is a vile epithet that follows in a long line of earlier such terms that have no place whatsoever in our party."

The Philologos columnist in Jewish magazine Mosaic, writing in 2016, associated the term, used as an insult for Jews, with white-supremacists and said that it was popularized by antisemite David Duke, whose Ku Klux Klan website WikiZio uses Zio as a hyphenated prefix in terms such as "Zio-Communism," "Zio-economics," "Zio-history," "Zio-supremacism," or "Zio-occupied America."

In 2017, the organizers of the Chicago Dyke March faced accusations of antisemitism after their Twitter account used the term "Zio tears", later apologizing for the term's "violent history" while maintaining their anti-Zionist stance. In April of the same year, Terry Couchman, an election candidate of the British Labour Party, was suspended over his use of "ZioNazi" in a post criticising Israel. Tony Greenstein, then a Jewish member of the Labour Party, was accused of antisemitism and expelled from the party in 2018 for using the term "Zios" among other allegations. Ben Samuels of Haaretz said that the term was popularized first by David Duke and then later by leftists and members of the UK Labour Party.

A quantitative content analysis of 99,062 tweets surrounding the 2018 U.S. elections found that just under 50% of the uses of the word Zionist were in an antisemitic context, and that #zionists was the hashtag with the third-highest rate of associated antisemitic content, behind #soros and #votered. Antisemitic uses of the word were common in QAnon-related tweets.

In 2021, when a South African media outlet used the term "Zio-Nazi" for South African Jewish groups, Czech-Israeli Holocaust historian Yehuda Bauer and author Matthias Küntzel called the term "hate speech".

Jonathan Guyer wrote in The Guardian that the term Zionism means different things to different people, citing a 2022 survey of American Jews' views on Zionism conducted by Mira Sucharov of Carleton University. The survey showed that a majority of American Jews identified as Zionist when it was defined as supporting a "Jewish and democratic state", but would reject the label if it was defined as "privileging Jewish rights over non-Jewish rights in Israel".

=== Use during the Gaza war ===
==== Contested meanings of Zionism ====
Jonathan Guyer, writing in The Guardian in April 2024, said that since the start of the Gaza war, “Zionism” had become a slur on the American left: "On social media and in the streets, critics no longer call out supporters of the state of Israel as 'pro-Israel': they call them Zionist. Some university encampments have posted signs saying: 'Zionists not allowed.'"

According to American scholar Saree Makdisi, "when people think of Zionism now, they look at Gaza... This is what it means: that you want to have an ethnically exclusive state," and, according to him, "it's ugly." According to IfNotNow co-founder Simone Zimmerman, "a lot more young people, including young Jews, are listening to their Palestinian friends and classmates who are saying: 'This is what Zionism means to us.'"

==== Meta ====
In July 2024, Meta imposed restrictions on the use of the term Zionist. There had been discussions at Facebook over the moderation of the term 'Zionist' in 2021 amid pressure from various organizations following an August 2020 letter for the company to adopt the IHRA definition of antisemitism. +972 Magazine reported that Jordana Cutler, Facebook's director of public policy for Israel and the Jewish diaspora and former advisor to Benjamin Netanyahu, was a key figure in these discussions at Facebook.

Under Meta's prior internal policy regarding the term, as reported in 2021, moderators were only to remove content using the term Zionist it was deemed to be used as a proxy for Israeli or Jewish. Meta's 2024 policy change enabled moderators to enforce the rule more expansively. In a Meta Policy Forum update:

Going forward, we will remove content attacking 'Zionists' when it is not explicitly about the political movement, but instead uses antisemitic stereotypes, or threatens other types of harm through intimidation, or violence directed against Jews or Israelis under the guise of attacking Zionists, including claims about running the world or controlling the media, dehumanizing comparisons, such as comparisons to pigs, filth, or vermin, calls for physical harm, denials of existence, and mocking for having a disease.

Yasmine Taeb of MPower Change told pro-Palestine left-wing news organization The Intercept that the ADL and the American Jewish Committee had been lobbying Meta to restrict usage of Zionist on its platforms, though the Meta spokesperson said the policy change was not made "at the behest of any outside group." A letter sent to Meta by 73 organizations, including 7amleh, Jewish Voice for Peace, the Council on American–Islamic Relations (CAIR) and others, stated that the policy change would "too easily mischaracterize conversations about Zionists – and by extension, Zionism – as inherently antisemitic" and "encourage the incorrect and harmful conflation of criticism of the acts of the state of Israel with antisemitism."

Scholar of antisemitism and U.S. Special Envoy to Monitor and Combat Antisemitism Ambassador Deborah Lipstadt praised the change as "an important step in mitigating the rampant spread of online antisemitism". It was also praised by the Combat Antisemitism Movement, CyberWell, and Israeli special envoy for combating antisemitism Michal Cotler-Wunsh. Writing in The Forward, Mira Fox called it a "decent policy", responsive to a status quo wherein "bad actors [use Zionist] to provide plausible deniability for even the most boldly antisemitic statements" and "antisemitic use of "Zionist" as a synonym for "Jew" has been around basically as long as the political movement of Zionism has". Fox questioned why this new Meta policy had not always been the standard.

==== On college campuses ====
In 2024, David Bernstein reported that support for Zionism had become a political 'litmus test' leading to social exclusion of Jewish students on many American college campuses following the Hamas-led October 7 attacks on Israel. In 2024, following many harassment complaints, the University of Illinois Urbana-Champaign banned the ostracizing of Jewish students from school clubs for identifying as Zionist.

In September 2024, Columbia University updated its anti-discrimination policy to classify the use of "Zionist" as a pejorative as potential harassment when directed at individuals based on religion or national origin. The policy cited examples where "Zionist" was used as a coded term to target Jewish or Israeli students and emphasized the distinction between political speech and discriminatory conduct. The update followed a critical report on campus antisemitism and mirrored similar actions by other universities, including NYU.

In October 2025, Samuel Williams, a PPE student at the University of Oxford, faced a Metropolitan Police investigation after leading chants of "Gaza, Gaza make us proud, put the Zios in the ground," which he claimed to have workshopped in Oxford, with several others joining in. The University of Oxford condemned the chant "in the strongest possible terms," stating, "Oxford is unequivocal – there is no place for anti-Semitism, harassment, or discrimination within our community. We remain firmly committed to protecting the safety and dignity of all our students and staff."

In August 2024, New York University (NYU) updated the anti-harassment guidelines on its website to include the text "For many Jewish people, Zionism is a part of their Jewish identity. Speech and conduct that would violate the NDAH (non-discrimination and anti-harassment policy) if targeting Jewish or Israeli people can also violate the NDAH if directed toward Zionists," and "Using code words, like 'Zionist', does not eliminate the possibility that your speech violates the NDAH Policy," characterizing 'Zionist' as a protected class shielded by Title VI of the Civil Rights Act of 1964 from "adverse treatment." In response, the Middle East Studies Association's Committee on Academic Freedom sent NYU a public letter expressing concern, describing the new classification as "rooted in the improper conflation of criticism of Israel and of Zionism – a political ideology – with antisemitism." Palestine Legal described NYU's policy change as "draconian" and criticized the claim "that Zionist is an identity meriting protection under Title VI of the Civil Rights Act of 1964, rather than a political ideology used to justify apartheid and genocide." Free speech advocacy group FIRE also criticized the decision, writing that, though use of the word Zionist may be part of a pattern of discriminatory harassment at NYU, the new policy classifies protected political speech as such. NYU's chapter of Jewish on Campus praised the policy.

== Analysis and commentary ==
Organizations such as the American Jewish Committee (AJC) and the London Centre for the Study of Antisemitism have said the term Zionist is being used as an antisemitic pejorative.

According to the American Jewish Committee (AJC), "Zio" is used by antisemites to pass off their antisemitism as anti-Zionism and can be a euphemism for "Jew". Writer Ariel Sobel of the Jewish Journal stated that "Zio" was an antisemitic slur with roots within antisemitic right-wing extremist circles that had been adopted by some progressives in their activism.

British sociologist David Hirsh has argued that use of the word Zionist in a disparaging way is not distinct from antisemitism:

in our day the word “Zionism” itself often functions as an antisemitic curse word, which hurts and discredits Jews… It is a repackaging of old antisemitic understandings of the term “Chosen people,” a term that was already in Christian traditions a repackaging of nuanced, complex, and developing ways in which Jews thought about themselves… The word “Zionism” in antizionist usage conveys a familiar mixture of contempt and fear, as have previous words that have been used against Jews. It does this in a world in which the old words and languages have become discredited.

British antisemitism scholar David Seymour argues that what he calls “antizionism” is an ideology that portrays an imaginary version of “Zionism” as a demonic evil, demonising Jews while claiming that it is only “Zionists” that it targets.

An analysis of online comments and social media posts by Romanian scholar Adina Marincea found that Zionist has become a slur and stand-in for Jew in Romanian online discourse, often being used in antisemitic contexts. She writes that this finding is consistent with similar research from other countries, including a 2018 American study of tweets surrounding that year's midterm elections.

== See also ==
- Anti-Zionism
- Dezionization
- Criticism of Israel
- New antisemitism
- Spiritually Israeli, an internet pejorative relating to Zionism and Israel
