= Anti-Zionist circle =

USSR propaganda campaign

The "Anti-Zionist Circle" (Russian: Антисионистский кружок) was an informal group of Soviet publicists who professionally provided domestic propaganda justification for the USSR's pro-Arab and anti-Israeli policies in the Middle East. Active since the early 1960s, it received its name later. It constituted a significant part of the Russian nationalist movement, which became known as the Russian Party.

Within the circle, it was common practice for "their own" to emphasize their anti-Semitism and "achievements" in the fight against specific Jews. Information from the books of these "anti-Zionists" was used without critical examination by other activists of the "Russian Party". Most of the "anti-Zionists" maintained an outward loyalty to the Soviet regime and were willing to abide by the restrictions of Soviet censorship, but in private correspondence they made no secret of their opposition. Taking advantage of their status as "loyal" and legal writers, they were able to openly write letters to government officials to draw their attention to the "machinations of Zionists." Their requests were often granted.

As early as 1963-1964, figures such as Yuri Ivanov and Yevgeny Yevseyev were delivering lectures exposing "Zionism" to students at the Young Marxist University in Moscow. From 1966-1968, Yevseyev actively worked with the Komsomol Central Committee, carrying out business trips for the propaganda department and consulting for the Molodaya Gvardiya publishing house.

A significant stimulus for the development of anti-Zionism in Soviet propaganda was the Six-Day War of 1967, which resulted in the Soviet Union breaking off relations with Israel and, among Soviet Jews, intensifying the desire for a Jewish cultural revival and increasing emigration sentiment.

The most senior of these "anti-Zionists" was Ivan Milovanov, head of the Middle East sector of the International Department of the CPSU Central Committee. Milovanov often used his official position to "prevent the machinations of Zionism," allegedly "at the request of our Arab friends". In some cases, he made such requests to KGB Chairman Yuri Andropov using government communications equipment. Milovanov and his close associate, Yuri Ivanov, a Middle East sector official, consulted with and befriended figures such as Valery Yemelyanov, a translator and lecturer at the Maurice Thorez Institute of Foreign Languages; Yevgeny Yevseyev; and journalists A. A. Agaryshev and Vladimir Bolshakov. Writer Valery Ganichev, historians Sergei Semanov and Apollon Kuzmin, and several others also belonged to this circle from the late 1960s. In the early 1970s, the circle began fulfilling a large commission from the Central Committee of the CPSU to provide ideological support for the campaign against Zionism.

At Milovanov's initiative, Yuri Ivanov wrote the book "Caution: Zionism!", which became very popular among Russian nationalists. It was published in 1969, when Yuri Ivanov was overseeing the Communist Party of Israel in the Central Committee of the CPSU. The author explains all the failures and setbacks of the USSR through the machinations of an all-powerful and omnipresent "international Zionism", "the enemy of all peoples... of all freedom-loving people of the globe". Presumably, the apparatus of the CPSU Central Committee recognized the book as "instructional", which may explain its publication in 1972-1973 in Armenian, Tajik, and Kyrgyz. The total circulation of the book in various languages reached 550,000 copies, including 42,000 in Arabic.

The publication of this book marked a turning point in the Soviet Anti-Zionism state's anti-Zionist ideology. Under the guise of "anti-Zionism" and under the slogan of "fighting modern fascism," an anti-Semitic racist concept borrowed from Goebbels' propaganda was introduced into state ideology. In a modified form, it became an integral part of the neo-Stalinist version of Russian communist messianism. Evgeny Evseyev was considered the most prominent intellectual in this milieu. His "scholarly career" culminated in the publication in 1978 of his doctoral dissertation, "Zionism in the System of Anti-Communism", at the Institute of Philosophy of the USSR Academy of Sciences, marked "For Official Use Only". Evseyev also wrote the book "Fascism under the Blue Star", published in 1971 in Moscow by the Komsomol Central Committee in a print run of 75,000 copies, and a number of other works. The monograph was popular among members of the "Russian Party" and provoked a negative reaction from academic scholars. A small number of copies of the publication were distributed to regional party committees. Yevseyev's publications "Fascism under the Star of David" in Komsomolskaya Pravda in 1970, "Zionism, Ideology and Politics" and "Fascism under the Blue Star" (both 1971) are similar in theme to The Protocols of the Elders of Zion: Jews are everywhere and possess omnipotence. Yevseyev, considered a relative of Boris Ponomarev, Secretary of the CPSU Central Committee for International Affairs, was the main disseminator of the legend of the "Jewish wives" of Soviet leaders.

Apollon Kuzmin, a prominent member of the "Russian Party", while serving as deputy editor-in-chief of the academic journal Voprosy Istorii, oversaw "anti-Zionist" publications. Kuzmin, Lidiya Modzharyan, E. D. Pyrlin, and Drastamat Chalyan sent a "Note" dated March 30, 1974, to the International Propaganda Department of the Central Committee of the CPSU, containing a complaint against Aron Vergelis, editor-in-chief of Sovetish Heymland, who, in the pages of his journal, condemned Yevseyev's book "Fascism under the Blue Star". In the 1980s, Kuzmin became involved in a campaign to popularize the literary work of Valentin Ivanov, a member of the Russian Club, writing a lengthy afterword for the mass-market edition of Ivanov's novel Tales of Ancient Years, which was published by Sovremennik in 1985 and 1986 with a print run of 200,000 copies each. In 1986, Molodaya Gvardiya Publishing House launched the library series "History of the Fatherland in Novels, Stories, and Documents" with a reprint of Primordial Rus'. The edition featured introductory articles and a set of appendices by Kuzmin, who recommended it to his students as a textbook. The prefaces presented Kuzmin's personal views on the Varangian-Russian question. In the second half of the 1960s, Dmitry Zhukov, an activist of the Russian Club, writer, and publicist, joined the "anti-Zionist circle"ץ He became known among members of the "Russian Party" primarily as the screenwriter of the film "Secret and Overt (The Goals and Deeds of the Zionists)". The film was directed by Boris Karpov, another member of the Russian Club, and official consultants included other anti-Zionist authors Yevgeny Yevseyev, Lidiya Modzharyan, and Drastamat Chalyan. According to Sergei Semanov, it was commissioned by the KGB. This anti-Zionist and anti-Semitic film details the role of "Jewish conspirators", who, according to the filmmakers, were behind all the key events of the 20th century. The film was completed by 1973 and uses Nazi newsreels. The film's importance to its sponsors is evidenced by the fact that the filmmakers were allowed to travel to three European capitals to obtain the materials. The state approval of "The Secret and the Overt" was delayed for a year by the State Committee for Cinematography, anticipating a mixed reaction to the film. In August 1973, one of the cameramen at the Central Documentary Film Studio, a wartime acquaintance of Leonid Brezhnev, wrote him a letter asking him to prevent the release of an anti-Semitic film. Between August and October 1973, the Cinematography Committee issued its recommendations for reworking the film, which turned it into "ideological chewing gum" that went unnoticed by the public.

During the 1970s and first half of the 1980s, several new members joined the "anti-Zionist" circle, including Minsk journalist Vladimir Begun, author of the document "The Charter of Morals" Valery Skurlatov, Arabic translator G.V. Ryzhikov, and historian Lev Korneyev. A. Ivanov (Skuratov) and Ivan Shevtsov were also close to this circle. Valery Ganichev considered the publication and dissemination of the works of Begun, Yevseyev, Agaryshev, and other "anti-Zionists" to be one of his primary tasks as director of the Molodaya Gvardiya publishing house. In 1977, the CPSU Central Committee reacted negatively to a letter written by Yevseyev and sent on behalf of G.V. Ryzhikov's son about the "rampant Zionism in the USSR".

Among this second generation of the "anti-Zionist circle", Begun became the most famous, having written the book "Invasion Without Weapons," which was published in 1978-1979 alone with a total circulation of 250,000 copies. Begun enjoyed the support of Pyotr Masherov, the leader of the Communist Party of Belarus. However, the academic "anti-Zionists" did not consider Begun one of their own. Several other "Zionologists" spoke out against his "medieval works in form and content", including Academician Mikhail Korostovtsev, Chairman of the Standing Commission for the Coordination of Scientific Critique of Zionism under the Presidium of the Academy of Sciences of the Soviet Union. In November 1975, he sent a letter to Mikhail Suslov, Secretary of the CPSU Central Committee, condemning the publication of Begun's book "Creeping Counterrevolution," which "under the guise of fighting Zionism, preaches outright anti-Semitism". However, Yuri Sklyarov, Deputy Head of the Propaganda Department of the CPSU Central Committee, responded to this letter with the conclusions of specialists from the Department of Nation Theory and National Relations at the Institute of Marxism-Leninism, according to which Begun's book fits perfectly within the mainstream of Leninist national policy.

Since the late 1960s, Young Guard has become the central publishing house that has published the works of well-known anti-Zionist publicists, including Begun and Yevseyev.

In the 1970s, a significant part of the activities of anti-Zionists and members of the "Russian Party" Valery Yemelyanov, Dmitry Zhukov, Valery Skurlatov, and A. Ivanov (Skuratov) was the promotion of a neopagan and racist worldview. These authors arrived at neopaganism through the following theoretical construct: since everything that comes from Jews is by definition negative, Christianity was also created by Jews to enslave other peoples. As a counterweight to Christianity, the authors proposed a return to the "original" religion of the ancient Slavs or Proto-Slavs, whom they considered part of the "ancient Aryans".

Semyon Reznik wrote that in 1975, Yemelyanov succeeded in having Masonic symbols removed from an exhibition dedicated to the Decembrists. Sergei Semanov, a member of the "Russian Party," noted in his diary that in 1977, Yemelyanov sent a letter to the CPSU Central Committee protesting the presence of Masonic symbols on the commemorative ruble issued, which consisted of three intersecting satellite orbits. Yemelyanov had a conversation with Mikhail Zimyanin, the Secretary for Ideology, which resulted in the withdrawal of the coins from circulation and their melting down by the Politburo of the CPSU Central Committee.

N.A. Mitrokhin considers the syllabus for the special course "Criticism of the Ideology of Zionism", prepared by Skurlatov and officially published in 1984 in a print run of 2,000 copies, as the "final document" that most fully characterizes the views of the "anti-Zionist circle". The program's theses, as in the 1965 neo-fascist "Charter of Morals," describe the ideology and mythology of Russian nationalists at this stage of their history. Most of these theses remain actively used in Russian nationalist propaganda to this day.

According to Mitrokhin, the long-term existence of an anti-Zionist group among Soviet scientists, journalists, propagandists, and internationalists was possible only if they closely collaborated with the party and state structures that determined the ideological agenda.
