= Erarta =

Museum in Saint Petersburg, Russia

Coordinates: 59.9321°N 30.2514°E

Erarta Museum of Contemporary Art

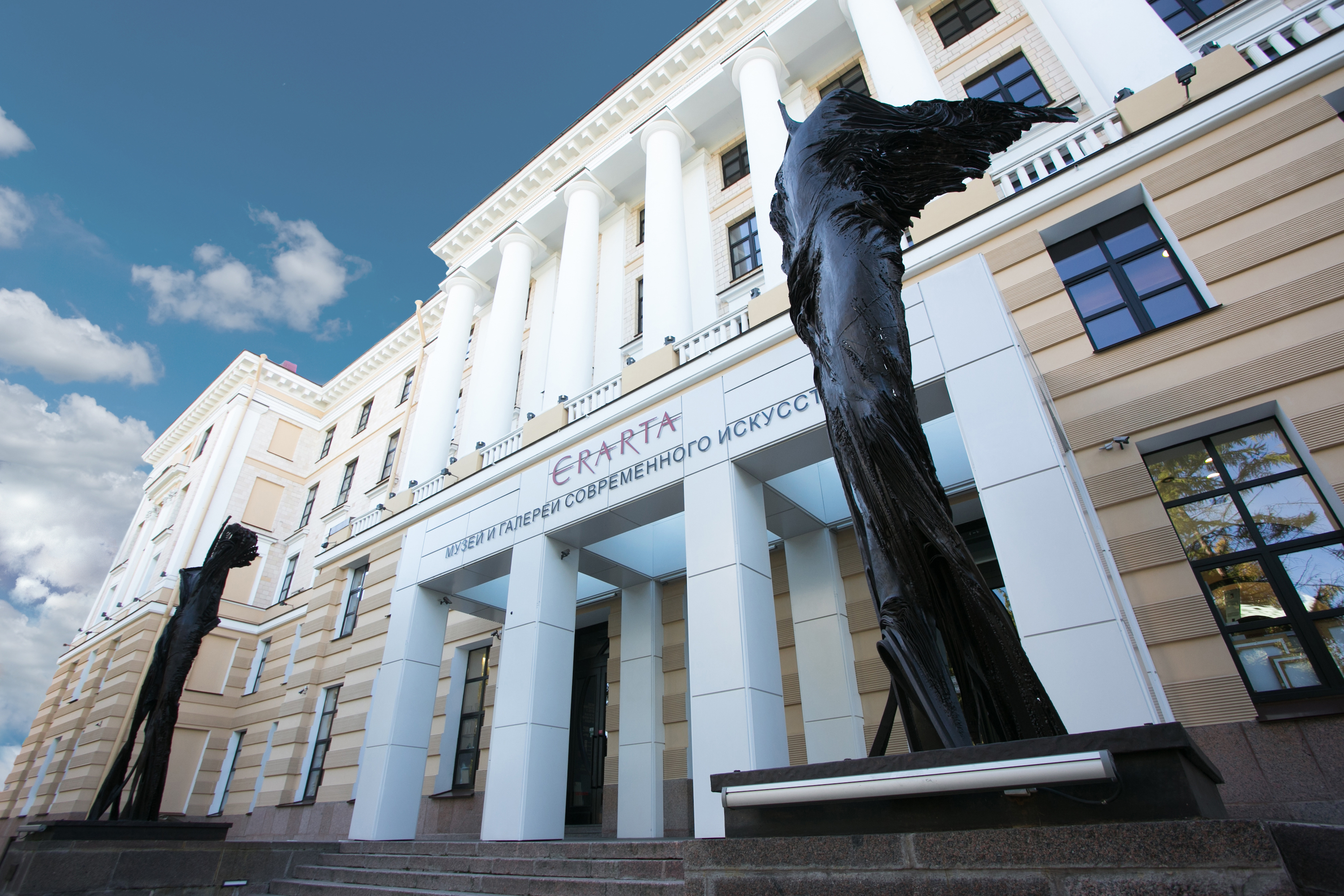
- Established: 30 September 2010; 15 years ago
- Location: 2, 29th line of Vasilyevsky Island; Saint Petersburg 199106 Russia
- Website: erarta.com

Erarta is the largest private museum of contemporary art in Russia, located in Saint Petersburg. The museum is combined with the Erarta Galleries.

The name of Erarta Museum is derived from uniting two words, "Era" and "Arta", whose combination can be translated from Russian as "the era of art".

The museum has been recognised as one of the "5 Cultural Gems" in Saint-Petersburg by National Geographic.

== Museum building ==
Erarta is housed in a five-storey building constructed in 1951 for the district committee of the Communist Party and later occupied by the Synthetic Rubber Research Institute. Two sculptures installed at the entrance to the museum, Era and Arta, were commissioned by Erarta and created by sculptor Dmitry Zhukov.

== Museum collection ==
Erarta Museum collection contains over 2,800 works, dating from the 1950s to the present and ranging from realism to abstraction and primitivism, by more than 300 artists from all across Russia. In addition to paintings, it includes drawings, prints, sculptures, installations, and video art.

On 30 June 2015, the collection of Erarta Museum of Contemporary Art became digitally available via the Google Arts & Culture Project.

== History and activities ==
Erarta Museum officially opened its doors to the public in September 2010.

The museum stages exhibitions, publishes art catalogues, organises guided tours and educational programmes, and promotes a number of signature projects.

From 2013 to 2017 Erarta Museum organised Erarta Motion Pictures, the world's only festival of short films about painting.

In 2013–2015, Erarta hosted the CROSS ART International Festival of Synthesis of Arts. The festival was open to all applicants willing to participate, as long as their projects featured a mixture of several art forms.

Erarta features several cinema halls. One of them (on floor 3) is screening Art-Animation – short animated films inspired by and developing the storyline of some paintings from the museum's collection. The second one is showing The Adventures of BB Square cartoon series (2014).

In 2024, a case was filed in a Saint Petersburg court against the museum over its display of a painting by Belarusian artist Sergei Grinevich called Festival, which has been part of its collection since 2016. The complainants alleged that the phrase “Zyvie Bielarus!” (“Long Live Belarus!”), which was inserted under the painting since 2020, violated laws against the display of "Nazi propaganda", citing its usage by pro-German Belarusian collaborationists in World War II.

== Unique projects ==
=== Russia in Erarta ===
Russia in Erarta project is aimed at promoting contemporary Russian art and establishing a cultural dialogue between Saint Petersburg and other Russian cities. The museum's curatorial team frequently travels to other parts of the country, taking the highlights of Erarta's permanent collection on travelling exhibitions and bringing back to St. Petersburg outstanding artworks from Samara, Perm, Novosibirsk, Izhevsk, Ufa, Krasnodar, Vladivostok and other cities. In turn, Erarta showcased its collection in Krasnodar, Omsk, Surgut, Khanty-Mansiysk, Kazan, Saratov, Lipetsk, Kirov, Yekaterinburg, Chelyabinsk, Veliky Novgorod, and other cities across Russia.

=== U-space ===
U-spaces are immersive installations created in collaboration with various artists, each with its particular theme and mood. During a 15-minute session, each U-Space provides a unique emotional and mental experience to a group of up to 5 visitors.

=== YOUnits ===
YOUnits on floor 3 of Erarta Museum are 50 small cubicles that can be rented for creative self-expression. YOUnits can display any media or genre: design, photography, painting, sculpture, installation or collage art.

=== The Valley of Colours ===
In 2019 Erarta Museum presented The Valley of Colours, a book for the whole family written by Erarta's founder Marina Varvarina and illustrated by the artist Nikolai Kopeikin.

== Exhibitions ==
Every year, Erarta stages around 40 temporary exhibitions of paintings, sculptures, photographs, fashion, design, and video art. The museum showcases up-and-coming talents from Russia and abroad and established stars of the global art scene.

- To mark its 5-year anniversary (2015), Erarta Museum organised the first Russian show by the Brazilian pop-art artist Romero Britto and exhibited the creations of the award–winning Irish haute couture milliner Philip Treacy.
- Year 2016 saw the exhibitions by the Soviet and Russian photojournalist Yuri Abramochkin, creator of the portrait of Yuri Gagarin, and the Brazilian photographer Sebastião Salgado, as well as the Glorious World of Fellini project, a showcase of more than 50 costumes from the Italian director's films.
- In 2017, jointly with the Victoria and Albert Museum (London, UK), Erarta presented Undressed: A Brief History of Underwear, a retrospective underwear design transformations from the 18th to the early 21st centuries. Another important exhibition was Brandrealism: A Retrospective, a solo exhibition by the musician and Leningrad band frontman Sergey Shnurov. Also in 2017 Erarta Museum completed the construction of a new exhibition space designed for displaying large-scale art objects and vehicles. The first show to be held in this venue was LAMBORGHINI: Design Legend, an exhibition of the Italian brand's rare supercars.
- In 2018, Erarta exhibited monumental bronze sculptures by the surrealist artist Salvador Dalí and artworks by the contemporary Chinese artist Liu Bolin.
- In 2021, monumental paintings by the nonconformist artist Igor Novikov were exhibited in Erarta.
- Erarta's high-profile projects in 2019 included an exhibition of photographs by the fashion photographer Mario Testino and Style Ducati, an exhibition of collectors' editions of the Italian Ducati motorcycles, as well as design concepts, photos and videos.

== Recognition ==
- In 2013, Erarta Museum of Contemporary Art was rated among the top 10 museums in Russia on TripAdvisor travel website.
- In 2015, Erarta became the first Russian museum of contemporary art to be featured on Google Arts and Culture project. Starting from 30 June 2015, artworks from Erarta's collection can be viewed online through Google Arts and Culture platform.
- In 2016, Erarta Museum received the Baltic Star International Award for its contributions to supporting culture.
- In 2018, National Geographic magazine named Erarta Museum one of the '5 cultural gems' in St. Petersburg.
- In 2018, the global art encyclopedia Oxford Art Online published an extensive article about Erarta Museum and a guide to its permanent collection.
- In 2019, the international newspaper Financial Times spotlighted Erarta Museum as 'one of the city's most exciting places'.

== Erarta Restaurant ==
Erarta Restaurant located on floor 1 of Erarta Museum features two rooms with a total seating capacity of 100 guests showcasing works by contemporary Russian artists. This à la carte establishment is particularly well known for its desserts rated as the best in St. Petersburg by both TripAdvisor and Time Out. Erarta Restaurants also creates desserts inspired by certain major exhibitions held at the museum.

== Erarta Home Stores ==
Erarta Home Stores on floor 1 of the museum's Exhibitions Wing offer signature souvenirs, books, interior décor items, prints, and original artworks. They are also available through the Erarta Shop Online Store.

== See also ==
- List of museums in Saint Petersburg
