= Erarta Galleries =

Erarta Galleries Saint Petersburg
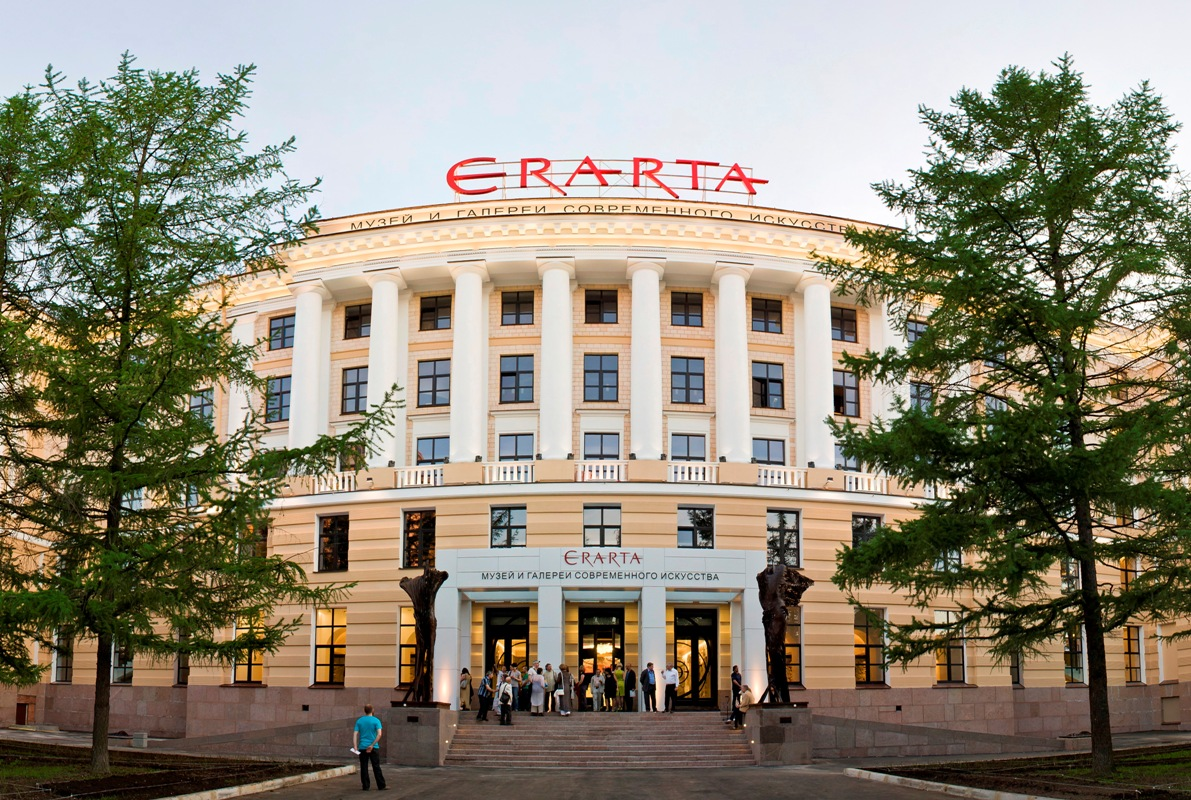
- Established: 2010
- Coordinates: 59.93°N 30.25°E
- Website: www.erartagalleries.com

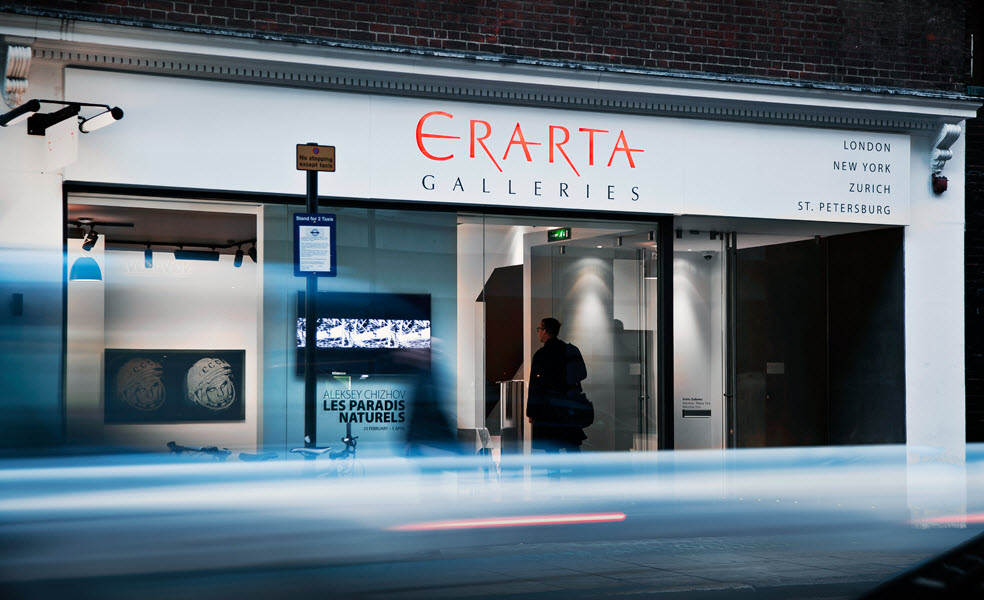
Erarta in London

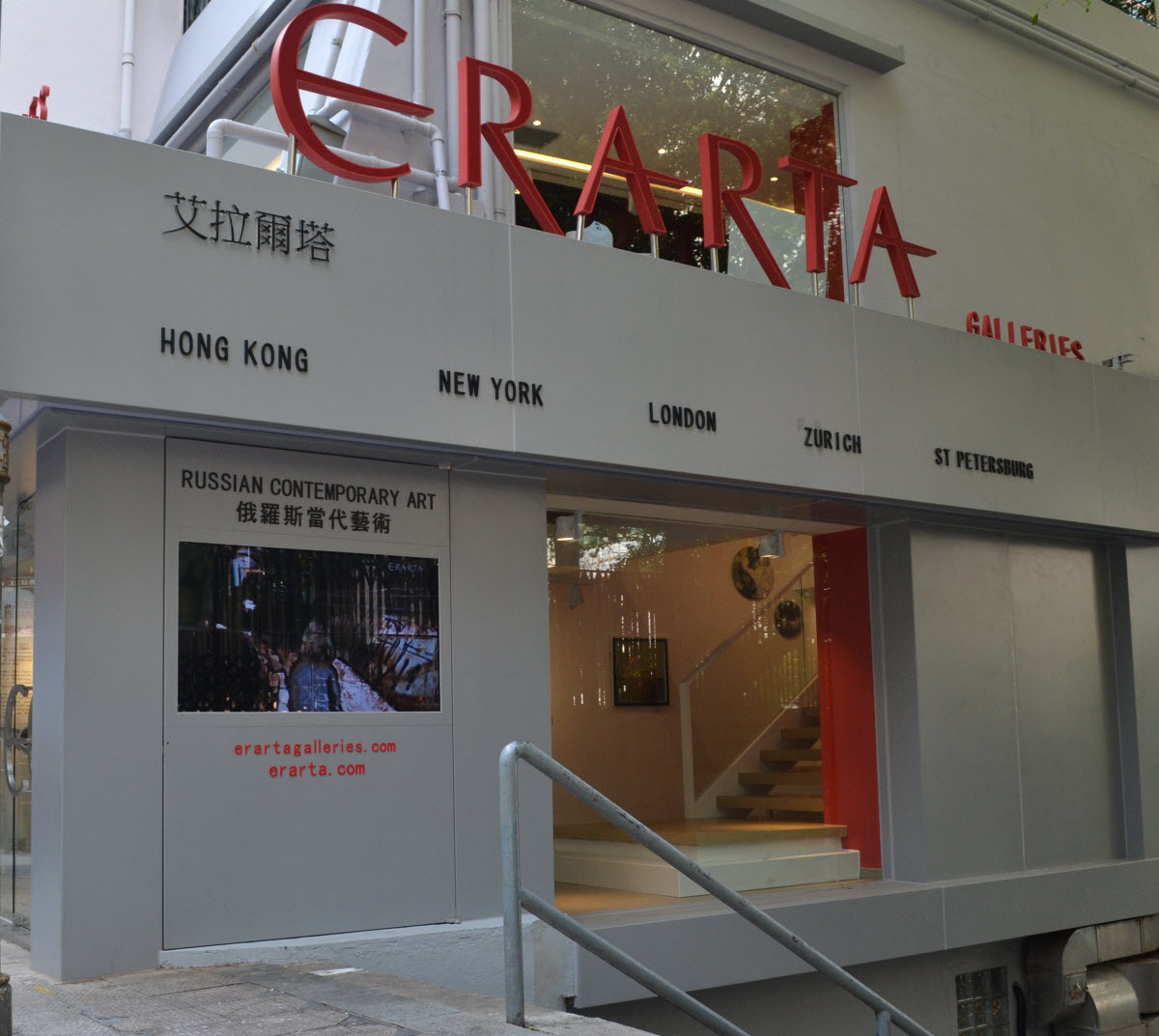
Erarta in Hong Kong

Erarta Galleries are the three galleries established in the 2010s in London (UK), Hong Kong (China) and St. Petersburg (Russia) with a goal to promote contemporary art in the corresponding country and outside its borders. The project itself is a private institution. A promotional process is based on reinvestments from sales of art pieces back into the project. In 2016, two of these galleries were closed; only the gallery in St. Petersburg survived up to now.

== Saint Petersburg ==
Erarta Galleries St. Petersburg is situated in the main building of the Erarta Museum that occupies a 10,000 sq. m building on Vasilyevsky Island. The gallery opened its doors at the same time as the Erarta Museum, in September 2010. The gallery opens a new exhibition every two months. All art pieces that are shown at the gallery are available for sale (unless they are objects that are exhibited in the museum collection).

== London ==
Erarta Galleries London was located in Mayfair. The gallery presented mainly young Russian artists to the British contemporary art scene. Erarta London was opened in 2011 in the 300 sq. m exhibition space with a group exhibition "Peter and the Wolf: Contemporary Painting" from St. Petersburg, presenting Russian artists who had already established themselves on the art scene, such as Vladimir Ovchinnikov, David Plaksin, Aleksandr Dashevsky and others. During several years the gallery showed different Russian artists who work in totally different techniques and directions: Rinat Voligamsi, Pavel Brat, Katya Krasnaya, Leonid Tishkov and others.

== Hong Kong ==
Erarta Galleries Hong Kong was located in the Central area on the Hollywood Road. The 300 sq. m two-floor exhibition space was situated opposite one of the main local attractions, the Man Mo Temple. The Hong Kong gallery was opened at 2014 to become the latest in the Erarta Galleries group. It opened its doors to visitors with a group exhibition "Game Changers" on 20 November 2014, presenting over 40 works from a capacious selection of contemporary Russian Art. Since then the gallery held several more exhibitions.
