= Vsevolod Ivanov (painter) =

Russian painter

- Всеволод Иванов
- Born: Vsevolod Borisovich Ivanov; 1950 (age 75–76); Belomorsk, Karelia, Soviet Union
- Education: Tver School of Art (Tver)
- Notable work: "Vedic Rus" series
- Movement: Rodnovery
- Website: всеволодиванов.рус

Vsevolod Borisovich Ivanov (Russian: Всеволод Борисович Иванов; born 1950) is a Russian painter, known for his "Vedic Rus" series of paintings, depicting culture of pre-Christian Russian Slavs in "fairytale fantasy" settings.

== Biography ==
Ivanov was born in 1950 in Belomorsk, Karelia, Soviet Union. He took an interest in drawing in 1965.

In the 1970s and 1980s, he worked as a graphics artist. In 1978, he graduated from the Tver School of Art in Tver.

Starting in 1988, he gradually switched his interests towards painting. His paintings were set in the themes of antiquity, the Middle Ages, churches, towers, landscapes of world and of space, and exotic animals. Since 2004, he has been creating paintings exclusively on the themes of Russian vedism, Hyperborea, and Atlantis.

He became a member of the International Federation of Artists. He was awarded a diploma for "contributions to Russian culture". In 2011, an exhibition of his works was presented at the UNESCO Headquarters in Paris, France.

== Themes ==
Ivanov's paintings contain motifs from culture and religion of pre-Christian Russian Slavs, which he mixes with elements of science fiction and fantasy. His works depict Slavs coming in contact with "gods, dragons, and other mythical creatures". His art is associated with the Rodnovery movement.

He supports the pseudohistorical conspiracy theories that the "true" history of Russian people is distorted because "the enemies of Russia removed the ancient and antique period from the history of Russia". He also claims that the medieval period and recent history of Russia have also been falsified.
