= Dezionization =

1979 book

- Author: Valery Yemelyanov
- Language: Russian, Arabic
- Genre: Political polemic
- Published: 1979
- Publisher: Al-Ba'ath newspaper (Syria)
- Publication place: Soviet Union

Dezionization (Russian: Десионизация) is a book by Soviet Arabist and author of antisemitic ideas Valery Yemelyanov, one of the early figures associated with Russian Slavic neopaganism. The work was written in the 1970s and first published in 1979 in Arabic in Syria in the newspaper Al-Ba'ath. According to researchers, its publication was supported by the Syrian authorities during the presidency of Hafez al-Assad.

Photocopied Russian-language versions of the book, described as published in Paris by the Palestine Liberation Organization, circulated in Moscow in the late 1970s.

== Overview ==
The book presents an interpretation of world history centered on a long-term struggle between different civilizations and religious traditions. Yemelyanov combines elements of Slavic neopagan beliefs, alternative interpretations of early European and Middle Eastern history, and contemporary political themes. It asserts that "a conspiracy of Zionists and Masons was thought up 3000 years ago by King Solomon with the aim of seizing power over the world by the year 2000".

A central theme of the book is the idea of an ancient Slavic-Aryan civilization, referred to as "Aryo-Veneti", which, according to the author, played a formative role in European and Asian cultural development. Yemelyanov makes extensive use of the text known as the Book of Veles and related concepts common in Slavic neopagan discourse.

Researchers note that the book also advances a theory of global historical conflict involving Zionism and Freemasonry, drawing on earlier conspiracy narratives known from Russian nationalist and émigré literature.

== Background ==
Yemelyanov was a graduate of the Institute of Oriental Languages at Moscow State University and worked as a specialist in Middle Eastern affairs, including teaching Arabic and Hebrew at the Maurice Thorez Institute. In the early 1970s, he lectured within Soviet educational and public organizations on issues related to Zionism and international politics.

He was known for giving antisemitic speeches in which he denounced Zionists and Freemasons. According to contemporary accounts, the dissemination of Yemelyanov's views attracted international attention. In 1973, U.S. Senator Jacob Javits raised concerns with the Soviet ambassador to the United States regarding the content of such lectures. Subsequently, Yemelyanov’s public lectures were curtailed.

In 1980, Yemelyanov was expelled from the Communist Party of the Soviet Union. Officially, the decision was based on a violation of party discipline related to the unauthorized publication of a book abroad.

== Reception ==
The book attracted attention among Soviet nationalist and neopagan circles and was later cited by scholars as an example of ideological trends within late Soviet nationalism. Outside the Soviet Union, Dezionization was published and analyzed in several countries as part of broader discussions on political extremism and ethnic nationalism in the USSR.

Researchers studying Russian neopaganism identify Dezionization as one of the texts that influenced the development of nationalist interpretations of Slavic pre-Christian history.

== Legal status ==
In 2008, the Meshchansky District Court of Moscow included Dezionization in the Russian Federal List of Extremist Materials (No. 970).

== See also ==
- Slavic Native Faith
- Russian nationalism

== Bibliography ==
- Klein, Lev (2004). The Resurrection of Perun. Eurasia.
- Shnirelman, Victor (2012). Russian Neo-Paganism: Nationalism and Religion.
- Mitrokhin, Nikolai (2003). The Russian Party.
- Reznik, Semyon (1991). Red and Brown.
- Vishnevskaya, Yulia (1988). "Orthodox, Gavalt!". Sintaksis.
- Korey, William (2013). Russian Antisemitism, Pamyat and the Demonology of Zionism. Taylor & Francis. ISBN 9781134367665.
