= Dmitry Zhukov =

Russian sculptor (born 1972)

- Дмитрий Александрович Жуков
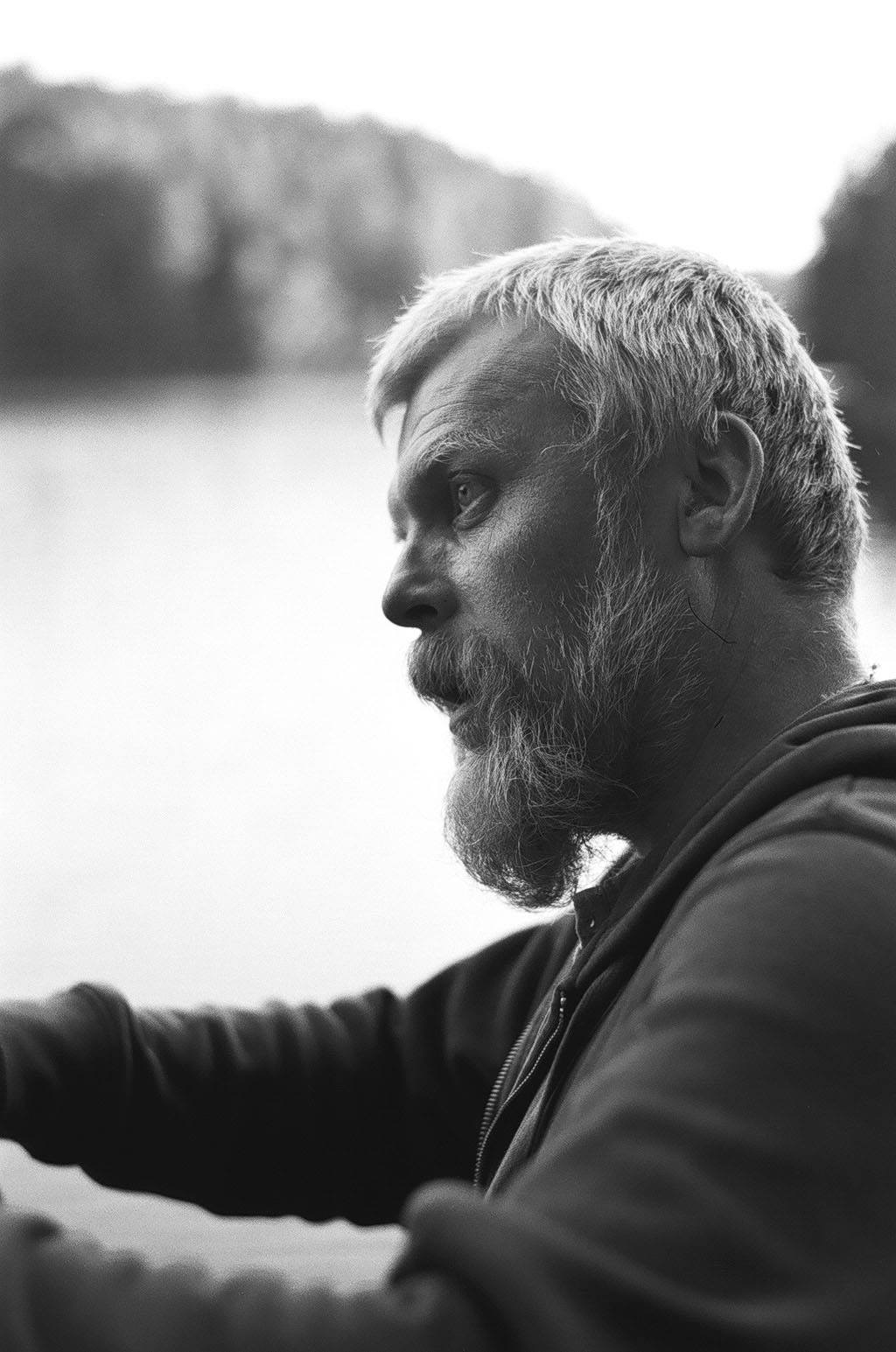
- Born: 15 January 1972 (age 54); Azov, Russia
- Education: Saint Petersburg Art and Industry Academy
- Known for: Sculpture, installation art
- Style: Forging
- Website: zhukov-sculpture.com

Dmitry Zhukov (Russian: Дмитрий Александрович Жуков, 15 January 1972 in Azov, Rostov Oblast, USSR) is a Russian sculptor, known for monumental metal works made in the technique of forging, a member of the Russian Artists' Union.

== Biography ==
Dmitry Zhukov was born in Azov in 1972, but his artistic career took place in St. Petersburg. In the early 2000s he entered the department of artistic metal processing of Saint Petersburg Art and Industry Academy, participated in exhibitions of the Union of Artists of Russia since 2003. After graduating in 2007 Zhukov received a government grant ‘Muse of St. Petersburg’ and in 2008 held his first solo exhibition in the gallery ‘ART re.FLEX‘, which was warmly received by critics, and the following year Zhukov joined the Union of Artists. In 2006-2008 he was teaching at the Department of drawing at St. Petersburg State Art and Industry Academy, his alma mater.

Zhukov lives and works in the ecovillage Nevo-Ecovil, located 20 kilometers off the city of Sortavala and is formally a part of the village Reuskula.

== Art ==
Talking about his work in an interview for the magazine ‘World of Metal’, Zhukov pointed out that he found his own style in ‘plastic of stripe’ – the works are made of molded stripes of Damascus steel, drifted, deep-etched and blued. In his review of the first solo exhibition of the sculptor, titled "Striped Space", Sergei Pavlov from the Department of Sculpture of the State Russian Museum, noted Zhukov's transition from signification in the works of 2005–2007 years (studies of magic, myths and legends) to more abstract forms in subsequent works.

I have been brewing Damascus steel for a long time. We were required to make the surface smooth, without any crack. But I always liked cracks and the unevenness of it.

— Dmitry Zhukov, about his artistic method

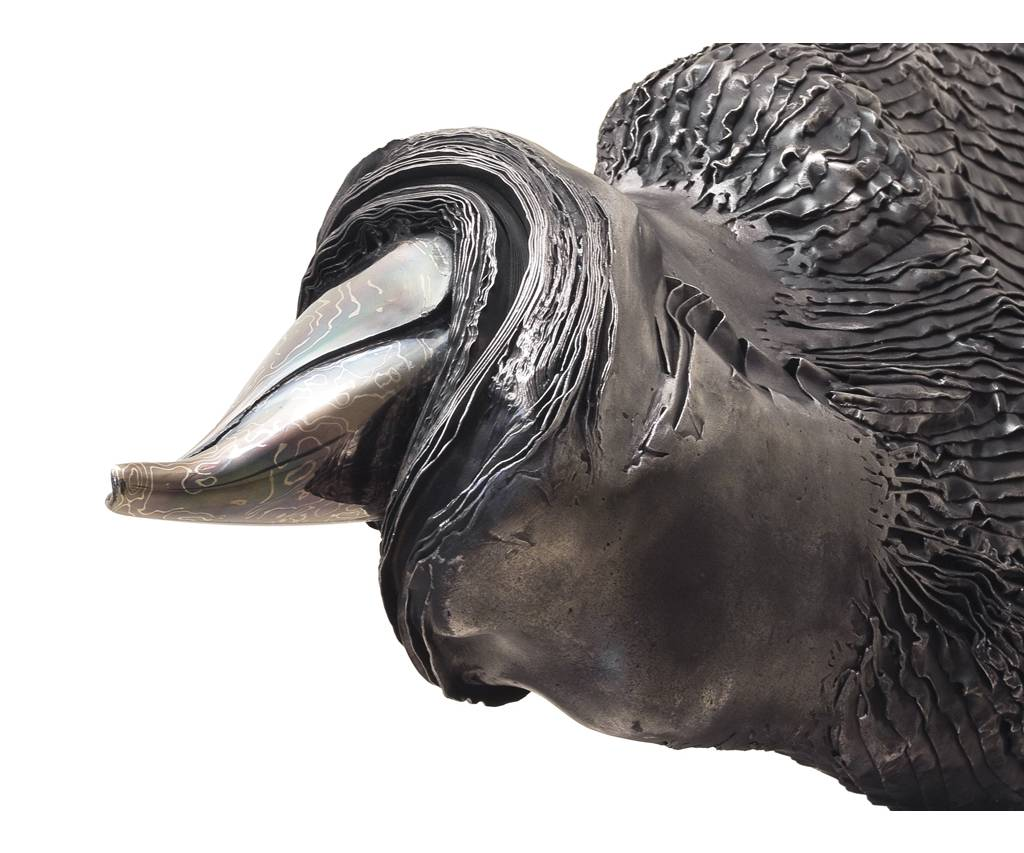
Black nymph. Steel, forging, 2008.

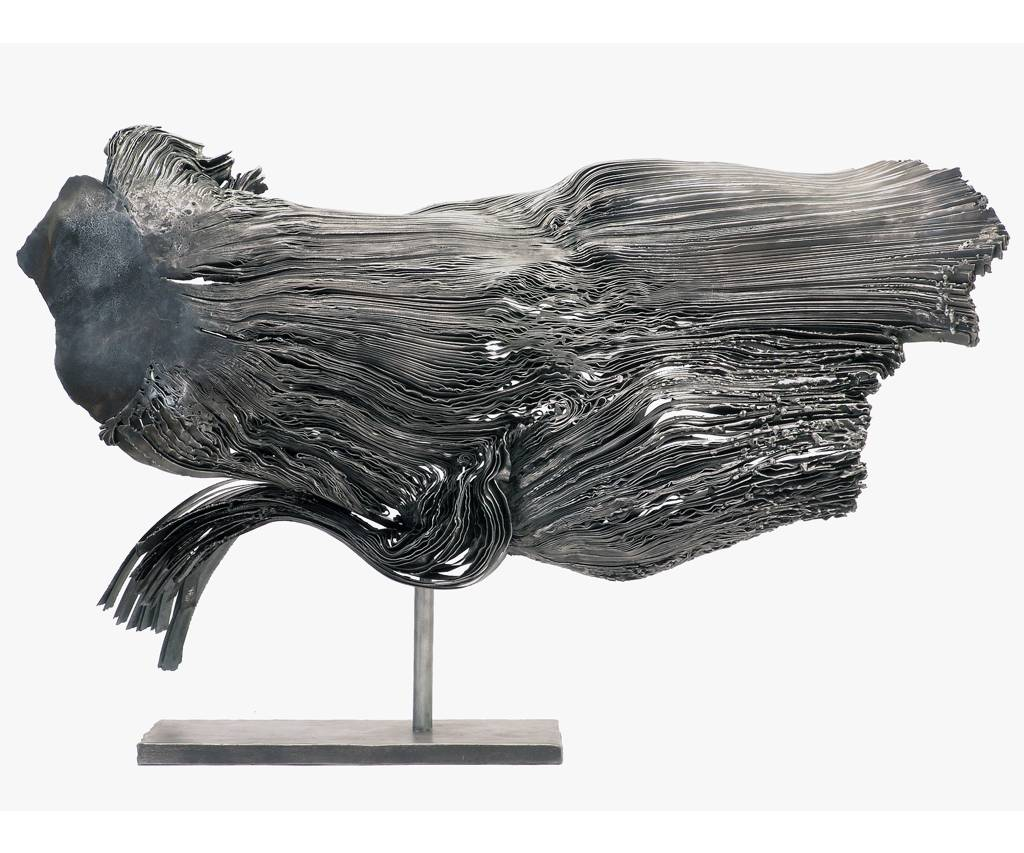
Return of Aphrodite. Steel, forging, 106 x 60 cm, 2006.

In addition to the personal exhibition of sculptor in 2008, the gallery ‘ART re.FLEX‘ presented his and the artist Andrey Gorbunov's joint project ‘DNA’, in which Zhukov presented a series of ‘Phases of unzipping DNA’ – a creative interpretation of natural processes of mutation and genetic modification. As the sculptor said, ‘growing’ the works of metal stripes, he tried to convey the process of creating some symbols and codes of the living matter, which are not always clear to an outside observer.

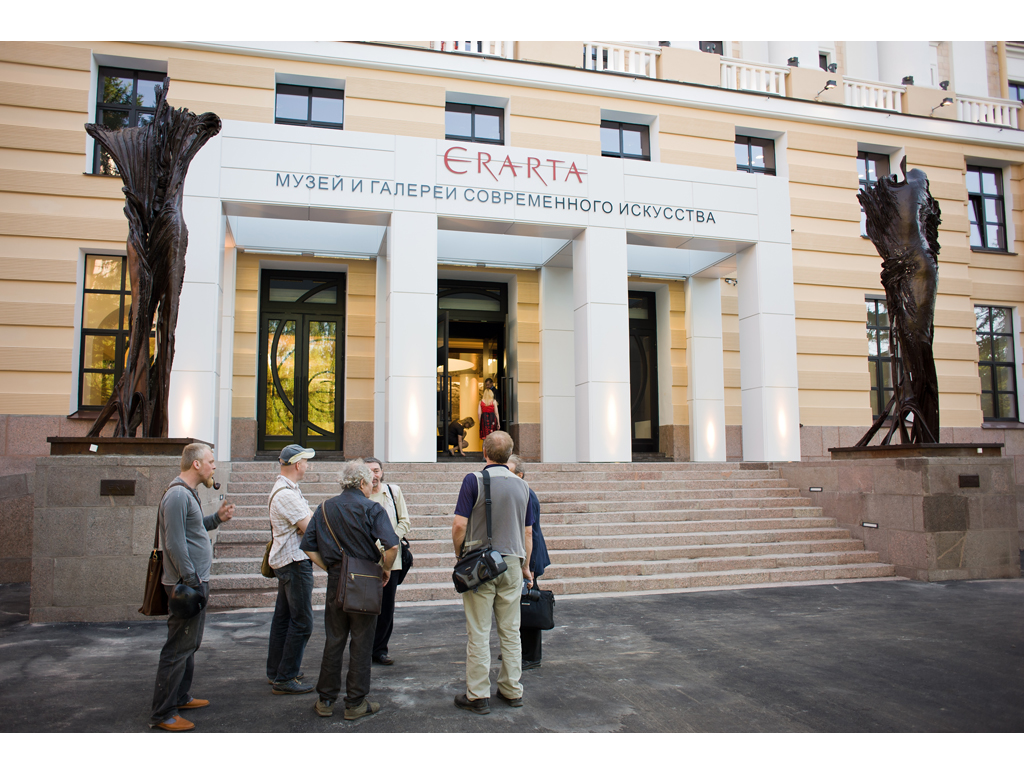
Figures Dawn and Art near the Erarta Museum. Steel, forging, 2009.

For the opening of Erarta Museum of Modern Art Zhukov created two five-meter high figures – ‘Dawn’ and ‘Art’, they were installed on the stylobate of the museum building. Allegorical sculptures in which art critic Michael Zolotonosov saw a reference to the Nike of Samothrace, are intended to symbolize the era of art. Two more abstract objects by Zhukov were placed in front of the porch of the museum.

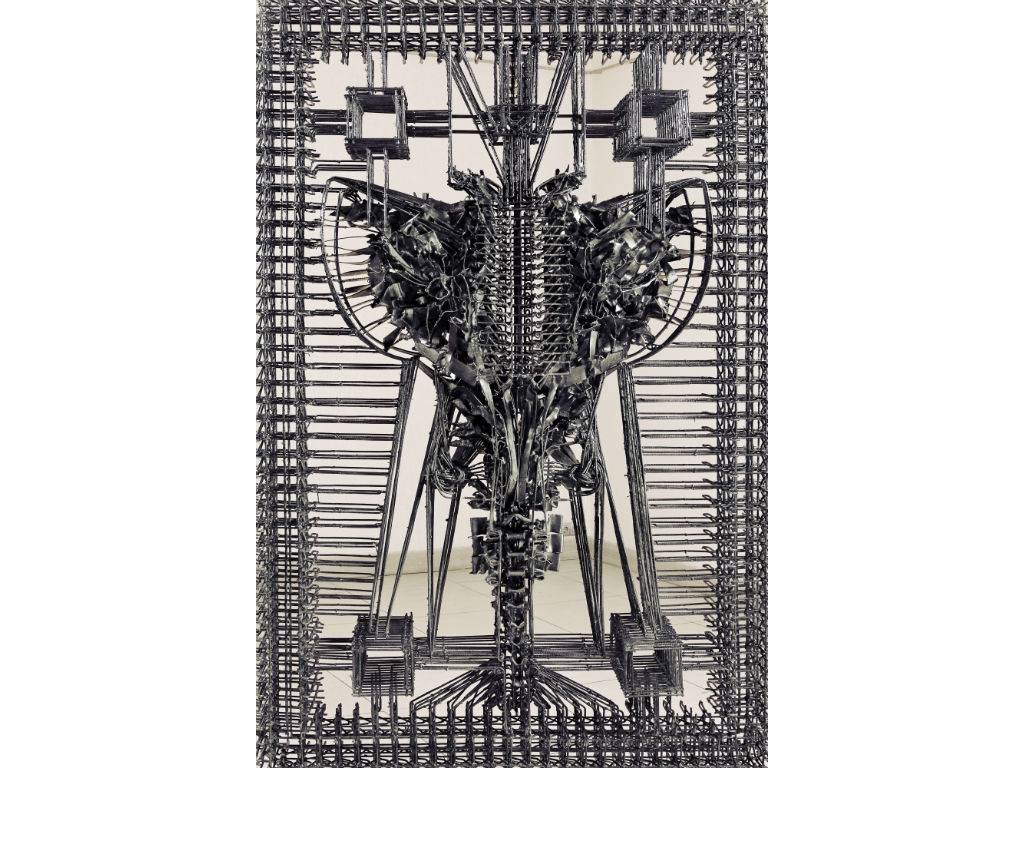
Taurus. Steel, forging, 2014.

In late 2014 at ART re.FLEX Zhukov introduced the exhibition project ‘For Internal Use’, deliberately devoid of accompanying text of curator, which could interfere with the internal perception of the viewer. The object ‘No name’, which was a part of this project, then participated in numerous group exhibitions, including NordArt festival in Büdelsdorf, Germany. In August 2015, Zhukov as well as ten artists-innovators took part in a special project of 6th Moscow Biennale ‘Panopticon’ with a new series ‘Russian Lace’ – the study of the semantics of archaic pagan symbols, which resulted in fundamental objects of barbed wire. In 2016 ‘No name’ and ‘Russian Lace’ were presented at ’Steambaroque’ exhibition in the large exhibition hall of Stables housing at the Kirov Central Park. In summer of 2016 it became known that ‘Russian Lace’ series would become part of the Russian sculpture park at the hotel ‘Château Gütsch‘ in Lucerne, which is owned by Alexander Lebedev.

For the festival ‘Archstoyanie – 2016’, which is traditionally held in the Art Park Nikola-Lenivets in the Kaluga region, Zhukov created the sculpture ‘Personal Universe Number 5’ – a metal ‘cocoon’ which weighs 1.5 tons and has room for up to 2 people, conveys the idea of asylum, suggested by the festival curators. Work on the project went on for over 6 months in Zhukov studio in Karelia. To create a multi-layered, tied in a knot form, its elements were first connected by diffusion welding, and then were heated to 1200 °C, forged and stratified by different instruments.

In 2016 one of the works of ‘Steambaroque / Soaring Baroque’ project entered the contemporary art collection of the Russian Museum, and was placed in the courtyard of the Marble Palace.

=== Major exhibitions and expositions ===
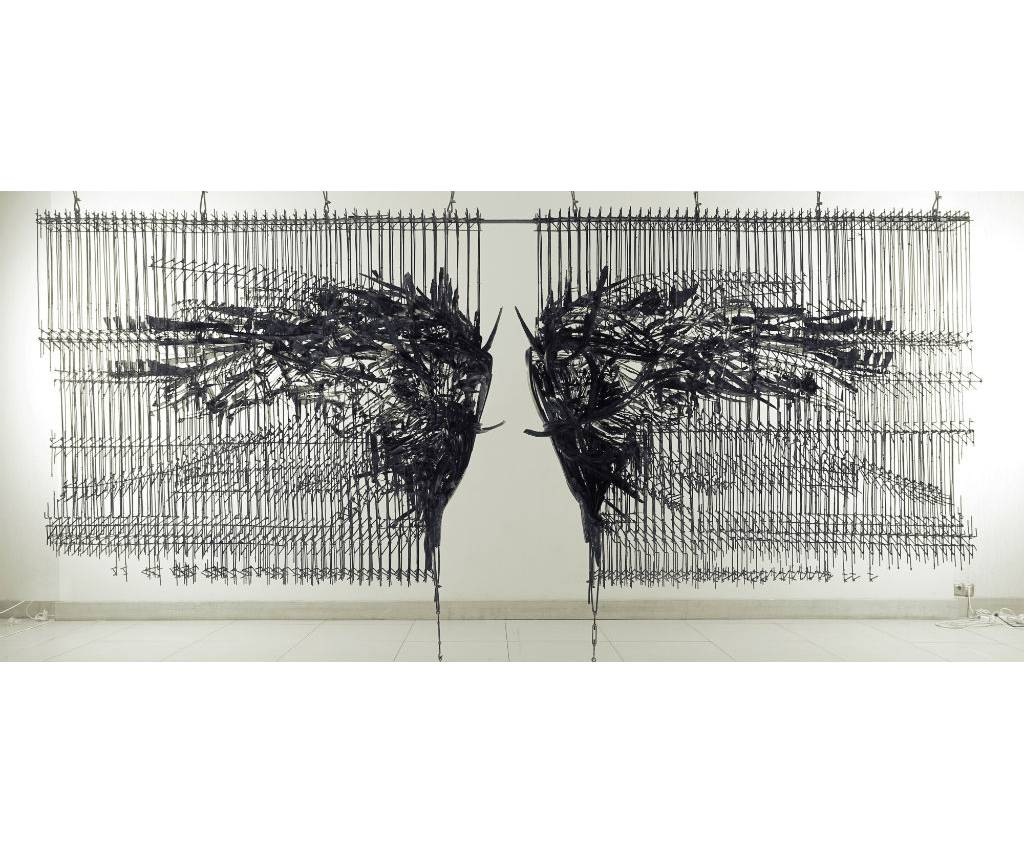
No name. Steel, forging, 2014.

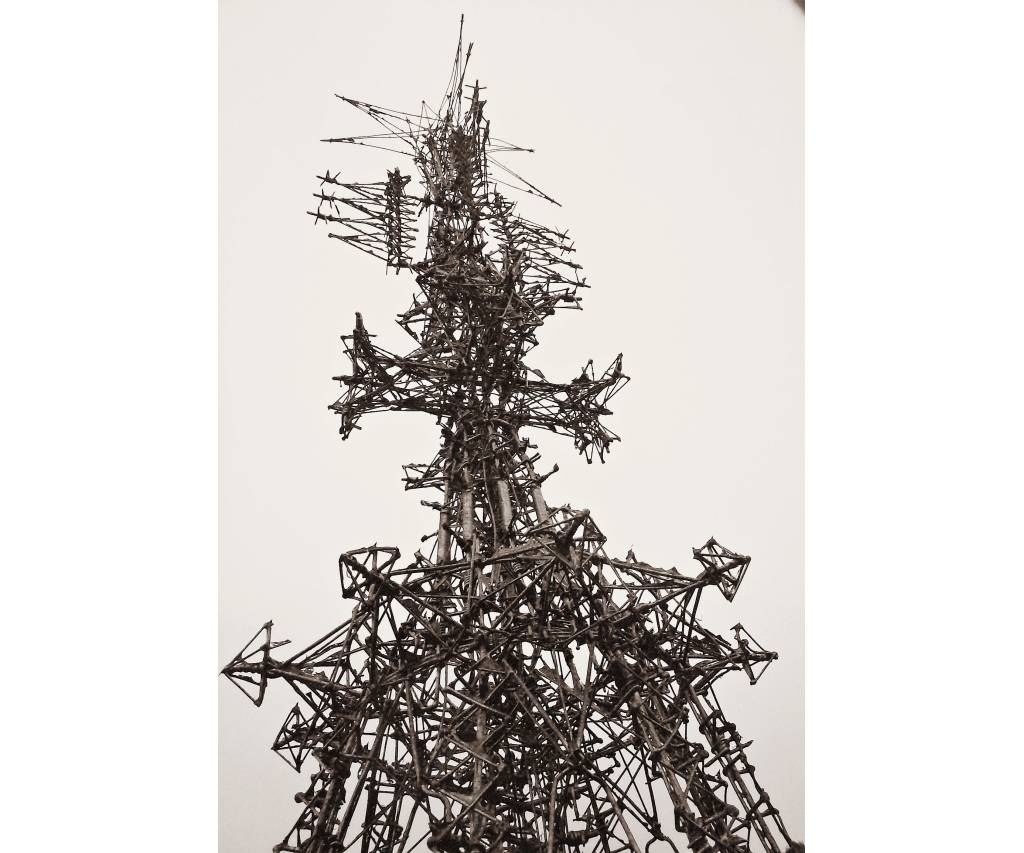
Russian laces. Barbed wire, 2015.

- 2016 — the exhibition ‘Reverse’, Center for Contemporary Art M’ARS, Moscow.
- 2016 — ‘ArtHelsinki 2016‘, Helsinki, Finland
- 2016 — ‘Simple names, selected synonyms’, Parallel Programme V Moscow International Biennale for Young Art, the Botanical Garden of Moscow State University
- 2016 — the project ‘Personal Universe Number 5’ for the XI International Festival of landscape objects ‘Archstoyanie’
- 2016 — ‘Steambaroque / soaring Baroque’, the joint exhibition of Dmitry Zhukov and Vlad Kulkov, the Kirov Central Park, St. Petersburg
- 2015 — ‘Panopticon’, the special project for the VI Moscow Biennale of Contemporary Art
- 2015 — ‘Crypt’, the group exhibition at the St. Petersburg Philarmonia, curator - Vlad Kul'kov
- 2015 — Nord Art 2015, Büdelsdorf, Germany
- 2015 — Workshop of Anikushin, a branch of the State Museum of City Sculpture, St. Petersburg
- 2014 — Personal exhibition ‘For internal use’, gallery ART re.FLEX, St. Petersburg
- 2011 — ‘ArtHelsinki 2011‘, Helsinki, Finland
- 2011 — the exhibition at the State Russian Museum "Movement. Form. Dance"
- 2010 — the project ‘Dysfashional’, Garage Museum of Contemporary Art, Moscow
- 2010 — ‘NordArt 2010‘, Büdelsdorf, Germany
- 2009—2010 — the project for the Museum of Modern Art Erarta, St. Petersburg
- 2009 — the project ‘GiperUvelichenie’, Library of Mayakovsky, St. Petersburg
- 2008 — joint exhibition of ‘DNA’ (sculpture and painting D. Zhukov, Gorbunov), gallery ART re.FLEX, St. Petersburg
- 2008 — the first personal exhibition of ‘P. P.’, Gallery ART re.FLEX, St. Petersburg
- 2007 — '‘Dialogues’, Saint Petersburg Manege
- 2007 — ‘Workshop 2007’, Museum of Contemporary Art, Moscow
- 2007 — Youth Exhibition at the Central House of Artists, Moscow
- 2006 — the exhibition ‘Epigraph’, gallery ART re.FLEX, St. Petersburg
- 2006 — ‘First Session of Young Art’, State Museum of City Sculpture, St. Petersburg
- 2004 — ‘The Ark’, Saint Petersburg Manege
- 2003—2005 — Exhibition of the Union of Artists, St. Petersburg

=== Works in collections ===
Zhukov works are presented in collections of the State Russian Museum, the Erarta Museum and at the festival ‘Archstoyanie’ in art park Nikola-Lenivets. Sculptures also acquired by private collectors from Russia, Germany, Argentina, Switzerland and the United States.

== Links ==
- Dmitry Zhukov's personal website
