= Slavic-Hill Rodnovery =

Russian branch of Rodnovery

Slavic-Hill Rodnovery (Russian: Славяно-Горицкое Родноверие) is one of the earliest branches of Rodnovery (Slavic Native Faith) that emerged in Russia in the 1980s founded by Aleksandr Konstantinovich Belov (1957–), and one of the largest Rodnover movements in terms of number of practitioners, counted in the many tens of thousands. The movement is characterised by a military orientation, combining Rodnover worldview with the practice of a martial arts style known as "Slavic-hill wrestling" (Славяно-горицкая борьба, Slavyano-goritskaya bor'ba). The locution "Slavic hill" refers to the kurgan, Indo-European warrior mound burials of the Pontic–Caspian steppe.

== History ==
The founder of the Slavic-Hill tradition of Rodnovery, Aleksandr Konstantinovich Belov (also Alex Beloff; Rodnover name: Selidor), was originally a Karate master, and in the 1970s and 1980s he began researching and reviving ancient Slavic martial techniques mixing them with elements of English catch wrestling and other styles, codifying the practice in the book Slavic-Hill Wrestling and popularising it by founding, in 1986, the group of the Descendants of Svarog (Сварожичей-Триверов, Svarozhychey-Tryverov), which in 1989 took part in the creation of the Moscow Slavic Pagan Community; in 1995 Belov left the group and the following year he established the Russian Federation of Slavic-Hill Wrestling, which was officially registered by the state in 2015 as the Association of Slavic-Hill Wrestling Fighters (Ассоциация Бойцов Славяно-Горицкой Борьбы).

The original federation of Belov splintered many times over the years giving rise to other distinct groups of military Rodnovery; Belov, however, continued to remain a central figure for the movement as a whole. Outside of Russia, the movement has communities in Belarus, Bulgaria and Ukraine, and as a sport it is practised in other countries too. Together with a narrow circle of believers, Belov also experiments with an "inner energy" style of fighting based on folk magic.

== Doctrine ==
Rather than as a "religion", Belov characterises the movement of Slavic-Hill Rodnovery as a man's "assimilation to the law of the universe", expressed in images and worship practices. The theology of Slavic-Hill Rodnovery is pantheistic and polytheistic, and the movement's military orientation is reflected in its pantheon, which gives prominence to military deities headed by Perun, identified as the ruler of the universe. The liturgy is extremely simplified and the god of warriors, the thunderer, is worshipped through war totems (the animals falcon, kite, bear, wolf and lynx).

The adherents believe that the class of the warriors should have the superior and leading role in society (espousing the idea of a military state and rejecting communism and democracy), and should be always ready to sacrifice themselves for the community. The movement abhors moral decay, while emphasising discipline and conservative values, and even though Belov's early works do not have a radical right-wing posture, many adherents espouse such position.

== See also ==
- Peterburgian Vedism
- Rodnovery
- Russian martial arts
