= Semyon Reznik =

Russian writer (born 1938)

Semyon Efimovich Reznik (Russian: Семён Ефимович Резник) (born 13 June 1938, in Moscow) is a Russian writer, journalist, man of letters and historian, noted in particular for his study of the blood libel and the resurgence of Neonazism in Russia. He was the longtime editor of the important Soviet era biographical book series "Lives of Remarkable People" ("ЖЗЛ") to which he also contributed several items as an author.

He emigrated to the United States in 1982, where he became a radio personality and a writer for the Russian desk of the Voice of America. He is a member of the International PEN Club; member of the Union of Writers of Moscow.

In 2016 he wrote an open letter to Aaron Sorkin in which he expressed his support for Donald Trump, called Sorkin “talkative underwit” and “shameless demagogue” and suggested that he leaves the United States, because “it will improve the environment”, “the air will become cleaner”. During the next few years he published a few more articles in support of Donald Trump in one of which he called the “Black lives matter” slogan “soapbox” and Kamala Harris — “sky-blue black”.

== List of publications ==
- Николай Вавилов. М., «Молодая гвардия» (серия ЖЗЛ), 1968.
- Мечников. М., «Молодая гвардия» (серия ЖЗЛ), 1973.
- Владимир Ковалевский. Трагедия нигилиста. «Молодая гвардия» (серия ЖЗЛ), 1978.
- Раскрывшаяся тайна бытия. Эволюция и эволюционисты. М., «Знание», 1976.
- Четвертое измерение мира. Moscow, «Знание», 1977.
- Завещание Гавриила Зайцева. Moscow, «Детская литература», 1981.
- Лицом к человеку. Подступы к биографии В.В. Парина. Moscow, «Знание», 1981.
- Дорога на эшафот. Paris-New York, «Третья волна», 1982.
- Хаим-да-Марья. Историко-документальная фантасмагория. Washington, «Вызов», 1986.
- Кровавая карусель. Две исторические повести. Washington, «Вызов», 1988.
- Кровавая карусель. Moscow, ПИК, 1991.
- Красное и Коричневое. Книга о советском нацизме. Washington, «Вызов», 1991.
- The Nazification of Russia. Washington, "Challenge Publication", 1996.
- Растление ненавистью. Кровавый навет в России. Историко-документальные очерки о прошлом и настоящем. Moscow-Jerusalem, Даат/Знание, 2001.
- Вместе или врозь? Заметки на полях книги А.И. Солженицына "Двести лет вместе". Moscow, «Захаров», 2003.
- «Выбранные места из переписки с друзьями. Часть 1». «Мосты» (Журнал литературы, искусства, науки и общественно-политической мысли), 2004 № 3, стр. 146-230.
