= 2025 Miami Beach mayoral election =

Local election in Florida

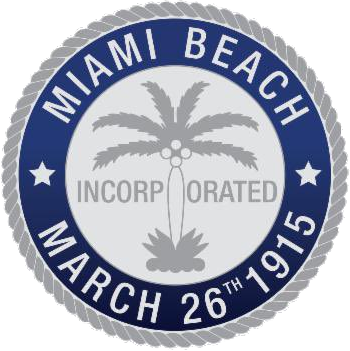
- November 4, 2025
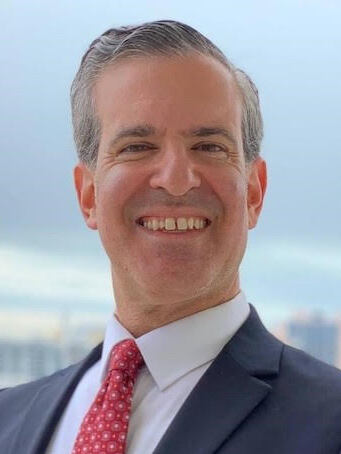

Candidate	Steven Meiner	Kristen Rosen Gonzalez
Party	Nonpartisan	Nonpartisan
Popular vote	7,636	7,278
Percentage	51.2%	48.8%
Mayor before election
Steven Meiner
Elected mayor
Steven Meiner

The 2025 Miami Beach mayoral election was held on November 4, 2025, to elect the mayor of Miami Beach, Florida. Incumbent mayor Steven Meiner was re-elected to a second consecutive term.

== Candidates ==
=== Declared ===
- Kristen Rosen Gonzalez, city commissioner
- Steven Meiner, incumbent mayor

== Endorsements ==
Steven Meiner

Local officials

- Francis Suarez, mayor of Miami (2017–present)
- David Suarez, city commissioner of Miami Beach (2023–present)

Labor unions

- Fraternal Order of Police Miami Beach
Kristen Rosen Gonzalez

Local officials

- Matti Herrera Bower, former mayor of Miami Beach (2007–2013)

Labor unions

- American Federation of State, County and Municipal Employees Florida
- UNITE HERE Local 355

Organizations

- SAVE Action Fund

Newspapers

- Miami Herald

Political parties

- Miami-Dade Democratic Party
- Florida Democratic Party

== Polling ==
Poll source	Date(s) administered	Sample size (Note: Key: A – all adults RV – registered voters LV – likely voters V – unclear)	Margin of error	Steven Meiner	Kristen Rosen Gonzalez	Undecided
MDW Communications (Note: Poll conducted before Meiner had announced he would seek re-election)	May 19–26, 2025	402 (LV)	± 4.0%	29%	35%	36%

== Results ==
2025 Miami Beach mayoral election
Candidate	Votes	%
Steven Meiner (incumbent)	7,636	51.20
Kristen Rosen Gonzalez	7,278	48.80
Total votes	14,914	100.00
