= 2013 Miami Beach mayoral election =

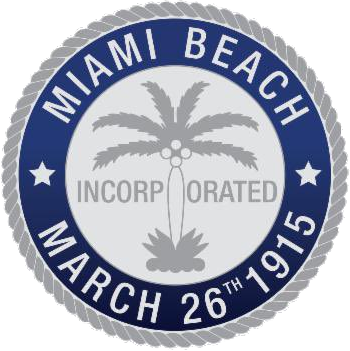
- November 5, 2013
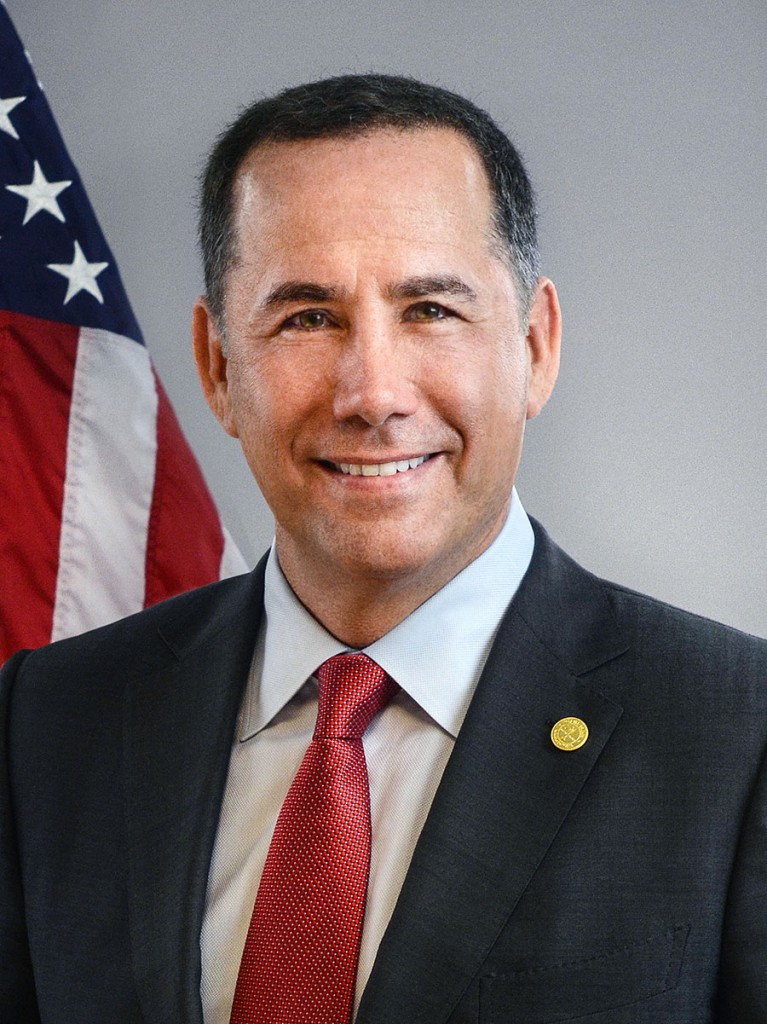

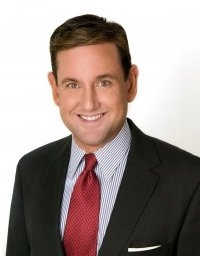

Nominee	Philip Levine	Michael Góngora	Steve Berke
Party	Democratic	Democratic	After Party
Popular vote	5,643	4,071	1,355
Percentage	50.49%	36.43%	12.12%
Mayor before election
Matti Herrera Bower
Democratic
Elected mayor
Philip Levine
Democratic

The 2013 Miami Beach mayoral election took place on November 5, 2013, to elect the mayor of Miami Beach, Florida. The election was held concurrently with various other local elections, and was officially nonpartisan. Philip Levine secured election with over 50% of the vote, avoiding a runoff.
