= List of covers of Time magazine (1940s) =

This is a list of people and other topics appearing on the cover of Time magazine in the 1940s. Time was first published in 1923. As Time became established as one of the United States' leading news magazines, an appearance on the cover of Time became an indicator of a person's notability, fame or notoriety. Such features were accompanied by articles.

For other decades, see Lists of covers of Time magazine.

== 1940 ==
- January 1 – Joseph Stalin, Man of the Year
- January 8 – Cordell Hull
- January 15 – Viscount Halifax
- January 22 – Lauritz Melchior
- January 29 – Robert A. Taft
- February 5 – Baron Mannerheim
- February 12 – Ève Curie
- February 19 – John H. Levi
- February 26 – Thomas E. Dewey
- March 4 – Mitsumasa Yonai
- March 11 – Jerome Frank
- March 18 – Mickey Rooney
- March 25 – Éamon de Valera
- April 1 – Hermann Göring
- April 8 – Benito Mussolini
- April 15 – Burton K. Wheeler
- April 22 – Dudley Pound
- April 29 – King Gustaf V and Crown Prince Gustaf Adolf
- May 6 – Joseph N. Pew Jr.
- May 13 – Nikolaus von Falkenhorst
- May 20 – King Leopold III
- May 27 – Arthur Barratt and Patrick Playfair
- June 3 – Maxime Weygand
- June 10 – Franklin D. Roosevelt
- June 17 – Paul Reynaud with Maxime Weygand, Paul Baudouin and Philippe Pétain
- June 24 – Benito Mussolini and Pietro Badoglio
- July 1 – Admiral Richardson
- July 8 – Philip Henry Kerr
- July 15 – Vyacheslav Molotov
- July 22 – Fumimaro Konoe
- July 29 – George Marshall
- August 5 – Sir Alan F. Brooke
- August 12 – Getúlio Vargas
- August 19 – William Allen White
- August 26 – Erhard Milch
- September 2 – Earl of Athlone and his wife Princess Alice
- September 9 – Joe Martin
- September 16 – Baron Beaverbrook
- September 23 – Henry A. Wallace
- September 30 – Winston Churchill
- October 7 – William S. Knudsen
- October 14 – Archibald Wavell, 1st Earl Wavell
- October 21 – Wendell Willkie
- October 28 – Ethel Merman
- November 4 – King George II
- November 11 – Thomas Holcomb
- November 18 – Leopold Stokowski
- November 25 – Kenneth Roberts
- December 2 – Sidney Hillman
- December 9 – Manuel Ávila Camacho
- December 16 – Alexander Papagos
- December 23 – Martin Niemöller
- December 30 – Lily Pons

== 1941 ==
- January 6 – Winston Churchill, Man of the Year
- January 13 – Jesse Jones
- January 20 – King Boris III
- January 27 – Philip Murray
- February 3 – Gertrude Lawrence
- February 10 – Anton J. Carlson
- February 17 – Andrew Cunningham
- February 24 – Donald M. Nelson
- March 3 – Gary Cooper
- March 10 – Gaston Henry-Haye
- March 17 – Henry Ford
- March 24 – Wilhelm List
- March 31 – Emory Scott Land
- April 7 – Bing Crosby
- April 14 – Adolf Hitler
- April 21 – Dušan Simović
- April 28 – Sir Percy Noble
- May 5 – Ramon S. Castillo
- May 12 – Leon Henderson
- May 19 – İsmet İnönü
- May 26 – François Darlan
- Jun 2 - Ernest King
- Jun 9 - Benito Mussolini
- June 16 – Chen Cheng
- June 23 – Jack Towers
- June 30 – Semyon Timoshenko
- July 7 – Yosuke Matsuoka
- July 14 – Wilhelm Keitel
- July 21 – Claude Wickard
- July 28 – Sir Charles Portal
- August 4 – Charles de Gaulle
- August 11 – Sumner Welles
- August 18 – Hubertus J. van Mook
- August 25 – Henry L. Stimson
- September 1 – Frank Maxwell Andrews
- September 8 – Reza Shah Pahlavi
- September 15 – Harold L. Ickes
- September 22 – Kichisaburō Nomura
- September 29 – Joe Louis
- October 6 – Robert E. Wood
- October 13 – Semyon Budyonny
- October 20 – Frederick Bowhill
- October 27 – Joseph Stalin
- November 3 – Hideki Tōjō
- November 10 – Rita Hayworth
- November 17 – Reuben Fleet
- November 24 – Thomas C. Hart
- December 1 – Sir Claude Auchinleck
- December 8 – Fedor von Bock
- December 15 – Husband E. Kimmel
- December 22 – Isoroku Yamamoto
- December 29 – Douglas MacArthur

== 1942 ==
- January 5 – Franklin D. Roosevelt, Man of the Year
- January 12 – Henry Royds Pownall
- January 19 – Oswaldo Aranha
- January 26 – Hein ter Poorten
- February 2 – Karl Dönitz
- February 9 – Robert A. Lovett
- February 16 – Boris Shaposhnikov
- February 23 – Reinhard Heydrich
- March 2 – Tomoyuki Yamashita
- March 9 – Conrad Emil Lambert Helfrich
- March 16 – Lord Linlithgow
- March 23 – Henry Ford
- March 30 – Douglas MacArthur
- April 6 – Ezequiel Padilla
- April 13 – Sir Stafford Cripps
- April 20 – Erich Raeder
- April 27 – Pierre Laval
- May 4 – Lewis H. Brereton
- May 11 – Maxim Litvinoff
- May 18 – Chester Nimitz
- May 25 – Draža Mihailović
- June 1 – Chiang Kai-shek
- June 8 – Lord Louis Mountbatten
- June 15 – Brehon B. Somervell
- June 22 – Henry 'Hap' Arnold
- June 29 – Franz Halder
- July 6 – Flag of the United States
- July 13 – Erwin Rommel
- July 20 – Dmitri Shostakovich
- July 27 – Semyon Timoshenko
- August 3 – Seishirō Itagaki
- August 10 – General McNaughton
- August 17 – Robert L. Ghormley
- August 24 – Jawaharlal Nehru
- August 31 – Gerd von Rundstedt
- September 7 – Frank Knox
- September 14 – Harold Alexander
- September 21 – Fedor von Bock
- September 28 – William Francis Gibbs
- October 5 – Paul V. McNutt
- October 12 – Edward J. Flynn
- October 19 – George C. Marshall
- October 26 – Viscount Gort
- November 2 – General Vandegrift
- November 9 – Sir Arthur Tedder
- November 16 – Dwight D. Eisenhower
- November 23 – James H. Doolittle
- November 30 – William Halsey Jr.
- December 7 – Ernest J. King
- December 14 – Georgy Zhukov
- December 21 – Katharine Cornell, Judith Anderson and Ruth Gordon
- December 28 – Lesley J. McNair

== 1943 ==
- January 4 – Joseph Stalin, Man of the Year
- January 11 – James F. Byrnes
- January 18 – George Kenney
- January 25 – Henry Morgenthau Jr.
- February 1 – Bernard Montgomery
- February 8 – Anthony Eden
- February 15 – Osami Nagano
- February 22 – Filipp Golikov
- March 1 – Madame Chiang Kai-shek
- March 8 – Harry S. Truman
- March 15 – Elmer Davis
- March 22 – Carl Andrew Spaatz
- March 29 – Henri Giraud
- April 5 – Sir Thomas Beecham
- April 12 – George S. Patton
- April 19 – Manuel Ávila Camacho
- April 26 – John W. Bricker
- May 3 – Kenneth Anderson
- May 10 – Karl Dönitz
- May 17 – Harold Lee George
- May 24 – Sir Andrew Cunningham
- May 31 – Gustaf VI Adolf
- June 7 – Sir Arthur Harris
- June 14 – Harold D. Smith
- June 21 – Benito Mussolini
- June 28 – Bernard Baruch
- July 5 – Aleksandr Vasilevsky
- July 12 – Şükrü Saracoğlu
- July 19 – Walter F. George
- July 26 – George S. Patton
- August 2 – Ingrid Bergman
- August 9 – Terry de la Mesa Allen Sr.
- August 16 – Pope Pius XII
- August 23 – Konstantin Rokossovsky
- August 30 – General Ira Eaker
- September 6 – Paul Hoffman
- September 13 – Dwight D. Eisenhower
- September 20 – Bob Hope
- September 27 – Sam Rayburn
- October 4 – Mark W. Clark
- October 11 – Heinrich Himmler
- October 18 – Francisco Franco
- October 25 – Vyacheslav Molotov
- November 1 – Thomas E. Dewey
- November 8 – Mineichi Koga
- November 15 – John J. Pershing
- November 22 – Donald W. Douglas
- November 29 – Franklin D. Roosevelt
- December 6 – Claire L. Chennault
- December 13 – Charles Edward Wilson
- December 20 – Greer Garson
- December 27 – Sergius I

== 1944 ==
- January 3 – George Marshall, Man of the Year
- January 10 – Erich von Manstein
- January 17 – Oveta Culp Hobby
- January 24 – Jimmy Durante
- January 31 – Earl Warren
- February 7 – Richmond K. Turner
- February 14 – Harrison E. Spangler
- February 21 – Holland Smith
- February 28 – Henry Maitland Wilson, 1st Baron Wilson
- March 6 – King George VI
- March 13 – Tom Connally
- March 20 – Nikolai Voronov
- March 27 – Jan Masaryk
- April 3 – Vannevar Bush
- April 10 – Leverett Saltonstall
- April 17 – Cyril Garbett
- April 24 – John Curtin
- May 1 – Omar Bradley
- May 8 – Jonathan Mayhew Wainwright IV
- May 15 – Alexander Fleming
- May 22 – Jan C. Smuts
- May 29 – Charles de Gaulle
- June 5 – Sir Harold Alexander
- June 12 – Carl Andrew Spaatz
- June 19 – Dwight D. Eisenhower
- June 26 – Raymond A. Spruance
- July 3 – Shigetarō Shimada
- July 10 – Bernard Law Montgomery, 1st Viscount Montgomery of Alamein
- July 17 – Ernie Pyle
- July 24 – Sidney Hillman
- July 31 – Alexander Novikov
- August 7 – Heinz Guderian
- August 14 – Arthur Coningham
- August 21 – Gerd von Rundstedt
- August 28 – Alexander Patch
- September 4 – Liberation of Paris
- September 11 – Leroy Randle Grumman
- September 18 – Harry Crerar
- September 25 – John C. H. Lee
- October 2 – Van Wyck Brooks
- October 9 – Josip Broz Tito
- October 16 – Courtney Hodges
- October 23 – Thomas E. Dewey
- October 30 – Douglas MacArthur
- November 6 – Harry S. Truman
- November 13 – Joseph Stilwell
- November 20 – Edgar Bergen
- November 27 – Juan Perón
- December 4 – Omar Bradley
- December 11 – Edward R. Stettinius Jr.
- December 18 – Tse-veng Soong
- December 25 – Eivind Berggrav

== 1945 ==
- January 1 – Dwight D. Eisenhower, Man of the Year
- January 8 – Anita Colby
- January 15 – Hoyt Vandenberg
- January 22 – Harry Hopkins
- January 29 – Walter Krueger
- February 5 – Joseph Stalin
- February 12 – Heinrich Himmler
- February 19 – William Hood Simpson
- February 26 – Chester W. Nimitz
- March 5 – Abdulaziz al-Saud
- March 12 – Mildred H. McAfee
- March 19 – Sir Miles C. Dempsey
- March 26 – Lord Woolton
- April 2 – Matthew Ridgway
- April 9 – George S. Patton
- April 16 – Simon Bolivar Buckner Jr.
- April 23 – Harry S. Truman
- April 30 – Arthur H. Vandenberg
- May 7 – Adolf Hitler
- May 14 – The Big Three (Joseph Stalin, Winston Churchill and Franklin D. Roosevelt)
- May 21 – Emperor Hirohito
- May 28 – William D. Leahy
- June 4 – Albert Coady Wedemeyer
- June 11 – Robert Evans Woods
- June 18 – Bill Maudin's "Willie"
- June 25 – Lucius D. Clay
- July 2 – Mel Ott
- July 9 – Fred M. Vinson
- July 16 – Lord Wavell
- July 23 – William Halsey Jr.
- July 30 – William Martin Jeffers
- August 6 – Clement Attlee
- August 13 – Curtis LeMay
- August 20 – Fall of Japan
- August 27 – Douglas MacArthur
- September 3 – Chiang Kai-shek
- September 10 – Robert L. Eichelberger
- September 17 – James F. Byrnes
- September 24 – Alfred P. Sloan
- October 1 – Archbishop Damaskinos
- October 8 – Sinclair Lewis
- October 15 – Lewis Schwellenbach
- October 22 – Edvard Beneš
- October 29 – James V. Forrestal
- November 5 – Spruille Braden
- November 12 – Glenn Davis and Doc Blanchard
- November 19 – Sergei Prokofiev
- November 26 – H. T. Webster
- December 3 – Walter Reuther
- December 10 – Nuremberg Defendants (Hermann Goering, Joachim von Ribbentrop, Rudolf Hess, Alfred Rosenberg and Wilhelm Keitel)
- December 17 – Mohammed Reza Pahlavi
- December 24 – The Nativity
- December 31 – Harry S. Truman, Man of the Year

== 1946 ==
- January 7 – William Lyon Mackenzie King
- January 14 – Robert E. Gross
- January 21 – Philip Murray
- January 28 – Craig Rice
- February 4 – Henry Ford II
- February 11 – Stanislaw Mikolajczyk
- February 18 – Ernest Bevin
- February 25 – Cardinal Spellman
- March 4 – Chester Bliss Bowles
- March 11 – Danny Kaye and Sylvia Fine
- March 18 – Francisco Franco
- March 25 – George C. Marshall
- April 1 – Omar Bradley
- April 8 – Laurence Olivier
- April 15 – Amadeo Peter Giannini
- April 22 – Muhammad Ali Jinnah
- April 29 – Gustav T. Kuester
- May 6 – Elizabeth Arden
- May 13 – Queen Wilhelmina
- May 20 – John L. Lewis
- May 27 – Edward H. Crump
- June 3 – Maurice Thorez
- June 10 – Charles Luckman
- June 17 – Joseph Curran
- June 24 – Mark W. Clark
- July 1 – Albert Einstein
- July 8 – Manuel A. Roxas
- July 15 – Roger D. Lapham
- July 22 – Antonio Salazar
- July 29 – Herbert Morrison
- August 5 – Camillien Houde
- August 12 – George E. Allen
- August 19 – Viacheslav Molotov
- August 26 – Jerusalem
- September 2 – Pauline Betz
- September 9 – Jo Davidson
- September 16 – Josip Broz Tito
- September 23 – James Bryant Conant
- September 30 – Henry A. Wallace
- October 7 – Victor Emanuel
- October 14 – Frank Leahy
- October 21 – Eugene O'Neill
- October 28 – Edward Martin
- November 4 – Charles Francis Adams III
- November 11 – Helen Traubel
- November 18 – Joseph William Martin Jr.
- November 25 – Trygve Lie
- December 2 – George Messersmith
- December 9 – Andrei Zhdanov
- December 16 – John L. Lewis
- December 23 – Sukarno
- December 30 – Marian Anderson

== 1947 ==
- January 6 – James F. Byrnes, Man of the Year
- January 13 – Milton Caniff
- January 20 – Robert A. Taft
- January 27 – Vallabhbhai Patel
- February 3 – Robert R. Young
- February 10 – Deborah Kerr
- February 17 – Artur Rodziński
- February 24 – King George II
- March 3 – Joseph H. Ball
- March 10 – George C. Marshall
- March 17 – Arnold J. Toynbee
- March 24 – Eugene Holman
- March 31 – Princess Elizabeth
- April 7 – Fred Allen
- April 14 – Leo Durocher
- April 21 – William A. Patterson
- April 28 – Miguel Alemán
- May 5 – Palmiro Togliatti
- May 12 – Arthur H. Vandenberg
- May 19 – J. Arthur Rank
- May 26 – Chen Li-Fu
- June 2 – Billy Rose
- June 9 – Robert McCormick
- June 16 – Ernest Gruening
- June 23 – Dwight D. Eisenhower
- June 30 – Mahatma Gandhi
- July 7 – Marlin Perkins
- July 14 – Eva Perón
- July 21 – George Albert Smith
- July 28 – Hedda Hopper
- August 4 – David Lilienthal
- August 11 – Captain Illingworth
- August 18 – Andrei Gromyko
- August 25 – Harold Stassen
- September 1 – Jake Kramer
- September 8 – C.S. Lewis
- September 15 – Sophie Gimbel
- September 22 – Jackie Robinson
- September 29 – Andrei Vishinsky
- October 6 – Robert Gordon Sproul
- October 13 – William Green
- October 20 – Oscar Hammerstein II
- October 27 – India
- November 3 – Robert A. Chappuis
- November 10 – Sir Stafford Cripps
- November 17 – Charles de Gaulle
- November 24 – deLesseps S. Morrison
- December 1 – Lewis Douglas
- December 8 – Rebecca West
- December 15 – Robert J. Kleberg Jr.
- December 22 – Joseph Farrington
- December 29 – Madonna and Child by Alesso Baldovinetti

== 1948 ==
- January 5 – George C. Marshall, Man of the Year
- January 12 – Gregory Peck
- January 19 – W. Stuart Symington
- January 26 – James Caesar Petrillo
- February 2 – Barbara Ann Scott
- February 9 – Edwin P. Hubble
- February 16 – Benjamin Britten
- February 23 – Karl Marx
- March 1 – Robert Schuman
- March 8 – Reinhold Niebuhr
- March 15 – Clark Clifford
- March 22 – Lavrenty Beria
- March 29 – Robert A. Lovett
- April 5 – Markos Vafiades
- April 12 – Roy A. Roberts
- April 19 – Alcide de Gasperi
- April 26 – Arturo Toscanini
- May 3 – George Gallup
- May 10 – Paul-Henri Spaak
- May 17 – Eddie Arcaro
- May 24 – Abdullah I
- May 31 – Augustus E. John
- June 7 – William O'Dwyer
- June 14 – Wall Street Bull
- June 21 – James H. Duff
- June 28 – Jean Simmons
- July 5 – Thomas E. Dewey
- July 12 – Lucius D. Clay
- July 19 – Howard Hughes
- July 26 – Igor Stravinsky
- August 2 – Mel Patton
- August 9 – Henry A. Wallace
- August 16 – David Ben-Gurion
- August 23 – Betty Grable
- August 30 – Earl Long
- September 6 – Queen Juliana
- September 13 – Garfield Bromley Oxnam
- September 20 – Ana Pauker
- September 27 – Earl Warren
- October 4 – Joe DiMaggio
- October 11 – Strom Thurmond
- October 18 – Douglas Freeman
- October 25 – William C. Menninger
- November 1 – Election, U.S.A
- November 8 – Robert Oppenheimer
- November 15 – Anastasio Somoza
- November 22 – Tallulah Bankhead
- November 29 – Dave Beck
- December 6 – Chiang Kai-shek
- December 13 – Drew Pearson
- December 20 – Olivia de Havilland
- December 27 – Christmas Eve

== 1949 ==
- January 3 – Harry S. Truman, Man of the Year
- January 10 – Ben Hogan
- January 17 – Hubert Humphrey
- January 24 – Charles E. Wilson
- January 31 – Cole Porter
- February 7 – Mao Zedong
- February 14 – József Mindszenty
- February 21 – Louis Armstrong
- February 28 – Dean Acheson
- March 7 – John P. Marquand
- March 14 – Perle Mesta
- March 21 – Aneurin Bevan
- March 28 – Juan Trippe
- April 4 – Diego Rivera
- April 11 – Paul G. Hoffman
- April 18 – Chuck Yeager
- April 25 – Eugene Dennis
- May 2 – Luis Muñoz Marín
- May 9 – Douglas MacArthur
- May 16 – Milton Berle
- May 23 – James Van Fleet
- May 30 – Ben A. Jones
- June 6 – Louis A. Johnson
- June 13 – Princess Margaret
- June 20 – John Jay McCloy
- June 27 – Cornelius P. Rhoads
- July 4 – Fletcher Bowron
- July 11 – Albert Schweitzer
- July 18 – King Leopold III and Princess de Rethy
- July 25 – Harold Lloyd
- August 1 – General de Tassigny
- August 8 – J. Edgar Hoover
- August 15 – Richard Neutra
- August 22 – Elizabeth Taylor
- August 29 – David Dubinsky
- September 5 – Stan Musial
- September 12 – Louis St. Laurent
- September 19 – Lisa Fonssagrives
- September 26 – Sir Oliver Franks
- October 3 – Richard K. Mellon
- October 10 – Margaret Clapp
- October 17 – Jawaharlal Nehru
- October 24 – Harold Medina
- October 31 – Raymond Loewy
- November 7 – Selman Waksman
- November 14 – Margot Fonteyn
- November 21 – Robert M. Hutchins
- November 28 – Frank Costello
- December 5 – Konrad Adenauer
- December 12 – Conrad N. Hilton
- December 19 – Charles Munch
- December 26 – Ernest I. Pugmire

Previous	Lists of covers of Time magazine	Next
1930s	1940s	1950s
