= Jordana Cutler =

American-Israeli public policy professional

- Born: Washington, D.C.
- Education: Brandeis University, Hebrew University
- Employer: Meta Platforms
- Political party: Likud

Jordana Cutler (Hebrew: ג'ורדנה קטלר) is an American-Israeli public policy professional. Since 2016, she has been the Director of Public Policy for Israel at Meta Platforms, with her role expanding to additionally cover the Jewish diaspora in 2020. She was formerly a senior adviser to Israeli Prime Minister Benjamin Netanyahu.

== Early life and education ==
Cutler was born in Washington, D.C., and grew up in a Zionist home. She studied political science and communications at Brandeis University. After her undergraduate studies, Cutler worked for three years at the Israeli embassy in Washington, DC in public affairs and as its chief of staff.

== Career in Israel ==
In 2007, she immigrated to Israel and began masters studies at Hebrew University in Jerusalem.

=== Adviser ===
In 2008, in the second year of her masters, Cutler briefly worked for the Likud Party as a campaign adviser. She then worked as an adviser in the office of Prime Minister Benjamin Netanyahu for almost five years, joining his office as Deputy to Senior Advisor Ron Dermer. She was later appointed Advisor on Diaspora Affairs.

=== Meta ===
In 2016, Cutler became Director of Public Policy for Israel at Meta Platforms, which owns Facebook and Instagram. In 2020, she became Director of Public Policy for Israel and the Jewish Diaspora, a role she created at the company and that has no parallel in any other high-tech company. In an interview with The Jerusalem Post, which described her as "our woman at Facebook," Cutler said, "My job is to represent Facebook to Israel, and represent Israel to Facebook." As part of this role, Cutler leads the company's activities in various policy areas in cooperation with Jewish organizations and international bodies. According to Makor Rishon, Cutler is subjected to antisemitism and threats from the Arab world and global media. Meta has no equivalent counterpart representing Palestinian users, which critics say demonstrates a substantial disparity in representation.

In 2021, The Intercept reported that Cutler supported the removal of a Students for Justice in Palestine post containing a reading list that included books by authors affiliated with Palestinian organizations Meta considers terrorist groups: the Democratic Front for the Liberation of Palestine (DFLP) and the Popular Front for the Liberation of Palestine (PFLP). According to +972 Magazine, Cutler was a key figure in Facebook's 2021 content moderation policy discussions regarding use of the term 'Zionist,' which came amid pressure from various groups for the company to adopt IHRA definition of antisemitism.

==== During the Gaza war ====
According to The Intercept, Cutler has in this position sought to suppress content perceived to be in support of Palestine or contrary to Israeli interests, invoking Meta's 'Dangerous Organizations and Individuals' policy—which prevents Facebook and Instagram users from discussing any of thousands of undisclosed blacklisted entities—to flag posts for removal. Among these were posts by Students for Justice in Palestine, a group involved with the Gaza war protests on college campuses. Drop Site News reports that, as late as March 2025, Cutler "actively instructed employees of the company to search for and review content mentioning Ghassan Kanafani" under Meta's "Glorification, Support or Representation" policy of individuals or organizations "that proclaim a violent mission or are engaged in violence to have a presence on our platforms."

=== Ministry of Strategic Affairs ===
In January 2023, Ron Dermer, Israeli Minister of Strategic Affairs, reportedly expressed intent to appoint Cutler for Director General of the Ministry of Strategic Affairs.
