= David Dermer =

American politician (born 1963)

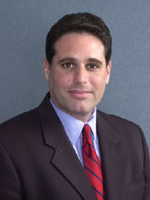

35th Mayor of Miami Beach
- In office November 13, 2001 – November 21, 2007
- Preceded by: Neisen Kasdin
- Succeeded by: Matti Herrera Bower

Personal details
- Education: American University; Samford University

David Dermer (born 1963) was a Miami Beach City Commissioner before being elected as their Mayor. He is a lifelong Democrat, but supported George W. Bush for United States president in 2004. His brother is Ron Dermer, the former Israeli ambassador to the US and the Israeli Minister of Strategic Affairs since 2022 to Prime Minister Benjamin Netanyahu. His father Jay Dermer also served as mayor of Miami Beach.

== Career ==
Dermer served as Mayor for three terms from 2002 until 2008. He also serves on the advisory board of the Sacred Grounds Foundation.

In 2005, Dermer passed a law that banned sex offenders from living within 2,500 feet of schools, parks and other places frequented by minors. Fearing an influx of sex offenders from Miami Beach, other Miami Dade County cities soon passed similar ordinances, eventually causing the Julia Tuttle Causeway sex offender colony to be created underneath the bridge linking Miami to Miami Beach. Ironically, Dermer's ordinance, which had been intended to exclude sex offenders from Miami Beach, instead resulted in sex offenders from all across the county being dumped on the entrance to Miami Beach.
