= Gaston Henry-Haye =

French merchant, politician and diplomat

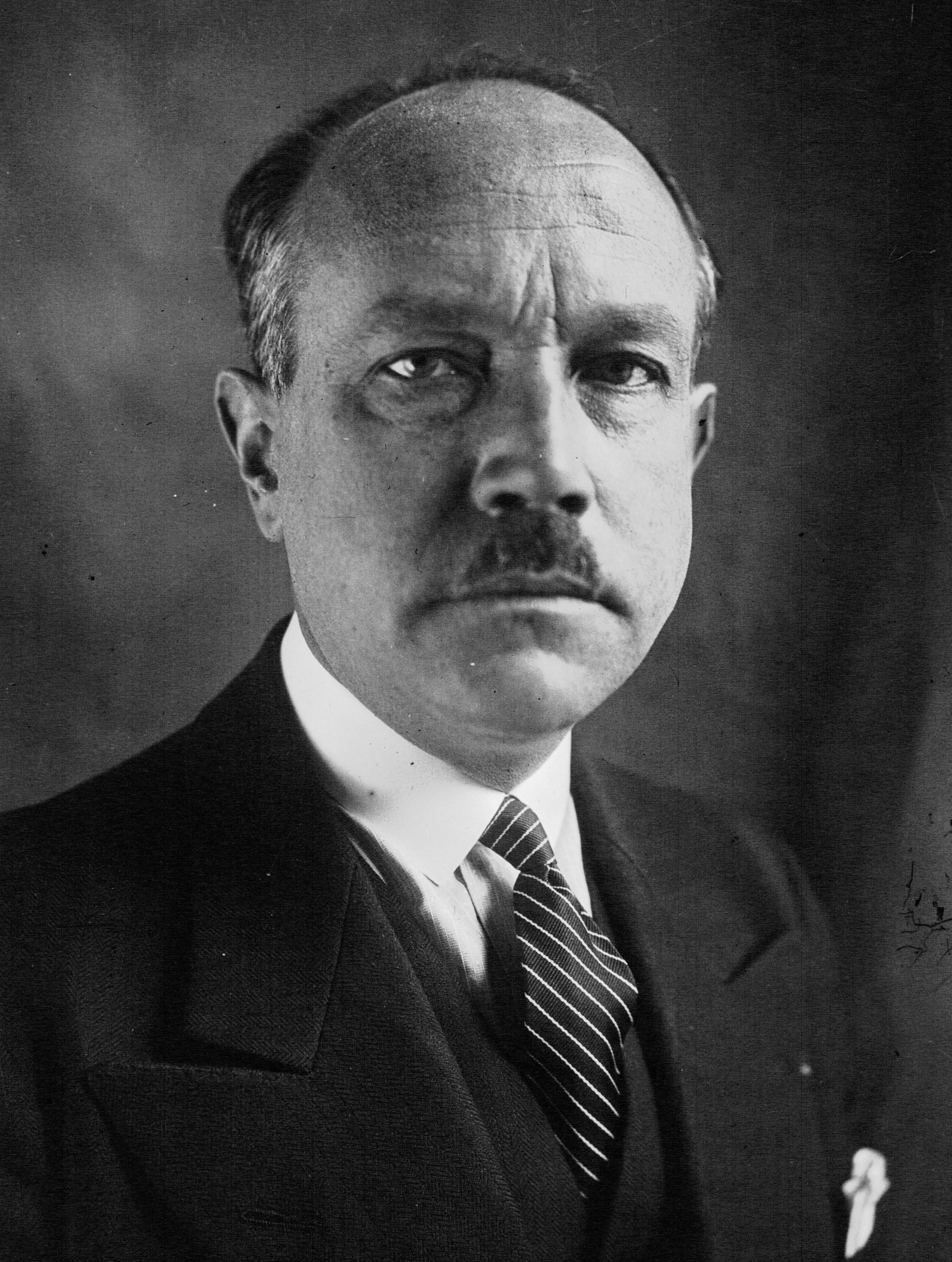
- Gaston Henry-Haye in 1932
- Born: 6 February 1890; Wissous, France
- Died: 16 October 1983 (aged 93); Paris, France
- Occupation: Politician

Gaston Henry-Haye (born 6 February 1890 in Wissous, France, died 16 October 1983 in Paris, France) was a French merchant, politician and diplomat.

He served in the French French Chamber of Deputies from 1928 to 1935 and in the French Senate from 1935 to 1944. He was also Mayor of Versailles from 1935 to 1944. He voted for full powers to Marshal Philippe Pétain on 10 July 1940 and was appointed by Pétain as ambassador of Vichy France to the United States in 1940 after the armistice between Vichy France and Nazi Germany. His photograph was featured on the cover of Time magazine on 10 March 1941.

Henry-Haye was interned by the United States in 1942, following the occupation of Vichy France by Germany. His internment as a diplomat was unusual, as no state of war existed between Vichy France and the United States. He was allowed to return to Vichy France in 1944, but he escaped to South Africa after death threats by the French Resistance.

He returned to France in 1950 and returned to public notice in 1966, when he successfully sued author H. Montgomery Hyde for libel.
