= Ministry of Strategic Affairs =

Government ministry of Israel

- המשרד לנושאים אסטרטגיים
- Emblem of Israel

Agency overview
- Formed: 2006
- Jurisdiction: Government of Israel
- Minister responsible: Ron Dermer

The Ministry of Strategic Affairs and Public Diplomacy (Hebrew: המשרד לנושאים אסטרטגיים, HaMisrad LeNos'im Estrategi'im — MLS) is an Israeli government ministry responsible for leading the campaign of expanding the Abraham Accords and the handling of ties on White House matters.

The ministry’s former responsibility was leading a campaign against the BDS movement.

== History ==
The Ministry was created in 2006 for Avigdor Lieberman, whose Yisrael Beiteinu party had just joined the governing coalition. Lieberman had demanded the Internal Security Minister post, but as he was under police investigation, and the post was already held by Avi Dichter, a new ministry was created for him, with the role of coordinating security, intelligence and diplomatic initiatives regarding Iran and other strategic threats. Lieberman left the government on 18 January 2008, and the ministry was closed down in April. In 2009, it was resurrected and repurposed under Prime Minister Benjamin Netanyahu. The ministry was closed in August 2021 by the 36th government of Israel, but was brought back again by the 37th government with the appointment of Ron Dermer as minister. Alongside Dermer's appointment, it was published that Jordana Cutler, formerly an advisor to Prime Minister Netanyahu and currently holding a senior position at the social network Facebook, was expected to assume the role of director of the ministry. However, a few months later, it was revealed that Dermer had not yet endorsed her appointment or that of any other candidate for the position. In effect, as of May 2023, the ministry was still operating without a director.

| # | Minister | Party | Government | Term start | Term end | Notes |
|---|---|---|---|---|---|---|
| 1 | Avigdor Lieberman | Yisrael Beiteinu | 31 | 30 October 2006 | 18 January 2008 | |
| 2 | Ehud Olmert | Kadima | 31 | 18 January 2008 | 13 April 2008 | Serving Prime Minister |
| 3 | Moshe Ya'alon | Likud | 32 | 31 March 2009 | 18 March 2013 | |
| 4 | Yuval Steinitz | Likud | 33 | 18 March 2013 | 14 May 2015 | |
| 5 | Ze'ev Elkin | Likud | 34 | 14 May 2015 | 25 May 2015 | |
| 6 | Gilad Erdan | Likud | 34 | 25 May 2015 | 17 May 2020 | |
| 7 | Orit Farkash-Hacohen | Blue and White | 35 | 17 May 2020 | 30 November 2020 | |
| 8 | Michael Biton | Blue and White | 35 | 30 November 2020 | 13 June 2021 | |
| 9 | Yair Lapid | Yesh Atid | 36 | 13 June 2021 | 3 August 2021 | |
| 10 | Ron Dermer | Likud | 37 | 29 December 2022 | 13 November 2025 | Not an MK |

== Budget ==
The Ministry's director general, Sima Vaknin-Gil stated in 2016 that the budget for the Ministry's anti-BDS efforts for that year was NIS 44 million ($11 million).

== Activities ==
Under Gildad Erdan's leadership, the Ministry attempted to keep its activities secret. Erdan and Vaknin-Gil even tried, unsuccessfully, to exempt the Ministry from the Israeli Freedom of Information Law. In 2016, Vaknin-Gil refused to divulge details of the Ministry's activities to a committee of Israeli parliamentarians. "A lot of what we do is under the radar," she told them. However, the Ministry came under a new leadership in 2018; Orit Farkash-Hacohen became the new Strategic Affairs Minister and Ronen Manelis his director general. They announced that they intended to increase the Ministry's transparency which allowed previously secret documents to be published.

The Ministry believes that state propaganda is less effective in persuading the public than institutions and individuals perceived as acting independently. The Ministry has therefore created a "network" of domestic and international organizations to advance the state's "message."

=== Purchasing favorable news coverage ===
In January 2020, the Israeli investigative magazine The Seventh Eye reported that the Ministry was buying space in mainstream Israeli newspapers to promote its campaign against the BDS movement.

The campaign began in summer 2017 with a budget of ILS 7 million campaign to influence media outlets such as Yedioth Ahronoth, The Jerusalem Post, and the Keshet Media Group. The Ministry paid NIS 120,000 to place articles in The Jerusalem Post and NIS 70,000 to "sponsor" a conference hosted by the newspaper. In exchange for the sponsorship, the Ministry received a 30-minute-panel at the conference which included a screening of a film produced by the Ministry about BDS and anti-Semitism. Prior to the conference, The Jerusalem Post published several articles and op-eds about supposed "links between BDS and anti-Semitism."

Karin Peretz of the Ministry's "public arena" arm told the Seventh Eye that the payment included "sponsored content" but a spokesperson for the Ministry later stated that Peretz was mistaken and that the payment did not include a series of articles. The Jerusalem Post denied that the articles had been paid for.

In October 2020, The Seventh Eye reported that the Ministry in 2019 had paid The Jerusalem Post NIS 120,000 to publish a special supplement titled Unmasking BDS. The Ministry's own officials were interviewed in the supplement as well as Republican Senator Ted Cruz.

=== Act.IL ===
The Ministry supports and funds Act.IL, a grassroots mobilization app that directs its users to serve Israel online. For example, by commenting on and sharing pro-Israel material on social media and to flag, report, and respond to criticism of Israel.

=== Closure of bank accounts ===
In 2019, the Ministry announced that a financial campaign had resulted in the shutdown of 30 financial accounts belonging to BDS-promoting non-governmental organizations (NGOs); 20 in Europe and 10 in the U.S. Among them, accounts belonging to the Samidoun Palestinian Prisoner Solidarity Network, the Palestinian BDS National Committee, and Al-Haq. The accounts were shut down through a combination of efforts by the Ministry, Shurat HaDin, and the International Legal Forum.

== Coordination with NGOs ==
The Ministry cooperates and coordinates with several Israeli and international pro-Israel non-governmental organizations. Among them, Shurat HaDin, the International Legal Forum, the Foundation for Defense of Democracies, and the Israel on Campus Coalition. The Ministry has given $445,000 to the American think tank Institute for the Study of Global Antisemitism and Policy, and $40,000 to the American anti-Muslim hate group Proclaiming Justice to the Nations.

In 2017, the Ministry announced the formation of an anti-BDS legal network. As part of this network, the Ministry-funded NGO the International Legal Forum, would distribute grants of NIS 600,000 to professionals and organizations engaged in the legal fight against BDS.

In 2020, the Ministry announced a "financial aid program" to the "pro-Israel network" to counteract the funding crisis triggered by the COVID-19 pandemic.

A diplomatic cable first reported about in the Israeli newspaper Haaretz in 2017 caused controversy as it indicated that the Ministry had attempted to "operate" British Jewish organizations. The Israeli Foreign Ministry which, had sent the cable to the Strategic Affairs Ministry, cautioned it not to do so. "The strategic affairs ministry must understand that ‘operating’ organisations directly from Jerusalem by email and telephone isn't good for their health," it warned.

== Criticism ==
In 2019, critics alleged that the Ministry leads an intimidation campaign against BDS activists worldwide.

The Ministry has also been criticized for its cooperation with, and sometimes funding of, American NGOs, which critics believe could violate the U.S. Foreign Agents Registration Act.

== See also ==
- Boycott, Divestment and Sanctions
- Minister in the Prime Minister's Office
- Hasbara (Public diplomacy of Israel)
