= Harold Rosen (mayor) =

American politician and lawyer (1925–2018)

27th Mayor of Miami Beach, Florida
- In office August 10, 1974 – November 1, 1977
- Preceded by: Chuck Hall
- Succeeded by: Leonard Haber

Personal details
- Born: December 30, 1925 Watertown, New York, U.S.
- Died: January 16, 2018 (aged 92)
- Spouse: Judie Rosen (m. 1976–2018)
- Children: 3

Harold Rosen (December 30, 1925 – January 16, 2018) was an American lawyer and politician. Rosen first became acting Mayor of Miami Beach, Florida, in 1974 following the death of his predecessor, Mayor Chuck Hall, who died in office.

Rosen ultimately served as Mayor from 1974–1977, and is credited with beginning the revitalization of Miami Beach, notably by abolishing rent control in 1976, a move that was highly controversial at the time.

== Biography ==
=== Early life ===
Rosen was born to Joseph and Roslyn Rosen on December 30, 1925, in Watertown, New York. He was raised in Watertown and nearby Carthage, New York. Rosen received his bachelor's degree from St. Lawrence University in New York. He enlisted in the United States Navy and served in both World War II and the Korean War.

=== Career ===
Rosen moved to Miami Beach in 1948 and enrolled at University of Miami School of Law in nearby Coral Gables, where obtained his law degree in 1952. He became licensed to practice law in Florida on April 14, 1952. His specialties included governmental and administrative law, as well as commercial and construction litigation.

By the early 1970s, Harold Rosen had become an influential figure in Miami Beach due to his roles as a lawyer and city commissioner. Rosen had risen to the office of vice-mayor of Miami Beach by 1974, when incumbent Mayor Chuck Hall died in office, leaving an unexpected vacancy for the city's chief executive. In response to Hall's death, city commissioners had to choose a successor and became deadlocked. Rosen, the vice-mayor who was not believed to have aspirations to become mayor prior in 1974, volunteered for the position. In 2011 interview with Florida International University, Rosen recalled the moment saying, "So I said to these guys, I'm gonna be the mayor, I’ll take the job...who's gonna vote against me? And I became the mayor." He went on to serve as Mayor from 1974 until 1977 (including a full two-year term from 1975 to 1977).

Rosen inherited a city facing a number of pressing issues during the 1970s, including urban decay, poverty, a large elderly population, and rent control. During his mayoral tenure, Rosen is credited with beginning the transformation from a declining city into the world-known destination that Miami Beach is known for today. According to Seth Bramson, a history professor at Barry University, "Harold Rosen started the renaissance...He brought a great sense of optimism to Miami Beach."

One of Rosen's most controversial - and applauded - proposals was to eliminate rent control, a policy meant to protect Miami Beach's elderly residents, but also imposed price ceilings on landlords and property owners. Rosen originally proposed the abolition of rent control in 1970 while he was still a city commissioner. The response was swift and negative from residents. Rosen recalled that "all the old people" were angry at the idea and worried about potential rent increases. Rosen did not care at the time, later saying, "The commissioners at that time... they didn't want to go against the vote [for future elections]. I couldn’t care less because I didn’t wanna go any higher beyond the city commission. So it never bothered me."

Rosen once again proposed the idea to eliminate rent control once he became mayor. This time, Rosen managed to find the commissioner votes needed to abolish the rent regulation. Miami Beach city commissioners narrowly voted to eliminate rent control in a 4-3 vote in 1976 in a victory for Rosen. However, the move proved highly controversial. Still, in 1977 the Florida Legislature also voted to eliminate rent controls in the state. A number of pro-rent control lawsuits followed, but these ordinances were largely struck down by a series of court rulings during the 1980s.

Rosen presided over an urban renewal project during the 1970s in an area south of Sixth Street which proved less successful. In 1973, the city government had passed a moratorium on so-called "unplanned development" in the neighborhood, which was home to some of Miami Beach's oldest buildings. This led to the property values of apartment buildings and hotels to stagnate or decline, which led to some of the structures falling into disrepair. The city, under Rosen, then sought to demolish more 372 structures in the neighborhood, which required Florida state approval that the neighborhood be declared blighted. The city commission ultimately declared the area blighted and in decay, despite opposition from then-State's Attorney for Dade County Janet Reno and Miami Beach residents. Years later, Rosen regretted the blight designation and demolitions, telling the Miami Herald, "It wasn't that blighted. That was just a word we had to use. Some parts of it were bad, but the majority was good. I think we just wanted to change the image. It was becoming a lot of small co-ops for the elderly and we didn’t want a retirement community for the elderly...Regrettably, there’s been a tremendous price."

In addition to his work as an attorney, Rosen was also a registered lobbyist. He helped a construction firm secure a $200 million in public right-of-way project contract in 2001, which was the largest public contract in Miami Beach's history at the time.

By the mid-2010s, Rosen was serving as an attorney for the City of Miami Beach Visitors and Convention Authority.

Harold Rosen died on January 16, 2018, at the age of 92. He was survived by his wife of forty-two years, Judie Rosen; sister, Fay Friedland; two children; ten grandchildren, and one great-grandchild. His funeral was held at Temple Emanu-El in Miami Beach on January 19, 2018.

== See also ==
- Miami Beach Mayors
