= Ron Dermer =

Former Israeli ambassador to the U.S. (born 1971)

- רון דרמר
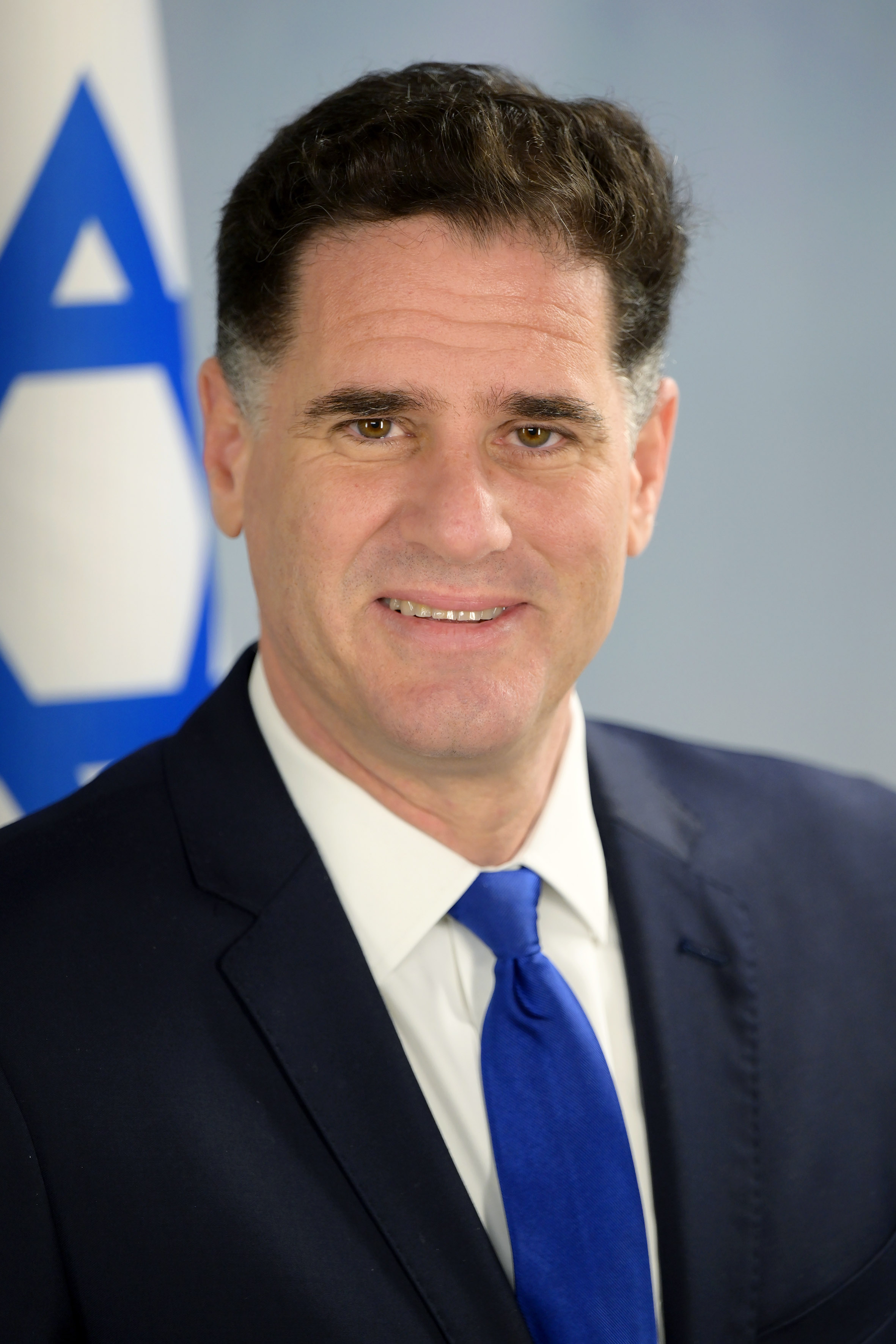
- Official portrait, 2023

Ministerial roles
- 2022–2025: Minister of Strategic Affairs

Diplomatic roles
- 2013–2021: Ambassador to the United States

Personal details
- Born: 16 April 1971 (age 55) Miami Beach, Florida, U.S.
- Citizenship: United States (1971–2005); Israel (1997–present)
- Party: Likud
- Spouses: Adi Blumberg (m. 1998; died 2000) Rhoda Pagano (m. 2002)
- Children: 5
- Education: University of Pennsylvania; University of Oxford
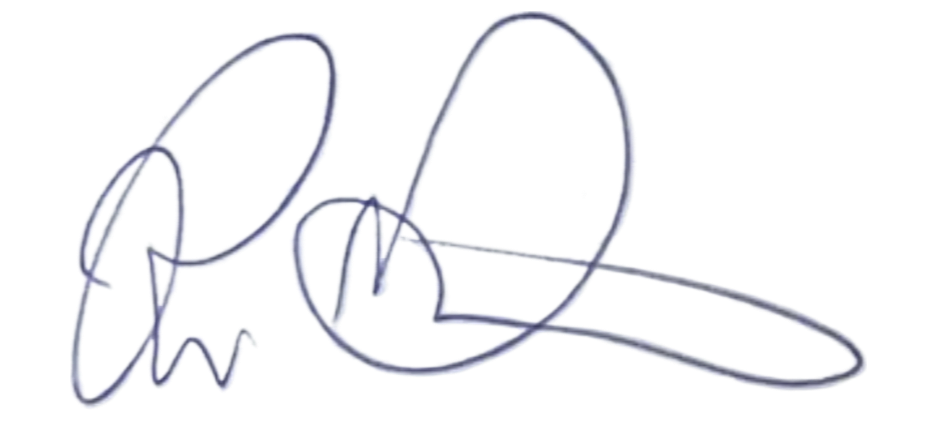
- Signature

Ron Dermer (Hebrew: רון דרמר; born 16 April 1971) is an American-born Israeli politician and diplomat who served as the Minister of Strategic Affairs from 2022 until 2025 and as head of the negotiations for hostages' release in 2025. He served as the Israeli Ambassador to the United States from 2013 to 2021.

== Early life ==
Dermer was born and raised in Miami Beach, Florida, to Jay Dermer, a lawyer from New York who was Mayor of Miami Beach from 1967 to 1971, and Yaffa, née Rosenthal, born in Mandate Palestine. Her parents, Joseph and Rivka, had fled growing antisemitism in Poland and Germany in the 1930s. A few years after the establishment of the State of Israel in 1948, the family emigrated to Florida. Dermer visited Israel during his childhood to see his grandmother Rivka, who returned to live there after Joseph’s death.

His father died of a heart attack in 1984, two weeks before Dermer's Bar Mitzvah. His brother, David Dermer served as Miami Beach mayor from 2001 to 2007.

Growing up, Dermer attended Rabbi Alexander S. Gross Hebrew Academy, a Jewish Day School in Miami Beach, with Shmuley Boteach.

=== Education ===
In 1993, Dermer graduated magna cum laude from the Wharton School of the University of Pennsylvania with concentrations in Finance and Management. While there, he was a member of the Zeta Beta Tau fraternity and a founding member of the Jewish Heritage Program run by Rabbi Menachem Schmidt. At a 2014 Wharton School alumni dinner, Dermer said in a speech that he chose to attend the school after reading Donald J. Trump's book The Art of the Deal.

== Early career ==
Following his time at the University of Pennsylvania, Dermer worked for a year in Washington, D.C., with University of Pennsylvania adjunct professor Dr. Frank Luntz, where he learned about polling and political strategy. Luntz later described Dermer as "the most talented student I've ever had."

In 1993, Dermer left Washington to earn an additional degree in Philosophy, Politics and Economics (PPE) from Oxford University. While there, he served as President of the Oxford University L'Chaim Society.

In 1995, while still at Oxford, Dermer conducted the polling and formulated the strategy for Natan Sharansky's Yisrael BaAliyah party in its successful 1996 Knesset election campaign. Dermer worked for Sharansky again in the Knesset elections of 1999, and in 2000 Sharansky recommended that former Prime Minister Benjamin Netanyahu, then planning a political comeback, meet with Dermer. Dermer has been advising Netanyahu ever since and is one of his closest confidantes.

From 2001 to 2004, Dermer wrote a column called The Numbers Game for The Jerusalem Post. In 2004, he co-wrote with Sharansky the book The Case For Democracy: The Power of Freedom to Overcome Tyranny and Terror.

From 2005 to 2008, Dermer served as the economic attaché at the Israeli Embassy in Washington. This position required that Dermer give up his American citizenship. Dermer explained his decision to do so in an article entitled "Proud to Have Been an American," initially published in the New York Sun and republished in The Jerusalem Post under the title "Why I Left the America I Love". Dermer's appointment as Israel's Minister of Economic Affairs in the United States was made while Netanyahu was serving as Finance Minister under Ariel Sharon. During his tenure as economic envoy, Dermer helped secure the 2007, 10-year memorandum of understanding on military assistance to Israel. He also worked to convince individual states to divest state pension funds from Iran. In 2007, his native state of Florida became the first state to pass divestment legislation.

In 2008, after his return to Israel, Dermer worked on Netanyahu's successful election campaign for Prime Minister, and in 2009 Dermer was named Senior Advisor to the Prime Minister. While in the Prime Minister's Office, Dermer was considered Netanyahu's closest adviser and strategic consultant. The Jerusalem Post said he "runs much of the interference with the White House, and is intimately involved in the diplomatic process with the Palestinians … [and] writes many of Netanyahu's speeches". In 2011, Allison Hoffman of Tablet magazine called him "Bibi's Brain", quoting a long-time observer of Israeli politics as saying, "if you look at Ron, you see Bibi."

On 28 December 2012, Israeli newspaper Makor Rishon reported that Dermer's name was being floated as a potential replacement for Michael Oren, Israel's Ambassador to the United States. The Prime Minister's Office declined to comment on the report and the Embassy of Israel in Washington spokesman called the report "baseless". In March 2013, Dermer left the Prime Minister's Office, and on 9 July 2013, the Prime Minister's office announced that Dermer would replace Oren as Israel's Ambassador to the United States.

== Diplomatic career (2013–2021) ==
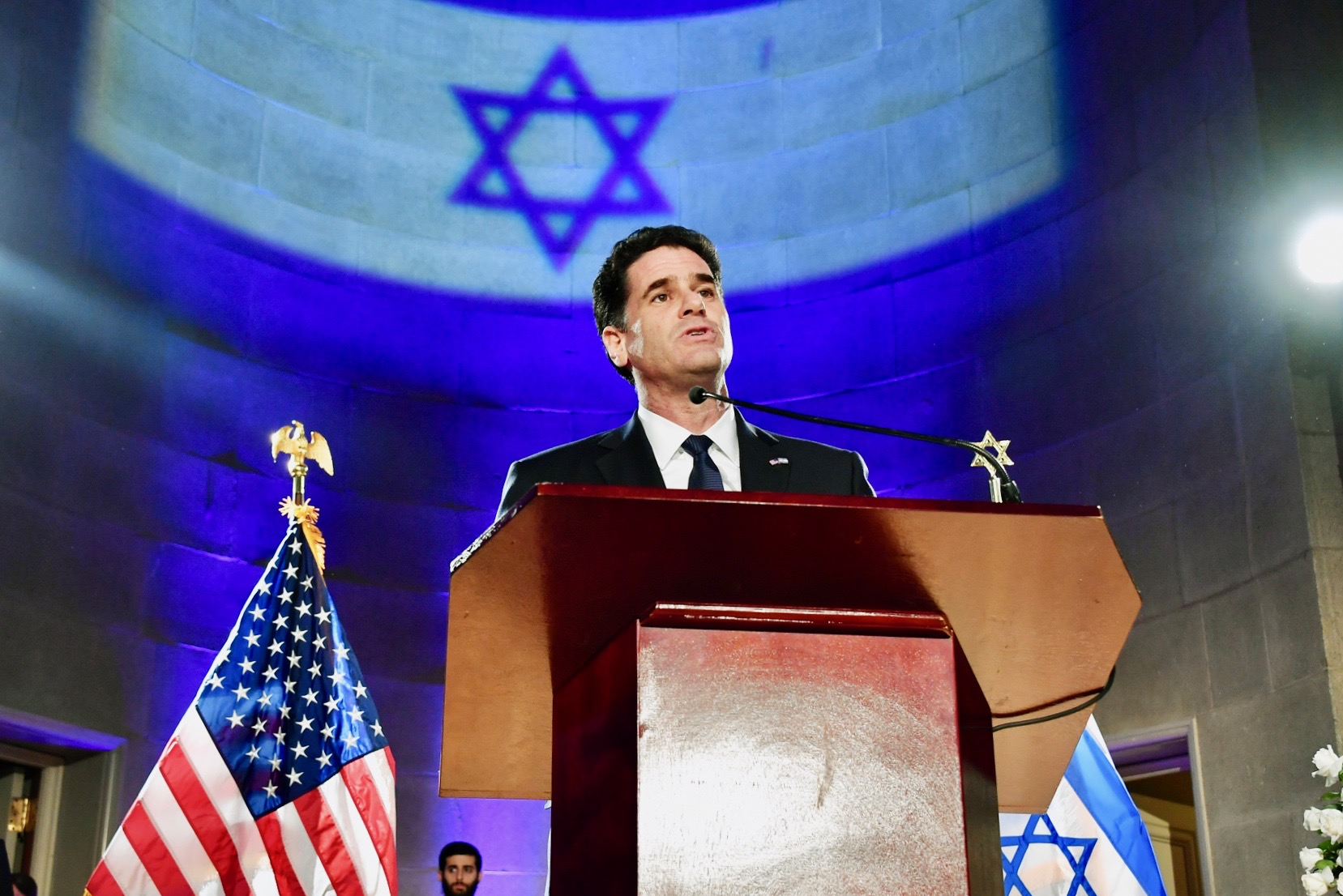
Ambassador Dermer delivers remarks at the Israeli Embassy’s Independence Day Celebration at the Andrew W. Mellon Auditorium in Washington, D.C., on 22 May 2019. [State Department photo by Michael Gross/ Public Domain]

In September 2016, towards the end of the Obama administration, Israel secured from the United States a 10-year, 38 billion dollar military aid package, the largest deal of its kind at the time. In December 2017, during the first Trump presidency, the US recognized Jerusalem as the capital of Israel, and in May 2018 moved the American Embassy to Jerusalem from Tel Aviv. That same month, Israel achieved its top diplomatic priority when the Trump administration withdrew from the Joint Comprehensive Plan of Action with Iran. In March 2019, the US also recognized Israeli sovereignty over the Golan Heights. In 2020, Dermer played a key role in bringing about the Abraham Accords which normalized Israel's relations with the United Arab Emirates and Bahrain. In the wake of the Accords, two more normalization agreements with Morocco and Sudan were signed in late 2020. In light of his contribution to the Abraham Accords and the subsequent normalization agreements, Dermer was nominated by Alan Dershowitz, a loyal backer of US president Donald Trump, along with Jared Kushner (Trump's son-in-law), his deputy Avi Berkowitz and US ambassador to Israel David Friedman, for the Nobel Peace Prize.

Dermer was also credited by Albert Bourla, CEO of Pfizer, for his work in helping Israel obtain millions of Pfizer–BioNTech COVID-19 vaccines and by the convicted American spy Jonathan Pollard for his work in securing his release and arrival in Israel.

Despite tensions over the Iran Deal and Netanyahu's speech to Congress, Dermer helped negotiate a 38 billion dollar military aid package with the US, the largest military aid deal of its kind ever.

In 2019, then Israel's Prime Minister Netanyahu named Dermer, along with former Mossad chief Yossi Cohen, as potential successors.

In July 2019, the Israeli Civil Service Commission rejected a request by Netanyahu and then Foreign Minister, Israel Katz, to extend Dermer's term as Israel's Ambassador to the United States because Israel was in the middle of an election campaign and because Dermer's tenure had already been unusually long. Dermer's term was ultimately extended through 20 January 2021, after serving more than seven years in the post. He was succeeded by Gilad Erdan.

=== Iran nuclear deal ===
In 2015, Prime Minister Benjamin Netanyahu addressed a joint session of Congress over the Iran Deal. Dermer is widely believed to have engineered that speech in which Netanyahu, against the wishes of then-President Barack Obama, urged the US not to become a party to the Nuclear Deal with Iran – the so-called JCPOA—a move members of the Obama administration saw as a politically motivated breach of diplomatic protocol.

Despite the allegation, however, both Dermer and Netanyahu were adamant that their opposition to the JCPOA was rooted in profound concerns about the security of the State of Israel and that they had a moral responsibility to speak out on the issue. As Netanyahu stated, the deal “could well threaten the survival of my country and the future of my people” because it would put Iran, “the foremost sponsor of global terrorism…weeks away from having enough enriched uranium for an entire arsenal of nuclear weapons, and this with full international legitimacy.”

A core problem with the Iran Nuclear Deal for both Netanyahu and Dermer were its so-called sunset clauses, in which all restrictions placed on Iran's nuclear program would be “automatically removed” in several years, regardless of Iran's behavior in the region or its continued efforts to destroy the State of Israel. As Dermer stated in 2015, “[Under the JCPOA,] there is no linkage whatsoever between the removal of these restrictions and Iran’s behavior. In 10 years, Iran could be even more aggressive toward its neighbors, sponsor even more terrorism around the globe and work even harder to destroy Israel, and the restrictions on Iran’s nuclear program would still be automatically removed.” Dermer went on to stress that the sunset clauses meant that in just a few years, “Iran won’t have to sneak into or break into the nuclear club. Under this deal, it could simply decide to walk in.” President Obama himself admitted this weakness of the deal in an interview on NPR in which he stated that in year 13 of the deal (2028), the breakout time for Iran “would have shrunk almost down to zero.”

In July 2015, the Obama administration made the US a party to the JCPOA. In January 2016, the US lifted nuclear-related sanctions against Iran, even as the State Department continued to list Iran as “the foremost state sponsor of terrorism” and even though a majority of the US House of Representatives voted against the deal and a majority of the Senate (58 senators) opposed the deal, with only a filibuster preventing a formal vote against the deal in the Senate.

Netanyahu's and Dermer's fight to defeat the nuclear deal with Iran would bear fruit with a change of administration in Washington. In May 2015, two months after Netanyahu's dramatic speech to Congress mobilized opposition to the deal, Donald Trump announced his candidacy for president. With the Republican Party firmly opposed to the deal, then-candidate Trump pledged to withdraw from it, calling it “a disaster” and “the worst deal ever negotiated.” In September 2017 at the United Nations, President Donald Trump called the Iran Deal an “embarrassment” because it gave Iran “cover” to produce nuclear weapons, and in May 2018, Trump withdrew the US from the Iran Deal and reinstated sanctions against Iran.

Upon leaving his post as ambassador, Dermer stated Netanyahu's speech to Congress was the “proudest moment” of his tenure in Washington. In an interview, Dermer explained: “That speech was the proudest moment I had as ambassador because the job of an Israeli prime minister is to speak out on matters that affect the security and national survival of his country. A prime minister who wouldn’t answer an invitation to speak before the American Congress and public on such an issue would not be worthy of sitting five minutes in his chair.” He also went on to discuss how Netanyahu's speech to Congress paved the way for the historic Abraham Accords.

== Professional career (2021–2022) ==
In April 2022, Dermer went to work for Exigent Capital, an investment management firm based in Jerusalem. Dermer led the firm's strategic investments in the Persian Gulf states.

== Political career (2022–2026) ==
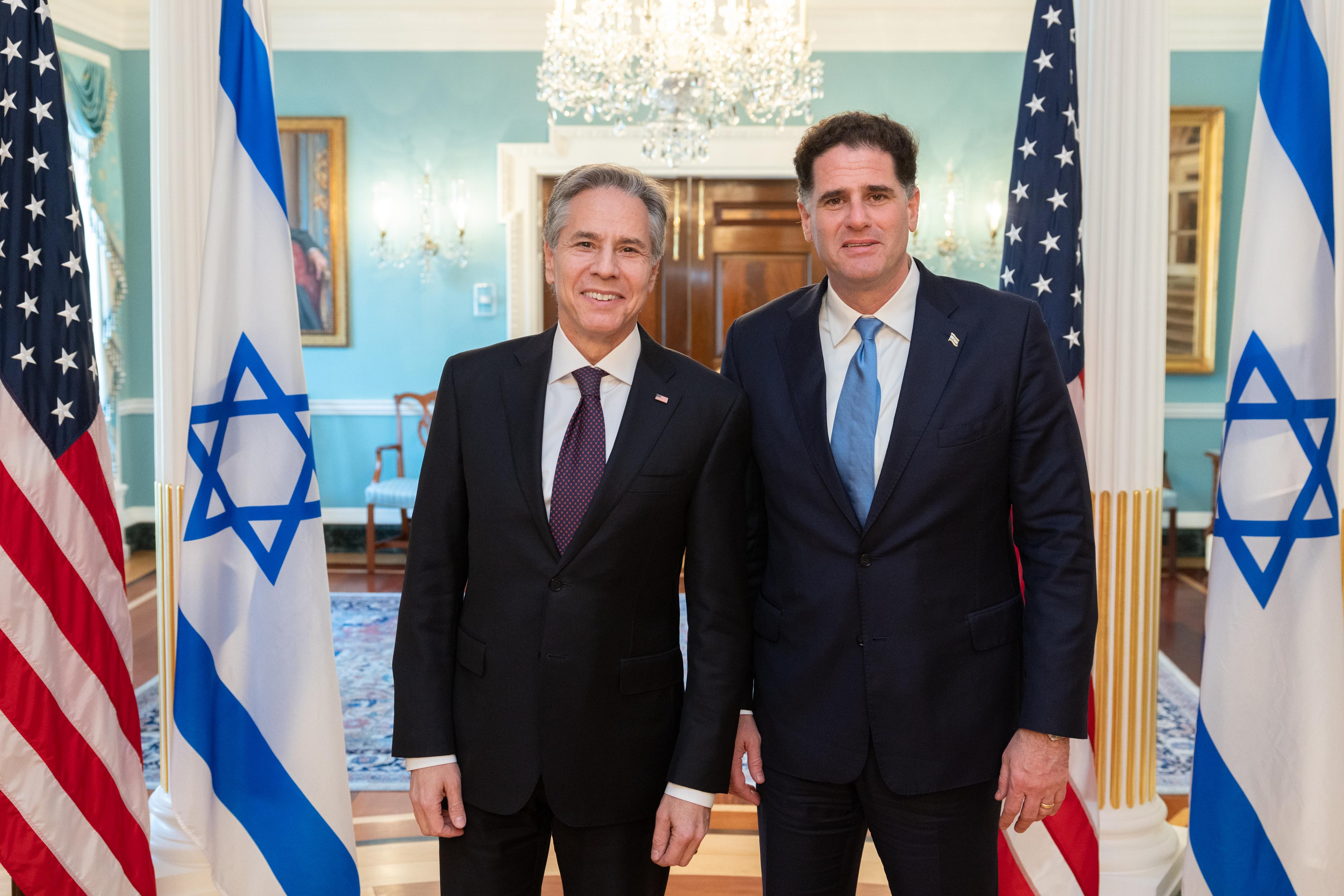
Secretary of State Antony Blinken with Ron Dermer at the State Department in Washington, D.C. on 6 March 2023

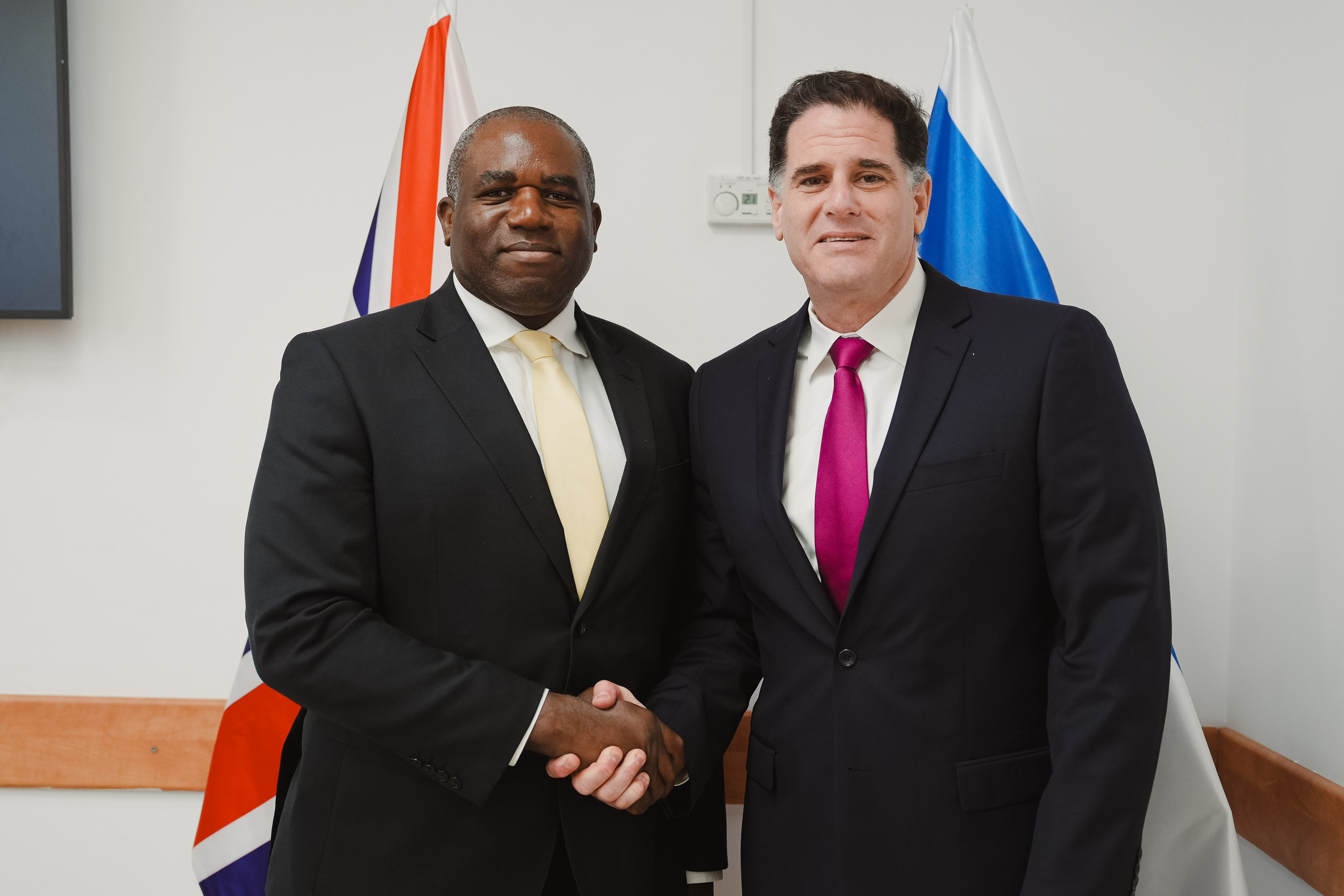
Dermer with British Foreign Secretary David Lammy in Israel, 13 January 2025

In December 2022, following the 2022 Israeli legislative election, Dermer was chosen to head the Ministry of Strategic Affairs in the Thirty-seventh government of Israel. Following the outbreak of the Gaza war, he was appointed as an observer-member of the Israeli war cabinet.

In May 2024, he was critical of the International Criminal Court for “creating a false symmetry between Israel and Hamas."

In February 2025, he was appointed by prime minister Benjamin Netanyahu to head the negotiations for the release of the Israeli hostages held by Hamas in Gaza.

Dermer announced his resignation as Minister of Strategic Affairs on 11 November 2025. His resignation went into effect on 13 November.

In March 2026, Dermer was tasked by Prime Minister Netanyahu to represent Israel in dealing with Lebanon during the 2026 Iran War. Dermer's American counterpart is Massad Boulos.

== Reactions ==
From the beginning tenure as ambassador in Washington, observers and Washington political analysts saw Dermer's appointment as a "mixed bag" for US–Israel relations. According to Israeli journalist Ari Shavit, Dermer was one of the few people Prime Minister Netanyahu trusted enough for the job, and Dermer's understanding of the American political system gave Netanyahu a way to navigate through Washington tactfully. On the other hand, Israeli journalist Barak Ravid said, that “among the White House’s inner circle – Denis McDonough, Ben Rhodes – Dermer [was] a red flag” because he was believed to have “incited Congress and Jewish organizations against Obama” on issues related to the Palestinians and Iran.

In January 2015, the Israeli Civil Service Commission censured Dermer for allegedly taking part in political campaigning for Prime Minister Netanyahu in violation of Civil Service rules when he said in an interview on a non-Israeli television station that did not target Israeli voters that he trusted that the Israeli public would continue to have confidence in Prime Minister Netanyahu. Also in 2015, Dermer received negative press coverage for his “politically charged” choice of holiday gifts which featured products from the West Bank and the Golan Heights. In a letter that accompanied the gifts, Dermer explained that his holiday gift was a direct response to a recent European Union decision to label goods originating in the West Bank and the Golan Heights as goods originating in “occupied Palestinian territories”. In the letter, Dermer also called the EU decision “the latest effort by Israel’s enemies to destroy the one and only Jewish state.”

In December 2016 Dermer accepted an award from the Center for Security Policy, a conservative think tank led by Frank Gaffney, which was designated as a hate group by the Southern Poverty Law Center. The SPLC encouraged Dermer to decline the award because it "not only further legitimizes this organization, but could be read as an endorsement of anti-Muslim hate by the Israeli government."

Dermer not only rejected the SPLC's criticism but also criticized the SPLC for singling out as anti-Muslim extremists Gaffney, Daniel Pipes, Maajid Nawaz, and especially Ayaan Hirsi Ali who publicly defends the rights of Muslim women. In his remarks, Dermer described "militant Islam" as a "virulent ideology now ascendant in the Muslim world" that must be defeated but also distinguished from Islam itself. On a separate occasion, Dermer distinguished between militant Islam and Islam more broadly, warning his audience that while militant Islamists aim to create a world in which “women are chattel, gays are hanged and minorities are either eliminated or persecuted” they must reject the idea that “the problem is Islam itself.” In fact, during his tenure, Dermer did outreach to the Muslim community, including hosting an annual Iftar dinner at the Ambassador's Residence at which he always made clear that he represented all of Israel's citizens including its more than 1.5 million Muslim citizens.

In September 2018, the Israeli Civil Service Commission began an investigation into Dermer's handling of information regarding possible sexual harassment issues related to an employee hired by the State, but the investigation was dropped.

=== Plan for the ethnic cleansing of Palestinians from Gaza ===
After the start of the Gaza war in October 2023, The Intercept reported that Netanyahu had tasked Dermer with designing plans to "thin" the Palestinian population in the Gaza Strip "to a minimum," the plan having two main elements: The first would use the pressure of the war and humanitarian crisis to persuade Egypt to allow refugees to flow to other Arab countries, and the second would open up sea routes so that Israel "allows a mass escape to European and African countries."

== Personal life ==
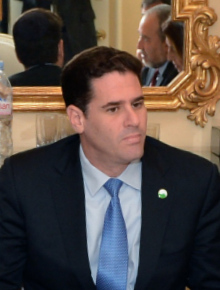
Ron Dermer in 2013

In 1996 he moved to Israel, and in 1997, he began the process of becoming an Israeli citizen. On 9 August 1998, Dermer married artist Adi Blumberg, the daughter of the chairman of the Bank of Jerusalem, who had grown up in the Old City of Jerusalem. The wedding was presided over by Rabbi Adin Steinsaltz. Adi Blumberg died in February 2000.

In December 2000, Dermer was introduced by Chief Justice Aharon Barak to Rhoda Pagano, a Yale University educated lawyer who was clerking at the time at the Israeli Supreme Court. They married in 2002 and have five children together. They live together in Jerusalem.

In Israel, he was a quarterback for the national American football team in international competitions and led his team to several championships in the Israeli Football League. In 2014, he was a member of the inaugural class of inductees into the Israeli Football Hall of Fame.

During his tenure as ambassador, Dermer visited the Pro Football Hall of Fame in Canton, Ohio, and helped organize, alongside New England Patriots owner Robert Kraft, a Pro Football Hall of Fame trip to Israel (2015), which was covered by CBS Sports and included Thurman Thomas and Tim Brown. A second Pro Football Hall of Fame Trip, covered by ESPN, occurred in 2017 and included Joe Montana, Roger Staubach, Jim Brown, Mike Singletary, "Mean" Joe Greene, and Bruce Smith.
