= Leonard Haber =

American psychologist and politician

28th Mayor of Miami Beach, Florida
- In office November 1, 1977 – November 6, 1979
- Preceded by: Harold Rosen
- Succeeded by: Murray Meyerson

Personal details
- Born: March 21, 1933 The Bronx, New York, U.S.
- Died: May 1, 2015 (aged 82) Miami, Florida, U.S.
- Spouse: Dr. Merry Haber
- Children: Michael, Daniel and Joseph Haber
- Parent(s): Sally and Max Haber
- Occupation: American psychologist, politician and radio show host

Leonard Haber (March 21, 1933 – May 1, 2015) was an American psychologist, politician, radio show host and Mayor of Miami Beach, Florida (1977–1979). He was a radio and TV news commentator.

== Biography ==
Haber was born on March 21, 1933, in The Bronx, New York City. Haber was one of three children of Sally and Max Haber. Her parents also have daughter Sandra and son Arnold. He was graduated from Bronx Community College. Haber was earned his Ph.D from Adelphi University in New York. From Adelphi University, Haber moved to Miami Beach and established his private practice. Haber was hosted in the popular radio show "At Your Service" on WKAT. Haber also served as the city psychologist for Miami Beach. Haber first joined the Miami Beach commission in 1971. Haber moved back to Miami in 2012. Haber died on May 1, 2015, at the age of 82. Memorial services were held at Temple Beth Sholom in Miami Beach.

== See also ==
- List of mayors of Miami Beach, Florida
