= Maccabee Task Force =

Nonprofit promoting Israel and opposing BDS measures

The Maccabee Task Force is a conservative Zionist organization operating with the aims of countering Boycott, Divestment and Sanctions movements on college campuses and promoting pro-Israel beliefs amongst young people. It was founded in part by conservative billionaires Sheldon Adelson and Miriam Adelson, who remains the group's president and chief benefactor.

== History ==
MTF was founded in 2015 with the Campus Maccabees Summit organized by Sheldon Adelson and Haim Saban. The summit was attended by representatives from 50 Jewish organizations and focused on confronting the BDS movement. Liberal Zionist organizations critical of BDS sanctions, such as Ameinu, where noted as not having been invited to attend the summit.

Initial organizers and funders such as Sheldon Adelson, Haim Saban, and Adam Milstein planned three components of the Campus Maccabees: donors for funding, on-campus activists to advocate on college campuses, and researchers to investigate Pro-Palestinian groups and identify opportunities for legal challenges. The focus would be on key groups in the BDS movement, such as Students for Justice in Palestine and Muslim Student Association.

Programming varied across campuses, but generally involved trips to Israel for mostly non-Jewish student leaders, activities to promote their objectives as well as coalition building with other organizations. Over the course of the academic year, a chapter would hold roughly 20 events.

For the 2015-2016 academic year, the organization concentrated its efforts on six California campuses, expanding to 20 in 2016-2017, 40 in 2017-2018, and 80 campuses, including five Canadian colleges, by 2018-2019. Brog announced at the end of the 2018–2019 school year that MTF would expand to over 100 schools. In 2019, MTF announced that it would expand internationally in 2020, though it did not specify to which countries. By the 2020 school year, MTF was planning to expand to approximately 100 college campuses in the United States. It is active on around 100 campuses in the United States and Canada.

== Management ==
Miriam Adelson is the MTF's president per their 990, but this is not lost listed on the organization's website. In 2024, Adelson's net worth was estimated at $32 billion, making her the richest Israeli and the 53rd-richest person in the world. She is the wife of the late Sheldon Adelson, a noted republican mega donor who had donate $200 million to Trump and the GOP for the 2020 election cycle. Following Sheldon's death in 2021, She became the third largest donor to Donald Trump's 2024 election bid, giving 106 million dollars in exchange for a commitment from Donald Trump to recognize Israeli annexation of the West Bank. Trump awarded her the Presidential Medal of Freedom in 2018.

David Brog, the then founding director of Christians United for Israel, was chosen as the MTF's first executive director following the Campus Maccabees Summit in 2015. Christians United for Israel is a Christian Zionist organization that was started by John Hagee.

Brog is often considered a protégé of American philanthropists Miriam and Sheldon Adelson, but people expressed surprise at his selection because his "background indicates a political position far from the mainstream of pro-Israel activism." He attended Harvard Law School, and practiced corporate law in the US and in Israel prior to his involvement in Christians United for Israel. He is Jewish.

== Funding of Hillels ==
During MTF's first two years of operation, the organization made donations to averaging more than $100,000 to more than 40 Hillel chapters the US and Canada. As a condition of receiving donations from the MTF, money from the organization cannot be used to fund activities associated with J Street U, a Liberal Zionist organization politically to the left of the MTF.

== Funding of travel to Israel for students and celebrities ==
The Maccabee foundation has partnered with media production companies, like Rova Media and Eight Productions, to fund trips to Israel for celebrities and create pro-Israel promotional materials. The trips bring "influencers here [to Israel] on visits to show the appropriate target audience there are things to do here, and that it’s fun" according to MTF's media department co-director Uriel Dison.

Ivanka Trump, Montana Tucker, James Maslow, Nathaniel Buzolic, Debra Messing, Michael Rapaport, Scooter Braun, Eve Harlow, and Kosha Dillz are noted as having participated in these trips for influential people/

Since at least 2018, MTF has been organizing trips to send primarily non-Jewish undergraduate student leaders to Israel. These trips are usually run in partnership with campus Hillels. A 2019 article in the progressive publication, Jewish Currents, alleged that the organization attempted to bring leaders of "diversity group[s]" such as such Black and Asian student unions. The article further alleged that the goal of MTF's trips has been to repair campus Hillels' relationship with progressive students and building a network of student government members who would counter proposed BDS measures on campus.

The MTF claimed that during the 2018–2019 school year the organization facilitated 74 Israel trips. Schools mentioned as having hosted such trips include the University of Minnesota, the University of Vermont, New York University, and Northwestern University. These trips have continued until at least 2024.

Since the attacks of October 7 attacks, MTF has continued hosting trips with celebrities and influencers. Uriel Dison has said that the goals of the trips have shifted, and that now the purpose was to turn participating influencers into "wartime ambassadors."

== Commentary on Mahmoud Khalil and Columbia University ==
Following the Detention of Mahmoud Khalil, a graduate student at Columbia University who had helped to organize protests against the University's Zionist politics, but was not wanted for a crime, the MTF claimed that Khalil was a “Hamas supporter,” who had "came to the US to promote chaos and destruction.” and claimed that deporting him would be a "step in the right direction" in a now deleted Facebook post.

== Online media operations ==
MTF was a major funder of Act.IL, a defunct social networking service used by supporters of Israel to oppose online "anti-Israel content" such as the boycott, divestment and sanctions movement (BDS). Its activities were referred to as "an online propaganda campaign" and "a virtual situation room of pro-Israel experts".

According to a 2019 article in the Los Angeles Times, MTF is a major donor to PragerU, a conservative visual media site co-founded in 2009 by screenwriter Allen Estrin and talk show host Dennis Prager. Members of MTF, including Brog, have appeared in PragerU videos.
