= David Brog =

American pro-Israel conservative activist

Personal details
- Born: 1965 or 1966 (age 60–61) Margate City, New Jersey, U.S.
- Party: Republican
- Education: Princeton University (BA); Harvard University (JD)

David Brog (born 1965/1966) is an American conservative activist and the former executive director of Christians United for Israel (CUFI), a pro-Israel Christian organization.

== Career ==
After graduating from Harvard Law School, Brog served as an executive at America Online and practiced corporate law both in Israel and the United States. In the early 1990s, Brog practiced in Israel.

Afterwards he worked in the United States Senate for seven years, where he eventually became the chief of staff to Senator Arlen Specter and staff director of the Senate Judiciary Committee.

Brog is often considered a protégé of American philanthropists Miriam and Sheldon Adelson. In July 2015, Brog was tapped to head a new group called Maccabee Task Force, an entity formed by the Adelsons and fellow philanthropist Haim Saban to combat Boycott, Divestment and Sanctions activities on college campuses. Brog was seen as a surprising choice due to his position far from the mainstream within pro-Israel position, according to a Jewish organizational official speaking to The Forward in 2015. Nonetheless, the official found Brog's past success in organizational development explanatory regarding his appointment.

According to David Krone, Harry Reid's chief of staff, Brog was key in securing House Republican support for the Antisemitism Awareness Act, which passed in 2016.

He co-founded the Edmund Burke Foundation with Yoram Hazony. As part of that foundation's work, Hazony and Brog organized the National Conservatism Conference. They hoped to develop the frame the development and growth of conservatism through the conference.

=== Christians United For Israel leadership ===
Brog helped found Christians United For Israel (CUFI), an American pro-Israel Christian organization. CUFI founder and San Antonio-based Pentecostal preacher John Hagee hired Brog in 2006. Hagee did so as a solution to his organization's lack of pull in political circles; with Brog's political connections and ability, Hagee hoped to extend influence from the familiar broadcast radio to the unfamiliar Washington, D.C.

Brog said in 2015 that his first task upon joining CUFI was to tap into existing bases of Christian Zionist support. Around 2015, the organization was exploring the idea of expanded political engagement, whether through Washington office focused on lobbying or through the development of a political action committee.

According to Sander Gerber, a major player in the passage of the Taylor Force Act, a bill passed in 2018 that halted aid to the Palestinian Authority until it stops paying the families of deceased terrorists, Brog played a role in the bill's passage. Brog brought CUFI into the lobbying effort to pass the bill, bringing evangelical groups on board long before Jewish groups entered the arena, according to Gerber.

=== 2022 Republican Nevada congressional primary ===
In 2022, Brog ran for Republican Congressional nominee in Nevada's 1st congressional district. He lost in an eight-way race, finishing second with 17% to former Army colonel Mark Robertson's 30%. Brog announced his entry into the race in February and raised $284,000 in the first six weeks, including a $50k loan to himself. By June, Brog had spent $187k. His campaign spent $59k on mail advertisements and $88.5k on "media placements". This left his campaign with $174k in remaining cash at that point. By that point in the campaign, Brog had received endorsements from Genie Energy PAC, the Hindu American PAC, and former U.S. Secretary of State Mike Pompeo.

Brog described "securing our Southern border and finishing Trump's border wall" as among his top priorities.

== Education and early life ==
Brog was born in Margate City, New Jersey, a community near Atlantic City. His parents were largely secular, his father Eugene attending synagogue only for the high holidays. His Zionism was fostered after reading The Revolt by Menachem Begin while a student at Atlantic City High School.

Brog attended Princeton University for his bachelor's degree. He graduated from Harvard Law School in 1991.

== Personal life ==
He is a cousin of former Prime Minister of Israel Ehud Barak, whose original surname was also "Brog" until he Hebraized it to Barak in 1972. He is married to an Israeli-American woman.

Brog is Jewish. He occasionally attends his local Orthodox synagogues, Young Israel Aish HaTorah and Chabad. He does not work on Shabbat. Before moving to Nevada, Brog lived in Texas.

== Views ==
Brog says he was a Democrat until law school.

In 2014, Brog expressed concern in Middle East Quarterly that traditional reflexive American evangelical Christian support for Israel was waning.

== Books ==
- Reclaiming Israel's History: Roots, Rights, and the Struggle for Peace (2017)
- In Defense of Faith: The Judeo-Christian Idea and the Struggle for Humanity (2010)
- Standing With Israel: Why Christians Support the Jewish State (2006)

Brog's Standing With Israel is an attempt to establish Christian Zionists as both allies to the Jewish people and not motivated by replacement theology. Brog details in four chapters how Christian Zionists aided in the establishment of the State of Israel. He poses modern Zionist evangelicals as the heirs to the righteous gentiles of World War II. Nikolas K. Gvosdev says in his review for the Journal of Church and State that the book "suffers from the fact that its author wants to make definitive statements on a variety of issues while ignoring inconvenient details", a byproduct of the book's nature as a political polemic. Brog's primary audience is other members of the Jewish community.
