= Act.IL =

Israeli social networking app

Act-IL
- Developer: Interdisciplinary Center Herzliya
- Initial release: June 2017
- Platform: iOS, Android, web browser
- Available in: 11 languages
- Type: social networking service
- Website: https://app.act-il.com/

Act.IL (also Act-IL) is a social networking service used by supporters of Israel to oppose online "anti-Israel content" such as the boycott, divestment and sanctions movement (BDS). Its activities were referred to as "an online propaganda campaign" and "a virtual situation room of pro-Israel experts".

Act.IL directed its users to "missions" to like, comment on, and share pro-Israel material on social media. It also asked users to flag, report, and respond to criticisms of Israel. Users were guided on how to respond, which might entail writing a reply using the provided talking points, or sharing or upvoting an allied comment. The app also provided users with ready-made memes promoting Israel's perspective for them to share. By completing missions users earned points, unlocked badges, and had their scores displayed on leaderboards.

== History ==
According to +972, Act.Il was the centerpiece of a digital campaign called 4IL ('For Israel') announced in 2017 by Gilad Erdan, then the Minister of Strategic Affairs, for the promotion of Israel and delegitimization of Boycott, Divestment and Sanctions (BDS). The Act.Il app would assign users 'missions' to challenge social media posts it considered to be critical of Israel or in favor of the BDS movement. Erdan called it an "Iron Dome of truth."

Act-IL was a joint project of the private Israeli university IDC Herzliya and the US-based Israeli-American Council. The Maccabee Task Force, one of Sheldon Adelson's foundations, is a major funder of Act.IL. The organization behind Act.IL is staffed by former intelligence officers and has a collegial relationship with the Israeli Intelligence Community. It had a close relationship with Israel's Ministry of Strategic Affairs which combats the BDS movement which it views as a threat.

According to Mondoweiss, an email sent in March 2022 to the app's users announced that the app will be shut down but that users should continue to interact with Act.IL's content on its other social media platforms.

The application was relaunched in early 2026 under the name RiseApp with the former Act.IL owners partnering with Reichman University for the release and also transferring the former Act.IL userbase to the new service.

== See also ==
- Hasbara
- Megaphone desktop tool
- Internet activism
