= John Hale Levi =

Miami Beach Mayor

Miami Beach City Commissioner
- In office 1918–1947

13th Mayor of Miami Beach
- In office 1944–1945
- Preceded by: Mitchell Wolfson
- Succeeded by: Herbert A. Frink

10th Mayor of Miami Beach
- In office 1937–1941
- Preceded by: Louis F Snedigar
- Succeeded by: Val C. Cleary

Personal details
- Born: September 16, 1875
- Died: January 26, 1948 (aged 72) Miami, Florida, US
- Profession: Engineer

John Hale Levi (1875–1948) was an engineer and politician who served as the City of Miami Beach's 10th and 13th mayor.

Levi was revered for his contributions to the creation of the island and city of Miami Beach.

Born in West Virginia, he studied at the Pratt Institue in New York.

Hale became an engineer with the Consolidated Ship Company. On a trip through South Florida to meet entrepreneur, Carl Fisher in 1912, he ended up in Biscayne Bay, off the coast of Miami. Levi proposed the idea of dredging the bay bottom to make a usable island from the mangrove that was Miami Beach at the time.

He and Fisher along with the Lummus brothers and John S Collins built the infrastructure that started the land boom on Miami Beach.

Levi was in charge of Fisher's developments which were to include man-made islands, hotels, polo fields, golf courses, streets and entire subdivisions until Fisher passed away in 1938.

== Politics ==
Levi was elected to the city council in 1918. He earned the position of 10th and 13th mayor of Miami Beach. He was on the Miami Beach city council for over 27 years.

He became director of the Miami Beach First National Bank.

“They say Carl Fisher was the father of the beach, and that I am the son of the beach,” he told Time Magazine in 1940.

Levi died of complications from pneumonia in 1948.

== See also ==
- Miami Beach Mayors
- Miami Beach timeline
- Miami Beach government

Political offices
Preceded by Mitchell Wolfson	Mayor of the City of Miami Beach; 1944-1945	Succeeded by Herbert A. Frink
Preceded by Louis F Snedigar	Mayor of the City of Miami Beach; 1937-1941	Succeeded by Val C. Cleary
