= Steven Meiner =

American politician (born 1970 or 1971)

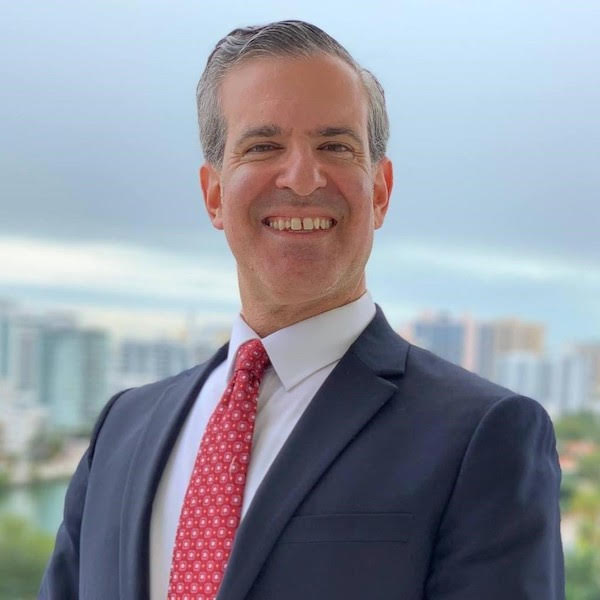

39th Mayor of Miami Beach, Florida
- Incumbent
- Assumed office November 28, 2023
- Preceded by: Dan Gelber

Personal details
- Born: 1970 or 1971 (age 54–55) Brooklyn, New York, U.S.
- Party: Independent (since 2018)
- Other political affiliations: Republican (until 2018)
- Education: Brooklyn Law School, Brooklyn College
- Website: Official website

Steven Meiner (born 1970 or 1971) is an American politician and mayor of Miami Beach. He previously served as a Commissioner of Miami Beach and an attorney for the Securities and Exchange Commission, which he left amidst sexual misconduct allegations.

== Early life and family ==
Meiner was born in a Jewish family in Brooklyn, New York. His father, Sheldon Meiner, worked as an agent for the Internal Revenue Service. His mother, Dorothy Weiss, was a public school teacher.

== Career ==
In 2007, Meiner moved to Miami Beach where he joined the United States Securities and Exchange Commission (SEC) as a civil law enforcement attorney. During his time in the position, multiple female staff complained about inappropriate behavior and unwanted sexual advances. One of the women lodged an official complaint prompting an internal review in 2016. In an earlier incident, Meiner tried to kiss a female staffer who joined him for dinner. In 2019, Meiner won a seat on the City Commission of Miami Beach. In February 2024, it was reported that the SEC was investigating Meiner over the alleged sexual harassment. In July 2024, Meiner resigned from the SEC after 17 years at the agency's Miami office.

=== Mayor of Miami Beach ===
Meiner ran for mayor without a party affiliation to succeed Dan Gelber, who was term limited. After the general election, he was opposed by former City Commissioner Michael Góngora. When asked during the campaign about allegations of inappropriate workplace sexual activity, Meiner blamed the reports on antisemitism and claimed that his former SEC colleagues were motivated by his pro-Israel stance. Meiner won with approximately 54% of the votes, with approximately 10,000 ballots cast.

In March 2024, following several pro-Palestinian demonstrations, Meiner successfully pushed for a resolution for the city to set stricter parameters on planned protests, sparking criticism. In March 2025, Meiner attempted to end the lease of a cinema that met in Miami Beach's Old City Hall after they screened the film "No Other Land", a documentary about the Israel-Palestine conflict. Meiner criticized the film as a "false one-sided propaganda attack on the Jewish people", before freedom of speech concerns prompted him to back down from his threat against the lease.

On November 4, 2025, Meiner was reelected to a second consecutive term.

In January 2026, following a complaint from Meiner to the Police Chief, Miami Beach Police Department officers visited a resident who criticized Meiner via a Facebook comment. The resident commented that Meiner had "call[ed] for the death of all Palestinians". According to the officers, they were looking for the commenter because that person's words could "probably incite somebody to do something bad." The resident who made the comment told The Washington Post that having police visit her over the comment "felt like such a foreign, alien feeling." The Foundation for Individual Rights and Expression said the visit chilled "the exercise of First Amendment rights and undermines public confidence in the department’s commitment to respecting civil liberties and the United States Constitution."

In January 2026, Meiner condemned right-wing influencers including Clavicular, Nick Fuentes, Sneako, Myron Gaines and Andrew Tate singing along to "Heil Hitler" at the Miami Beach nightclub Vendôme and questioned how they gained access to the venue. Meiner subsequently launched an investigation of the nightclub.

== Personal life ==
Meiner is an Orthodox Jew and wears a yarmulke. He is married to his wife, Shayna, and has two children. He has resided in Miami Beach since 2007.

== See also ==
- List of mayors of Miami Beach, Florida

Political offices
Preceded by Dan Gelber	Mayor of Miami Beach; 2023–present	Incumbent
