= 2011 Miami Beach mayoral election =

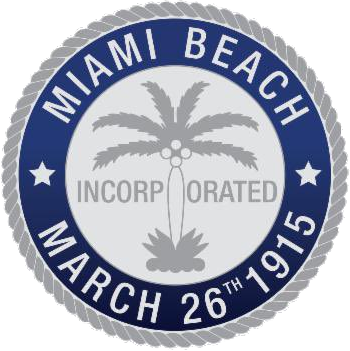
- November 1, 2011
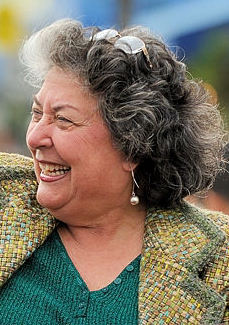

Nominee	Matti Herrera Bower	Steve Berke	Dave Crystal
Party	Democratic	After Party	Republican
Popular vote	4,103	1,614	895
Percentage	59.44%	23.38%	12.97%
Mayor before election
Matti Herrera Bower
Democratic
Elected mayor
Matti Herrera Bower
Democratic

The 2011 Miami Beach mayoral election, a nonpartisan race, was held on Tuesday, November 1, 2011. Incumbent Mayor Matti Herrera Bower, who was first elected in 2007, won a third and final two-year term. She was challenged by three opponents.

== Candidates ==
- Matti Herrera Bower, age 72 - incumbent Mayor of Miami Beach since 2007. (Democratic Party)
- Steve Berke, age 30 - Comedian and entrepreneur. (After Party)
- Dave Crystal, age 34 - Entrepreneur (Republican Party)
- Laura Rivero Levey, age 46 - Public relations professional (Republican Party)

== General election ==
Miami Beach Mayoral election, 2011
Party	Candidate	Votes	%
Democratic	Matti Herrera Bower (incumbent)	4,103	59.44
After Party	Steve Berke	1,614	23.38
Republican	Dave Crystal	895	12.97
Republican	Laura R. Levey	291	4.22
Total votes		6,903	100.00
