= Thomas E. James =

American politician

Thomas Edward James Jr

3rd Mayor of Miami Beach
- Preceded by: T.J. Pancoast
- Succeeded by: L.F. Snedigar

Personal details
- Born: 1872
- Died: 1936 (aged 63–64) Miami, Florida
- Resting place: St Petersburg, Fl.

Thomas Edward James Jr (1872–1936) was an American politician who served as the third Mayor of Miami Beach, Florida.

James was the son of a pastor. He was raised in the area of Tampa, Fl. and worked for the Havana-American Company.

Before moving to Miami, he married Lula Lummus, the sister of J.N. Lummus Sr., a man who would later become a pioneer of and the first Mayor of Miami Beach, Fl

James was a banker later in life.

Notably, his daughter, Mrs. Mary James Herin, was a charter member of a Methodist church in Miami Beach.

James is buried in St Petersburg, Fl.

== See also ==
- Miami Beach Mayors
