= Alex Daoud =

American politician (1943–2025)

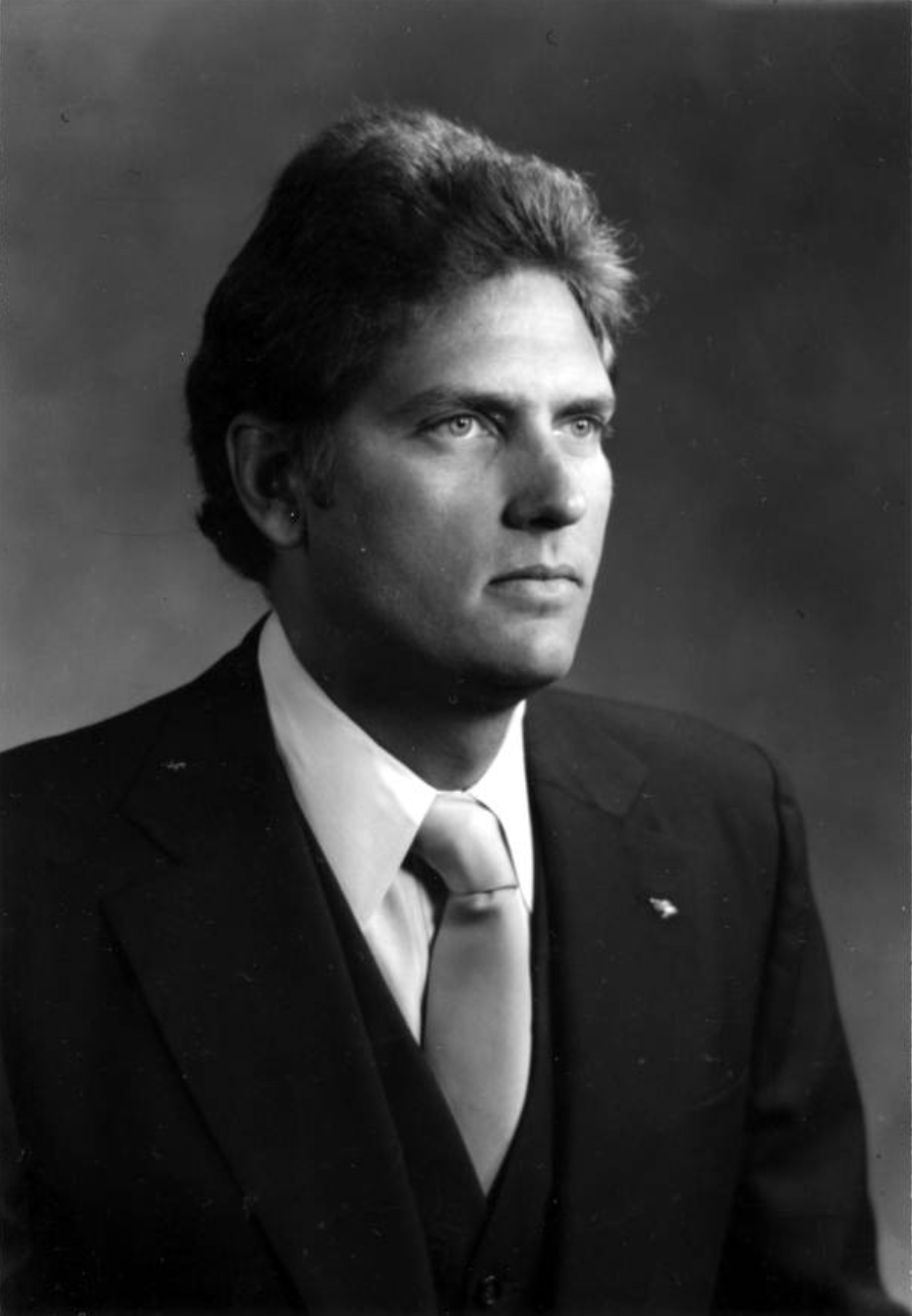

32nd Mayor of Miami Beach, Florida
- In office November 5, 1985 – October 31, 1991 (suspended from office)
- Preceded by: Malcolm Fromberg
- Succeeded by: Stanley H. Arkin (acting)

Personal details
- Born: May 19, 1943 Miami Beach, Florida, U.S.
- Died: March 15, 2025 (aged 81)

Arnold Alex Daoud (May 19, 1943 – March 15, 2025) was an American attorney, politician and author who served as the mayor of Miami Beach, Florida, from 1985 to 1991.

== Life and career ==
Alex Daoud was born on May 19, 1943, in the city of Miami Beach, where he also grew up. His grandparents were Greek Orthodox and Greek Catholic immigrants from Lebanon. His mother, the youngest woman to pass the New York bar exam in the early 1920s, and his father, an antiques dealer, moved from New York to Florida during World War II. At the age of six, Daoud contracted polio; he was in a wheelchair for six months and later needed braces and crutches, but he eventually recovered without lifelong disability.

Daoud, an attorney, was an associate in the law firm of Galbut Galbut and Menin, although he reportedly did little legal work for them, focusing on public service. He served as a Miami City Attorney, then was elected to the Miami Beach City Commission in 1979. He was re-elected to a second term in 1981 and then a third term in 1983. In 1985, he became the first Roman Catholic to be elected Mayor of Miami Beach. In 1987, he won re-election by 86% of the popular vote. In 1989, he was re-elected to an unprecedented third consecutive term as Mayor of Miami Beach and became the first mayor in city history to serve five or more consecutive years. During his tenure as mayor, he promoted tourism and Miami Beach transformed from a beachfront city to a center of partying and fashion. However, on October 29, 1991, he was indicted on federal bribery charges. He admitted to receiving bribes from developers in return for political influence and city council votes, as well as soliciting free work on his house from contractors seeking city business. He was convicted of bribery in 1992 and of other corruption crimes in 1993. He served 17 months in federal prison, followed by three years of probation. He testified against many of the people who had paid him in bribes.

In 2007, he wrote a book (published by Pegasus publishing house)Sins of South Beach: The True Story of Corruption, Violence, Murder and the Making of Miami Beach, which "chronicles the sex, violence and corruption of his time in public office." It is an autobiographical depiction of Miami Beach in the 1980s, a "retirement ghetto" plagued by rampant crime, and its regeneration into a premier vacation and nightlife destination. He described how crime was reduced by "attitude adjustment sessions," in which police would severely beat known criminals and then dump them in Miami across the causeway. Daoud is survived by his children Alexis, Alexander, and Kelly.

Daoud died on March 15, 2025, at the age of 81.

== See also ==
- List of mayors of Miami Beach, Florida
