= John Newton Lummus Jr. =

American politician

Dade County Tax Assesor
- In office 1929–1953

5th Mayor of Miami Beach
- In office 1926–1928
- Preceded by: Louis F Snedigar
- Succeeded by: Louis F Snedigar

Personal details
- Born: 7 Feb 1899 Tampa, Florida, U.S.
- Died: 18 Feb 1983 (aged 84) Miami, Florida, U.S.
- Spouse: Martha Ford Lummus
- Children: John Newton Lummus III

Military service
- Branch/service: United States Army
- Rank: Major
- Battles/wars: WWI and WWII

John Newton Lummus Jr.(1899-1983) was a banker, public servant and the City of Miami Beach's fifth mayor.

== Early years ==
Lummus, the son of Alice and J.N. Lummus Sr graduated from Miami High. He attended the Staunton Military Academy in Virginia, a military school with a number of distinguished alumni.

Lummus was drafted into World War I in 1918.

After the war, Lummus followed the paths of his father and uncle. The Lummus brothers were businessmen and bank presidents. J.E. Lummus was president of the Bank of Biscayne Bay. J.N. Lummus Sr was president of Southern Bank and Trust. J.E. Lummus was 2nd Mayor of Miami. J.N. Lummus Sr was the first mayor of Miami Beach.

== Career ==
Lummus Jr married Martha Low Fort in 1924. He was Vice President of Southern Bank and Trust when his son, John Newton Lummus III was born. She was a columnist for the Miami Daily News.

Lummus Jr was a Miami Beach City councilman when he became the youngest mayor of the City of Miami Beach in 1926 at age 27.

After the great Miami Hurricane of 1926 and the failed Florida land boom, Miami and Miami Beach were trying to recover economically. Famous mobster, Al Capone showed interest in buying a house in the area. This caused the greatest uproar in Lummus' tenure as mayor.

In a controversial move, Lummus Jr., not only welcomed Capone to Miami Beach — he helped the gangster acquire the Palm Island property.

At the end of his term, Lummus handed the reigns back to his predecessor, Louis F Snedigar, who eventually became Miami Beach's longest serving mayor.

After his contentious service in Miami Beach, Lummus became the Dade County Tax assessor, a position which he held from 1929 to 1953, except during his service in World War II. His times as assessor would be notable as well. Lummus and a property developer ended up in a fist fight at a property valuation appeal hearing in 1947. The developer lost his appeal.

== Civic affiliations ==
Lummus was active in the Boy Scouts and the Key Club. He was a member of the Kiwanis Club.

He passed away in 1983 and is buried at Woodlawn North, Miami.

== See also ==
- Miami Beach Mayors
- Miami Beach timeline
- Miami Beach government
