= Thomas J. Pancoast =

American businessman and politician (1865-1941)

Thomas Jessup Pancoast
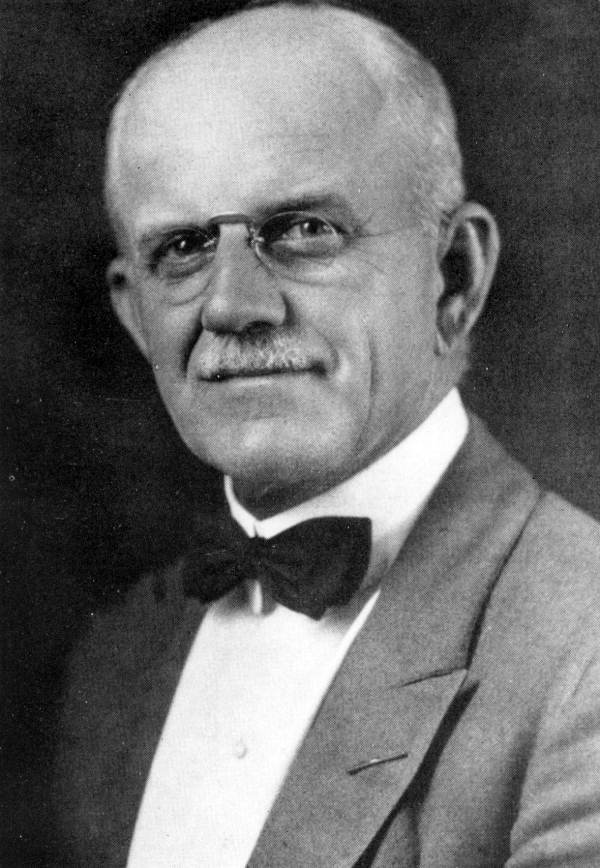
- Portrait c. 1900

2nd Mayor of Miami Beach, Florida
- In office 1918–1920
- Preceded by: J.N. Lummus
- Succeeded by: Thomas E James

Personal details
- Born: 13 July 1865 Moorestown, New Jersey, US
- Died: 16 September 1941 (aged 76) Moorestown, New Jersey, US
- Resting place: Woodlawn Park, Miami
- Spouse: Katharine Rogers Collins
- Children: 6, including Russell

Thomas Jessup "T.J." Pancoast was a developer, businessman and second mayor of Miami Beach, Florida, from 1918 to 1920.

== Life ==
Born in New Jersey, he was a member of the firm of Collins and Pancoast of Merchantville, builders' and farmers' supplies, from 1888 to 1912. He also served as president of the First National Bank of Merchantville from 1911 to 1912. He was neighbor to John Collins in New Jersey, and became his son-in-law after marrying Collins' daughter, Katharine Rogers Collins in 1889.

The Pancoasts moved to Florida 1912.

The Pancoasts had six children. Two of them, Josiah Arthur Pancoast and Russell Pancoast featured prominently in the development of Miami Beach. Russell T. Pancoast, was architect for several buildings on Miami Beach and throughout Florida. Arthur Pancoast built the Pancoast Hotel and was famously a cattle breeder.

The Pancoasts built the Miami Beach Casino during 1912 and 1913 on the ocean at 23rd Street.

T. J. Pancoast was elected 2nd Mayor of Miami Beach in 1918, succeeding his business partner J.N. Lummus.

He was president of the Miami Beach Bay Shore Co., the First National Bank of Miami Beach and the Pancoast Hotel Co.

Pancoast was elected as the first president of the Miami Beach Chamber of Commerce in 1921, he remained at its head for 20 years.

He died in 1941.

== Civic activities and affiliations ==
Pancoast was president of the Miami Beach Museum and Zoological Garden. He was president of the Miami Beach Golf Club and an active Rotary Club member.

== See also ==
- Miami Beach Mayors
