= Val C. Cleary =

American businessman and politician

Miami Dade County Commissioner
- In office 1944–1948
- Succeeded by: Louis F. Snedigar

11th Mayor of Miami Beach
- In office 1941–1943
- Preceded by: John H Levi
- Succeeded by: Mitchell Wolfson

7th Mayor of Miami Beach
- In office 1930–1932
- Preceded by: Louis F. Snedigar
- Succeeded by: Arthur Frank Katzentine

Personal details
- Born: 1882
- Died: 1966 (aged 83–84)
- Spouse: Grace E Cleary
- Occupation: Actor, Real estate broker

Val C. Cleary (1882–1966) was an actor, real estate broker and politician who became two-time mayor of Miami Beach, Florida.

== Early life ==
Cleary was an actor before moving to Florida. He was married to Grace Cleary.

Cleary famously bought a property on Miami Beach for $800 and sold it four years later for $150,000.

== Politics ==
Cleary had a number of political positions throughout his career. He was a tax assessor. He was elected Miami Beach Mayor and also selected as Mayor by the city council. He was an at-large delegate to the 1932 national Democratic Party convention, where they elected Franklin Delano Roosevelt in 1932. He was a county commissioner and was also a member of the state delegation that changed the state constitution to eliminate Prohibition. He also lost several races, including the 1948 County Commission seat for District 5.

== Electoral results ==
General election, Miami, FL 1948, County Commission, District 5

Candidate	Votes
Cleary	24,435
Louis F. Snedigar	27,921

== Fraternal and civic affiliations ==
Cleary was a Freemason, charter member of the Lion's Club, an Elk and commander of Miami's Harvey W Seeds American Legion Post #29.

== See also ==
- Miami Beach Mayors
- Miami Beach timeline
- Miami Beach government
