= Louis F. Snedigar =

American businessman and politician (1890-1951)

Louis Fielding "Red" Snedigar
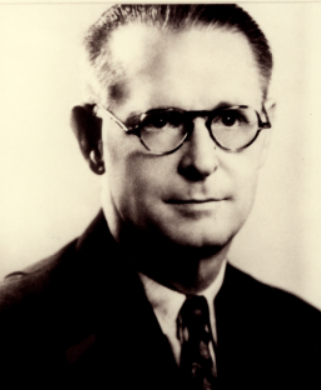

Miami Dade County Commissioner
- In office 1949–1951

9th Mayor of Miami Beach
- In office 1934–1937
- Preceded by: Arthur Frank Katzentine
- Succeeded by: John H. Levi

6th Mayor of Miami Beach
- In office 1928–1930
- Preceded by: John Newton Lummus Jr.
- Succeeded by: Val C Cleary

4th Mayor of Miami Beach
- In office 1922–1926
- Preceded by: Thomas E James
- Succeeded by: John Newton Lummus Jr.

Personal details
- Born: 2 January 1890
- Died: 9 December 1951 (aged 61) Miami Beach, Florida, U.S.
- Resting place: Miami
- Spouse: Edna Morris
- Children: Louis F. Snedigar Jr., James Snedigar
- Occupation: Attorney

Military service
- Allegiance: United States Army
- Unit: BCo 7th Bn Florida State Guard

Louis Fielding "Red" Snedigar (1890–1951) was an attorney, realtor and four-time mayor of the city of Miami Beach.

== Early life ==
Snedigar was the son of a Union Civil War veteran. He was born in Bartow, FL.

He married Edna Morris on May 24, 1916, in Deland, Florida. He later graduated from Stetson University where he played baseball while earning a law degree. Snedigar had a .420 batting average and was signed to a contract by the Philadelphia Athletics. Snedigar later credited major league legend, Connie Mack with dissuading him from a baseball career.

The Snedigars had two sons. When they settled in Miami, Louis worked as a lawyer with Shutts & Bowen and moonlighted as a semi-professional shortstop. for the Miami East Coast League baseball team

== Politics ==
Snedigar was the fourth, sixth and ninth Mayor of Miami Beach. In a letter he wrote to the mayor and city council in the late 1940s, Snedigar remarked that he had been the leader of the city through "the boom, the bust, the Wall Street panic and, 'the blow'", referring to the great Miami Hurricane of 1926.

During Snedigar's terms as mayor, he oversaw the installation of the city water system and the sewer system, the procurement of multiple parks and the building of multiple bridges. Notably, the Miami Beach City Hall was built under his tenure.

Snedigar was never a Miami Beach city council member prior to his election victories.

In his 1928 election victory, he defeated Val C. Cleary by only four votes. He retired after the 1930 election.

In 1934, John H. Levi withdrew from the mayoral race, citing a technicality in the city charter. Snedigar announced his candidacy just a few hours later and went on to win his third term.

After his service to Miami Beach, Snedigar ran for and won a Dade County Commission seat.

== Later life ==
During World War II, Snedigar's enlistment was declined. He joined the Florida State Guard and the Coast Guard volunteers. Snedigar's sons, Louis Jr. and James, went on to be decorated WWII veterans.

Snedigar died in Miami Beach in 1951.

== See also ==
- Miami Beach Mayors
- Miami Beach timeline
- Miami Beach government
