= Philip Levine (politician) =

American politician

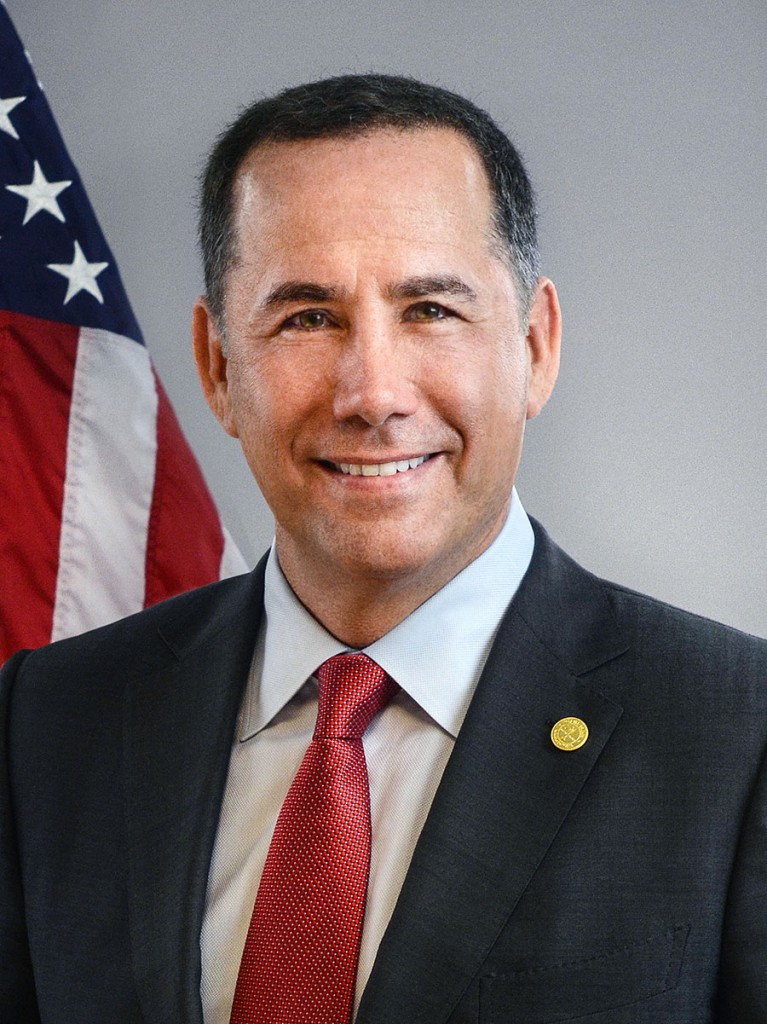

37th Mayor of Miami Beach
- In office November 25, 2013 – November 13, 2017
- Preceded by: Matti Herrera Bower
- Succeeded by: Dan Gelber

Personal details
- Born: Philip Louis Levine; February 18, 1962 (age 64) Brookline, Massachusetts, U.S.
- Party: Democratic
- Spouse: Carolina Murciano (m. 2018)
- Education: University of Michigan, Ann Arbor (BA)
- Website: Campaign website

Philip Louis Levine (born February 18, 1962) is an American businessman and politician who served as Mayor of Miami Beach from 2013 to 2017. A member of the Democratic Party, he was a candidate in the 2018 Florida gubernatorial election.

Levine was mentioned multiple times in documents related to Jeffrey Epstein released by the US Department of Justice.

== Background ==
Philip Levine was born in 1962 to a Jewish family in Boston, Massachusetts. They moved to South Florida when he was 10. He attended Attucks Middle School and Hollywood Hills High School in Hollywood, Florida.

Levine headed north for college, graduating from the University of Michigan with a degree in Political Science. After college, he settled in Miami Beach, Florida. In addition to building a business career, he has been involved in many philanthropic and community organizations.

In 2015, Levine completed an advanced leadership program at The Fletcher School of Law and Diplomacy at Tufts University. In 2018, he married Carolina Murciano. The marriage is his first and her second. Together, they have an infant son.

== Professional career ==
In 1990, with $500 in capital, Levine launched Onboard Media in a studio apartment above the News Café on Ocean Drive. Conceived as a port-marketing program for the cruise industry, the company expanded to publish eighty-five in-stateroom magazines and to produce TV programming.

After growing Onboard Media into a multi-million-dollar company, Levine partnered with Berkshire Partners to acquire Starboard Cruise Services. The merger resulted in the world's largest cruise industry concessionaire. It was sold to Louis Vuitton Moët Hennessy in 2000.

Levine maintains a diverse portfolio of investments in startups, businesses, and real estate. He is also the CEO of Royal Media Partners, an exclusive partner of Royal Caribbean Cruises Ltd. Levine also hosts The Mayor, a regular radio show on Sirius XM that features discussions with elected officials and other figures on a variety of relevant topics.

== Political involvement ==
In 2010, Levine was selected by President Obama's Secretary of Commerce to serve on a Task Force advising on U.S. tourism. The goals of the task force were to grow America's tourism industry. Levine is a self-described "radical centrist." He criticized President Trump's delayed response for hurricane relief in Puerto Rico after Hurricane Maria.

=== Mayoral tenure ===
In November 2013, Levine was elected Mayor of Miami Beach, receiving 50.48% of the total vote in a four-person race. His campaign was endorsed by former President Bill Clinton and U.S. Senator Bill Nelson. Levine ran on a platform of "Just Get It Done," focusing on fixing street flooding and combating sea level rise, cleaning up government corruption, reforming the police department and city finances, and placing a priority on constituent service.

In June 2017, Levine hosted the annual U.S. Conference of Mayors in Miami Beach. The event brought together over 300 mayors from across the country and was the first Conference of Mayors held in the city since 1962.

=== Climate change ===
During his tenure as Miami Beach Mayor, Levine advocated publicly for action and attention to the issues of climate change. Levine worked to implement solutions to sea-level rise in Miami Beach, such as installing new drainage systems, investing in cutting-edge pumps, and physically raising roads. In 2016, he appeared in Leonardo DiCaprio's documentary Before the Flood and in an episode of the National Geographic Channel series Years of Living Dangerously, hosted by Jack Black, to discuss the current effects of sea-level rise in Miami Beach and across Florida.

Before Levine took over as mayor, Miami Beach had a begun a 20-year, $200 million program to combat sea-level rise with new pumps, drain pipes and sea walls. According to the Miami Herald, When Levine took office, his first move to mitigate flooding was a $11 million contract for three storm pumps along Alton Road, around the area where Levine owns real estate. That area had one of the lowest sea-levels in the entire City and suffered from the most flooding. The Herald also reported that later, Levine fast-tracked a plan to raise roads in the Sunset Harbour neighborhood. He and partners owned real estate there worth about $20 million. In Levine's two terms as mayor, the city signed close to $40 million in no-bid contracts, extensions, and change orders to stop flooding.

=== 2018 gubernatorial candidacy ===
Levine ran for the Democratic nomination for Governor of Florida in the 2018 election but lost in a crowded primary field. His gubernatorial platform included environmentalism, living wages, better public schools, gun safety policies and social equality; he was endorsed by the Miami Herald. He finished third behind eventual nominee, Tallahassee Mayor Andrew Gillum, and former U.S. Representative Gwen Graham. In the four-person primary held on August 28, Gillum won with 34.3% of the vote. Levine came in third with 20.3% of the vote. Levine spent $29 million of his own money in the race. The money spent was reportedly about one-fifth of his total net worth.

=== Philanthropy ===
Levine serves on the board of directors for Best Buddies International, the Miami-based nonprofit organization that creates opportunities for people with developmental disabilities. In the aftermath of Hurricane Maria in September 2017, he personally chartered a plane to deliver emergency relief supplies to Puerto Rico.

== Connection to Jeffrey Epstein ==
Upon the release of the Epstein files, Levine's connection to Epstein was revealed to be closer than he previously admitted. In June 2026, after Sarah Kellen, a close aide to Epstein, accused Levine of sexual abuse during a testimony to the House oversight committee, a letter was sent to the Justice Department to investigate.

== See also ==
- List of mayors of Miami Beach, Florida

Political offices
Preceded by Matti Herrera Bower	Mayor of Miami Beach; 2013–2017	Succeeded by Dan Gelber
