= Matti Herrera Bower =

American politician

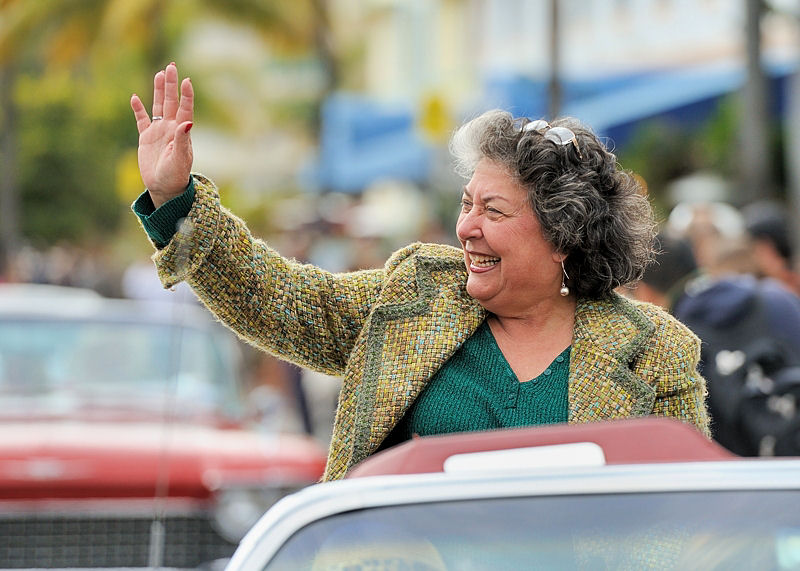

36th Mayor of Miami Beach
- In office November 21, 2007 – November 25, 2013
- Preceded by: David Dermer
- Succeeded by: Philip Levine

Personal details
- Born: April 4, 1939 (age 87) Cuba
- Party: Democratic
- Spouse: Richard Bower
- Children: 4 daughters
- Profession: Politician, retired dental assistant

Matilde "Matti" Herrera Bower is a Cuban-American politician and retired dental assistant. Bower has been elected to three two-year terms as the Mayor of Miami Beach, Florida, beginning in 2007. Most recently, because of a loophole in the term limits rule, Bower was able to run for an open commission seat but lost by a considerably large margin in the run-off race against retired banker Joy Malakoff. Bower won re-election to her third and final term as mayor on November 1, 2011. She is the first woman, as well as the first Hispanic, to serve as mayor of Miami Beach. She is a Democrat, though the Miami Beach elections are nonpartisan.

Bower was born in Cuba and immigrated to the United States. She attended Miami Technical High School and became a dental assistant. Bower also spent decades as a local activist and preservationist, including advocating for the successful preservation of the Miami Beach Architectural District.

Bower served as a Miami Beach city commissioner from 1999 to 2007 before being elected mayor of the South Florida city in 2007. She won re-election to a second term in 2009. The city of Miami Beach received a bond rating upgrade in 2010 and saw a balanced budget that same year under Bower. However, pension costs have risen to more than $50 million in 2011, up from just $3.5 million in 2000. She has also dealt with the controversy surrounding Urban Beach Week.

In 2011, Bower announced her re-election campaign for a third, and final, term as Mayor of Miami Beach. (Mayors are term-limited to three, two-year terms in office). Bower, who was 72 years old in November 2011, faced three opponents in the election: comedian Steve Berke, entrepreneur Dave Crystal, and public relations practitioner Laura Rivero Levey.

Bower was easily re-elected to a third term on November 1, 2011. She won 59.4% of the popular vote, or 4,103 votes. Her closest opponent, comedian and Yale University graduate Steve Berke, garnered 23.38%, or 1,614.

Matti Herrera Bower was sworn into her third mayoral term on November 2, 2011. Bower ran for the Miami Beach Commission Group 3 seat in 2013, but lost to Joy Malakoff, garnering 2,641 votes (40.27%) to Malakoff's 4,214 votes (59.73%).

== See also ==
- Miami Beach mayoral election, 2011
- List of mayors of Miami Beach, Florida
