= List of mayors and city managers of Miami Beach, Florida =

Miami Beach, Florida operates under a council-manager system (weak mayor), with both an office of mayor and city manager.

== Office of Mayor ==
Mayor of the City of Miami Beach
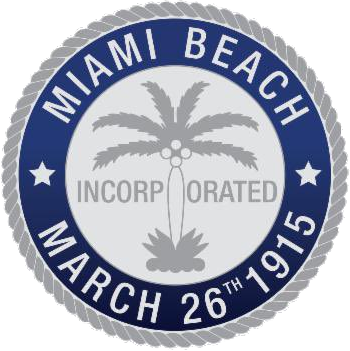
- Seal of the City of Miami Beach

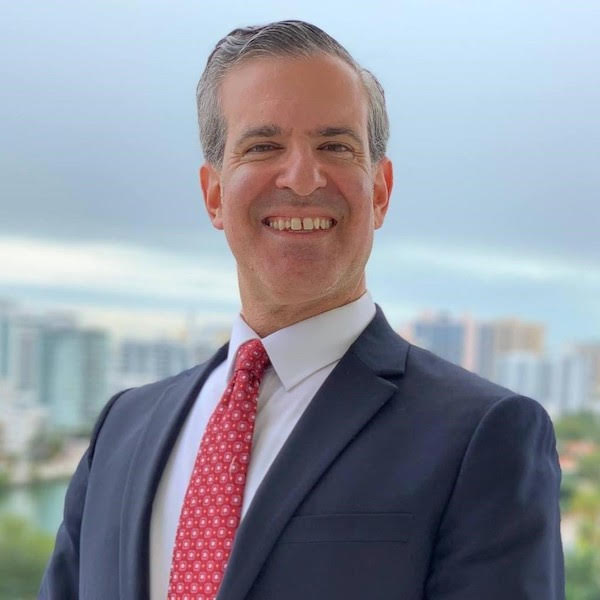
- Incumbent; Steven Meiner since November 28, 2023
- Term length: Two years
- Inaugural holder: John Newton Lummus, Sr.
- Formation: 1915
- Salary: $10,000 (as of 2025)
- Website: Mayor's official website

The mayor of Miami Beach is the nonpartisan chief executive of the municipal government of Miami Beach, Florida, and the presiding member of its seven-member City Commission. Modern-day mayors are elected to two-year terms and are term-limited to no more than 3 terms, which can be consecutive or non-consecutive. The mayor and other members of the City Commission appoint a city manager to administer the day-to-day affairs and operations of City Hall and its various departments. City Hall is located at 1700 Convention Center Drive; the mayor's office is located on the fourth floor.

Three father-son combinations have held the office: the John Lummuses (Jr. and Sr.), the Dermers (Jay and David), and the Gelbers (Seymour and Dan). One woman has served as mayor (Matti Bower). She is also, thus far, the only Hispanic person to serve.

Six mayors (D. Lee Powell, Alex Daoud, Seymour Gelber, David Dermer, Matti Bower, and Dan Gelber) served 3 terms while Louis Snedigar is the only one elected to 4.

Snedigar was the longest-serving mayor, with a non-consecutive total of eight years and 8 months in office. Acting mayor Stanley Arkin was the briefest, filling in for three months in 1991 following Daoud's removal from office.

As of November 2025, there are six living former mayors: Norman Ciment, Neisen Kasdin, David Dermer, Matti Bower, Philip Levine, and Dan Gelber.

The current mayor is Steven Meiner, who was elected on November 21, 2023, and assumed office on November 28, 2023. He was reelected to a second term on November 4, 2025.

As of 2025, the mayor is paid an annual salary of $10,000 and also receives taxable fringe benefits of $37,800.

== List of mayors (1915–present) ==
No.	Portrait	Name	Term in office	Terms	Approximate length of service	Notes
1		John Newton Lummus Sr. 1871–1961	March 26, 1915 – October 28, 1918	2	3 years, 7 months	Father of 5th mayor, J. N. Lummus, Jr.
2		Thomas Jessup Pancoast; 1865–1941	October 28, 1918 – October 25, 1920	1	2 years	
3		Thomas E. James; 1872–1936	October 25, 1920 – October 23, 1922	1	2 years	
4		Louis Fielding "Red" Snedigar; 1890–1951	October 23, 1922 – December 21, 1926	1st and 2nd of 4 terms	4 years, 2 months	Longest-serving mayor (8 years, 8 months over 4 terms)
5		John Newton Lummus Jr. 1899–1983	December 21, 1926 – December 18, 1928	1	2 years	Son of 1st mayor, J. N. Lummus, Sr.
6		Louis Fielding "Red" Snedigar; 1890–1951	December 18, 1928 – December 16, 1930	3rd of 4 terms	2 years	
7		Val C. Cleary; 1882–1966	December 16, 1930 – December 20, 1932	1st of 2 terms	2 years	
8		Arthur Frank Katzentine; 1902–1960	December 20, 1932 – December 18, 1934	1	2 years	
9		Louis Fielding "Red" Snedigar; 1890–1951	December 18, 1934 – June 1, 1937	4th of 4 terms	2 years, 6 1/2 months	
10		John Hale Levi; 1875–1948	June 1, 1937 – June 3, 1941	1st and 2nd of 3 terms	4 years	
11		Val C. Cleary; 1882–1966	June 3, 1941 – June 1, 1943	2nd of 2 terms	2 years	
12		Mitchell Wolfson; 1900–1983	June 1, 1943 – June 5, 1944	1	1 year	
13		John Hale Levi; 1875–1948	June 5, 1944 – June 5, 1945	3rd of 3 terms	1 year	
14		Herbert A. Frink; 1903–1962	June 5, 1945 – June 3, 1947	1	2 years	
15		Marcie Liberman; 1896–1966	June 3, 1947 – June 7, 1949	1	2 years	
16		Harold Turk; 1915?–1988	June 7, 1949 – June 5, 1951	1	2 years	
17		D. Lee Powell; 1908–1983	June 5, 1951 – June 2, 1953	1st of 3 terms	2 years	
18		Harold Shapiro; 1906?–1981	June 2, 1953 – June 7, 1955	1	2 years	Born in Russia, emigrated to U.S. at age 4
19		D. Lee Powell; 1908–1983	June 7, 1955 – June 4, 1957	2nd of 3 terms	2 years	
20		Kenneth Oka; 1916–1987	June 4, 1957 – June 2, 1959	1st of 2 terms	2 years	
21		D. Lee Powell; 1908–1983	June 2, 1959 – June 6, 1961	3rd of 3 terms	2 years	
22		Kenneth Oka; 1916–1987	June 6, 1961 – June 4, 1963	2nd of 2 terms	2 years	
23		Melvin J. Richard; 1911?–2001	June 4, 1963 – June 1, 1965	1	2 years	
24		Elliott Roosevelt; 1910–1990	June 1, 1965 – June 6, 1967	1	2 years	Son of Franklin D. Roosevelt
25		Jay Dermer; 1929–1984	June 6, 1967 – November 2, 1971	2	4 years, 5 months	Father of 35th mayor, David Dermer
26		Chuck Hall; 1918?–1974	November 2, 1971 – August 10, 1974 (died in office)	2	2 years, 9 months	Previously served as the first mayor of Miami-Dade County, 1964–1970
Acting		Harold Rosen; 1925–2018	August 10, 1974 – November 4, 1975		1 year, 3 months	Appointed to fill office upon Chuck Hall's death; later elected in his own right
27		Harold Rosen; 1925–2018	November 4, 1975 – November 1, 1977	1	2 years	Appointed to fill office upon Chuck Hall's death; later elected in his own right
28		Leonard Haber; 1933–2015	November 1, 1977 – November 6, 1979	1	2 years	
29		Murray Selbert Meyerson; 1931?–2017	November 6, 1979 – November 3, 1981	1	2 years	
30		Norman Ciment; 1936–	November 3, 1981 – November 1, 1983	1	2 years	
31		Malcolm Hubert Fromberg; 1935–2016	November 1, 1983 – November 5, 1985	1	2 years	
32		Alex Daoud; 1943–2025	November 5, 1985 – October 31, 1991 (suspended from office)	3	6 years	First mayor to serve 3 consecutive terms Suspended by Gov. Lawton Chiles following federal indictment
Acting		Stanley Arkin; 1932–2015	October 31, 1991 – November 20, 1991		3 weeks	Vice mayor at time of Alex Daoud's suspension
33		Seymour Gelber; 1919–2019	November 20, 1991 – November 4, 1997	3	6 years	Father of 38th mayor, Dan Gelber
34		Neisen Kasdin; 1954–	November 4, 1997 – November 13, 2001	2	4 years	
35		David Dermer; 1963–	November 13, 2001 – November 21, 2007	3	6 years	Son of 25th mayor, Jay Dermer
36		Matti Herrera Bower; 1939–	November 21, 2007 – November 25, 2013	3	6 years	First woman and Hispanic person to serve as mayor
37		Philip Levine; 1962–	November 25, 2013 – November 13, 2017	2	4 years	
38		Dan Gelber; 1960–	November 13, 2017 – November 28, 2023	3	6 years	Son of 33rd mayor, Seymour Gelber
39		Steven Meiner; 1971–	November 28, 2023 – Incumbent	2		

== Office of City Manager ==
In Miami Beach, city manager is responsible for administering governmental operations. An appointed city manager is responsible for administration of the city.

As of 2025, the city manager is paid an annual salary of $375,000.

== List of city managers ==
City managers of Miami Beach
#	Manager	Years served	Notes
1st	Claude A. Renshaw	1924–1958	
2nd	Morris N. Lipp	1958–1962	
3rd	O.M. Pushkin	1962–1966	
4th	J.C. Duffield	1966	
5th	Robert M. Oldland	1966–1967	
6th	J.C. Duffield	1967–1969	
7th	Clifford W. O'Key	1969–1972	
–	Frank R. Spence (acting manager)	1972–1976	
8th	D.A. Southern	1976–1979	
9th	Gavin W. O'Brien	1978–1979	
10th	Harold T. Totall	1979–1982	
11th	Rob W. Parkins	1982–1991	initially acting manager in 1982, before being permanently that same year
–	Carla B. Talarico (acting manager)	1991–1992	
12th	Roger M. Carlton	1992–1995	
13th	Jose Garcia-Pedrosa	1995–1998	
14th	Sergio Rodriguez	1998–1999	
–	Lawrence Levy (acting manager)	1999–2000	
15th	Jorge M. Gonzalez	2000–2012	
–	Kathie G. Brooks (interim manager)	2012–2013	
16th	Jimmy L. Morales	2013–2020	
–	Raul J. Aguila (interim manager)	2020–2021	
17th	Alina T. Hudak	2021–2024	
–	Rickelle Williams (interim manager)	2024	
18th	Eric T. Carpenter	2024–present	

== See also ==
- Miami Beach
- Miami Dade County
