= Yasmin Lukatz =

Israeli businessperson

- 'יסמין לוקץ
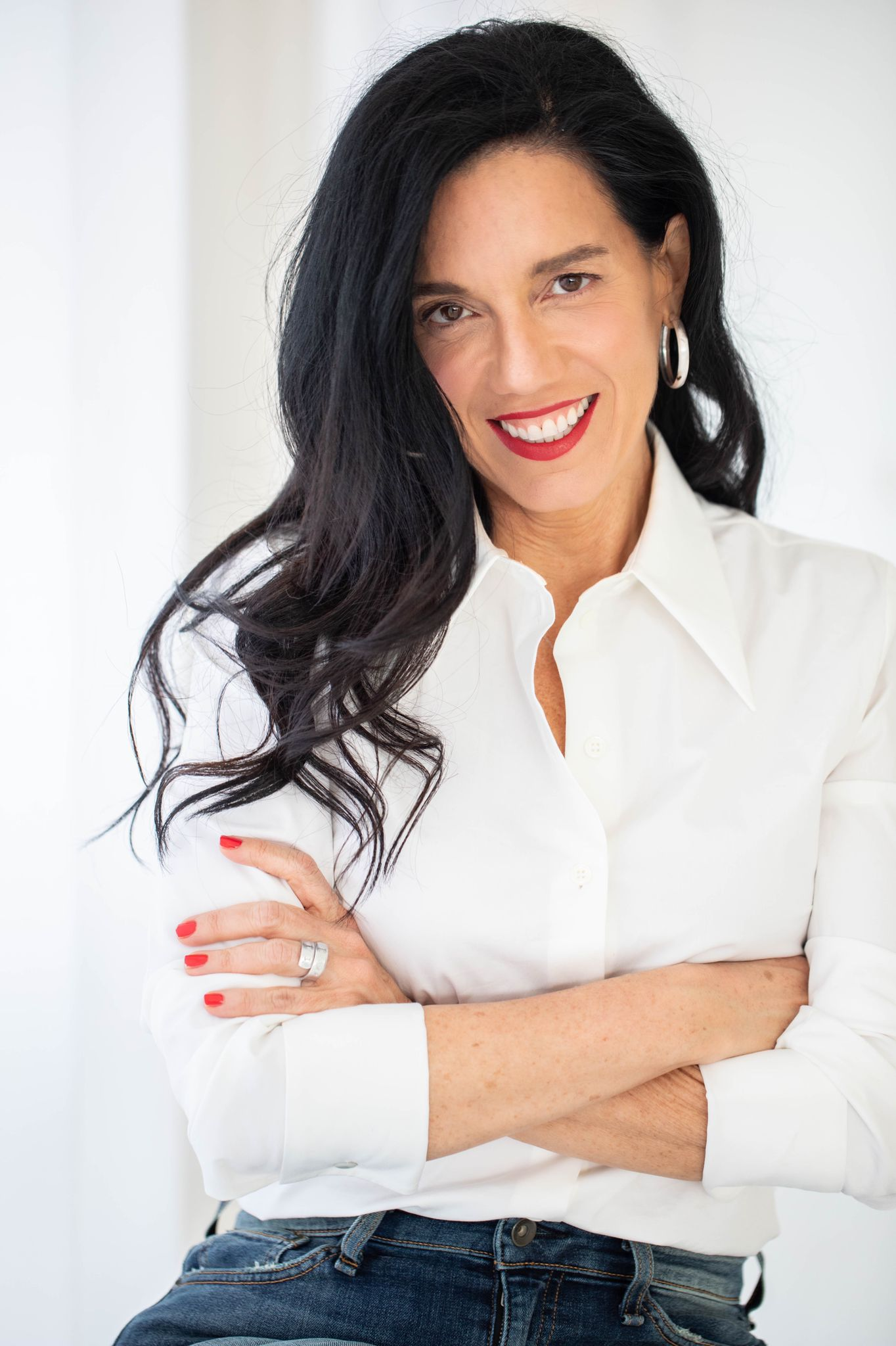
- Born: 5 May 1972 (age 54); Israel
- Education: Tel Aviv University; Stanford University
- Occupation: Businesswoman

Yasmin Lukatz (Hebrew: 'יסמין לוקץ; born May 1972) is an Israeli businesswoman.

Lukatz also lectures at Reichman University in Herzliya.

== Early life and education ==
Yasmin Lukatz was born in Israel in May 1972 to Miriam Adelson and Ariel Ochshorn. She is the stepdaughter of businessman Sheldon Adelson. She was raised in Tel Aviv, and in tenth grade moved with her mother to New York City.

After returning to Israel, Lukatz joined the IDF and served as an operations officer.

After completing her military service, Lukatz earned degrees in law (LL.B.), accounting and economics from Tel Aviv University. She later received her MBA from Stanford University and remained in Silicon Valley, where she began building her career in business and venture capital.

== Business career ==
Lukatz was certified as a lawyer in Israel, where she started her career working at Ernst & Young Israel.

She later moved to the U.S. to study at Stanford University, and after her graduation she was appointed by Sheldon Adelson as strategy advisor to Las Vegas Sands. In 2007, Lukatz joined as one of the founders of the newspaper Israel Hayom.

In 2010, Lukatz co-founded Evoz, a startup that developed a smart baby monitor that sends alerts to parents' smartphones.

Lukatz has since been an angel investor in Israeli and American startups, including Navan, Salt Security, Redkix, Aryon security and Tipalti.

In 2020, Ynet Global listed her among the 10 most influential Israelis in the United States.

Lukatz also founded 2 NGO's: ICON (Israel Collaboration Network) and Code for Israel.

== Television and media ==
Lukatz joined the investor panel of Shark Tank Israel (HaKrishim) in 2018 and became a regular panelist from the third season onward. Her investments on the show include Anabella, a company developing a new breast pump, alongside Oren Dobronsky.

In 2023, Lukatz competed on Dancing with the Stars.

In early 2025, Lukatz launched the podcast In Yasmin’s Living Room, whose guests have included Miriam Adelson, Yossi Cohen, Noa Tishby and Uriel Reichman.

== Personal life ==
Lukatz has four children. She returned to Israel in 2022 after nearly two decades in Silicon Valley.
