= Adelson Foundations =

American private charitable foundation

Adelson Foundation
- Founder: Sheldon and Miriam Adelson
- Purpose: Healthcare, Holocaust and anti-Semitism awareness, Israel advocacy and defense, Israel programs, Israel studies, Jewish and Zionist identity and education, media and culture, welfare
- Location: Los Angeles, California, United States
- Region served: United States and Israel
- Method: Donations and grants
- Endowment: $143 million as of 2012
- Website: adelsonfoundation.org

The Adelson Foundations refer to the American private charitable foundations founded by business magnate Sheldon and Miriam Adelson. The organizations are based in Los Angeles.

== Areas of support ==
The foundation is divided into two branches, including the Adelson Family Foundation, which was established in 2007, and the Adelson Medical Research Foundation. The former works to strengthen the State of Israel and the Jewish people, while the latter focuses on healthcare.

Noteworthy donations of the organization include: $50 million to the Dr. Miriam and Sheldon G. Adelson Educational Campus, another $67 million in total was donated to their Medical Research Foundation, and $33 million to the Birthright Israel Foundation, and $13 million toward paying for the promotional trips to Israel, Jerusalem and the Golan Heights that the nonprofit organizes for young Jewish people.

In addition, the couple have pledged $3 million to Hebrew SeniorLife for housing facilities and a program to bring together older people and elementary-school students for education programs; $2 million to Gateways: Access to Jewish Education for programs for children with special needs; and $1 million to the Chelsea Jewish Foundation for specialized housing for patients with amyotrophic lateral sclerosis and multiple sclerosis. Those pledges will be paid over five years, and since 2007, the Adelson Family Foundation has made contributions totalling $140 million to Birthright Israel, which finances Jewish youth trips to Israel.

The Adelson Foundation gives $200 million annually to Jewish and Israeli causes, the largest by far of any existing private foundation with that aim.

As of 2014, the foundation had donated $200 million to Birthright Israel and $50 million to Yad Vashem, and had begun supporting the Israeli American Council.

The foundation funds the Maccabee Task Force, which works to oppose the Boycott, Divestment and Sanctions movement on university campuses and improve the public image of Israel.

In 2025, the foundation was one of the donors who funded the White House's East Wing demolition, and planned building of a ballroom.

In August 2026, it was announced that Shoham Nicolet would be appointed as president of the Adelson Family Foundation.
