= Hashomer Hachadash =

Israeli nonprofit

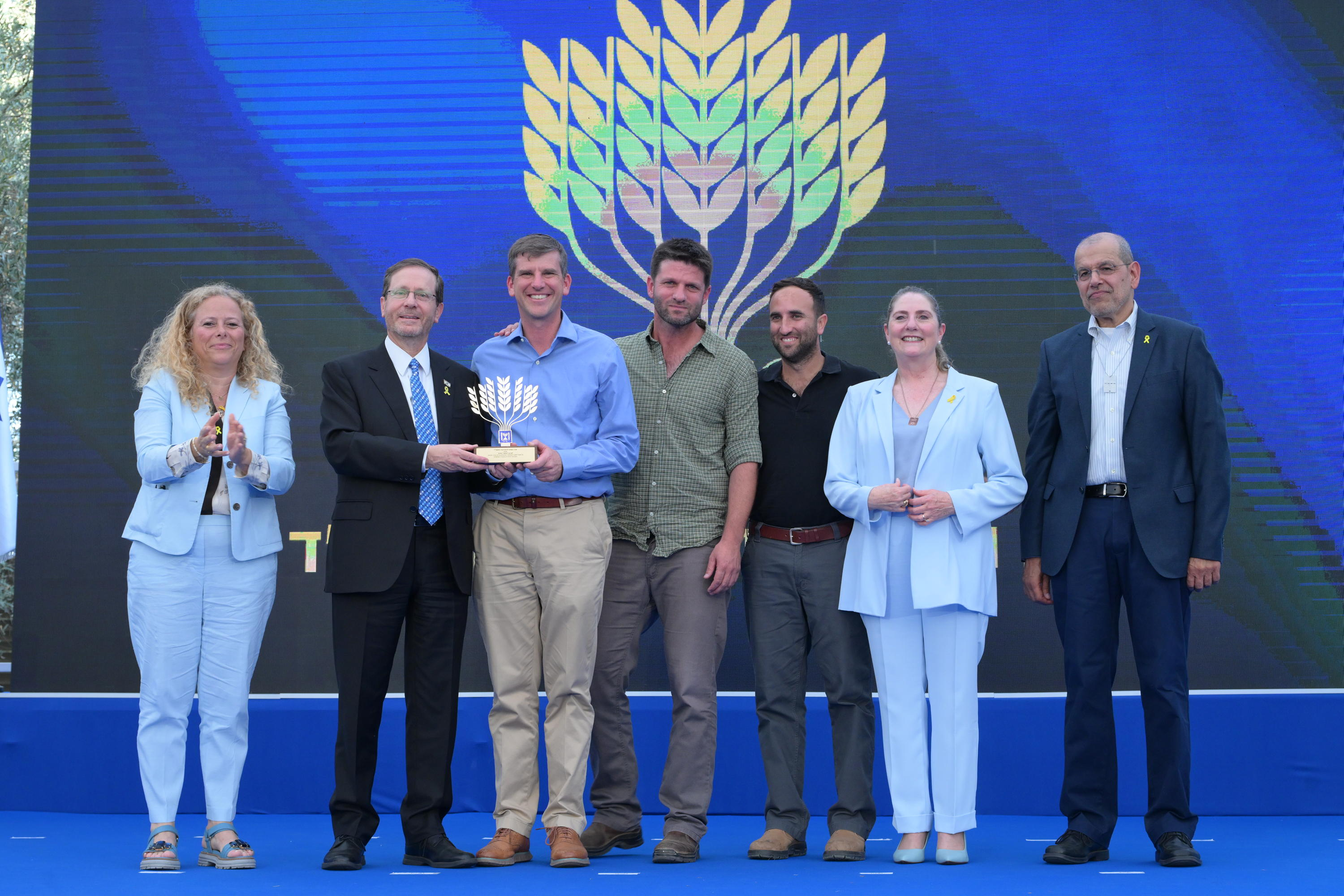
HaShomer HaChadash founder Yoel Zilberman (third from right) receiving a presidential award in 2024.

HaShomer HaChadash (Hebrew: השומר החדש, "The New Guardian") is an Israeli nonprofit that recruits volunteers to work on farms as security guards and agricultural laborers, inspired by the early twentieth century Hashomer movement. The organization describes itself as "a Zionist volunteer-based organization that aims to protect the land of Israel and connect the Israeli society and the Jewish people to its heritage." It was founded in 2007 by Yoel Zilberman.

It has an annual budget of over $33 million, making it one of Israel's largest NGOs. Many prominent figures in Israel have served on its board, and it maintains close relationships with government ministries and the Jewish National Fund. HaShomer HaChadash is often associated with the right wing of Israeli politics, though Zilberman describes it as apolitical.

In December 2025, Der Spiegel described HaShomer HaChadash as an organization that supports Israeli settlers in the West Bank.

HaShomer HaChadash also operates six agricultural boarding schools and a youth movement with 22,000 members, among other programs.

HaShomer HaChadash is active both in Israel proper and in the Israeli-occupied West Bank. People wearing HaShomer HaChadash clothing have been documented participating in settler violence in the West Bank.

In July 2026, it was reported that Yoel Zilberman had established a private cattle ranch on illegally occupied Syrian territory beyond the previously occupied areas of the Golan Heights.

== Funding ==
HaShomer HaChadash has received funding from the Ministry of Religious Services and the Settlement and National Missions Ministry, as well as American donors, including Irving and Cherna Moskowitz, Sheldon and Miriam Adelson, and DonorsTrust. After the October 7 attacks in 2023, the organization received an influx of new funding from the Jewish diaspora, including a $300,000 donation from the Jewish Federations of North America.
