= Shalosh (band) =

Israeli electronic/jazz band

- Origin: Tel Aviv, Israel
- Genres: Jazz; Electronic
- Years active: 2013–present
- Labels: Contemplate Music, Jazz Family, ACT music
- Members: Gadi Stern; Matan Assayag; David Michaeli
- Past members: Daniel Benhorin
- Website: shalosh.net

Shalosh is an Israel based band originally established by pianist Gadi Stern with drummer Matan Assayag and bass player Daniel Benhorin in 2013 in Tel Aviv. David Michaeli replaced Daniel Benhorin as the double bass player. The band is mostly well known for its crossing genre style, mostly between Jazz Rock and electronic music. Shalosh have played well over 250 shows since 2013, all around the globe. The name Shalosh refers to the Hebrew word for Three.

In 2014, Shalosh released their first album The Bell Garden. Israel Hayom named The Bell Garden album of the year.

Shalosh released their second album Rules of Oppression in 2016.

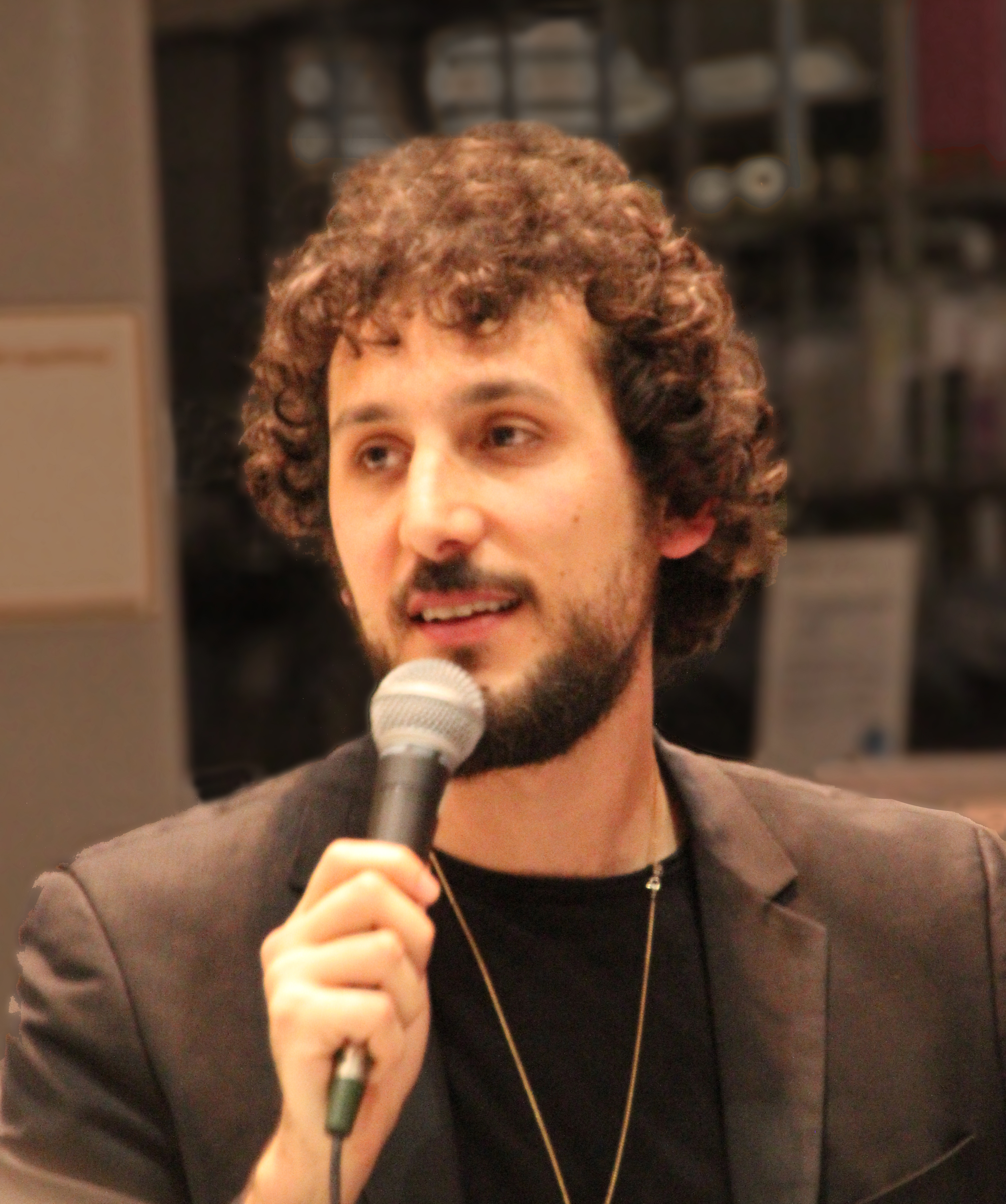
Gadi Stern

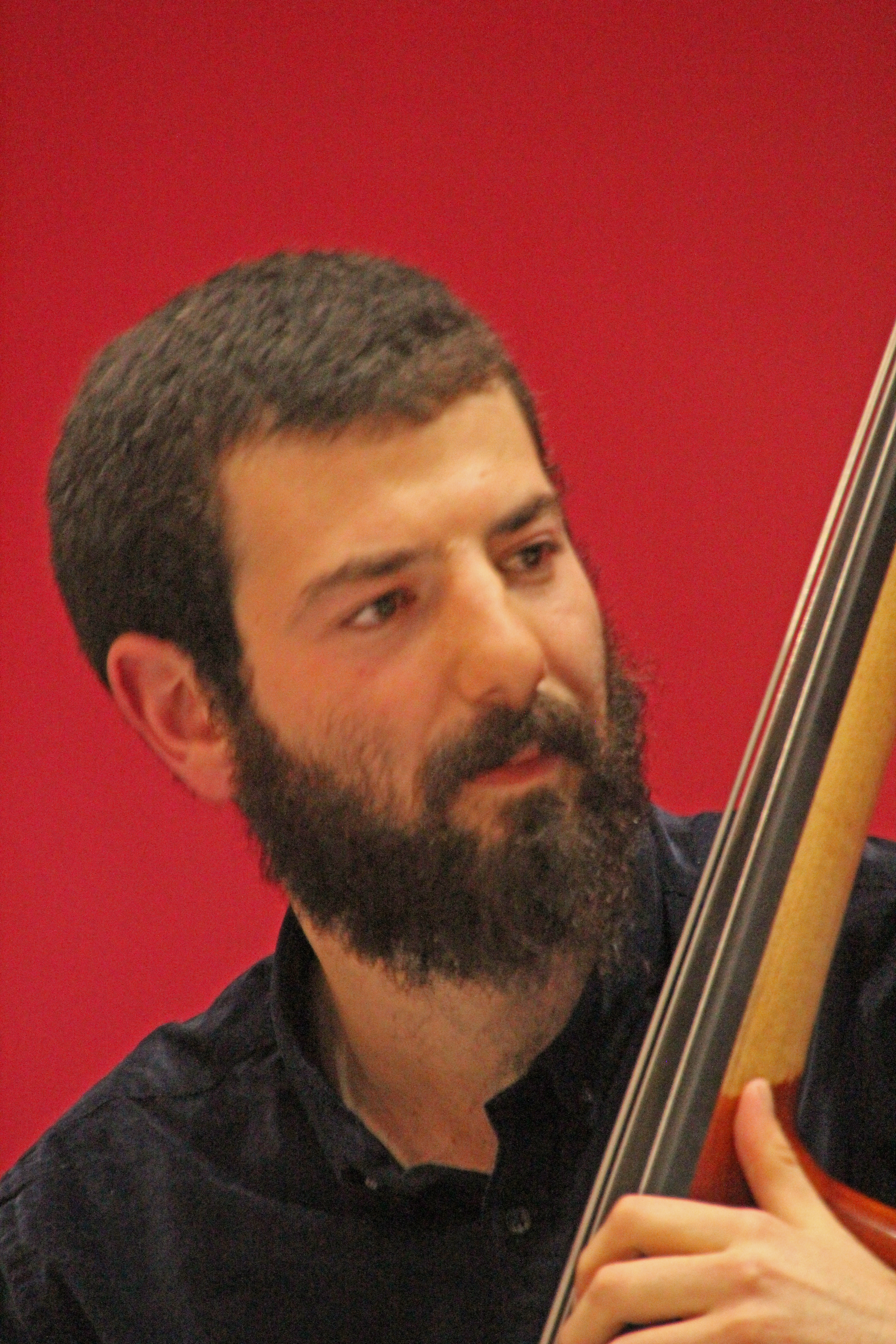
David Michaeli

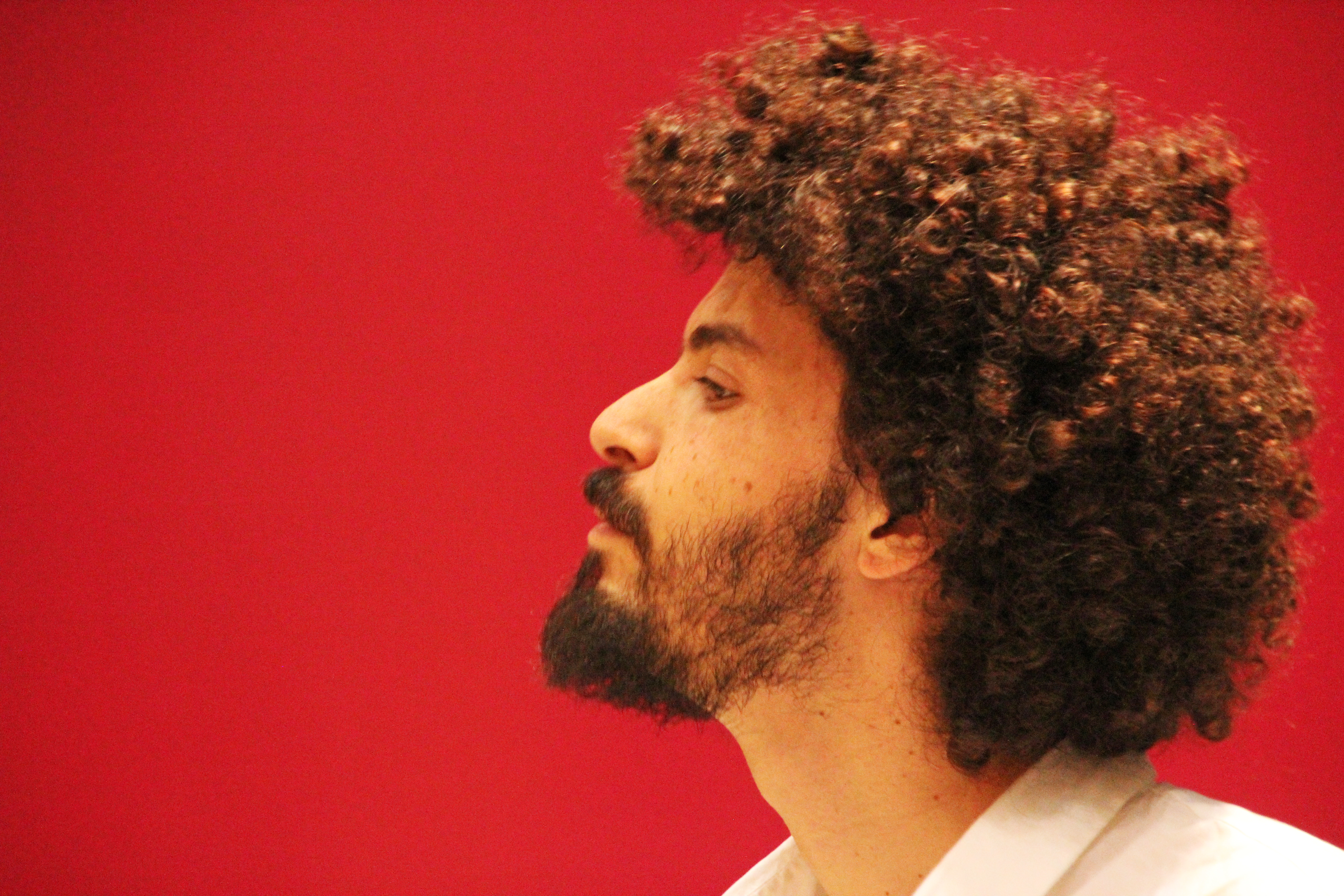
Matan Assayag

== Discography ==
- The Bell Garden (March 2014)
- Rules of Oppression (2016)
- Onwards and Upwards (May 2019)
- Broken Balance (2020)
- Tales of Utopia (2023)
