= Chemi Shalev =

Israeli journalist

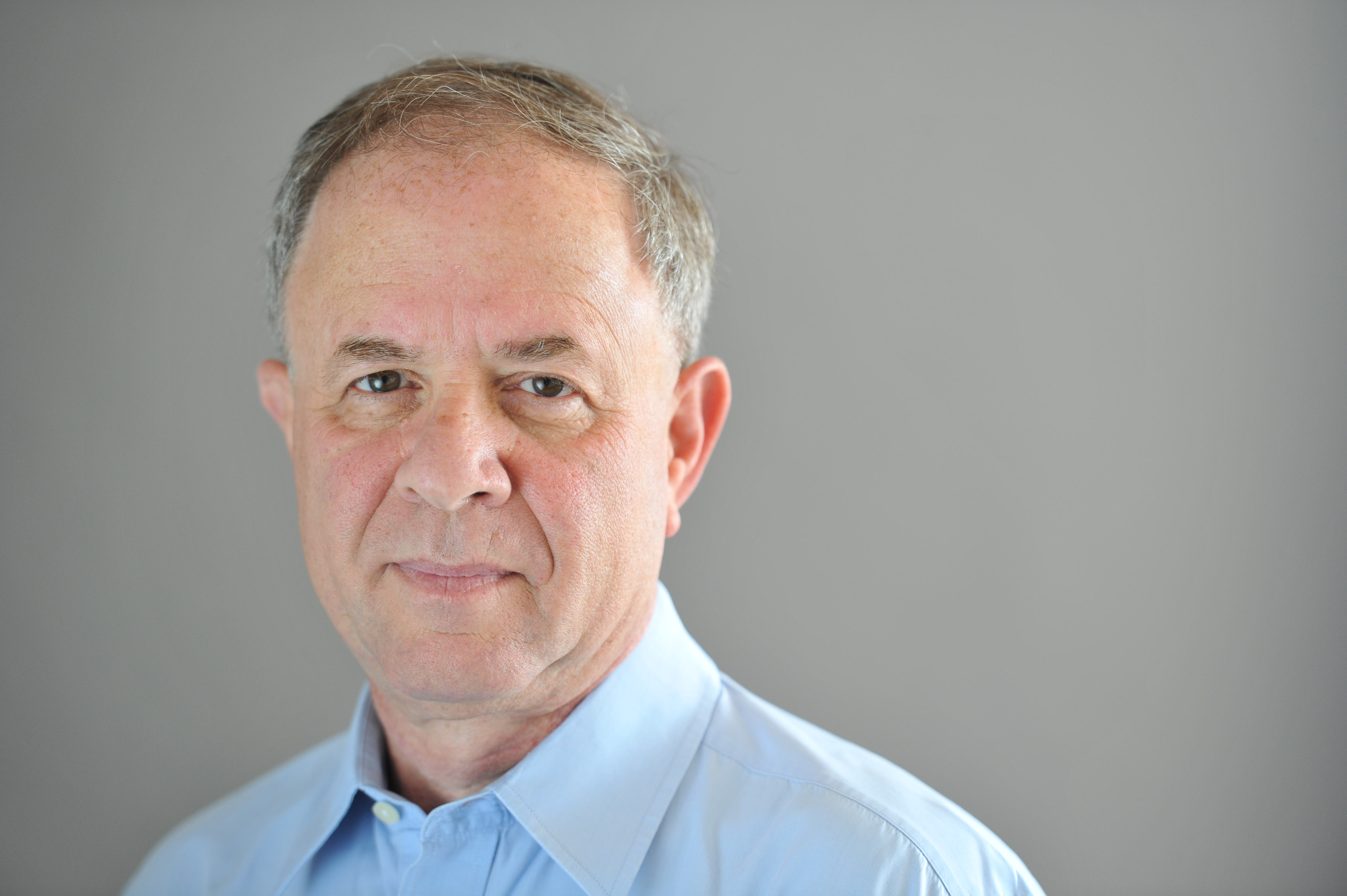
Chemi Shalev

Chemi Shalev (Hebrew: מנחם "חמי" שלו; born 14 April 1953) is an Israeli journalist.

== Biography ==
Menachem (Chemi) Shalev was born in Washington, D.C. Shalev is married with three daughters and lives in Givatayim.

== Journalism career ==
Shalev began his journalism career at the Jerusalem Post under David Landau. He was the US correspondent for Haaretz newspaper in 2011–2016. He publishes an English-language blog called "West of Eden" dealing with Israel–United States relations and the American Jewish community. Previously, Shalev was deputy editor and diplomatic commentator for Israel Hayom newspaper. He served as diplomatic correspondent for The Jerusalem Post, Davar and Ma'ariv.

Shalev was the Jerusalem correspondent for the New York-based Jewish weekly, The Forward. In 2007, he returned from a four-year stay in Australia, where he was associate editor of The Australian Jewish News.

== See also ==
- Journalism in Israel
