= Adelson Educational Campus =

The Adelson School - Las Vegas

Location
- 9700 Hillpointe Road; Las Vegas, Nevada 89134; United States
- Coordinates: 36.200807°N 115.306012°W

Information
- Type: Private school
- Head of School: Rabbi Mark Gottlieb
- Faculty: 65
- Grades: Pre K – 12
- Enrollment: 600 (2013-2014)
- Color
- Athletics conference: Nevada Interscholastic Activities Association – 2A
- Website: Official Website

In 1980, the Hebrew Academy Las Vegas opened at the original Temple Beth Sholom in East Las Vegas. Eight years later, its director, Dr. Tamar Lubin Saposhnik along with Las Vegas businessman Milton I. Schwartz along with George and Gertrude Rudiak, created the Milton I. Schwartz Hebrew Academy for elementary-aged children.

Dr. Miriam and Sheldon G. Adelson made a major gift in November 2006, for The Adelson School in Summerlin, which grew from 145 students to 600 students today.

The Adelson School consists of three schools:

• The Lower School provides students from 18 months through 4th grade.

• The Middle School, grades 5–8.

• The Upper School, grades 9–12.
