= Israeli (newspaper) =

Hebrew-language Israeli newspaper (2006–2008)

- Type: Daily newspaper
- Format: Newspaper
- Owner(s): Sheldon Adelson
- Founded: January 2006
- Language: Hebrew, English
- Ceased publication: 2008

Israeli (Hebrew: ישראלי, jisra'eli) was an Israeli daily Hebrew-language newspaper distributed for free in railway stations, bus terminals, and Delek gas stations. Based on the concept of the Metro free daily newspapers, it was geared toward a young, urban, and mobile clientele.

The newspaper, first published in January 2006, was co-owned by Sheldon Adelson and Hirsch Media (owned by Shlomo Ben Tzvi) and published by Israeli News Ltd. Its headquarters were located on Menahem Begin Road in Tel Aviv. Its original budget was planned to be US$35 million over three to four years.

It was long suspected that the paper was losing money, but as the number of pages increased from the originally-planned sixteen to twenty-four, and often even more (up to 40), the publishers insisted that the newspaper's expanding size was a sign of strong demand from advertisers. Israeli aimed to become the second-largest paper in Israel, behind Yediot Aharonot, and claimed to print 200,000 issues each day in two daily editions, morning and evening. Criticism of this claim led the publishers to consider numbering each copy under supervision of an accounting firm.

In September 2006, it was reported in the Hebrew media that the newspaper would be offering a web portal based on news and blogs which would have some crossover to the print edition.

In 2007, Adelson withdrew from the partnership because of differences of opinion and instead pursued competing options, making an unsuccessful bid to buy controlling interest in the Israeli newspaper Maariv. When this failed, he proceeded with parallel plans to publish a free daily newspaper. On 30 July 2007, a free newspaper Israel Hayom, owned by the family of Adelson, was launched.

In January 2008, the newspaper Israeli was disbanded.
