= Miriam Adelson =

Israeli-American physician, billionaire, and conservative donor (born 1945)

- מרים אדלסון
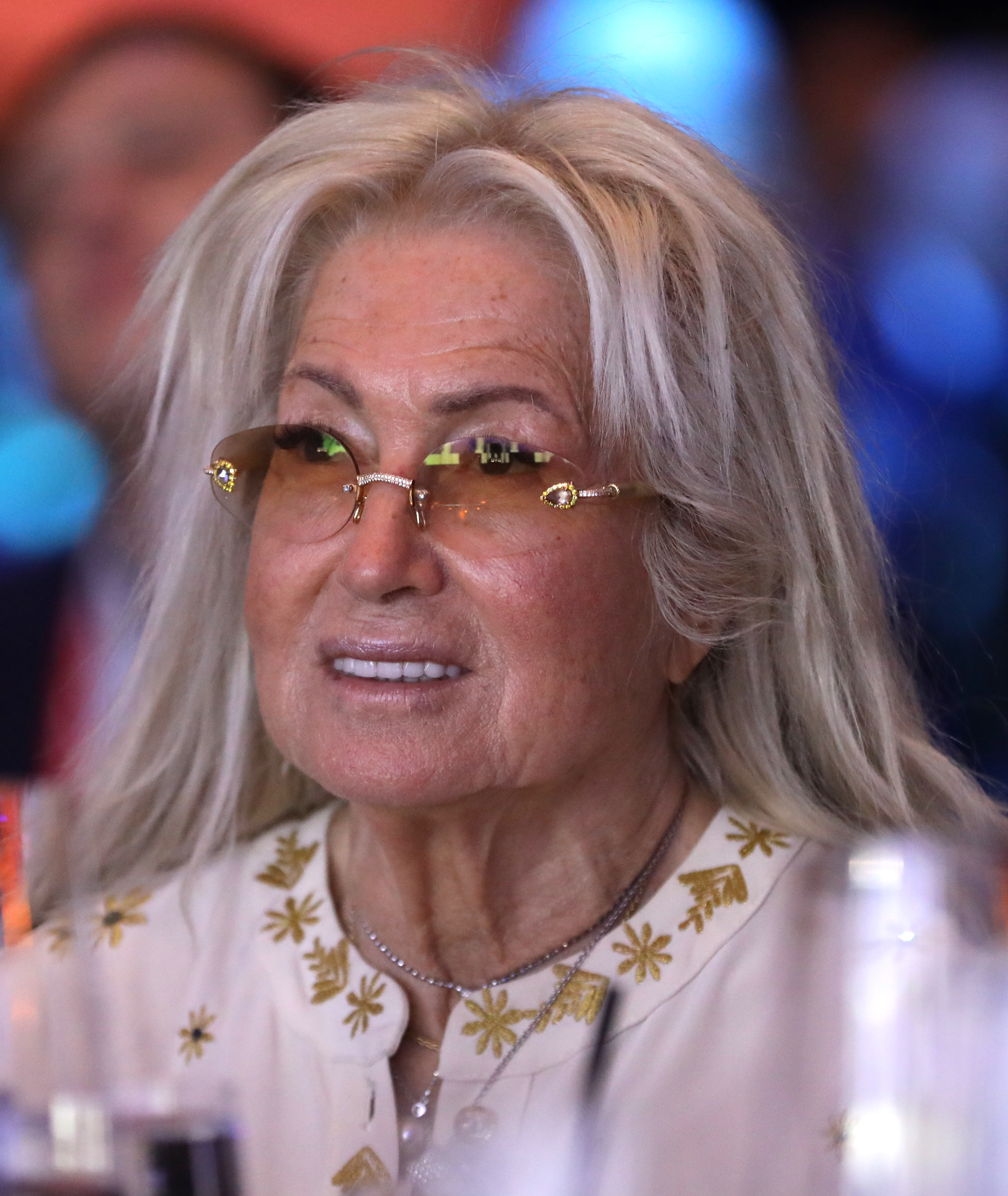
- Adelson in 2023
- Born: Miriam Farbstein; 10 October 1945 (age 81); Tel Aviv, Mandatory Palestine
- Education: Hebrew University of Jerusalem (BS); Tel Aviv University (MD)
- Political party: Republican
- Spouses: Ariel Ochshorn (div. 1986); Sheldon Adelson (m. 1991; died 2021)
- Children: 4, including Matan Adelson and Yasmin Lukatz
- Awards: Presidential Medal of Freedom (2018); Honorary doctorate from Tel Aviv University (2007)

Miriam Adelson (née Farbstein; born October 10, 1945) is an Israeli-American physician, businesswoman, philanthropist, and conservative political donor. She was married to Sheldon Adelson until his death in 2021.

As of October 2025, estimates placed her wealth at $34.6 billion, making her the 48th richest person in the world. Notable holdings include the Las Vegas Sands and the Dallas Mavericks. She is the current publisher of Israel Hayom and, with her family, owns the Las Vegas Review-Journal.

Since the 2010s, Adelson has been one of the Republican Party's largest individual donors, and since 2016 she has been one of the most prominent financial supporters of Donald Trump. She and her husband provided the largest donation to his 2016 campaign, his presidential inauguration, his defense fund against the Mueller investigation into Russian interference, and the 2020 campaign. She was the third largest donor to Trump's 2024 election bid, donating $106 million.

Adelson has consistently advocated for the US government to adopt pro-Israel policies, including supporting Israel's annexation of the West Bank.

President Trump awarded her the Presidential Medal of Freedom in 2018.

== Biography ==
Adelson was born Miriam Farbstein in Tel Aviv, then in Mandatory Palestine (present-day Israel), in 1945 to parents who fled Poland before the Holocaust. Her father was a prominent member of Mapam, a left-wing political party in Israel. In the 1950s, her family settled in Haifa, where Adelson's father owned and operated several movie theaters. She attended the Hebrew Reali School for 12 years.

Prior to her marriage to Sheldon, Miriam was married to Ariel Ochshorn, also a physician, and had daughters Sivan Ochshorn and Yasmin Lukatz. The couple were divorced by 1986.

=== Medical career ===
After earning a Bachelor of Science in microbiology and genetics from the Hebrew University of Jerusalem, she earned a medical degree, graduating magna cum laude from Tel Aviv University Faculty of Medicine.

She served mandatory army service as a medical officer at Ness Ziona. She eventually became the chief internist in an emergency room at Tel Aviv's Rokach (Hadassah) Hospital. She went to Rockefeller University in 1986 as an associate physician specializing in drug addiction. There, she was mentored by, and subsequently collaborated for two decades with, Mary Jeanne Kreek, who was known for the development of methadone therapy for heroin addiction. She has published numerous scientific papers on the topic of drug addiction during her career and has been a guest investigator at Rockefeller University.

=== Marriage to Sheldon Adelson and later career ===
She met businessman Sheldon Adelson on a blind date in 1989; they married in 1991. Together, they had two sons, Adam Adelson and Matan Adelson.

In 1993, the couple opened the first branch of the Adelson Clinic, a substance abuse clinic, in Israel. They opened a second location in Las Vegas in 2000. The clinics specialize in the use of medically assisted detox techniques, such as methodone.

In 2018, Adelson was named the publisher of Israel Hayom, the most widely read newspaper in Israel, a position she still holds. That year, she was awarded the Presidential Medal of Freedom by Donald Trump.

After Sheldon Adelson died in 2021, she became the owner of casino company Las Vegas Sands, which he had founded. She remains the majority owner of Las Vegas Sands, which she runs along with her family.

== Philanthropy ==
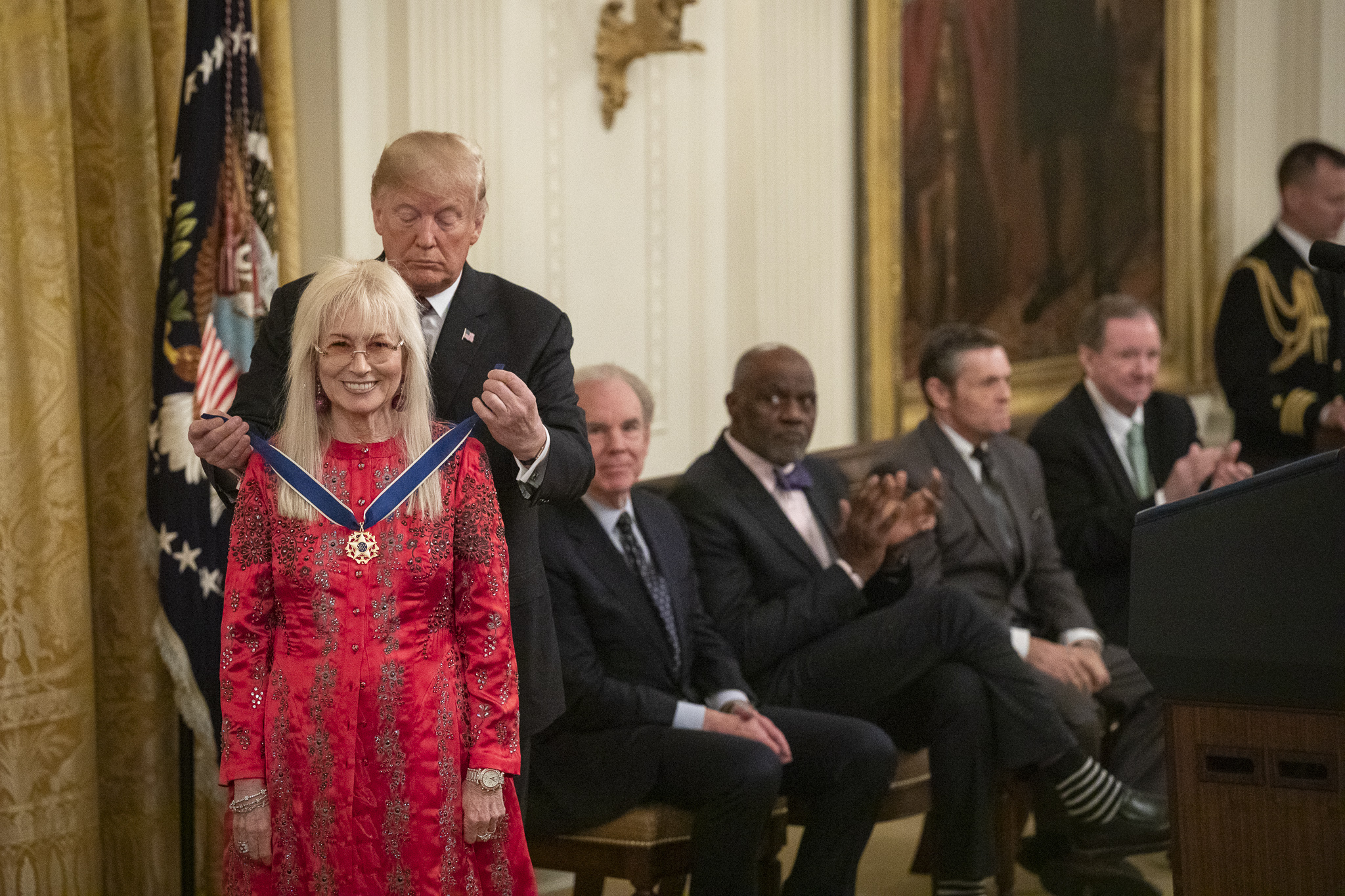
Donald Trump presents the Medal of Freedom to Adelson

Adelson operates the Adelson Foundations. The foundation is divided into two branches: the Adelson Family Foundation, which was established in 2007, and the Adelson Medical Research Foundation. The former works to strengthen the State of Israel and the Jewish people, while the latter focuses on healthcare.

The Adelson Foundation gives $200 million annually to Jewish and Israeli causes, the largest by far of any existing private foundation with that aim.

She is a voting member on the board of trustees at the University of Southern California, and was a financial backer of Ariel University's medical school which opened in the West Bank in 2019.

== Political activities in the United States ==
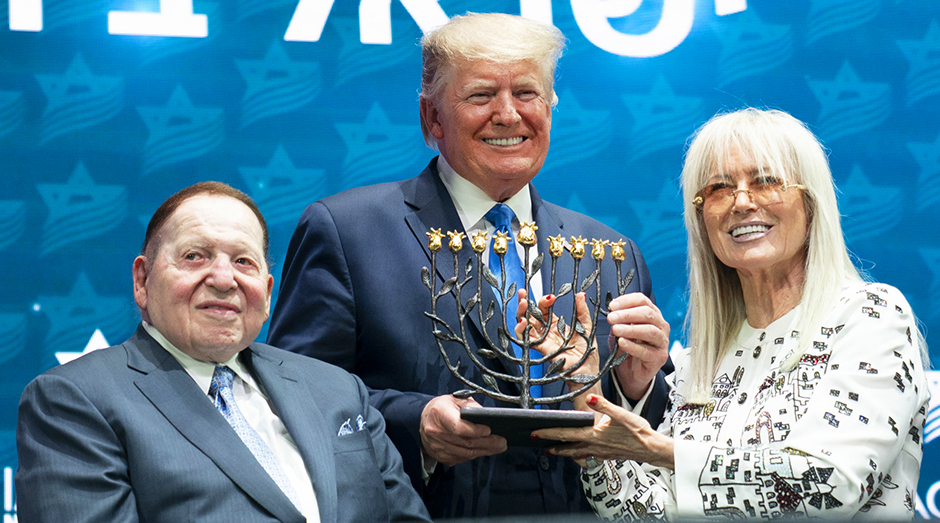
With her husband and Donald Trump in 2019

In May 2024, New York magazine stated that the press often misreported Miriam's political donations as having been made by Sheldon. The magazine tabulated that during their marriage, Sheldon made 848 campaign donations and Miriam made 717. Sheldon had a lifetime total donation figure of $273 million, while as of the publishing of their profile, Miriam had a total of $284 million.

Miriam Adelson has been described by major news outlets, including Reuters and Bloomberg, as a significant financial supporter of pro-Israel political causes in the United States, contributing substantial funding to Republican-aligned political initiatives and organizations supporting U.S.–Israel relations. She has also contributed tens of millions of dollars to Republican-aligned Super PACs in recent election cycles aimed at maintaining the party's influence in Congress, according to reporting by Bloomberg and federal campaign finance disclosures. Miriam Adelson made her first substantive political donations shortly after her marriage to Sheldon, in 1991. She soon switched her support from Democratic candidates to Republicans. The Adelsons were notably early donors to Benjamin Netanyahu in his 1996 campaign for Prime Minister of Israel and also gave some money to the second inauguration of George W. Bush in 2005.

Following the 2010 ruling in Citizens United v. FEC, Adelson dramatically increased the size of her political donations. She was the top female donor in the 2012 United States elections, contributing as much as the next 15 female donors combined, a total of $46 million.

During the Gaza war, she published an op-ed in Forbes Israel and Israel Hayom, where she stated that "radical Muslim and Black Lives Matter activists, ultra-progressives and career agitators...should be dead to us".

=== Support for Donald Trump ===
Since 2016, Adelson has been known for her support for Donald Trump. She and her husband were the largest donors to Trump throughout his first presidency; they provided the largest donation to his 2016 campaign, his presidential inauguration, his defense fund against the Mueller investigation into Russian interference and the 2020 campaign.

She has written that Trump "should enjoy sweeping support" among U.S. Jews and Israelis, and that Trump deserves a "Book of Trump" in the Bible due to his support for Israel. Adelson wrote that Trump represents "kinship, friendship, courage, the triumph of truth" and that "Israelis and proud Jews owe Donald Trump our gratitude."

In January 2019 the Adelsons contributed $500,000 to the Patriot Legal Expense Fund Trust, which was set up in 2018 to assist aides of President Trump under investigation by special counsel Robert Mueller's probe into Russian interference in the 2016 United States elections. The contributions were the Trust's largest to date.

She served as one of the finance vice-chairs for Trump's first inauguration.

During the 2024 presidential primary, she initially declined to take a side early in the presidential primary as she was courted by Ron DeSantis and Nikki Haley. She ultimately supported Trump in the 2024 United States presidential election, contributing $106 million to Trump's re-election campaign, making her its third largest donor.

During the 2024 campaign, Adelson sought support from Trump for Israel's annexation of the West Bank. A spokesperson for Adelson denied allegations that her donations were made in exchange for support for this policy.

Michael Wolff's 2025 book All or Nothing discussed the relationship between Trump and Adelson. In the book, it is claimed that Trump had two dinners with Adelson prior to receiving an initial donation in the 2024 election cycle, after which he described her as "boring" and long-winded and shared a hesitancy to take further meetings as he did not believe she was going to donate. The White House communications director denied the claims.

Subsequently, the relationship faltered after the Republican National Convention when Trump learned Adelson had hired staff known to be critical of him to operate her super PAC devised to benefit him. Reportedly further irritated by Isaac Perlmutter telling him Adelson was unreliable, Trump dictated a text message to Adelson claiming that she was his "enemy" for hiring unsupportive staffers.

As of August 2026, Adelson spent $67.6 million in support of Republican candidates in the 2026 United States elections, donating $30 million to the Senate Leadership Fund, $25 million to MAGA Inc., and $10 million to the Congressional Leadership Fund.

== Israeli politics ==
Adelson has said that her heart is in Israel and that she got "stuck" in America after meeting her husband. She is credited with influencing Sheldon Adelson's political views on Israel and inspiring him to donate large sums of money to Zionist causes. Adelson is a financial supporter of the Zionist Organization of America, the Yad Vashem Holocaust museum and memorial in Jerusalem, and various U.S. groups that fundraise for the Israeli military.

Adelson backed Trump's January 2021 pardon of Aviem Sella, an Israeli spy who had fled the US in 1987 after being indicted on counts of espionage against the US government.

Adelson has been an influential voice in calling for deals with Hamas that facilitate the release of Israeli hostages taken during the October 7 attacks.

Adelson and her husband cut off contact with Benjamin Netanyahu and his wife, Sara, around 2019. Adelson has interpersonal strife with Sara, whom she believes has undue influence over the political decisions of Benjamin and regards as being psychologically ill. Adelson testified at Benjamin Netanyahu's 2024 corruption trial that Sara Netanyahu exerted pressure on her to provide her with gifts and favorable media coverage.

=== Involvement in Birthright Israel ===
Adelson is a prominent supporter of Birthright Israel, a program that brings young Jews to Israel for free. With her husband she was the program's largest donor; the couple had given more than $250 million to Birthright Israel by 2015.

=== Support for the annexation of the West Bank ===
Adelson donated $25 million towards Ariel University's medical school which opened in the West Bank in 2019. She stated that the gift would help "to strengthen the settlers in Judea and Samaria."

She donated $6 million to HaShomer HaChadash, a volunteer militia that puts volunteer security guards and agricultural workers on settler farms in the West Bank via the Adelson Foundations between 2019 and 2022.

In 2020, Adelson was named as a defendant alongside Netanyahu, Trump, AIPAC, and others in a lawsuit filed in the Washington, D.C., district court alleging "the denationalization and dehumanization of the Palestinian people" and "the installation of an apartheid regime in the OPT". Her husband was not included in the lawsuit. The case was dismissed in 2021.

=== President of the Maccabee Task Force ===
Adelson and her husband were early donors to the Maccabee Task Force (MTF), an organization aimed at combatting the Boycott, Divestment and Sanctions movement on college campuses and spreading pro-Israel sentiment among young people. In 2015, they donated $2.28 million to the MTF, and their support from 2016 to 2023 totaled more than $70 million. Adelson is the organization's president, but this is not listed on the organization's website. The Quincy Institute for Responsible Statecraft hypothesized a connection between the organization and the crackdown on participants in pro-Palestinian demonstrations on college campuses in Trump's second term.

== Ownership of Dallas Mavericks ==
Adelson and her son-in-law Patrick Dumont purchased a controlling ownership interest in the Dallas Mavericks of the National Basketball Association in December 2023. Dumont became the Mavericks' governor and representative to the NBA Board of Governors. The Adelson-Dumont families' would own 69% of the team and previous controlling owner Mark Cuban's share was reduced to 27%. Since this purchase, Adelson has been advocating and lobbying for legalization of casino gambling in Texas, in order to build a casino in the state. It was reported that the NBA would not allow Adelson to be the governor for the team due to her political reputation, but allowed Dumont to be governor instead. In January 2026, the team confirmed that it was interested in property in downtown Dallas that is the current site of the Dallas City Hall in order to build an entertainment complex that would include an arena and potentially a casino; however, the team would ultimately settle on the site of the demolished Valley View Mall in north Dallas as the site of the team's new arena.

Under Adelson's management, Luka Dončić was controversially traded to the Los Angeles Lakers with the explanation that he was not taking care of his body well enough. After the trade, a fan was removed from a Mavericks' game for wearing t-shirts that showed a red clown nose on a picture of Adelson. At the same game, people chanting for the firing of the general manager who set up the trade were also removed. The trade led to conspiracy theories that Adelson was purposely harming the team to facilitate moving them to her home city, Las Vegas.

== Estimations of net worth ==
Since the death of her husband, Miriam Adelson has been ranked as one of the wealthiest people in the world. Forbes estimated her net worth at $38.2 billion in 2021, $27.5 billion in 2022, and $35 billion in 2023. In 2024, Adelson's net worth was estimated at $32 billion, making her the richest Israeli and the 53rd-richest person in the world as well as the richest person in the state of Nevada. Forbes has also listed Adelson among the ten richest women in America in 2023 and 2024, ranking her fifth and eighth, respectively. According to the Bloomberg Billionaires Index, as of August 2025, Adelson had a net worth of $40.5 billion.

== Awards and recognition ==
- Presidential Medal of Freedom, awarded by President Donald Trump (2018)
- Doctor Honoris Causa by Tel Aviv University (2007)
- In 2013, Adelson received honorary citizenship of Jerusalem.
- Woodrow Wilson International Center for Scholars' Woodrow Wilson Award for Corporate Citizenship
