= Sheldon Adelson =

American businessman (1933–2021)

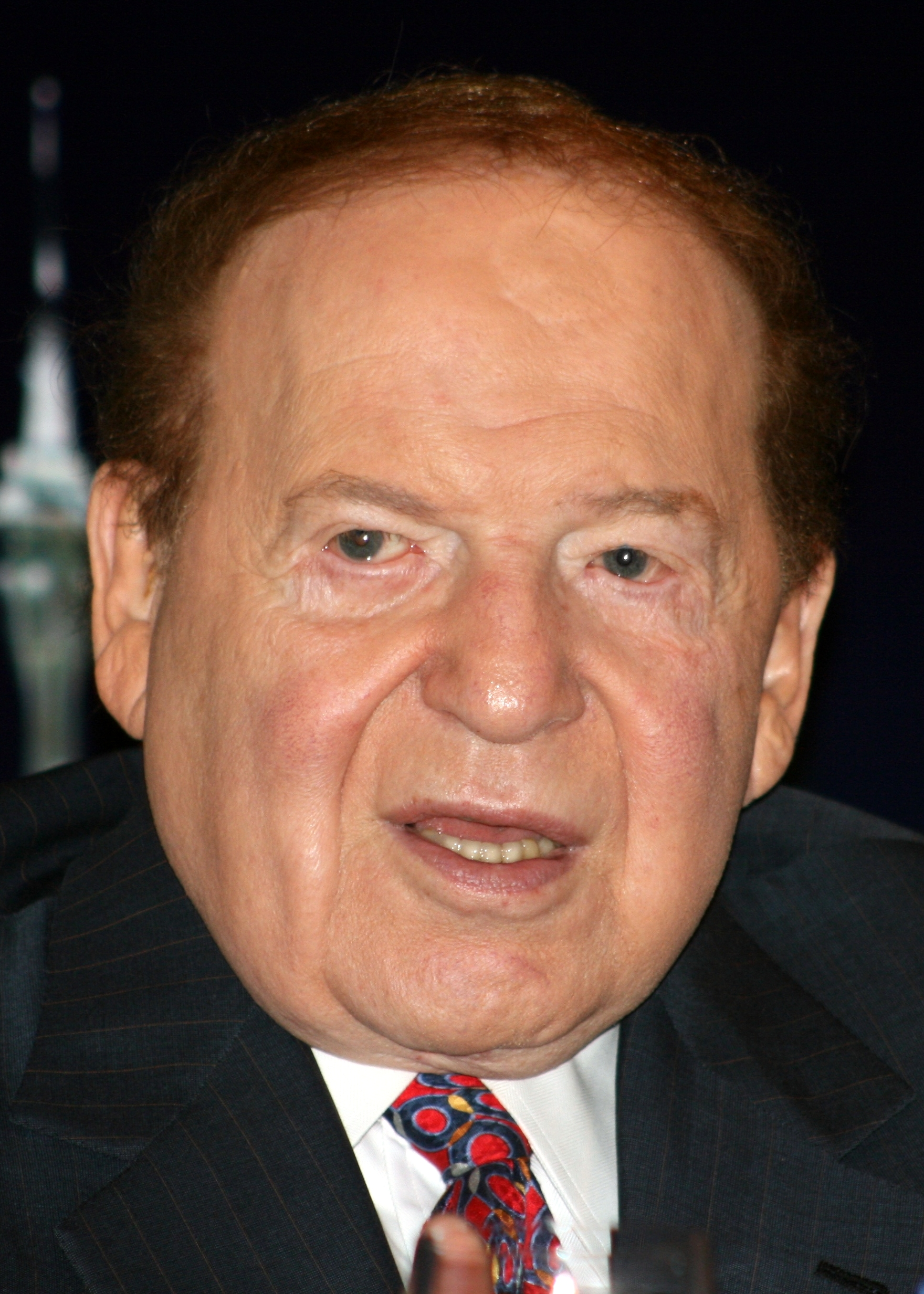
- Adelson after receiving the Woodrow Wilson Award in 2010
- Born: Sheldon Gary Adelson; August 5, 1933; Boston, Massachusetts, U.S.
- Died: January 11, 2021 (aged 87); Malibu, California, U.S.
- Resting place: Mount of Olives, Jerusalem
- Education: City College of New York
- Occupations: Founder, Chairman and CEO of Las Vegas Sands
- Political party: Democratic (before 1996); Republican (1996–2021)
- Spouses: Sandra (1970s–1988); Miriam Farbstein (m. 1991)
- Children: 5

Sheldon Gary Adelson (August 4, 1933 – January 11, 2021) was an American businessman, investor, and political donor. He was the founder, chairman and chief executive officer of Las Vegas Sands Corporation, which founded the Marina Bay Sands luxury resort in Singapore, and the parent company of Venetian Macao Limited, which operated The Venetian Las Vegas and the Sands Expo and Convention Center. He owned the Israeli free daily newspaper Israel Hayom, the Israeli weekly newspaper Makor Rishon, and the American daily newspaper the Las Vegas Review-Journal.

Adelson created the Adelson Foundation in 2007, a private charity focusing on healthcare and support of Israel and the Jewish people. He was a major contributor to Republican Party candidates and was often dubbed a "kingmaker" due to the size and frequency of his donations. He was Donald Trump's largest donor in 2016 and 2020, providing the largest donation to Trump's 2016 campaign, his presidential inauguration, his defense fund against the Mueller investigation into Russian interference, and his 2020 campaign. He was also a major backer of Israel's prime minister Benjamin Netanyahu.

In 2020, Forbes listed his net worth as US$29.8 billion.

== Early life ==
Adelson was born on August 4, 1933, and grew up in the Dorchester neighborhood of Boston, the son of Sarah (née Tonkin) and Arthur Adelson. He was Jewish. His father's family was of Ukrainian Jewish and Lithuanian Jewish ancestry. His mother emigrated from England, and Adelson said that his grandfather was a Welsh coal miner. His father was a taxi driver, and his mother ran a knitting shop.

He began his business career at the age of 10 when he borrowed $200 from his uncle and purchased a license to sell newspapers in Boston. In 1948, at the age of 15, he borrowed $10,000 from his uncle to start a candy vending-machine business. He attended the City College of New York, but did not graduate. He attended trade school in a failed attempt to become a court reporter, then joined the United States Army.

After being discharged from the army, he established a business selling toiletry kits, then started another business, De-Ice-It, which marketed a chemical spray that cleared ice from windshields. In the 1960s, he started a charter tour business. He soon became a millionaire, although by his thirties he had built and lost his fortune twice. Over his business career, Adelson created more than fifty companies.

== Business career ==
=== COMDEX ===
In the late 1970s, Adelson and his partners developed the COMDEX trade shows for the computer industry, beginning in 1979. It was one of the largest computer trade shows in the world through much of the 1980s and 1990s.

In 1995, Adelson and his partners sold the Interface Group Show Division, including the COMDEX shows, to SoftBank Group of Japan for $862 million; Adelson's share was over $500 million.

=== Sands Casino ===
==== Las Vegas, Nevada ====
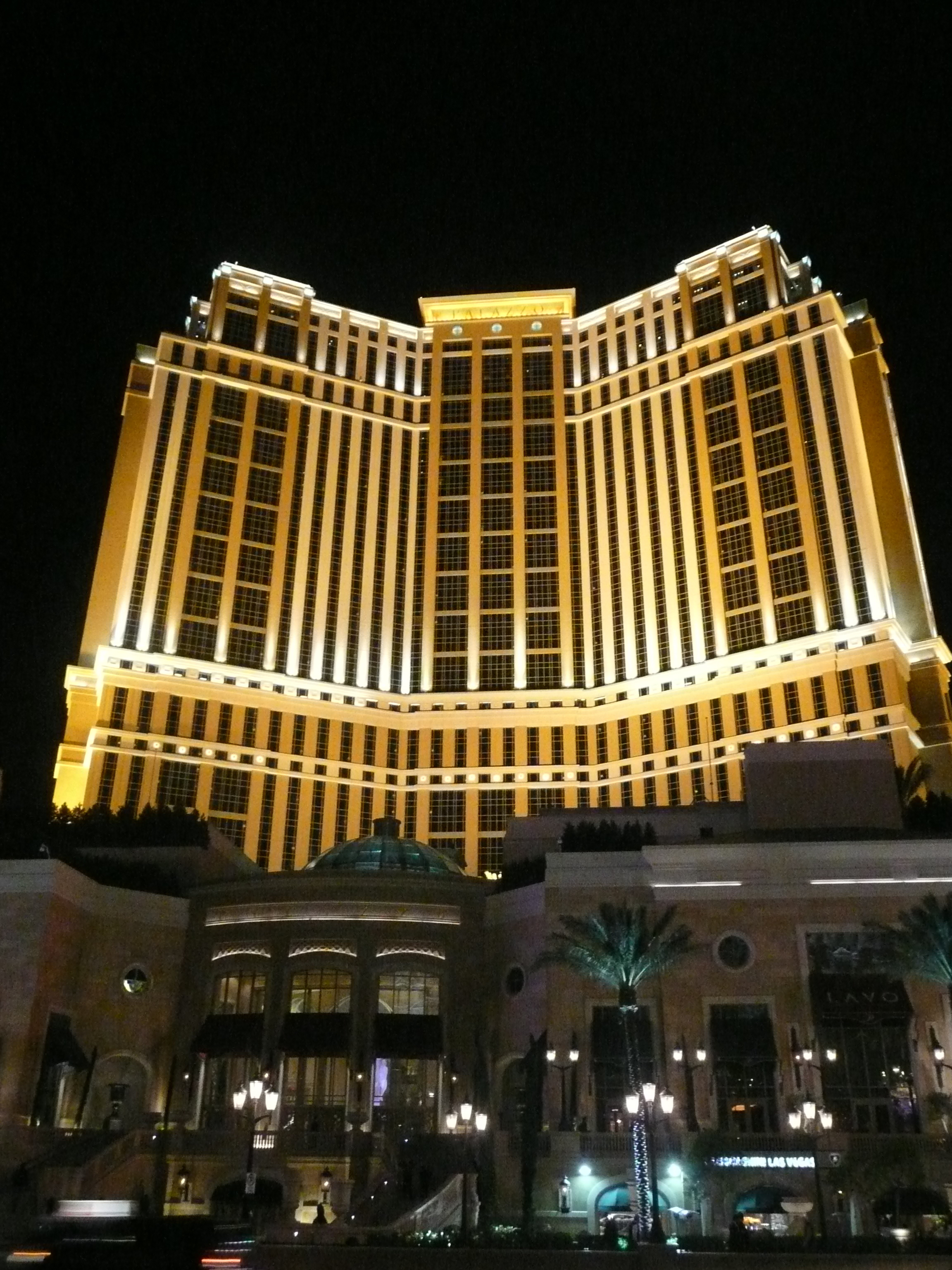
The Palazzo, Las Vegas

In 1988, Adelson and his partners purchased the Sands Hotel and Casino in Las Vegas for $110 million (approximately equivalent to $299,450,000 in 2025). The next year, he and his partners built the Sands Expo and Convention Center, then the only privately owned and operated convention center in the U.S.

In 1991, while honeymooning in Venice with his second wife, Miriam, Adelson came up with the idea for a Venice-themed resort hotel and casino. He bought out his partners and then razed the Sands. He spent $1.5 billion to construct The Venetian, which opened on May 3, 1999.

==== Bethlehem, Pennsylvania ====
In the late 2000s, Adelson and the company built a casino resort in Bethlehem, Pennsylvania. It is one of five stand-alone casinos that were awarded a slots license by the Pennsylvania Gaming Control Board in 2006. The casino opened May 22, 2009.

In 2010, during the Great Recession, Adelson told The Wall Street Journal "If it were today, we probably wouldn't have started it."

In 2019, the Las Vegas Sands Corp. sold the Bethlehem casino for $1.3 billion to Alabama-based Wind Creek Hospitality. The new owner, Wind Creek Hospitality, is owned by the Poarch Band of Creek Indians. The casino's new name is the Wind Creek Bethlehem.

==== Macau ====
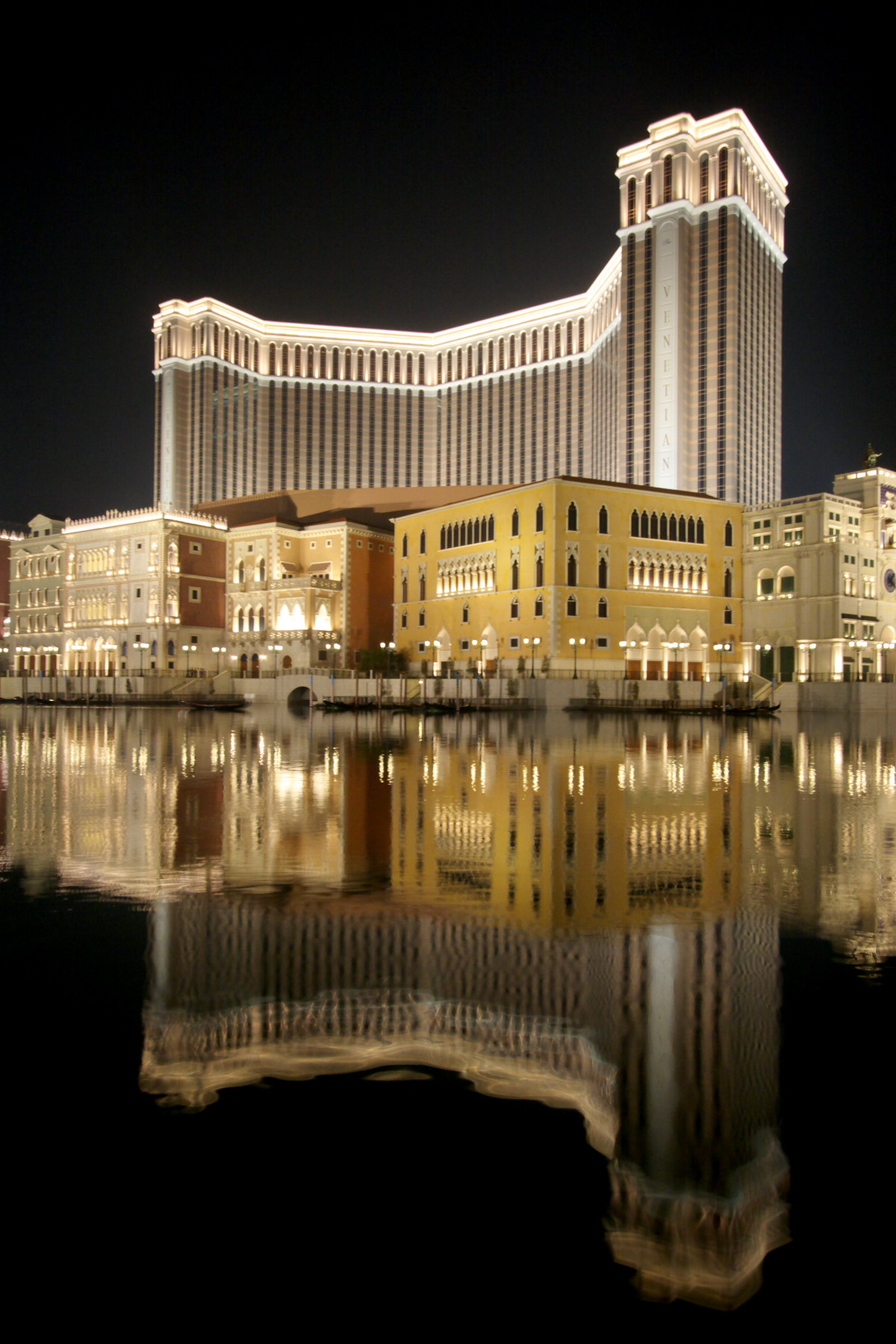
The Venetian Macau, the seventh-largest building in the world by floor space

Adelson led a project to bring Las Vegas Sands casinos to Macau. The 1,000,000 square feet (93,000 m^{2}) Sands Macao became China's first Las Vegas-style casino when it opened in May 2004. He recovered his initial $265-million investment in one year and, because he owned 69% of the stock, he increased his wealth when he took the stock public in December 2004. Following the opening of the Sands Macao, Adelson's personal wealth multiplied more than fourteen times.

In August 2007, Adelson opened the $2.4 billion Venetian Macao Resort Hotel on Cotai and announced that he planned to create a massive, concentrated resort area he called the Cotai Strip, after its Las Vegas counterpart. Adelson said that he planned to open more hotels under brands such as Four Seasons, Sheraton, and St. Regis. His Las Vegas Sands planned to invest $12 billion and build 20,000 hotel rooms on the Cotai Strip by 2010.

Adelson's company was reportedly under federal investigation over alleged violations of the Foreign Corrupt Practices Act relating to payments made to a Macau lawyer. In 2015, Sands agreed to pay a $9 million settlement with the Securities and Exchange Commission, which included no admission of wrongdoing.

==== Marina Bay, Singapore ====
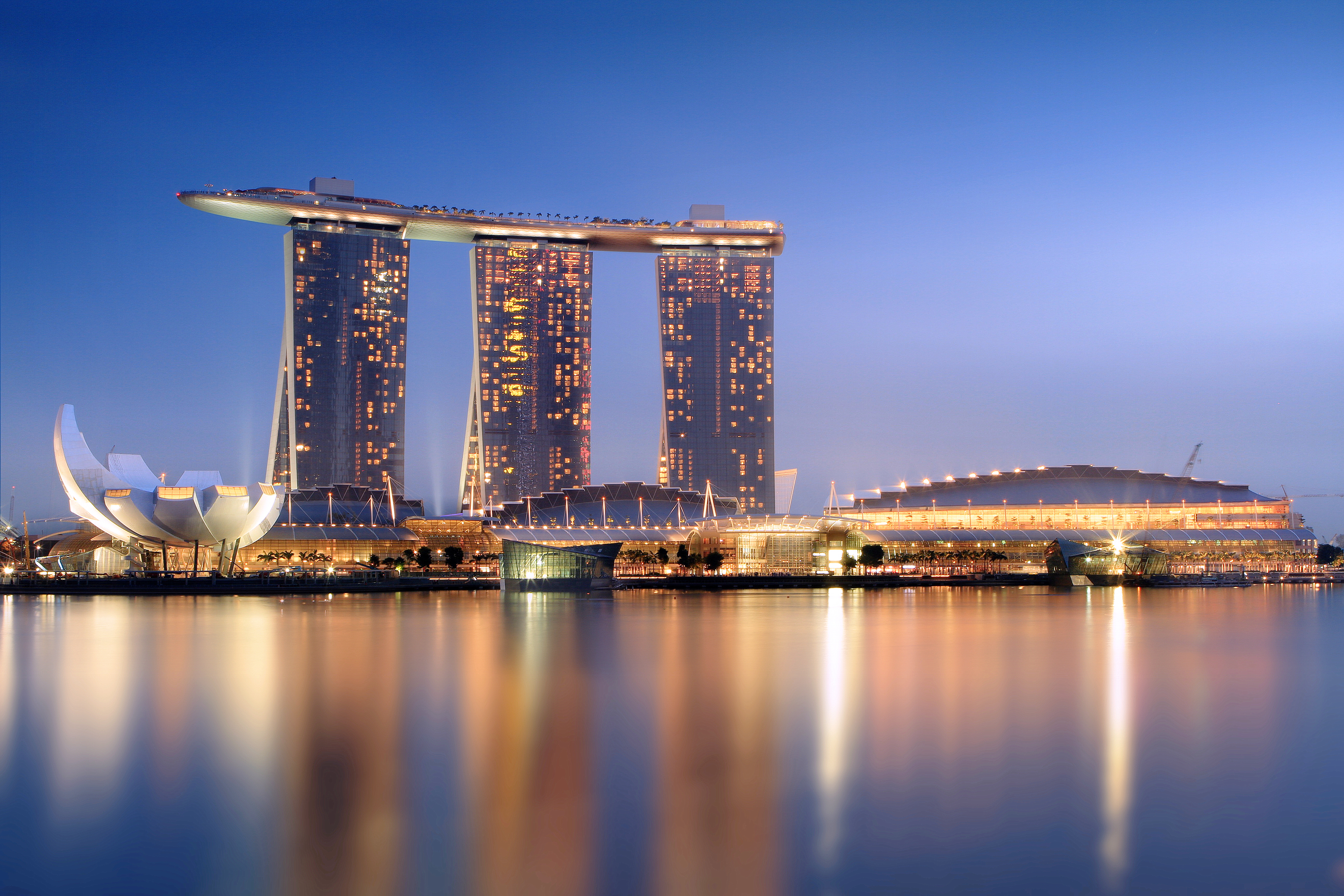
Marina Bay Sands, Singapore, the twelfth-most expensive building in the world

In May 2006, Adelson's Las Vegas Sands was awarded a hotly contested license to construct a casino resort in Marina Bay, Singapore. The new casino, Marina Bay Sands, opened in 2010 at a rumored cost of $5.5 billion.

In 2010, when it opened, at a total cost of S$8 billion including land cost, the Marina Bay Sands (MBS) Complex of Singapore was the most expensive building in the world, ranking over the new development of World Trade Towers in Manhattan of New York and the Burj Khalifa of Dubai.

MBS Singapore includes stores at "The Shoppes", an ultraluxury indoor Venetian canal-lined exclusive shopping belt with tenants such as Ferrari, Chanel, the Theatre of Marina Bay and Convention Center for Sands Live concert series, multiple swimming pools, a rooftop infinity pool, night clubs in Maison pavilions on newly constructed mini islands, and 2,500 luxury hotel rooms.

==== Eurovegas ====
In 2012, Adelson proposed a hotel-casino complex in Europe, later narrowing it to Alcorcón, Madrid, Spain. The project was expected to create 250,000 jobs at a time when the Spanish unemployment rate stood at 27%. The project was cancelled in 2013 due to disagreements with the Spanish government over gambling taxes and smoking laws.

== Other activities ==
=== Israeli press ===
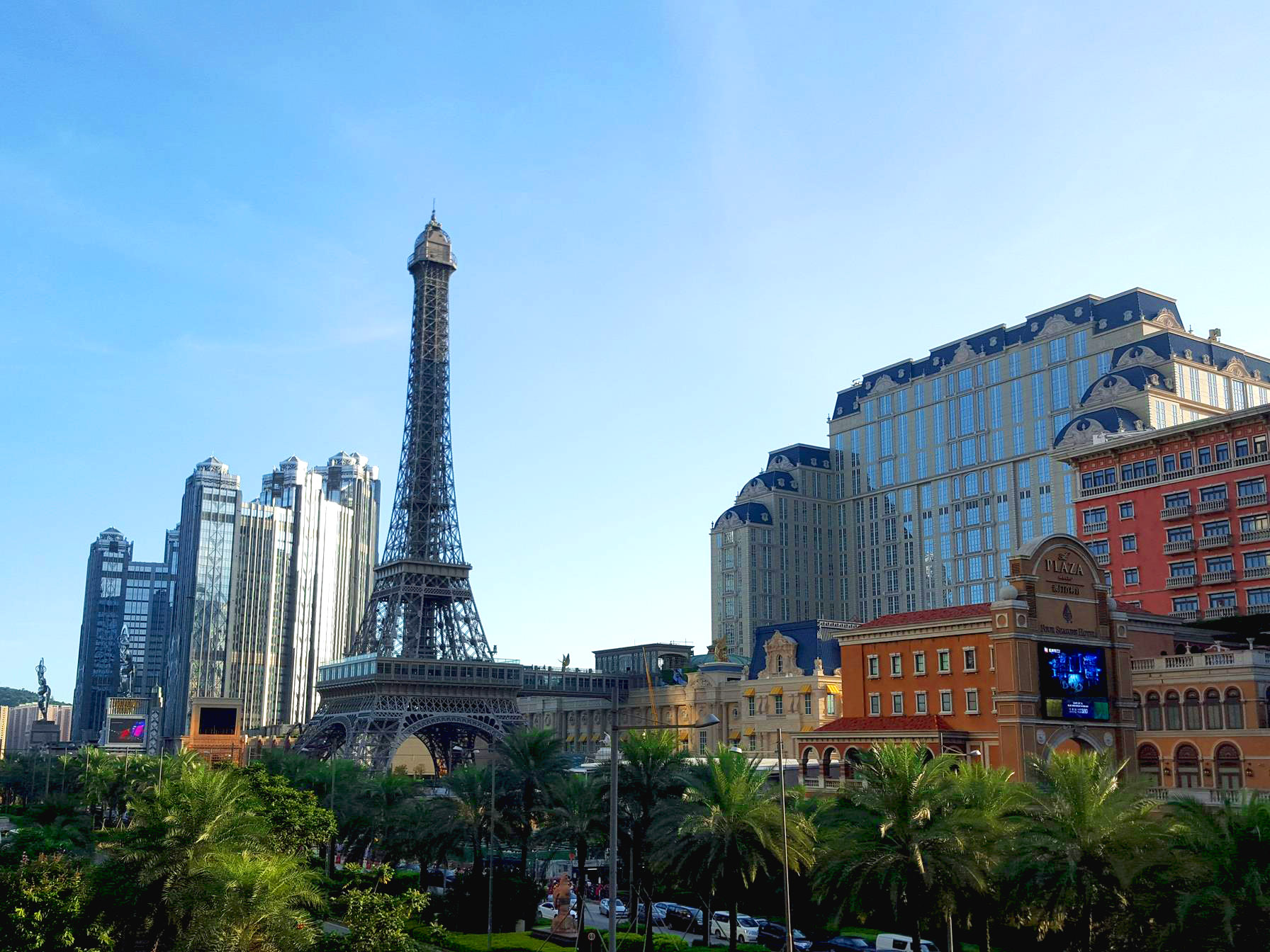
The Parisian Macao, a $2.5 billion project

In 2007, Adelson made an unsuccessful bid to purchase the Israeli newspaper Maariv. When this attempt failed, he proceeded with parallel plans to publish a free daily newspaper to compete with Israeli, a newspaper he had co-founded in 2006 but had left. The first edition of the new newspaper, Israel Hayom, was published on July 30, 2007. On March 31, 2014, Adelson received the go-ahead from a Jerusalem court to purchase Maariv and the conservative newspaper Makor Rishon. In 2016, Adelson's attorney announced that he does not own Israel Hayom, but that it is owned by a relative of his.

According to a Target Group Index (TGI) survey published in July 2011, Israel Hayom, which unlike all other Israeli newspapers is distributed for free, became the number-one daily newspaper (on weekdays) four years after its inception. This survey found that Israel Hayom had a 39.3% weekday readership exposure, Yedioth Ahronoth 37%, Maariv 12.1%, and Haaretz 5.8%. The Yedioth Ahronoth weekend edition was still leading with a 44.3% readership exposure, compared to 31% for the Israel Hayom weekend edition, 14.9% for Maariv, and 6.8% for Haaretz. This trend was already observed by a TGI survey in July 2010.

In 2011, the Israeli press said that Adelson was unhappy with the coverage on Israeli Channel 10 alleging he had acquired a casino license in Las Vegas inappropriately through political connections. The channel apologized after Adelson threatened a lawsuit. This led to the resignations of the news chief, Reudor Benziman; the news editor, Ruti Yuval; and the news anchor, Guy Zohar, who objected to the apology. After two months of deliberations, the Israeli Second Authority for Television and Radio ruled that although there were some flaws in the manner in which the apology had been conducted, the decision to apologize had been correct and appropriate.

=== Las Vegas Review-Journal ===
In December 2015, Adelson purchased the Las Vegas Review-Journal newspaper. The purchase was made through a limited liability company called News + Media Capital Group LLC and his involvement with the deal was initially kept secret. A week after the purchase was announced, three Review-Journal reporters revealed that the deal had been orchestrated by Adelson's son-in-law Patrick Dumont on Adelson's behalf. Commentators described the $140 million paid for the paper as "lavish" and as a dramatic overpayment, and speculated that the move was a power play to further Adelson's business or political agendas.

Within a few weeks the paper's editor stepped down in a voluntary buyout. In January 2016, a set of editorial principles were drawn up and publicized to ensure the newspaper's independence and to deal with possible conflicts of interest involving Adelson's ownership. In February Craig Moon, a veteran of the Gannett organization, was announced as the new publisher and promptly withdrew those principles from publication. He also began to personally review, edit, and sometimes kill stories about an Adelson-promoted proposal for a new Las Vegas football stadium. In the months since, reporters say that stories about Adelson, and particularly about an ongoing lawsuit involving his business dealings in Macau, have been heavily edited by top management.

Many reporters and editors left the newspaper citing "curtailed editorial freedom, murky business dealings and unethical managers." All three reporters who originally broke the story about Adelson's ownership have left. Longtime columnist John L. Smith, who had often written about Adelson and had been unsuccessfully sued for libel by him, resigned after he was told he could no longer write anything about Adelson.

The Las Vegas Review-Journal was the first major newspaper nationwide to endorse Trump in 2016.

=== U.S. policy on Iran ===
In a panel discussion at Yeshiva University on October 22, 2013, Adelson said that the United States must get tougher on the issue of Iran's suspected nuclear weapons program. He said: "You pick up your cell phone and you call somewhere in Nebraska and you say 'OK, let it go' and so there's an atomic weapon goes over, ballistic missiles in the middle of the desert that doesn't hurt a soul, maybe a couple of rattlesnakes and scorpions or whatever". He explained that, after a show of force and a threat to also drop a nuclear bomb on Tehran, the U.S. should then say: if "You [Iran] want to be peaceful, just reverse it all and we will guarantee that you can have a nuclear power plant for electricity purposes, energy purposes." Adelson's spokesman told reporters that Adelson "was obviously not speaking literally" about using an atomic bomb in the desert, and that he was "using hyperbole to make a point that ... actions speak louder than words".

=== DeLay controversy ===
During the Suen trial, Bill Weidner, the president of Adelson's Las Vegas Sands company, testified about a telephone conversation between Adelson and his friend then-House Majority Leader Tom DeLay (R-TX) about a bill proposed by Representative Tom Lantos (D) that would have prevented the U.S. Olympic Committee from voting in favor of the Chinese bid to host the 2008 Summer Olympics. A few hours later, DeLay called back and told Adelson he could tell the mayor of Beijing "this bill will never see the light of day". The resolution did not pass. Adelson testified in court that the demise of the resolution "resulted from the press of other legislation, [not from] a deliberate move by DeLay to help his benefactor."

=== Cannabis ===
Fighting cannabis legalization was a personal passion of Adelson, whose son Mitchell died of an overdose of heroin and cocaine. Mitchell used cocaine and heroin from an early age. Adelson believed cannabis is a gateway drug.

=== Israeli-American Council ===
At the November 2017 conference of the Israeli-American Council (IAC), Adelson declared that the organization should become primarily a political lobbying group on Israel-related issues. In contrast to the American Israel Public Affairs Committee (AIPAC), which supports a two-state solution and continued aid to the Palestinians, Adelson charted a course for IAC to oppose both of these positions; Adelson himself opposed a two-state solution. Israeli journalist Chemi Shalev said that IAC had not intended to become a political pressure group and that Adelson had "hijacked" it for his "hard-right agenda".

=== Internet gambling ===
Adelson fought against internet-based gambling in his later life. Despite the legalization, and acceptance from many Las Vegas casino CEOs, Adelson poured money into candidates wanting to overturn state legislation that legalizes online gambling. In early 2015, Adelson publicly backed a bill introduced in the U.S. House of Representatives. The legislation, named the Restore America's Wire Act, was met with mixed reviews by the Republican Party.

=== Honors ===
Adelson and his wife, Miriam Adelson, were presented with the Woodrow Wilson Award for Corporate Citizenship by the Woodrow Wilson International Center for Scholars of the Smithsonian Institution on March 25, 2008.

Adelson received the Chairman's Award from the Nevada Policy Research Institute, a think tank in Las Vegas, for his efforts to advance free market principles in Nevada.

In 2014, Adelson was named to CNBC's list of 200 people who have transformed business over the last 25 years.

== Involvement in politics ==
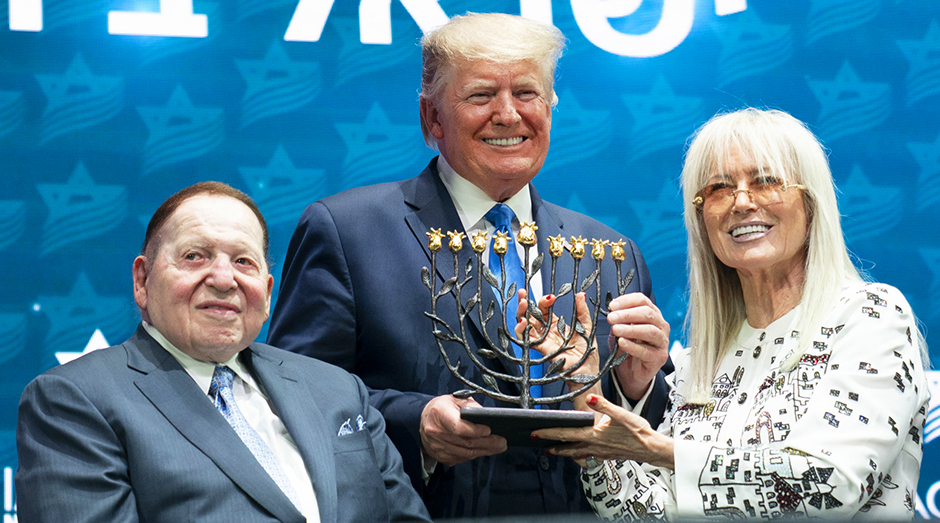
Adelson with Donald Trump in 2019

According to The New Yorker, Adelson began making major contributions to the Republican National Committee following clashes with labor unions at his Las Vegas properties.

The New Yorker article also quoted Shelley Berkley, a Nevada Democratic Party congresswoman, with whom Adelson had a long feud. She worked for him in the 1990s as vice-president of legal and governmental affairs, and said Adelson told her that "old Democrats were with the union and he wanted to break the back of the union, consequently he had to break the back of the Democrats". The Boston Globe said that Adelson "waged some bitter anti-union battles in Las Vegas". Berkley is further quoted in The New Yorker article as saying that Adelson "seeks to dominate politics and public policy through the raw power of money".

In February 2012, Adelson told Forbes magazine that he was "against very wealthy people attempting to or influencing elections. But as long as it's doable I'm going to do it. Because I know that guys like Soros have been doing it for years, if not decades. And they stay below the radar by creating a network of corporations to funnel their money. I have my own philosophy and I'm not ashamed of it. I gave the money because there is no other legal way to do it. I don't want to go through ten different corporations to hide my name. I'm proud of what I do and I'm not looking to escape recognition."

In 2005, Adelson and his wife each contributed $250,000 to the second inauguration of George W. Bush. President George W. Bush appointed the Adelsons to serve on the Honorary Delegation to accompany him to Jerusalem for the celebration of the 60th anniversary of the State of Israel in May 2008.

Adelson was the principal financial backer of Freedom's Watch, a now-defunct political advocacy group founded to counter the influence of George Soros and Democratic-leaning lobby groups such as MoveOn.org. "Almost all" of the $30 million Freedom's Watch spent on the 2008 elections came from Adelson.

In 2010, Adelson donated $1 million to American Solutions for Winning the Future, a political action committee (PAC) supporting Republican former Speaker of the House Newt Gingrich. In December 2011, during Gingrich's bid for the U.S. presidency, Adelson spoke favorably of controversial remarks Gingrich had made about Palestinians, saying "read the history of those who call themselves Palestinians, and you will hear why Gingrich said recently that the Palestinians are an invented people." Adelson donated to U.S. Senate and House of Representatives candidates.

During the 2012 Republican Party presidential primaries, Adelson first supported Newt Gingrich and then the eventual nominee Mitt Romney. Altogether he spent $92 million supporting losing candidates during the 2012 United States presidential election cycle.

On January 7, 2012, Adelson bolstered Gingrich's then-faltering campaign with a $5-million donation to the pro-Gingrich super PAC Winning Our Future. By the next day, the super PAC had reserved more than $3.4 million in advertising time in the South Carolina primary, which included production and distribution of a half-hour movie that portrayed Gingrich's political rival Mitt Romney as a "predatory corporate raider". On January 23, Adelson's wife, Miriam, contributed an additional $5 million to the same organization with instructions to use it to advance a "pro-Newt message". Adelson told Forbes that he was willing to donate as much as $100 million to Gingrich. He also donated $5 million to the right-leaning super PAC Congressional Leadership Fund and over $60,000 to the Republican National Committee.

In June 2012, Adelson donated $10 million to the pro-Romney PAC Restore Our Future. In July, Adelson attended a Romney fundraiser held in Jerusalem. Adelson joined Woody Johnson, John Rakolta, Paul Singer, and several dozen other contributors on the trip. According to Bloomberg Businessweek, as of July Adelson had given Republicans more than $30 million for the 2012 election cycle.

Romney believed that the People's Republic of China should have been pressured to drop its presumptively low fixed exchange rate policy; according to Bloomberg, Adelson would have benefitted financially in U.S. dollar terms through his interest in Chinese casinos if the Chinese yuan were to have appreciated.

Early in 2014, Adelson donated $2.5 million to the Drug Free Florida Committee, the political committee trying to defeat Florida's Right to Medical Marijuana Initiative which would legalize medical cannabis in that state. Later in 2014, Adelson donated an additional $1.5 million to the No On 2 campaign. He believed that cannabis is a gateway drug.

According to a 2014 Washington Post report, Adelson's strategy for the 2016 United States presidential election was to support a mainstream candidate capable of winning the presidency. In March 2014 Adelson was set to hold one-on-one chats with possible candidates Jeb Bush, Chris Christie, Scott Walker, and John Kasich during the spring meeting of the Republican Jewish Coalition held at Adelson's hotel and casino The Venetian Las Vegas. During the December 2015 Republican debate held at that same venue, Adelson held one-on-one meetings with several of the candidates prior to the start of the debate, including front runner Donald Trump. The bidding to become Adelson's favorite, and ultimately receive tens of millions in financial support, was informally called "The Adelson Primary". On May 13, 2016, he endorsed Trump for president, and pledged as much as $100 million to support his campaign. Adelson was later described as a Trump partisan.

In October 2016, Adelson donated one million dollars to the campaign against Massachusetts ballot question 4 the Massachusetts Legalization, Regulation and Taxation of Marijuana Initiative which legalized marijuana for personal use. Adelson also donated $1,500,000 towards the unsuccessful effort to thwart the 2016 Florida medical Marijuana Legalization Initiative.

Adelson sat out the 2016 Republican primaries, with some early indicators at the beginning of 2016 interpreted as showing that Adelson favored Trump. In May 2016, explaining his reasons for officially endorsing Donald Trump's presidential bid, Adelson cited the importance of CEO experience in a presidential nominee.

For the 2018 United States elections, Adelson donated approximately $113 million to the Republican Party through various conservative political action committees.

On January 31, 2019, ABC News reported that Adelson and his wife Miriam had contributed $500,000 to the Patriot Legal Expense Fund Trust, which was set up in 2018 to assist aides of President Trump under investigation by special counsel Robert Mueller's probe into Russian interference in the 2016 United States elections. The contributions are the Trust's largest to date.

It was estimated Adelson would donate $200 million to Trump and the GOP for the 2020 election cycle. Given a call to Adelson by Trump in early August complaining that Adelson had not done enough for him, there was speculation that the amount of a donation could be affected. On October 15, 2020, Adelson gave $75 million to a Trump PAC, in a late push for reelection. In the second half of October 2020, Adelson and his wife gave a further $35 million to three super-PACs supporting the Republican Party and Trump's re-election. PACs to which the Adelsons donated in the 2020 cycle included Preserve America and the Senate Leadership Fund.

== Donations ==
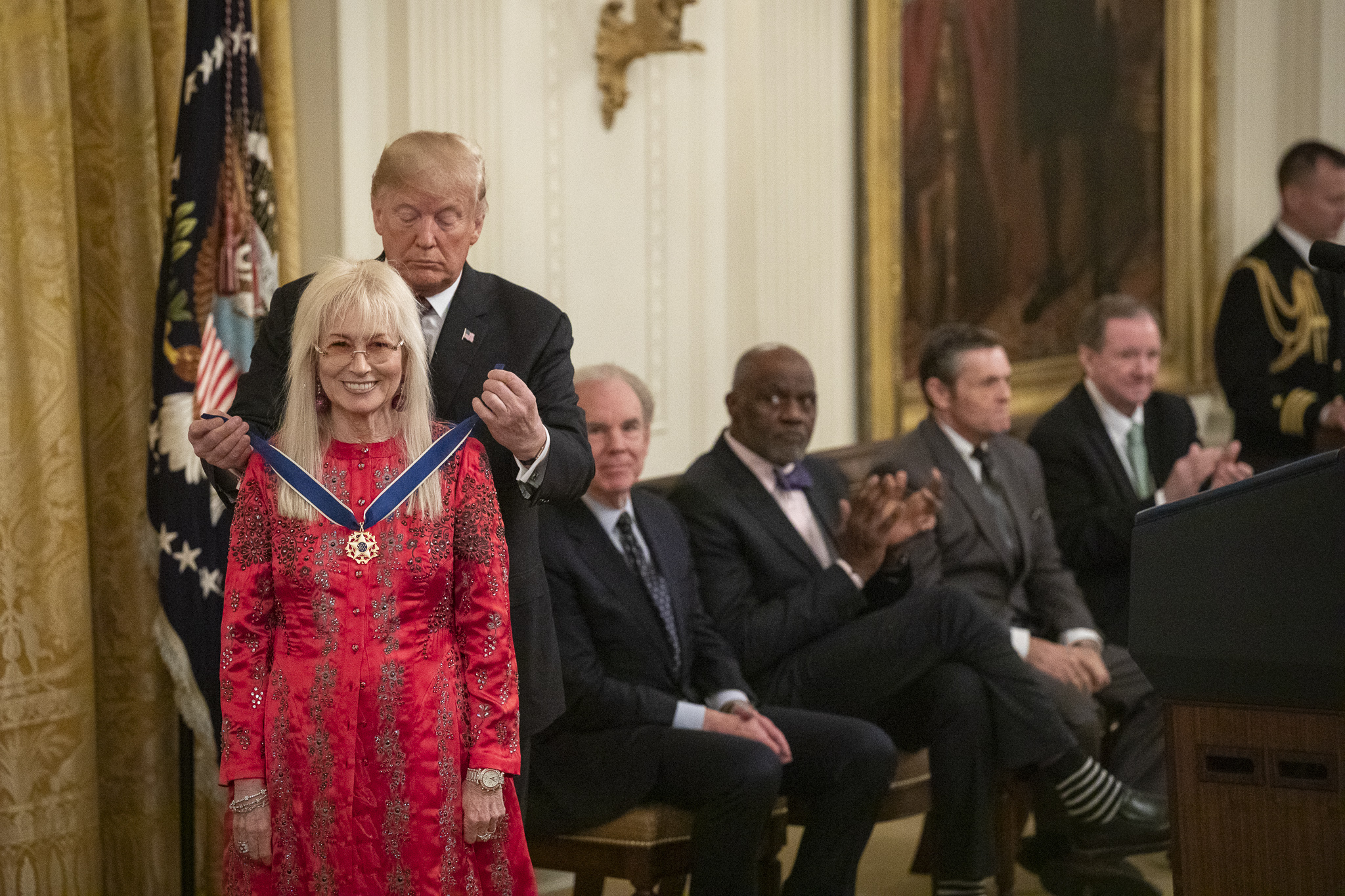
Donald Trump presents the Medal of Freedom to Adelson's wife.

On September 23, 2016, Adelson announced a $25 million donation to Trump's presidential campaign, as part of a $65 million donation to the Republican electoral campaign for 2016. This rendered Adelson by far the biggest donor in either party (Republicans or Democrats) in the 2016 election cycle. It also makes him by far the largest donor to Donald Trump's White House bid. Adelson was the largest donor to Trump's inaugural celebrations, with a $5 million donation to the celebrations.

According to federal records, from 2010 through 2020, Adelson and his wife donated more than $500 million to Republican Party campaigns and super PACs.

Since 2007, the Adelson Family Foundation has made contributions totaling $140 million to Birthright Israel, which finances Jewish youth trips to Israel. He also donated $5 million to the Friends of the Israel Defense Forces in 2014. Adelson donated over $25 million to The Adelson Educational Campus in Las Vegas to build a high school. In 2006, Adelson contributed $25 million to the Yad Vashem Holocaust Martyrs' and Heroes' Remembrance Authority.

Adelson also funded the private, Boston-based Miriam and Sheldon G. Adelson Medical Research Foundation. This foundation initiated the Adelson Program in Neural Repair and Rehabilitation (APNRR) with $7.5 million donated to collaborating researchers at 10 universities.

== Personal life ==
=== Marriages ===
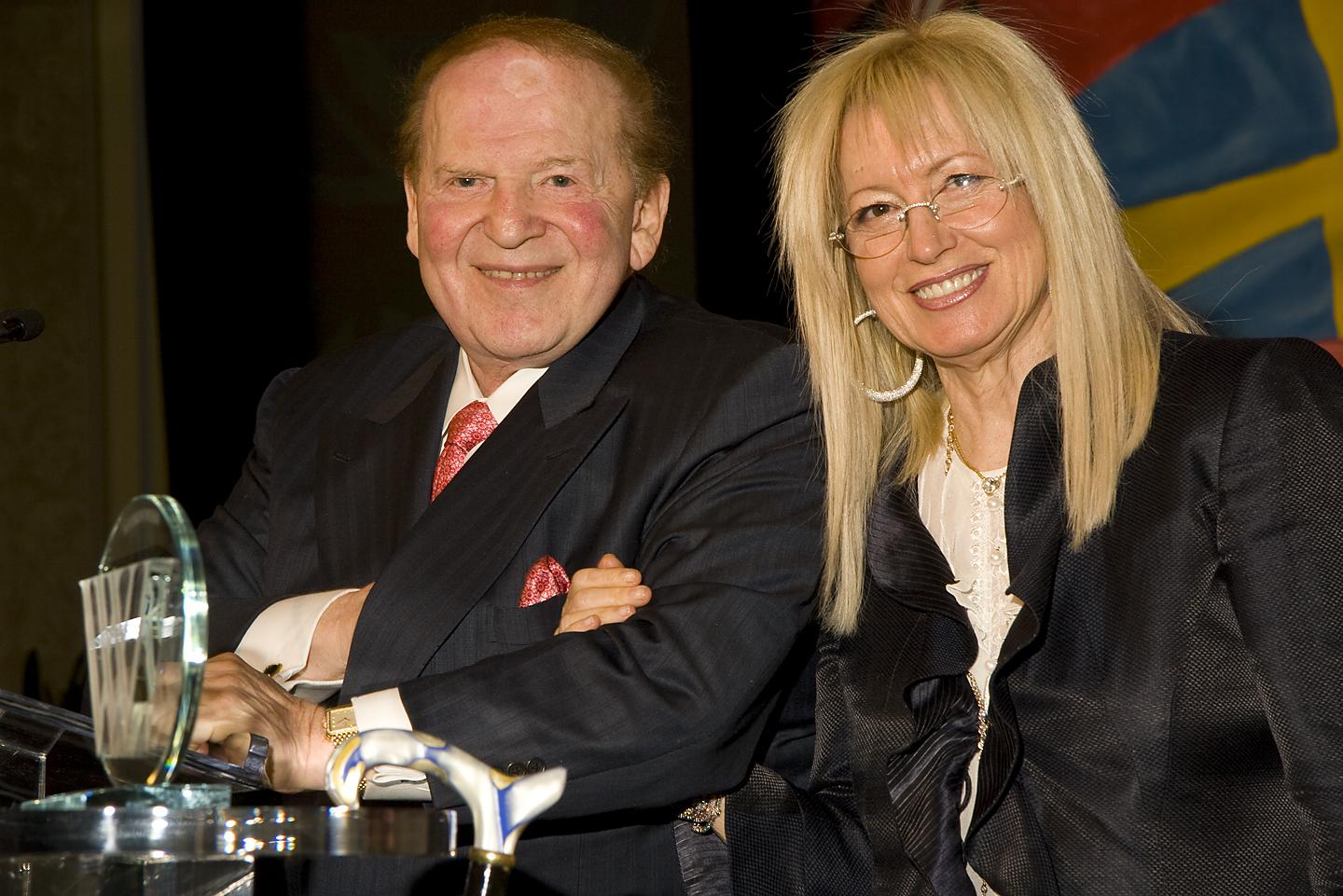
Sheldon and Miriam Adelson, at the 2008 Woodrow Wilson Awards

In the 1970s, Sheldon Adelson lived in Massachusetts with his wife, Sandra, and her three children, Mitchell, Gary, and Shelley, whom Sheldon adopted when they were young. The couple divorced in 1988.

Adelson met Miriam Farbstein Ochshorn, a medical doctor, on a blind date the following year; they married in 1991. She was previously married to a Tel Aviv physician, Dr. Ariel Ochshorn, with whom she had two daughters. Miriam "Miri" Farbstein was born in Mandatory Palestine in 1945, to parents that fled Poland before the Holocaust and settled in the city of Haifa. After earning a Bachelor of Science in microbiology and genetics from the Hebrew University of Jerusalem and a medical degree from Tel Aviv University's Sackler Medical School, she went on to become the chief internist in an emergency room at Tel Aviv's Rokach (Hadassah) Hospital. In 1993, she founded a substance abuse center and research clinic there, and in 2000, the couple opened the Dr. Miriam and Sheldon G. Adelson Research Clinic in Las Vegas.

=== Litigation ===
A June 2008 profile in The New Yorker detailed several controversies involving Adelson. In 2008 Richard Suen, a Hong Kong businessman who had helped Adelson make connections with leading Chinese officials in order to obtain the Macau license, took Adelson to court in Las Vegas alleging he had reneged on his agreement to allow Suen to profit from the venture. Suen won a $43.8 million judgement; in November 2010, the Nevada Supreme Court overturned the judgment and returned the case to the lower court for further consideration. In the 2013 retrial, the jury awarded Suen a verdict for $70 million. The judge added another $31.6 million in interest, bringing the total judgment against Adelson to $101.6 million. Adelson was in the process of appealing again. Adelson faced another trial over claims by three alleged "middlemen" in the deal who sued for at least $450 million.

In February 2013, the Las Vegas Sands, in a regulatory filing, acknowledged that it had likely violated federal law that prohibits the bribing of foreign officials. Allegedly, Chinese officials were bribed to allow Adelson to build his Macau casino.

Adelson successfully sued the London Daily Mail for libel in 2008. The newspaper had accused him of pursuing "despicable business practices" and having "habitually and corruptly bought political favour". Adelson won the libel case, which was described as "a grave slur on Mr Adelson's personal integrity and business reputation," and he won a judgment of approximately £4 million, which he said he would donate to London's Royal Marsden Hospital.

In August 2012, the Democratic Congressional Campaign Committee (DCCC), after being threatened with a libel suit, apologized and withdrew two blog posts that claimed Adelson had donated "Chinese prostitution money" to Republicans. Another organization, the National Jewish Democratic Council, posted on their website that Adelson "personally approved" of prostitution at his Macau resorts. Adelson sued for libel, but a federal judge dismissed the suit in September 2013, ordering Adelson to pay the NJDC's legal fees.

Prior to Adelson's death, he had been scheduled to testify in the corruption trial against Israeli Prime Minister Benjamin Netanyahu.

=== Wealth ===
In 2007, Adelson's estimated wealth was $26.5 billion, making him the third-richest person in the United States according to Forbes, and $26 billion for 2008.

In 2008, the share prices of the Las Vegas Sands Corp. plunged. In November 2008, Las Vegas Sands Corp. announced it might default on bonds that it had outstanding, signaling the potential bankruptcy of the concern. Adelson lost $4 billion in 2008, more than any other American billionaire. In 2009, his net worth had declined from approximately $30 billion to $2 billion, a drop of 93%. He told ABC News "So I lost $25 billion. I started out with zero ...[there is] no such thing as fear, not to an entrepreneur. Concern, yes. Fear, no". In the Forbes 2009 world billionaires list, Adelson's ranking dropped to No. 178 with a net worth of $3.4 billion, but by 2011, after his business had recovered, he was ranked as the world's 16th-richest man with a net worth of $23.3 billion.

In 2013, Adelson earned a top ranking on Forbes' Annual "Biggest Winner" List, his dramatic growth a result of the success of his casinos in Macau and Singapore, adding an estimated $15 billion to his net worth during the year. In 2013, Adelson was worth $37.2 billion according to Forbes, and in December 2014, his net worth was $30.4 billion.

Adelson owned a fleet of private jets through Las Vegas Sands. On January 2, 2017, Adelson's Airbus A340-500 jet set a record for the Ben Gurion International Airport by making the longest flight ever leaving the airport by flying nonstop to Honolulu, Hawaii, by way of the Arctic Ocean.

=== Illness and death ===
In 2001, Adelson was diagnosed with peripheral neuropathy, which restricted his ability to stand and walk.

On February 28, 2019, Las Vegas Sands announced that Adelson was receiving treatment for non-Hodgkin's lymphoma. The news was disclosed after a Sands attorney claimed Adelson was too weak to sit for a deposition in a court case involving Richard Suen. Sands spokesman Ron Reese said the side effects of Adelson's medical treatment had "restricted his availability to travel or keep regular office hours” but had not "prevented him from fulfilling his duties as chairman and CEO" of Las Vegas Sands.

On January 11, 2021, Adelson died at his home in Malibu, California, at the age of 87, after long-term illnesses.

On January 14, 2021, Adelson's body arrived in Israel. His coffin was draped in U.S. and Israeli flags and was on display at Ben Gurion Airport, where Prime Minister Benjamin Netanyahu came to pay his respects. Adelson was buried the next day, in a small private ceremony on the Mount of Olives in East Jerusalem.

== See also ==
- List of people and organizations named in the Paradise Papers
