= Israel Hayom =

Israeli daily newspaper

- Front page, 27 July 2016
- Type: Free daily newspaper
- Format: Tabloid
- Publisher: Miriam Adelson
- Editor-in-chief: Omer Lachmanovitch
- General manager: Amir Finkelstein
- News editor: Uri Dagon
- Photo editor: Ami Shooman
- Launched: 30 July 2007; 19 years ago
- Political alignment: Centre-right to right-wing Conservatism; National liberalism
- Language: Hebrew (print and online); English (online)
- Headquarters: 2 Ha-Shlosha St., Tel Aviv
- Country: Israel
- Circulation: 275,000 (as of 2017)
- Readership: 31%; (as of 2021)
- Sister newspapers: Makor Rishon
- OCLC number: 234764640
- Website: israelhayom.com israelhayom.co.il
- Free online archives: digital-edition.israelhayom.co.il

Israel Hayom (Hebrew: יִשְׂרָאֵל הַיּוֹם, lit. 'Israel Today') is an Israeli Hebrew-language free daily newspaper. Distributed for free around Israel, it is the country's most widely distributed newspaper. Owned by the family of Sheldon Adelson, the casino mogul and political donor, Israel Hayom has been noted for its right-wing editorial stance and coverage of Israeli politics, often sparking debate about its political alignment.

== History ==
Israel Hayom's print edition, "financed by the American casino billionaire Sheldon Adelson," was launched on 30 July 2007, competing directly with Israeli, another free daily. That same year, Maariv editor Dan Margalit left the newspaper to write for Israel Hayom. A weekend edition was launched in October 2009. In 2014, Israel Hayom bought Israeli media outlets Makor Rishon and nrg מעריב.

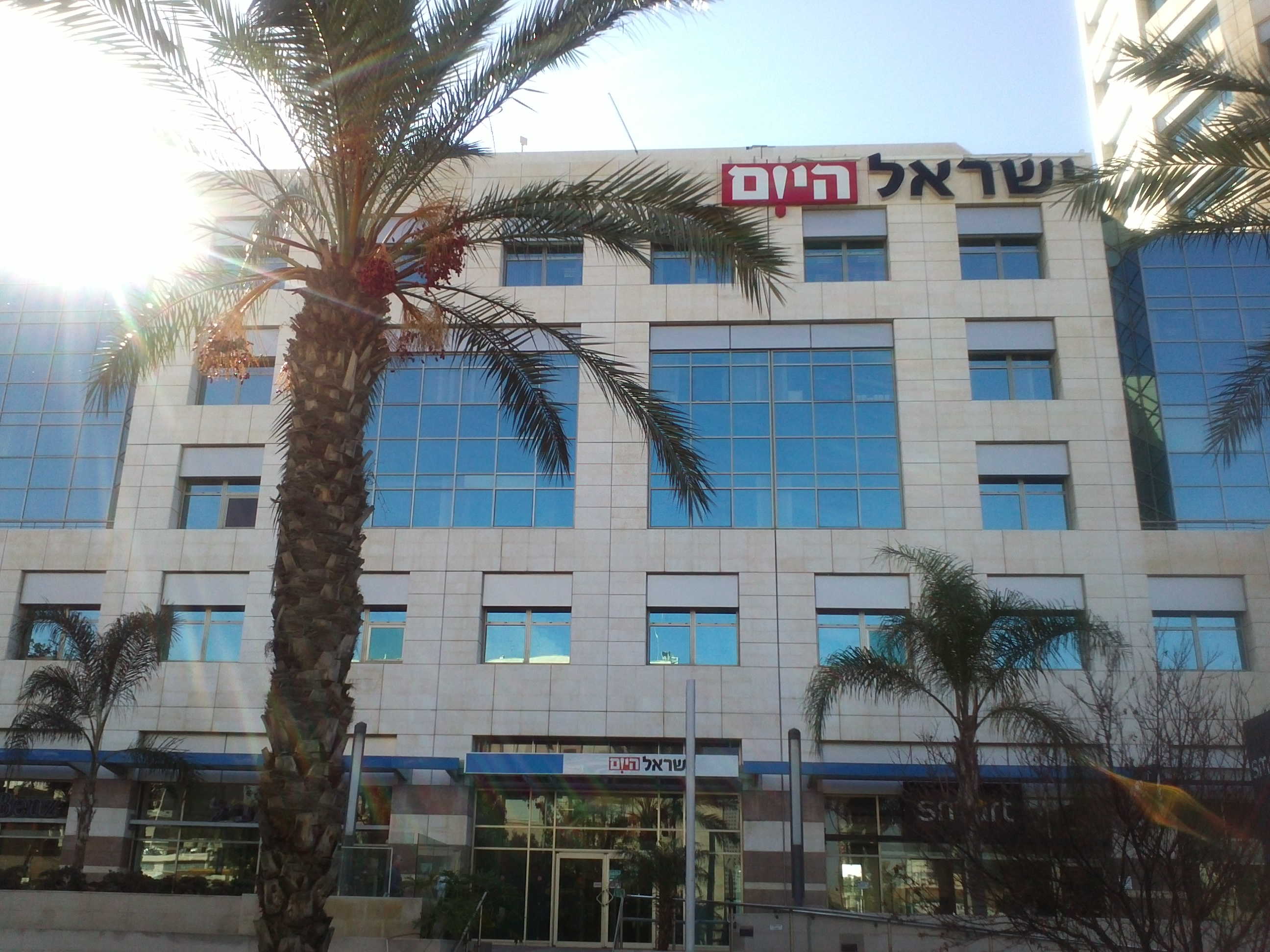
The Israel Hayom headquarters in Tel Aviv

In May 2014 the name מעריב (Maariv) was removed from nrg log, and it was rebranded as nrg. Following the acquisition, an antitrust complaint was filed against Israel Hayom, which resulted in a court order that requested the transfer of the maariv domain name to Maariv weekly. In 2017, nrg was renamed to nrg360, and on 10 January 2018 the website closed; all of its content was merged into the Makor Rishon website.

Later that year, it is believed, was when Sheldon Adelson invested at least $50 million in Israel Hayom. Critics of Adelson's involvement claimed that the distribution of free newspapers hurt free enterprise and targeted Israel's print newspaper industry, as Israel Hayom was then Israel's only free-of-charge national newspaper. The bill passed the first reading in the Knesset, but not subsequent ones. In 2016, Adelson's attorney announced that although it was commonly believed that Adelson owned the newspaper, it was owned by a relative of his.

In January 2021, Saudi-American independent academic researcher, Najat Al-Saied, became the first person from the Arab states of the Persian Gulf to join Israel Hayom.

In June 2024, Israel Hayom announced a significant partnership with the tabloid Bild, Germany's biggest Springer news outfit. It involves joint articles and investigations that are published simultaneously in both countries.

== Political leaning ==
By 2016, Israel Hayom extended its influence beyond Israel, endorsing the presidential campaign of Donald Trump, marking a notable alignment with conservative movements on a global scale. This endorsement reinforced the perception of the paper as a supporter of right-wing ideologies not only in Israel but also internationally.

== Market share ==
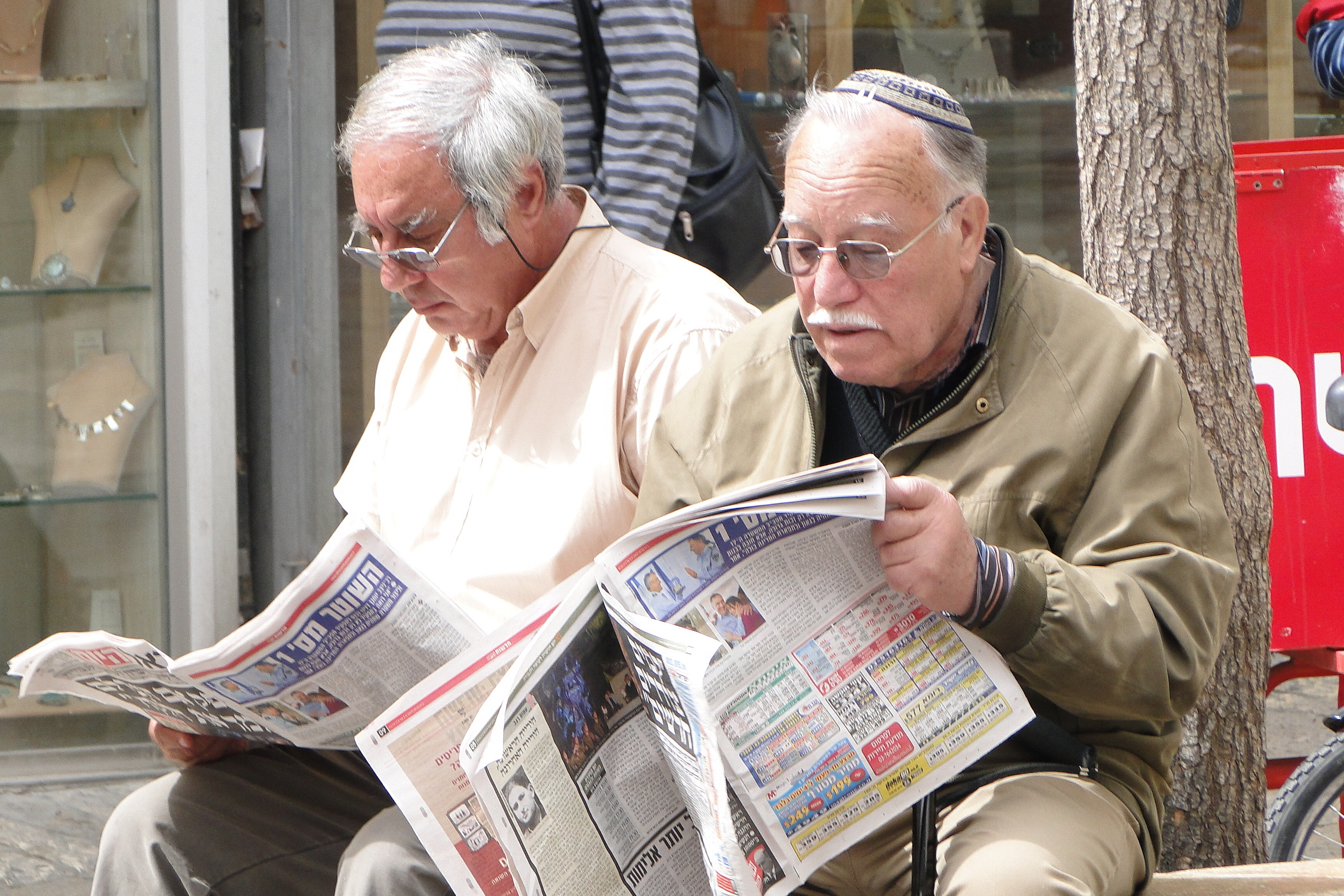
Israel Hayom readers in Jerusalem

In July 2010, Israel Hayom surpassed Yedioth Ahronoth in weekday exposure rate in the semi-annual Target Group Index (TGI) survey.

As of 1 January 2024, a TGI survey indicated that Israel Hayom, distributed for free, is Israel's most read newspaper, with a 27.4% weekday readership exposure, followed by Yedioth Ahronoth, with 22.4%, Haaretz with 5.4%, Maariv with 3.5%, and Globes with 3.2%.

As of 31 July 2023, a TGI survey had indicated that Israel Hayom, was Israel's most read newspaper, with a 29.4% weekday readership exposure, followed by Yedioth Ahronoth, with 22.3%, Haaretz with 4.8%, Globes with 4% and Maariv with 3.9%.

In January 2016, citing internal records from Israel Hayom, Haaretz revealed that between 2007 and 2014, the newspaper lost about 730 million shekels ($190 million), approximately equal to a shekel per copy printed.

== Notable employees ==
Miriam Adelson is the publisher; commentators include Dan Margalit, Aviad Hacohen, and Shlomo Scharf; Yoav Kutner is a music critic.

== See also ==
- List of free daily newspapers
- List of national newspapers
- List of newspapers in Israel
