= Aksenovo =

Aksenovo (Russian: Аксеново) or Aksyonovo (Аксёново) is the name of several rural localities in Russia.

== Modern localities ==
=== Altai Krai ===
As of 2012, one rural locality in Altai Krai bears this name:

- Aksenovo, Altai Krai, a selo in Martynovsky Selsoviet of Yeltsovsky District; 53°16′N 85°52′E

=== Arkhangelsk Oblast ===
As of 2012, one rural locality in Arkhangelsk Oblast bears this name:

- Aksenovo, Arkhangelsk Oblast, a village in Yertsevsky Selsoviet of Konoshsky District

=== Republic of Bashkortostan ===
As of 2012, one rural locality in the Republic of Bashkortostan bears this name:

- Aksenovo, Republic of Bashkortostan, a selo in Aksenovsky Selsoviet of Alsheyevsky District

=== Ivanovo Oblast ===
As of 2012, one rural locality in Ivanovo Oblast bears this name:

- Aksenovo, Ivanovo Oblast, a village in Verkhnelandekhovsky District

=== Kaluga Oblast ===
As of 2012, one rural locality in Kaluga Oblast bears this name:

- Aksenovo, Kaluga Oblast, a village in Iznoskovsky District

=== Kirov Oblast ===
As of 2012, three rural localities in Kirov Oblast bear this name:

- Aksenovo, Afanasyevsky District, Kirov Oblast, a village in Pashinsky Rural Okrug of Afanasyevsky District; 58°42′N 53°24′E
- Aksenovo, Kiknursky District, Kirov Oblast, a village in Potnyakovsky Rural Okrug of Kiknursky District; 57°23′N 47°29′E
- Aksenovo, Sovetsky District, Kirov Oblast, a village in Zashizhemsky Rural Okrug of Sovetsky District; 57°50′N 48°45′E

=== Kostroma Oblast ===
As of 2012, three rural localities in Kostroma Oblast bear this name:

- Aksenovo, Chukhlomsky District, Kostroma Oblast (or Aksyonovo), a village in Nozhkinskoye Settlement of Chukhlomsky District; 58°52′N 42°27′E
- Aksenovo, Galichsky District, Kostroma Oblast (or Aksyonovo), a village in Dmitriyevskoye Settlement of Galichsky District; 58°18′N 42°31′E
- Aksenovo, Sharyinsky District, Kostroma Oblast (or Aksyonovo), a village in Ivanovskoye Settlement of Sharyinsky District; 58°8′N 45°30′E

=== Krasnoyarsk Krai ===
As of 2012, one rural locality in Krasnoyarsk Krai bears this name:

- Aksenovo, Krasnoyarsk Krai, a village in Kezhemsky District

=== Republic of Mordovia ===
As of 2012, one rural locality in the Republic of Mordovia bears this name:

- Aksenovo, Republic of Mordovia, a selo in Aksenovsky Selsoviet of Lyambirsky District; 54°15′N 45°21′E

=== Moscow Oblast ===
As of 2012, seven rural localities in Moscow Oblast bear this name:

- Aksenovo, Klinsky District, Moscow Oblast, a village in Voroninskoye Rural Settlement of Klinsky District; 56°27′N 36°51′E
- Aksenovo, Lukhovitsky District, Moscow Oblast, a village in Golovachevskoye Rural Settlement of Lukhovitsky District; 54°57′N 39°6′E
- Aksenovo, Orekhovo-Zuyevsky District, Moscow Oblast (or Aksyonovo), a village in Belavinskoye Rural Settlement of Orekhovo-Zuyevsky District; 55°38′N 39°25′E
- Aksenovo, Ramensky District, Moscow Oblast, a village in Vyalkovskoye Rural Settlement of Ramensky District; 55°41′N 38°15′E
- Aksenovo, Shchyolkovsky District, Moscow Oblast (or Aksyonovo), a village under the administrative jurisdiction of Fryanovo Work Settlement in Shchyolkovsky District; 56°6′N 38°25′E
- Aksenovo, Chismenskoye Rural Settlement, Volokolamsky District, Moscow Oblast, a village in Chismenskoye Rural Settlement of Volokolamsky District; 56°1′N 35°50′E
- Aksenovo, Yaropoletskoye Rural Settlement, Volokolamsky District, Moscow Oblast, a village in Yaropoletskoye Rural Settlement of Volokolamsky District; 56°2′N 36°13′E

=== Nizhny Novgorod Oblast ===
As of 2012, four rural localities in Nizhny Novgorod Oblast bear this name:

- Aksenovo, Semyonov, Nizhny Novgorod Oblast, a village in Ogibnovsky Selsoviet under the administrative jurisdiction of the town of oblast significance of Semyonov
- Aksenovo, Gorodetsky District, Nizhny Novgorod Oblast, a village in Smirkinsky Selsoviet of Gorodetsky District
- Aksenovo, Sokolsky District, Nizhny Novgorod Oblast, a village in Loyminsky Selsoviet of Sokolsky District
- Aksenovo, Urensky District, Nizhny Novgorod Oblast, a village in Semenovsky Selsoviet of Urensky District

=== Omsk Oblast ===
As of 2012, two rural localities in Omsk Oblast bear this name:

- Aksenovo, Sargatsky District, Omsk Oblast, a village in Uvalobitiinsky Rural Okrug of Sargatsky District
- Aksenovo, Ust-Ishimsky District, Omsk Oblast, a settlement in Utuskunsky Rural Okrug of Ust-Ishimsky District

=== Perm Krai ===
As of 2012, one rural locality in Perm Krai bears this name:

- Aksenovo, Perm Krai, a selo in Yusvinsky District

=== Pskov Oblast ===
As of 2012, five rural localities in Pskov Oblast bear this name:

- Aksenovo, Bezhanitsky District, Pskov Oblast, a village in Bezhanitsky District
- Aksenovo, Nevelsky District, Pskov Oblast, a village in Nevelsky District
- Aksenovo, Palkinsky District, Pskov Oblast, a village in Palkinsky District
- Aksenovo, Pushkinogorsky District, Pskov Oblast, a village in Pushkinogorsky District
- Aksenovo, Sebezhsky District, Pskov Oblast, a village in Sebezhsky District

=== Ryazan Oblast ===
As of 2012, two rural localities in Ryazan Oblast bear this name:

- Aksenovo, Kasimovsky District, Ryazan Oblast, a village in Pustynsky Rural Okrug of Kasimovsky District
- Aksenovo, Rybnovsky District, Ryazan Oblast, a village in Kuzminsky Rural Okrug of Rybnovsky District

=== Smolensk Oblast ===
As of 2012, one rural locality in Smolensk Oblast bears this name:

- Aksenovo, Smolensk Oblast, a village in Prechistenskoye Rural Settlement of Dukhovshchinsky District

=== Tomsk Oblast ===
As of 2012, one rural locality in Tomsk Oblast bears this name:

- Aksenovo, Tomsk Oblast, a village in Tomsky District

=== Tver Oblast ===
As of 2012, three rural localities in Tver Oblast bear this name:

- Aksenovo, Andreapolsky District, Tver Oblast, a village in Aksenovskoye Rural Settlement of Andreapolsky District
- Aksenovo, Torzhoksky District, Tver Oblast, a village in Sukromlenskoye Rural Settlement of Torzhoksky District
- Aksenovo, Zharkovsky District, Tver Oblast, a village in Shchucheyskoye Rural Settlement of Zharkovsky District

=== Vladimir Oblast ===
As of 2012, four rural localities in Vladimir Oblast bear this name:

- Aksenovo, Gus-Khrustalny District, Vladimir Oblast, a village in Gus-Khrustalny District
- Aksenovo, Petushinsky District, Vladimir Oblast, a village in Petushinsky District
- Aksenovo, Sudogodsky District, Vladimir Oblast, a village in Sudogodsky District
- Aksenovo, Vyaznikovsky District, Vladimir Oblast, a village in Vyaznikovsky District

=== Vologda Oblast ===
As of 2012, eleven rural localities in Vologda Oblast bear this name:

- Aksenovo, Babayevsky District, Vologda Oblast, a village in Kuysky Selsoviet of Babayevsky District
- Aksenovo, Babushkinsky District, Vologda Oblast, a village in Ledengsky Selsoviet of Babushkinsky District
- Aksenovo, Abakanovsky Selsoviet, Cherepovetsky District, Vologda Oblast, a village in Abakanovsky Selsoviet of Cherepovetsky District
- Aksenovo, Musorsky Selsoviet, Cherepovetsky District, Vologda Oblast, a village in Musorsky Selsoviet of Cherepovetsky District
- Aksenovo, Frolovsky Selsoviet, Gryazovetsky District, Vologda Oblast, a village in Frolovsky Selsoviet of Gryazovetsky District
- Aksenovo, Vokhtogsky Selsoviet, Gryazovetsky District, Vologda Oblast, a village in Vokhtogsky Selsoviet of Gryazovetsky District
- Aksenovo, Kirillovsky District, Vologda Oblast, a village in Sukhoverkhovsky Selsoviet of Kirillovsky District
- Aksenovo, Charomsky Selsoviet, Sheksninsky District, Vologda Oblast, a village in Charomsky Selsoviet of Sheksninsky District
- Aksenovo, Fominsky Selsoviet, Sheksninsky District, Vologda Oblast, a village in Fominsky Selsoviet of Sheksninsky District
- Aksenovo, Velikoustyugsky District, Vologda Oblast, a village in Yudinsky Selsoviet of Velikoustyugsky District
- Aksenovo, Vologodsky District, Vologda Oblast, a village in Staroselsky Selsoviet of Vologodsky District

=== Yaroslavl Oblast ===
As of 2012, two rural localities in Yaroslavl Oblast bear this name:

- Aksenovo, Nekrasovsky District, Yaroslavl Oblast, a village in Grebovsky Rural Okrug of Nekrasovsky District
- Aksenovo, Rybinsky District, Yaroslavl Oblast, a selo in Volzhsky Rural Okrug of Rybinsky District

== Alternative names ==
- Aksenovo, alternative name of Aksanovo, a village in Goretovskoye Rural Settlement of Mozhaysky District in Moscow Oblast; 55°35′N 35°52′E

== Other uses ==
- Aksyonovo railway station

== See also ==
- Aksenov (rural locality)
- Aksenovka
