= Sargatsky =

Sargatsky (masculine), Sargatskaya (feminine), or Sargatskoye (neuter) may refer to:

- Sargatsky District, a district of Omsk Oblast, Russia
- Sargatskoye, an urban locality (a work settlement) in Omsk Oblast, Russia
