= Aksenovka =

Aksenovka (Russian: Аксеновка) or Aksyonovka (Аксёновка) is the name of several rural localities in Russia.

== Modern localities ==
- Aksenovka, Altai Krai, a settlement in Novorossiysky Selsoviet of Rubtsovsky District in Altai Krai; 51°51′N 81°22′E
- Aksenovka, Republic of Mordovia, a village in Lopatinsky Selsoviet of Torbeyevsky District in the Republic of Mordovia; 53°59′N 43°7′E
- Aksenovka, Omsk Oblast, a village in Sukhovskoy Rural Okrug of Gorkovsky District in Omsk Oblast
- Aksenovka, Penza Oblast, a village in Yaganovsky Selsoviet of Vadinsky District in Penza Oblast
- Aksenovka, Vladimir Oblast, a village in Alexandrovsky District of Vladimir Oblast

== Alternative names ==
- Aksenovka, alternative name of Aksenovo, a village in Voroninskoye Rural Settlement of Klinsky District in Moscow Oblast; 56°27′N 36°51′E

== See also ==
- Aksenov (rural locality)
- Aksenovo
