= Ringing Cedars' Anastasianism =

New religious movement originating in Russia in 1997

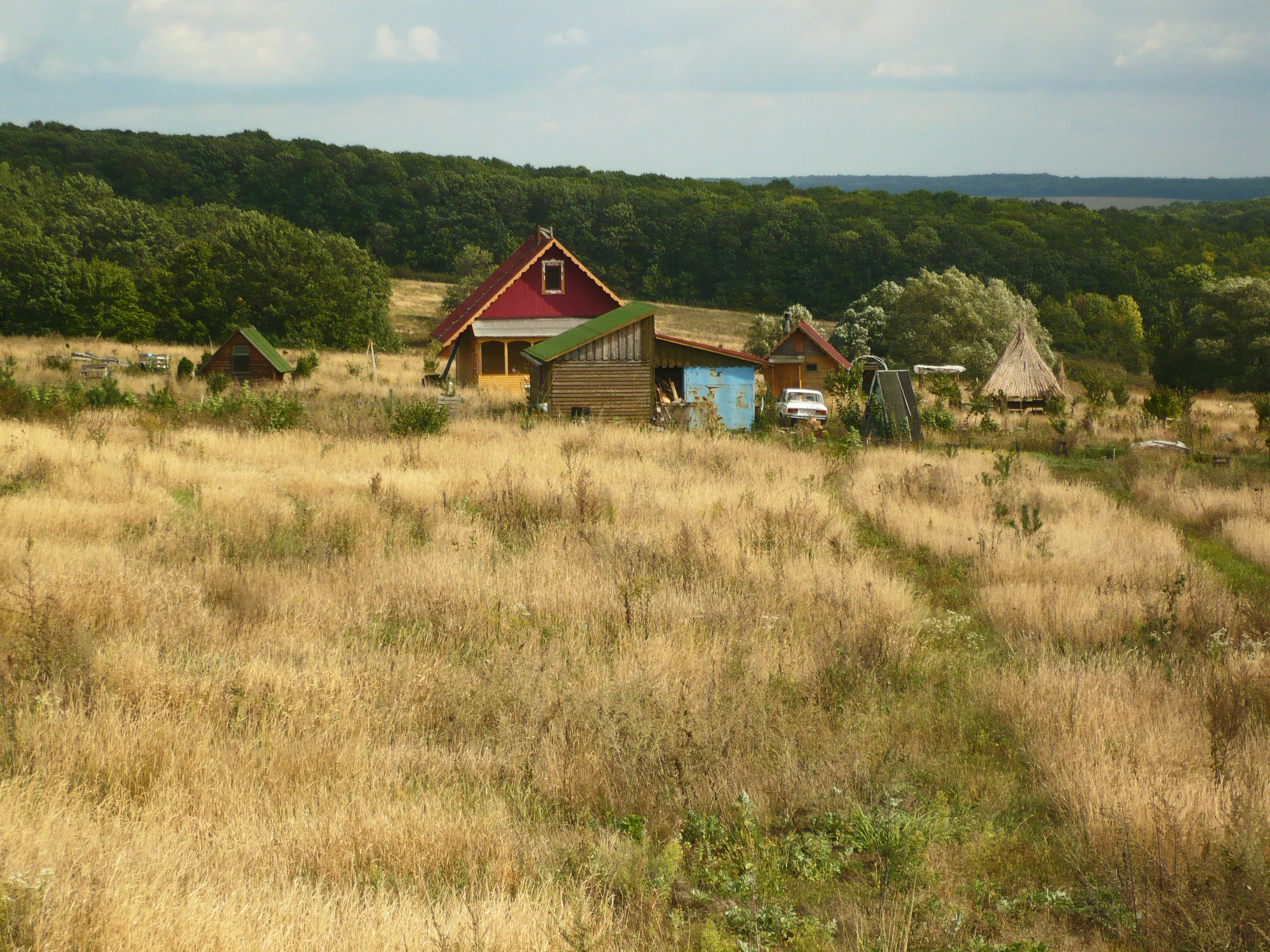
A view of some buildings of Korenskiye Rodniki ("Root Springs"), an Anastasian settlement in the Shebekinsky District, Belgorod Oblast, Russia

Anastasianism (Russian: движение «Анастасия», культ Анастасии, анастасийцы) or the Ringing Cedars (Russian: Звенящие Кедры; also known as the Jingling Cedars) falls into the category of esotericism and considers itself to be a new religious movement, often classified as New Age, that started in central Russia in 1997 and has since spread across the world. Ringing Cedars' Anastasians are sometimes categorised by scholars as part of Rodnovery (Slavic Neopaganism), and often as a modern Pagan movement of their own. The Anastasians also define their life conception as Russian Vedism (Русский Ведизм) and themselves as Vedrussians (ведруссы), and Anastasianism has therefore often been classified among the various self-styled "Vedic" religions arising in post-Soviet Russia.

The movement is based on the series of ten books entitled The Ringing Cedars of Russia written by Vladimir Megre. The knowledge contained in the books is attributed to a beautiful woman named Anastasia, a remarkable woman embodying the natural qualities of mankind without technocratic influence, who dwells in the Siberian taiga, whom Megre met during one of his trade expeditions. The books have been translated in twenty languages and have sold millions of copies. They offer a holistic worldview, teaching about humanity's relationship with nature, God and the universe, the creation of the world, the power of thought in modelling reality and the future, a cyclical eschatology, the relationship between men and women, and education. Family, tradition and environmentalism are core values for the Anastasians.

Anastasianism proposes a whole new model of social organisation, that of the "kinship homesteads", many of which constitute larger "kinship settlements". The Anastasian movement has become one of the most successful new religious movements in Russia, and from there it has then spread to other Slavic countries, broader Eastern Europe, and communities have also been established in the West. In Russia, Anastasians have faced the hostility of the Russian Orthodox Church.

== Overview ==
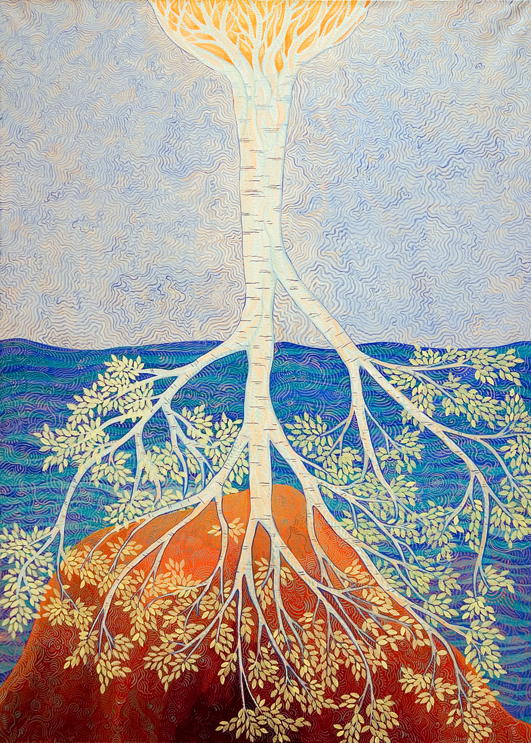
Sun Birch Tree, by the Russian artist Lola V. Lonli, 2000. In the Anastasian doctrine, God, Rod, is the eternal spiritual flow of life; its thought manifests itself as the spiral of time, of the year and the solar day, and concretely as the cycles of nature, of never-ending birth–death–rebirth. This continuous creation, or spiritual emanation, is symbolically represented by the tree of life, of which all entities are branches; the term Anastasia ("resurrection" and "incorruption") means being conscious of being eternal-living branches of the tree of the eternal spirit of God.

=== Etymology and definition ===
The two names of the movement are explainable as follows: "Anastasia" (Ἀναστασία, Anastasía), from anástasis (ἀνάστασις), is a Greek word meaning "resurrection", and "incorruption", according to the Anastasians implying the reconnection with the never-ending spiritual flow of life emanating from God, visualised as the universal tree of life of which all entities are part as branchings; "Ringing Cedars" refers to the movement's beliefs about the spiritual qualities of the Siberian cedar (Pinus sibirica), a kind of pine.

According to the Anastasians, the theme of the "singing trees" or "ringing trees", that is to say trees emitting vibrations transmitting information, is part of an ancient Eurasian and worldwide wisdom, a way of life consisting in the cultivation of Rod (Род, literally "Generator")—God conceived as continuous "Generation", "Nature"—which has been preserved over the centuries in its purest form by Russians and volkhvs (shamans) who escaped the Christianisation of Kievan Rus' fleeing to Siberia—a Christianisation which was decided by the ruling elites in order to disrupt the relational ties within society and of human society with nature, with ancestors and gods of the environment as the direct link to the supreme God, justifying the confiscation of all land and the enslavement, and exploitation through taxation and trade, of the population.

=== Academic categorisations ===
Anastasianism has been studied by scholars of religion as a new religious movement, a nature religion classified as New Age and Neopagan. The scholar Julia O. Andreeva noted that Anastasianism is a movement difficult to define because of its "blurred boundaries". Similarly, the scholars Vladimir B. Yashin and Boris I. Kostin defined it as a "soft-frame movement" fillable with elements drawn from a variety of traditions. The scholar Anna Ozhiganova observed that "the Anastasians themselves, claiming to be the successors of some ancient tradition, consider themselves to be modern Paganism", and researchers, on the other hand, view them as "a variant of the Russian New Age". Yashin and Kostin found Anastasianism to be a mutual convergence of New Age and Neopaganism, and they defined it as "one of the most successful and large-scale projects in the field of alternative spirituality in modern Russia".

Vladimir Megre's The Ringing Cedars of Russia manuals define the ideas they expound as "Vedism" and "Paganism", implying that the latter is a continuation of the former, and at the same time they explain that Paganism, and even more so Vedism, may not be defined as a "religion" but more correctly as a "culture of the way of life". Megre's books often make reference to specifically "Slavic" traditions, and most Anastasians identify the "Paganism" of Megre's books as the pre-Christian Slavic religion.

Some scholars regard Anastasianism as part of Rodnovery (Slavic Neopaganism), as both have spread through the creation of a new society of ecovillages throughout Russia (and beyond), while other scholars distinguish between the two, identifying two different ideologies underlying them: Slavic Neopaganism primarily emphasises the revival and reinvention of the ancient culture of the Slavs, while Anastasianism primarily develops within the framework of the ideas contained in Megre's books. Both the movements, however, are united in their ecological orientation, and the Anastasian movement is also defined as a wholly environmentalist movement.

Yashin and Kostin found Anastasianism to have indeed many points of contact with Slavic Neopaganism, but at the same time as being more like a "cosmopolitan Neopaganism" framework detached from any specific ethnicity and aiming at the reconstruction of universal archaic ideological concepts and life practices, including "ethnocentric Neopaganisms", that is to say the restoration of the ethnic religions of any specific ethnic group, Slavic or other. Megre's books create equal opportunities for the development and coexistence within Anastasianism of both cosmopolitan Neopaganism, Slavic Neopaganism, and other ethnic Neopaganisms. The "common denominator" that creates the prerequisite for the mutual exchange of ideas and practices between the three is "the axiological significance of family and kinship values". Andreeva has found that some Anastasians who are more focused on Slavic traditions tend to be dissatisfied with the cosmopolitan and international aspiration of the movement.

== Beliefs ==
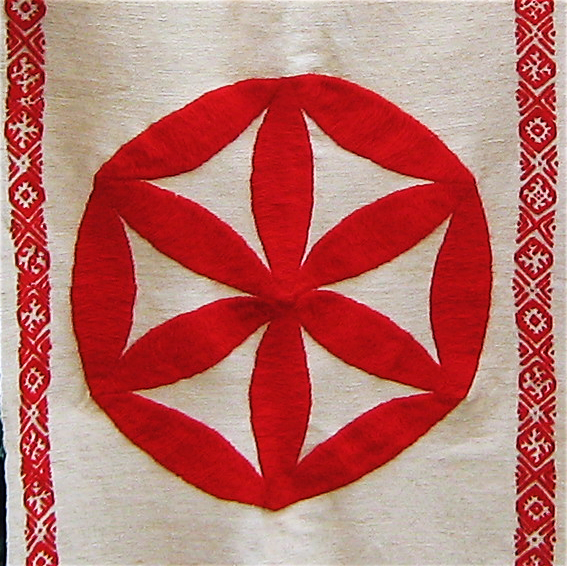
Symbol of Rod on an embroidery of the Union of Croatian Rodnovers (Savez hrvatskih rodnovjeraca). According to the Anastasians, this symbol, carved as well in traditional Russian wood carvings, represents the attunement with the cycles of the Sun, the day and the year.

The books fundamental to the Anastasian movement, deemed the "Bible" of the Russian New Age, are The Ringing Cedars of Russia written by Vladimir Megre. According to the Anastasian belief, their content was transmitted to Megre by Anastasia, a prophetess, "bearer and keeper of ancient knowledge" living in Siberia. The books do not expound doctrines in a systematic way, and are characterised by "adogmatism and variability". A book giving more clearly teachings of religious mythology is the sixth one in the series, The Book of Kin. This book expounds the history and wisdom of the "Vedrus", an ancient kin who populated Eurasia and lived in full awareness of God and harmony with the cosmos, presenting them not merely as progenitors of the modern Russians and Slavs but of the peoples of the whole world. God is Rod, i.e. continuous "Generation", "Nature", and the reconstruction of society on the basis of the "ancestral", "tribal", or "genealogical" (родовой, rodovoy) community, the central idea of the Anastasian movement, is proposed for all the peoples of the world. The seventh book The Energy of Life then defines Anastasia herself not just as a "Vedrussian", but as a "Pagan" (язычница; the Russian word is more accurately rendered as "Gentile") of the Russian Slavic tradition.

Regarding the ancient Vedrus and their descendants, Anastasia, in The Book of Kin (p. 93), says:

Quite recently, just five thousand years ago, our people were still happily awake in the real world in the territory from the Mediterranean and Black Sea to the extreme northern latitudes [...] We are Asians, Europeans, Russians and even those who recently called themselves Americans, are, in fact, people-gods from the same Vedrussian civilisation. There was a period of life on our planet that is called Vedic.

Then, in The Energy of Life (p. 136) Megre says:

Your distant, very distant ancestral mother was Pagan. She loved and understood nature. She knew the Universe and the meaning of the rising Sun. [...] They were Pagans, they could understand God's thought through its nature. Your distant, very distant ancestral mother and father knew how to make you happy. They knew because they were Pagans.

Yashin and Kostin defined Anastasianism as a "kind of puzzle" of communities of which it is "impossible to form a holistic picture", given that, despite being undergirded by the shared framework represented by Megre's books, each community develops its own varying beliefs. Studying the beliefs of the Anastasian community Inberen ("Ginger"), in Sargatsky District, Omsk Oblast, the oldest and largest Anastasian settlement in Russia, they found that the members, apart from Megre's books, drew religious beliefs from the doctrines of a variety of Rodnover organisations and authors, from Aleksandr Khinevich's Ynglism, from Roerichism, and even from Orthodox Christian and Tibetan Buddhist sources.

=== Theology and cosmology ===
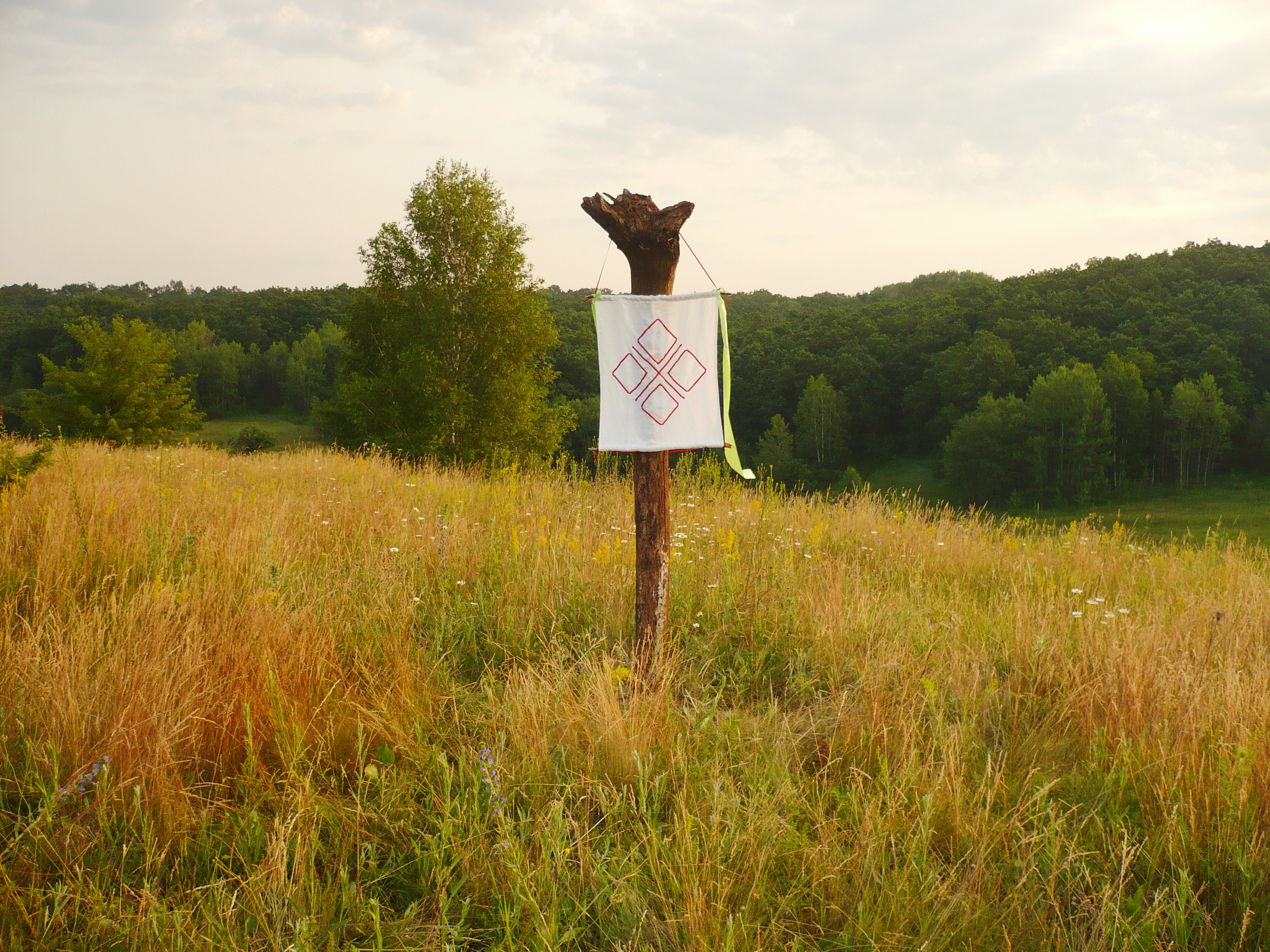
Stump with a hanging cloth with embroidered the Rodnover symbol of the earthly mother goddess Mokosh at an Anastasian settlement

==== God and the gods ====
Anastasianism may be described as a nature religion, since Anastasian spirituality emphasises the sacredness of nature or generation, conceived as manifested divinity and as the means of communication with the supreme God (Rod); the scholar Rasa Pranskevičiūtė characterised this vision as pantheistic, and noted how it is a fundamental influence in Anastasians' social project. They stress the importance of harmony, that is to say giving and receiving love and respect, appropriate reciprocal cultivation, good thought and good word, between individual and between the community of individuals and the divinity of all nature, since nature is the manifestation of God, and it reads, and is actively shaped, by the thought and word of humans.

A Lithuanian Anastasian defined God as follows:

God is Nature—a twitter of birds, the wind, a rustle of trees... everything that is in Nature is the living book of sensual information, and much more: he touches us through Nature.

God is an energetic entity, and everything is born of its essence. Anastasians believe that nature is the "materialised thought of God", or the expression of the "divine power of God". All living things, and superior living beings or gods, are believed to be thoughts of God, and therefore by communicating with them humanity may communicate with God. The "divine thought" or "divine design" is reflected in the eternal cycle of birth, growth, maturity, death and rebirth, as well as in the cycle of the day and the seasons of the year; God is the spiral of time expressing itself in physical (natural) cycles, it is the year itself, and the "Kingdom of God" is not a transcendent dimension or an afterlife but is immanent and attainable in the physical dimension, "Heaven on Earth" is attainable in the "here and now".

According to the words of another Anastasian:

A very important thing, according to Anastasia, is that Nature materialises thanks to the thoughts of God. God invented grass, trees and animals. These are the thoughts of God, and through communication with them, we communicate with God. And this is not an esoteric position. [...] Thoughts are read with great attention by a person with good imagination. [...] In this way there is an opportunity to speak with God.

In Anastasian doctrines, the supreme God expresses itself as many gods or deities, who are "more or less concentrated energy clots in space", and influence the world on the energetic plane, and in turn the conscience of supreme God is the "unified conscience of all living creatures". God and the many gods are generally held to be impersonal and are not regarded as objects of worship. Megre's books also recognise the existences of "dark forces" associated with the Earth, which emerged when God created it as opposites of his action. These dark forces were used by the priests who invented the global religions and the modern technocratic system in order to subjugate the consciousness of mankind, hampering men's direct communication with God and projecting instead their consciousness towards the worship of the priests and of the dark forces themselves.

==== Anastasia and the ringing cedars ====
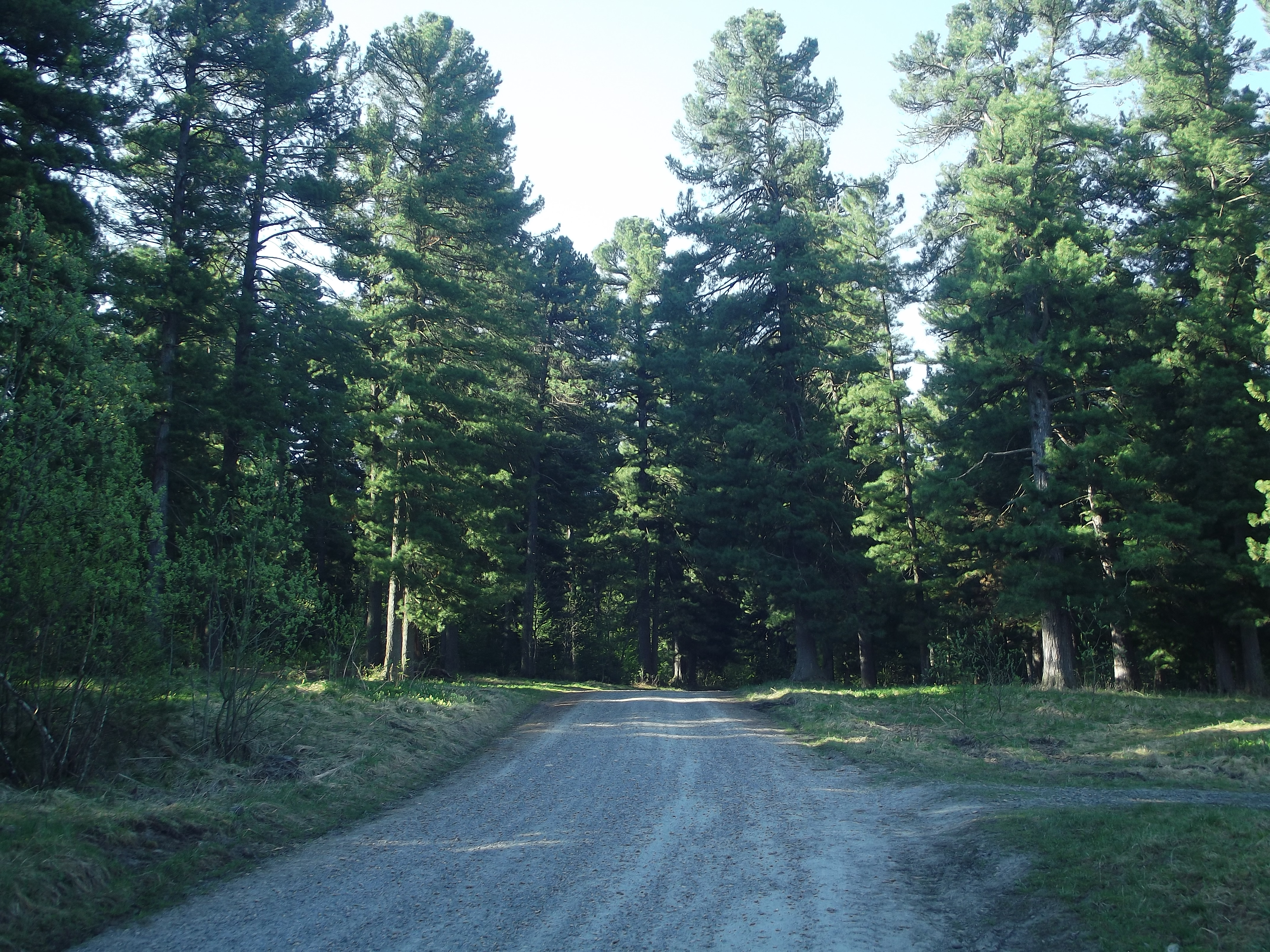
Forest of Siberian cedars near the village of Plotnikovsky, in Tomsky District, Tomsk Oblast

Some Anastasians consider Anastasia a deity, or the incarnation of a deity, while some others regard her as the archetype of the perfected human being. According to the books written by Vladimir Megre, she received the knowledge reported in the books themselves directly from the supreme God, through the ancestors. Megre describes her as a prophetess with various spiritual abilities, as being able to understand all the languages of the world, as being aware by intuitive knowledge of all what happens in the urban world, and as having the appearance of the typical "Russian beauty", with "golden hair" and "smooth skin". Anastasia would be living in the Siberian taiga as a hermit, and, according to the books, her role would be to instruct humanity about the righteous way of living. She, or her divine form, would have been known by different names in different cultures, for example as Persephone in ancient Greece. However, Megre emphasises that Anastasia is a human, and she would have given birth to a son and a daughter from him, named Vladimir and Anasta, who would be living with their mother in Siberia and would have spiritual abilities like her. The scholar Anna Ozhiganova reported to have "never met" any Anastasian doubting that Anastasia truly exists as a woman living in the Siberian forests, but that many consider Megre's works to be an imperfect version of Anastasia's original teachings. Anastasia, especially in her name meaning "resurrection", is also seen as personifying the tree of life, representing the never-ending spiritual flow of life emanated by God of which all entities, and men themselves, are part, the kins representing the branches of this never-ending whole; it also implies that in truth there is no eternal death, but eternal life and rebirth.

The theme of the "ringing trees" is central to the Anastasian system of beliefs, and the ringing trees are identified as those of the Siberian cedar (Pinus sibirica) species. According to the first of Megre's books, Anastasia:

God created the Cedar as an accumulator of the energies of the Cosmos. [...] The cedar receives the energy emanating from a person through the Cosmos, stores it and gives it back at the right time.

Anastasians believe that cedars which "ring" are those that during a lifetime of about five hundred and fifty years accumulated and never dispersed a great amount of energy. When they reach this age, they emit a barely audible ringing to give a sign to humans to take them, cut them down and use their energy for the benefit of the Earth. According to Megre's books, if the ringing cedars are not cut down within three years, they stop ringing and they begin to burn internally from the accumulated energy, dying painfully over the course of years. For this reason, the Anastasians try to find and save the ringing cedars. It is also believed that under the canopy of any cedar is good to practise meditation and easy to receive divine revelations.

=== Eschatology ===
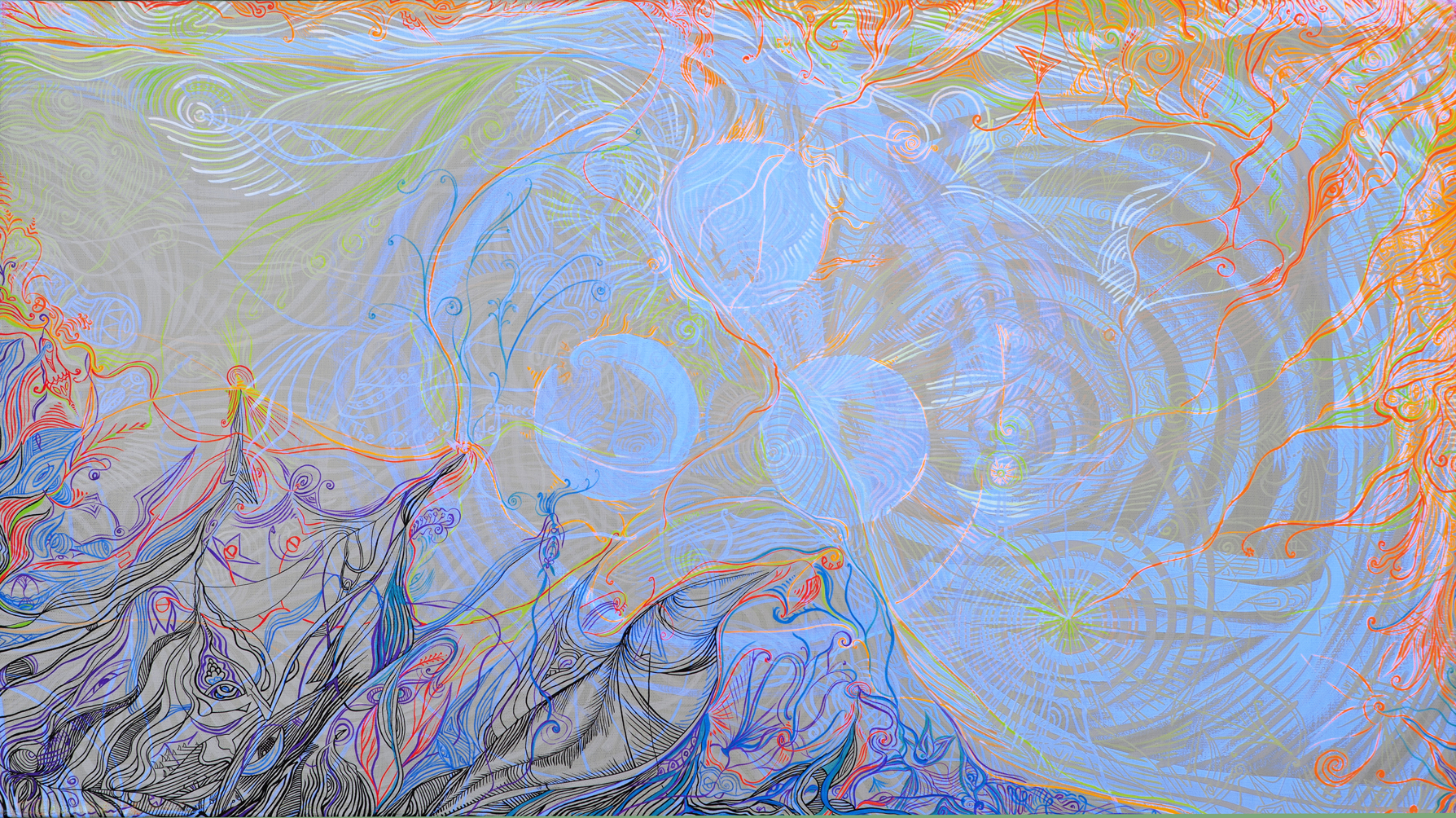
Different Spaces. White. UV, by Lola V. Lonli, 2012.

Anastasian doctrines about the crisis and degeneration of modern civilisation are inspired by thinkers of the Traditionalist School, such as René Guénon. In the Ringing Cedars' books, Anastasia teaches a cyclical eschatology, according to which time develops through three phases: a "Vedic" (of vision) period when humanity lives in harmony with Heaven; an "Imagic" (of image) period when knowledge starts to be codified and concentrates in the hands of progressively fewer holy men; and an "Occultic" (of hiding) period in which knowledge is totally "hidden" and humanity's consciousness severely downgrades.

The Vedic "Golden Age" lasted 990 thousand years, during which humanity directly possessed the awareness of God and lived in perfect harmony with the universe, and the bearers of righteousness and of the highest wisdom were the Vedrus, who populated an area spanning from the lands near the North Pole to the Mediterranean Sea. Then came the Imagic era, lasting nine thousand years, when the highest knowledge was no longer directly perceived and was therefore codified into figurative means and transmitted by castes of priests who reincarnated over the generations.

The Occultic era, lasting just one thousand years, is the current epoch in which the highest knowledge has become completely hidden, "occult", and humanity has degenerated and is prey to dark forces. According to Anastasian doctrines, the last descendants of the Vedrus inhabited the territory of modern-day Russia, and they are about to start a new disclosure of the original Vedic wisdom. Anastasians believe that they are at the forefront of the rebirth of a Golden Age, and their appeal to go "back to nature" implies to go back to the original awareness of God and to reawaken the connection with the ancestors. These ideas are expressed in Ringing Cedars' books as follows:

When we find our inner charms, how to awake our inner ancestors [...] we are born as young gods.

The Anastasians believe that with their practices of good childbirth, good education and good living, they are giving rise to a "new mankind" (нового человека, novogo cheloveka), harmonious and perfect, which will overcome the decadent existing civilisation.

=== Love space and reincarnation ===
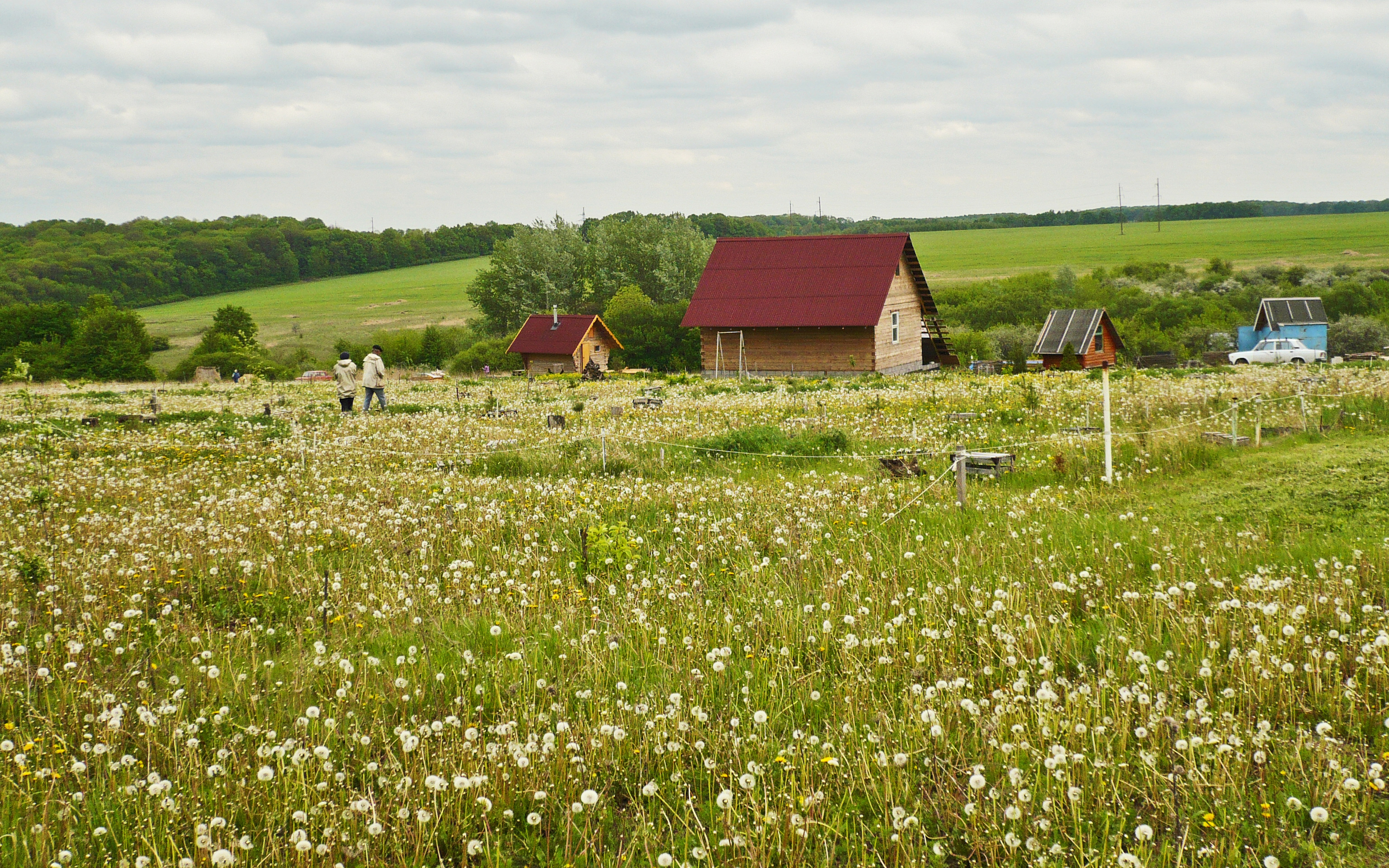
Dandelion fields and andulin-roofed house and bathhouse in the Anastasian settlement of Korenskiye Rodniki

According to Megre, when a man lives in harmony with his own kin a "love space" (пространство любви, prostranstvo lyubvi) is established as a field where God is present, immanent, and which constitutes a "Heaven on Earth", where kindred people grow together with the surrounding world; it is not merely a geographic concept—the actual "ancestral homestead" (родовое поместье, rodovoye pomest'ye), the land of at least one hectare in size owned and inhabited by the kin— but it is first of all the web of relationships between kindred people and includes any good creation of the spirit of mankind.

The "love space" mirrors the modality of God's work through nature; God is "dissolved" in nature and each "love space" is a parcel of God. In the kinship homestead, the concretisation of the "love space", a man is capable of building a house with natural materials, growing plants and domesticating animals, creating an ecosystem. As such it is perceived as a holy land, a microcosm reflecting the macrocosm, wherein individuals may "co-create" with kindred people and with God. According to Anastasians' own experiences reported by Julia O. Andreeva and Rasa Pranskevičiūtė, the new social organisation represented by the kinship homesteads helps people to leave the unnatural and decaying urban technocratic system, which they conceive as a close system which smothers human creativity ensnaring it in meaningless behaviours.

A Russian Anastasian described her experience of the kinship homestead as follows:

[It is] a way to open your inner potential—it is the place where every person can open his inner potential to the maximum—in other words, to live in accordance with the programs which have been put by God. [...] Through Nature you can gain insight into God's purpose.

In the Anastasian movement the family or extended kin (rod) is conceived as an entity, embodied as the "love space" and its ancestral homestead, whose aim is the projection of itself in the future as a lineage of descendants of its original progenitors. A kin may be constituted by people already related by blood, or by like-minded people who come together to create a new web of blood relations. The "love space" is always a both transcendent and immanent space, where an individual may be reborn: the Anastasians believe in reincarnation, that it may be consciously planned, and that it mainly occurs within the kinship lineage and its spatial dimension because all reality and humans themselves are energy of thought, and therefore ancestors may reincarnate in the same lineage that they produced if they are remembered, thought and loved by their descendants. The soul constantly returns to its living relatives in the "love space"; as the latter is a parcel of God, the soul always returns to its divine source, to its "paradise" (рай, ray), in both transcendent and immanent terms.

== Ethics and practices ==
=== Anthropological values ===
The Anastasians believe in the interconnectedness of all being, and therefore they greatly emphasise the moral responsibility of individuals and humanity towards the surrounding world; they believe that human thoughts and feelings actively, magically influence the surrounding world, having the power to affirm or disrupt natural harmony. The surrounding reality is actively shaped by human thought and speech, which is read and realised by the universal mind; therefore it is important that humans have good thoughts and good speech, avoiding any negative and destructive word. Pranskevičiūtė reports the following excerpt from Megre's first book, Anastasia:

Radiation emanates from a person in a state of love. That energy of radiance reflects into the planets above him in a short particle of a second, comes back to Earth again and gives life to everything that is alive. [...] Dark radiation emanates from a person who is in a state of evil feelings. Dark radiation cannot go up and gets into the depths of the Earth. Reflected from the bowels, it returns to the surface in the form of volcanic eruptions, earthquakes, wars.

In order to be respectful towards other forms of life, Anastasians try to eschew any form of killing, and therefore they adopt vegetarian, vegan, and sometimes raw food diets, and wear clothes made of natural materials. In the Anastasan settlement Blagodati ("Grace") in Pereslavl-Zalessky, Yaroslavl Oblast of Russia, studied by Anna Ozhiganova in 2015, the overwhelming majority of the settlers were vegetarian (though some ate eggs laid by their own chickens), and some of them practised a raw food diet. The scholar Artemy A. Pozanenko, in the settlements that he studies, found that while almost all Anastasians were vegetarian, believing that meat is extremely harmful to the body, only a few practised a raw food diet, and some supplemented their diet with eggs, milk and fish. They also abhorred smoking and the consumption of alcoholic drinks.

The Anastasians also propose "traditional" values antagonistic towards the "wrong" values of modern Western lifestyle; they "do not want to compromise on specific questions like gender equality and capitalist economy". Anastasians believe that males and females are naturally different and should be raised according to their different natural roles: the former should be taught how to build the house, the stove, the shed, and so on; the latter should be taught how to create a harmonious family environment, how to know herbs and to heal.

=== Childbirth, health and education ===
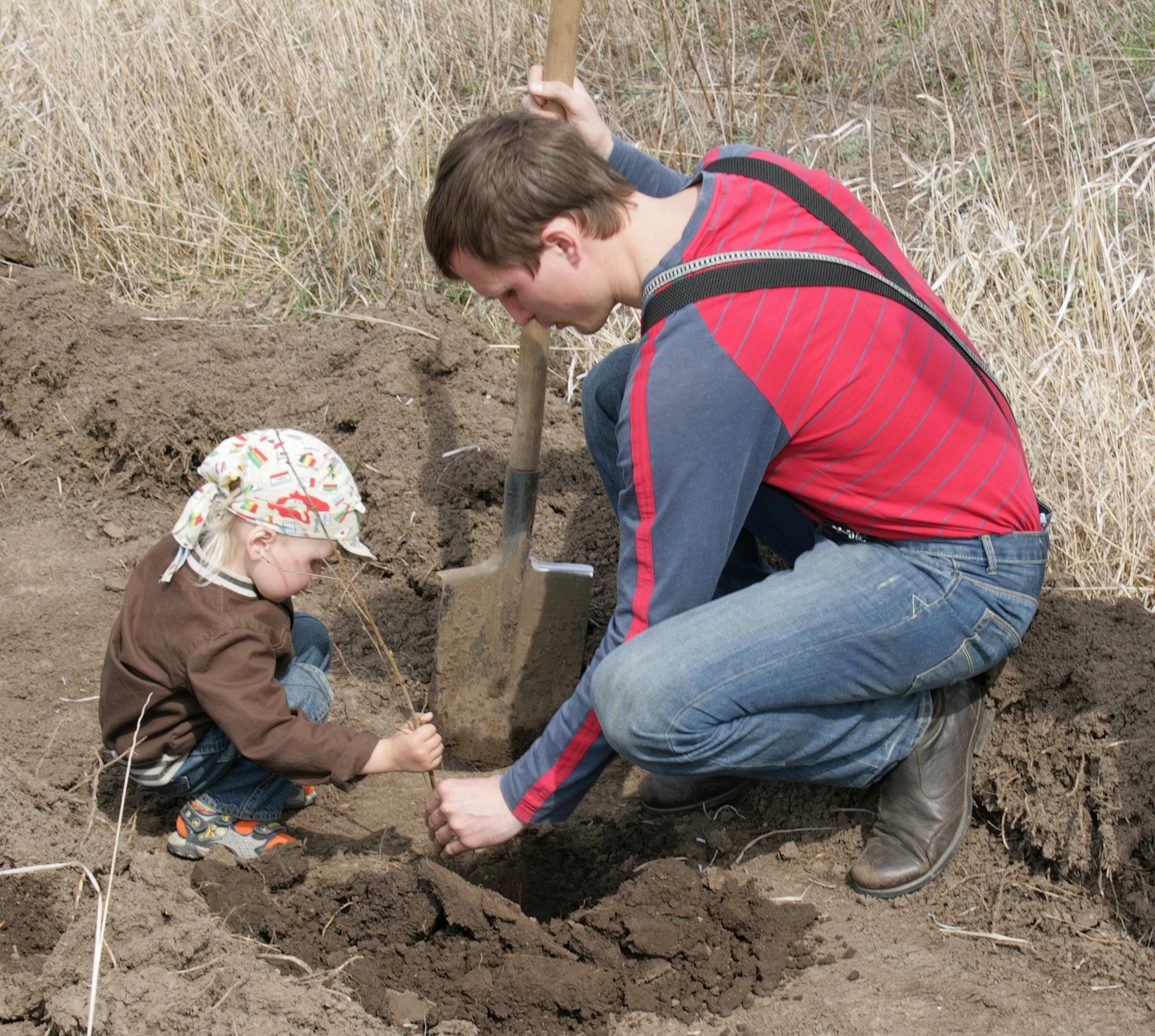
A child is taught to plant a sapling at the Anastasian event "Green Action" in 2012.

As the aim of the kin is its own perpetuation as a lineage into the future, the cultivation of the offspring, the raising of children, takes a great importance in Anastasianism, as it is the success or failure in raising children that determines the future of the kin and the broader community. Megre's books, Anastasia's teachings, contain a lot of instructions on how to raise children: a child is a perfect man, and the most perfect being in the universe, pure and blameless, who in the first nine years of existence is capable of "independently cognise the essence of the universe and the meaning of human existence, having the potential to become a wiseman, a deity in connection with the supreme God.

For achieving this goal, it is necessary that the child is raised in an ancestral homestead and in the natural environment, not surrounded by artificial objects and toys; the attention of the child should be occupied with natural activities such as raking up hay, playing with animals, planting seeds and saplings, and not distracted with "meaningless and even harmful communication with man-made objects". As every animal and every blade of grass is in connection with the universe, they help the child to "realise the essence of the universe and of himself within it". The parents should also upbring children with good attitudes and exposing them to good thoughts. Children are a frequent subject featured in Anastasian works of art, where they are represented in the kinship homestead doing natural activities, often representing specific quotes from Megre's books.

Anastasians pay great attention to health, and especially to the health of children, often rejecting the treatments of modern medicine, as Anastasian anthropology conceives man as an integral entity, existing only as an inextricable interconnection of the spiritual and the physical. In this vein, many Anastasians practise home birth or birth at sea, body hardening, herbal medicine, treatment with honey and bee products, and refuse vaccines and drugs. Natural childbirth is emphasised, and well explained in Megre's books even with the description of the childbirth rite of the ancient Vedrus, while medical support in childbirth is completely rejected as the "main crime of civilisation against humanity", as "it is a vivid illustration of the loss of ability in women of the generative instinct, and the loss in modern people of the knowledge not only of the primary sources, but also of the elementary culture of feelings". The reasons for Anastasians' refusal of medical treatments for illness and childbirth are primarily esoteric, as they believe that medical intervention violates the integrity of the body and the spiritual essence of the human being.

The education of children should contribute, first of all, to the development of the speed of thought, through a system of questions and independently found answers, and then it should be vocational as among the ancient Vedrus, and knowledge should also be transmitted from generation to generation during the major holidays, viewed as moments of "information exchange". As the ideal school model, Megre proposes that of the "ancestral school" (родовой школой, rodovoy shkoloy) first established in 1994 in Tekos, Krasnodar Krai, by Mikhail Shchetinin, which follows the same ideal of a vocational education held in natural settings and through a direct involvement with the works of nature. Many Anastasian settlements have established their own schools. Ozhiganova compared the educational ideal of the Anastasians to that of the primitivists, especially Jean-Jacques Rousseau who in Emile, or On Education criticised urban life as "an abyss for the human race" where "races perish or degenerate over time" and advocated a renewal through the return to village life and natural education. The Anastasians believe that modern urban life is a system that binds people in unnatural ways of conduct, that it is "a structure that works by itself and distracts a person from nature".

=== Rituals, pilgrimages and calendars ===
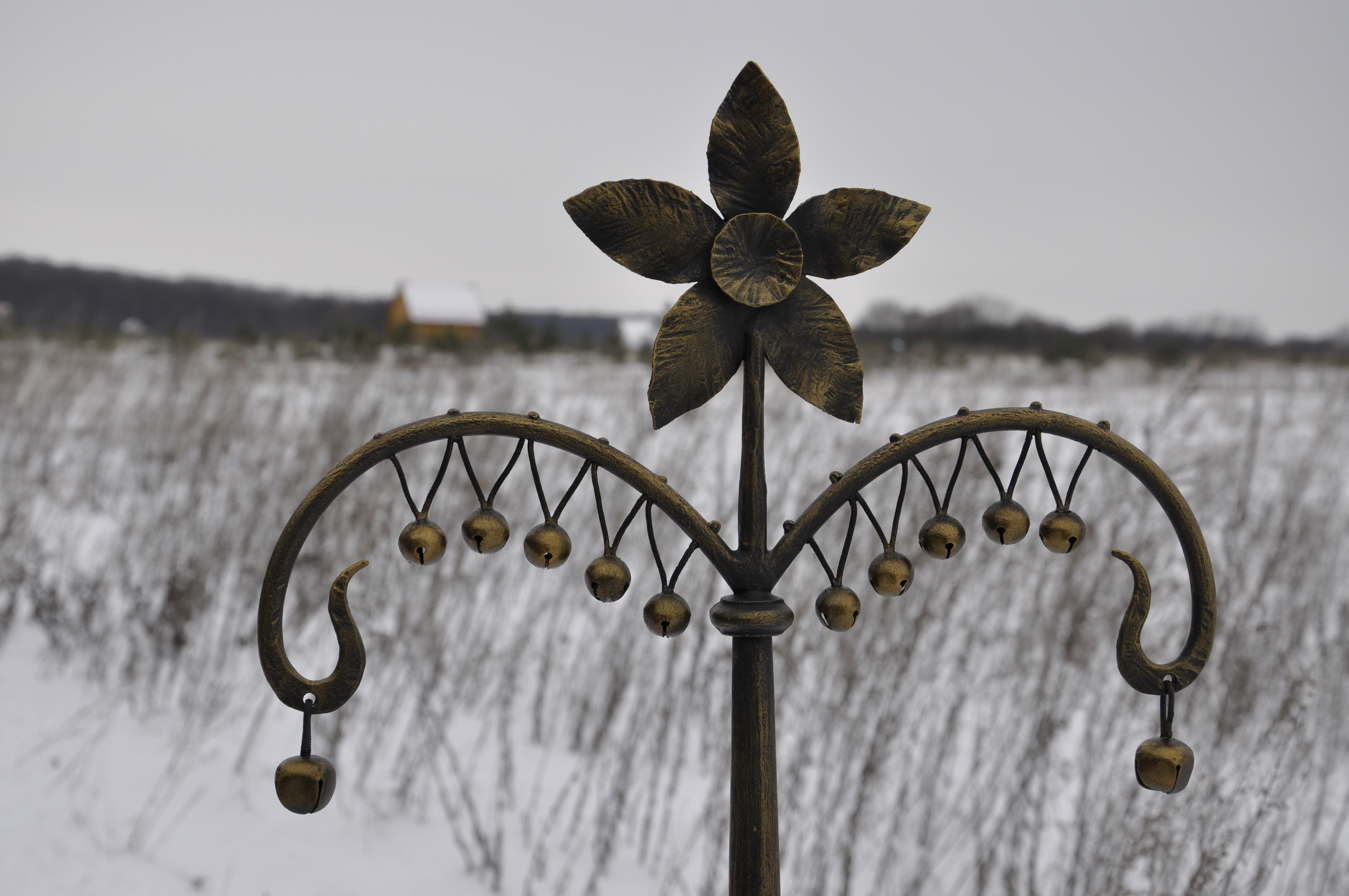
A staff with a flower ornament and bells used for the festival of Koliada in Korenskiye Rodniki

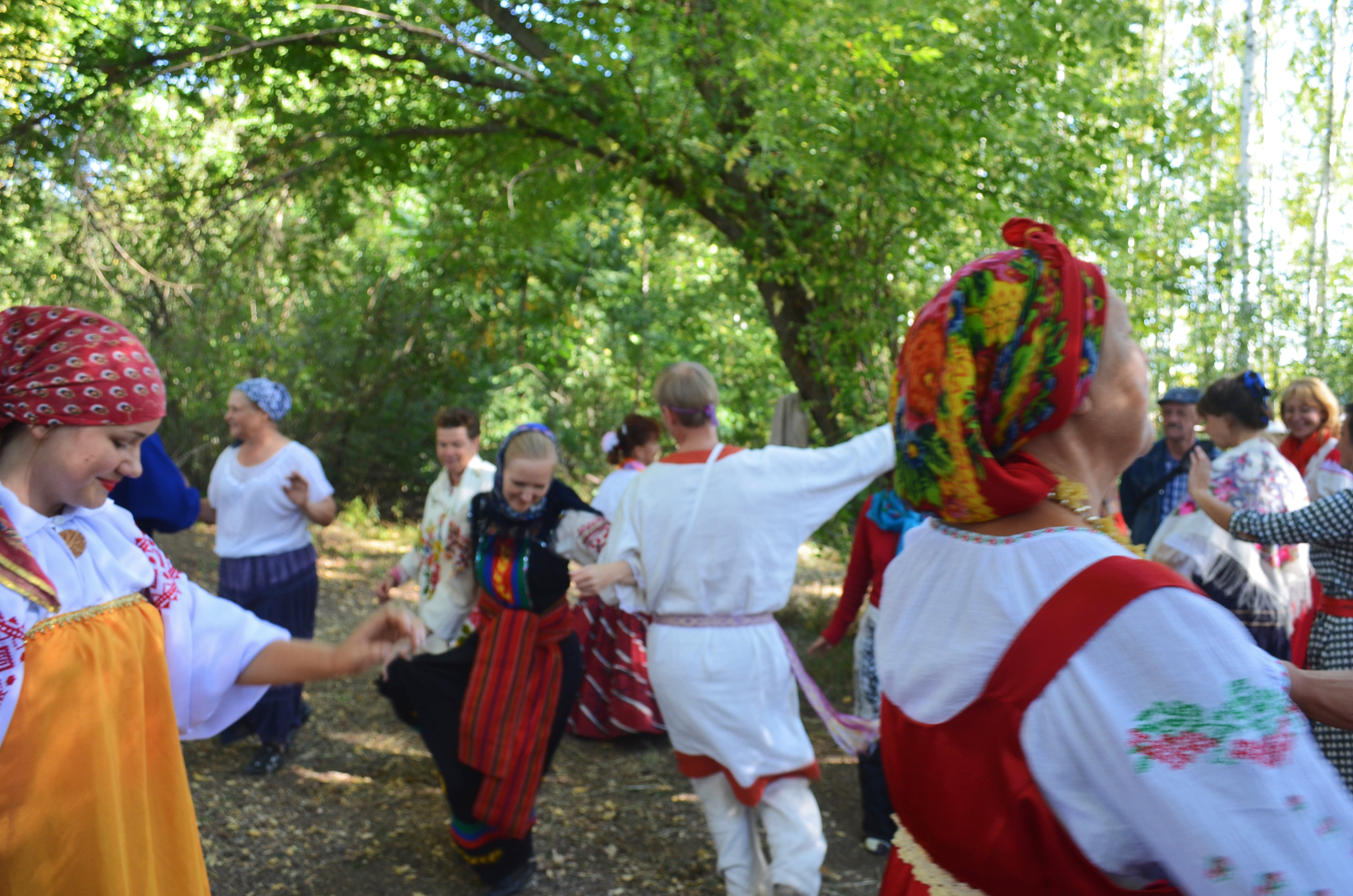
Anastasians performing dances on the autumnal festival of Osenins

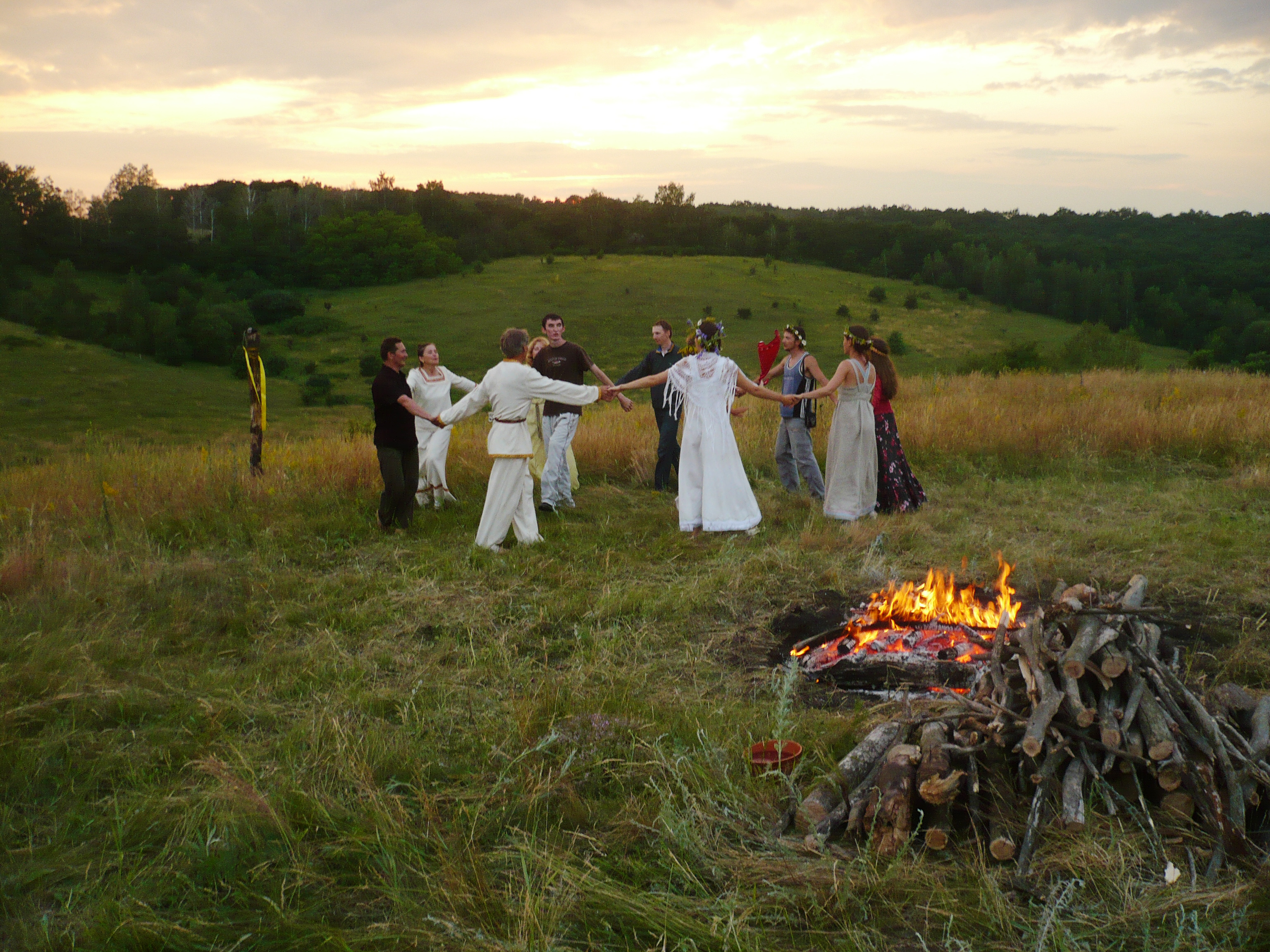
Anastasians practising a khorovod, circle-dance, near a bonfire, for the festival of Kupala Night

Anastasians engage in communal ceremonies and individual rituals and folk traditions, which are deemed "an obligatory component of a full life", necessary to integrate the "isolated modern man". Rituals for the sacralisation of the "love spaces" are crucial for most believers, a sacralisation which means making the "love space" a place where nature, the thought of God, is ideally free to unfold itself. Various ritual activities are aimed at awakening the "ancestral memory" and the channels of reincarnation; they may include meditation, singing songs and playing musical instruments, composing and reciting poems, and dancing in circle. Rituals of purification, performed in preparation for the holidays and the connection with the ancestors, may include bathing in icy water and then jumping three times over a bonfire, as well as walking on hot coals.

It is imperative that when a kinship homestead or larger settlement is established, rituals have to be developed within its tradition. An Anastasian, founder of a folklore society, found that such imperative arises spontaneously in the settlers as they recover their "ancestral memory":

You see, people living in a settlement, in an ecological settlement, that is, having settled on the earth, suddenly feel that it is necessary. Games, dances, songs—they need them! The ancestral memory wakes up and demands them.

The books of Vladimir Megre make reference to various ancient traditions defined as "pre-Russian Revolution", "pre-Christian Slavic", and "Vedrussian". These practices, according to the Anastasians, have not necessarily to be reconstructed ancient practices, but they may be innovated or invented as what is really important is that they are not performed thoughtlessly and mechanically as an empty form, but that they are invested with meaning, with semantic value. The meaning of the tradition is precisely to do things as if they were done "for the first time", as the "first actions". Andreeva defines Anastasian traditionalism as one who "accepts innovations and adapts to the surrounding reality" as traditions have to be a "means of self-realisation". Besides Megre's books, Anastasians draw from a variety of sources and authors, including B. A. Rybakov, V. Y. Propp, V. A. Chudinov, S. V. Zharni.

Anastasians also organise pilgrimages to various sites that they consider to be holy, where they believe they may communicate with the ancestors and with God through meditation. These "places of power" are considered places of origin of the ancestors of more or less all modern kins; the spirits of the ancestors are believed to reside in these places, their "paradises". Sites important to Russian Anastasians include megalithic buildings like the dolmens of the North Caucasus, and sites on the Black Sea coast, especially Gelendzhik in Krasnodar Krai, and other places like Gelendzhik characterised by Siberian cedar groves. Lithuanian Anastasians make pilgrimage to a holy site in Tverai.

In Anastasianism, a man is believed to form only as the result of a series of "rites of creation" (обрядов сотворения, obryadov sotvoreniya), or of initiation, of which in the Vedrussian tradition, according to Megre's books, great importance is given to the "rites of love" (обрядам любви, obryadam lyubvi), which include "matchmaking", "wedding", the "creation of the three planes of existence", and the "ancestral rites". According to Anastasian teachings a person is born in the "three planes of existence", coalescing into the "love space", that is the kinship homestead: the first plane is the mind of the parents, where two loves merge into one; the second plane is the astral one, the outer space, where a new star is lit up once the parents unite their bodies; the third plane is the physical one, where the child is physically born.

Ritual activities are often performed at major holidays throughout the year. The calendar of an Anastasian community may be organised according to the cosmic days of the traditional Slavic calendar, or according to the needs of the given community itself. The solstices and the equinoxes are celebrated by all Anastasians. Some Anastasians even celebrate Christian holidays, chiefly Christmas, and secular national holidays. Some holidays are distinctively Anastasian and taken from Megre's books, such as the celebration of the "Earth Day" on 23 July with rituals under the cedars. Holidays and rituals are deemed important to maintain social order and stability, to connect with the cycle of time, to connect with the family and the ancestors, as well as for finding new friends and marriage partners among like-minded people. Anastasians believe that the holy times are the best moment to gather like-minded people and to find whether people are suitable for each other or not, and they believe that this is a practice which goes back to the ancient "Golden Age".

== Organisation ==
The "Anastasia Foundation for Supporting Culture and Creativity" (Владимирский фонд поддержки культуры и творчества «Анастасия») is a non-commercial organisation, a private foundation established in the city of Vladimir by Vladimir Megre. It functions as an information and coordination center of the Ringing Cedars' movement. "LLC Megre" is, otherwise, a commercial organisation that produces cedar oil and other products under the brand name "Ringing Cedars of Russia".

Anastasianism does not have a rigid structure, centralised organisation, hierarchy or authoritarian leaders, fixed membership and fees. Anastasians believe in "self-government", which is not a "pyramid of power" but rather is "the presence of God and the divine laws in action [...] reliance on the Spirit". Independent associations of like-minded people arise situationally and spontaneously as clubs of readers of Megre's books in the cities, for instance to discuss the books, hold seminars, attend concerts, find common solutions to problems; beginning from there, some then decide to establish ancestral settlements in the countrysides. The participants of the movement themselves, based on the ideas of the books, are encouraged to develop applied ideological and organisational materials on their own.

=== Kinship homesteads and settlements ===
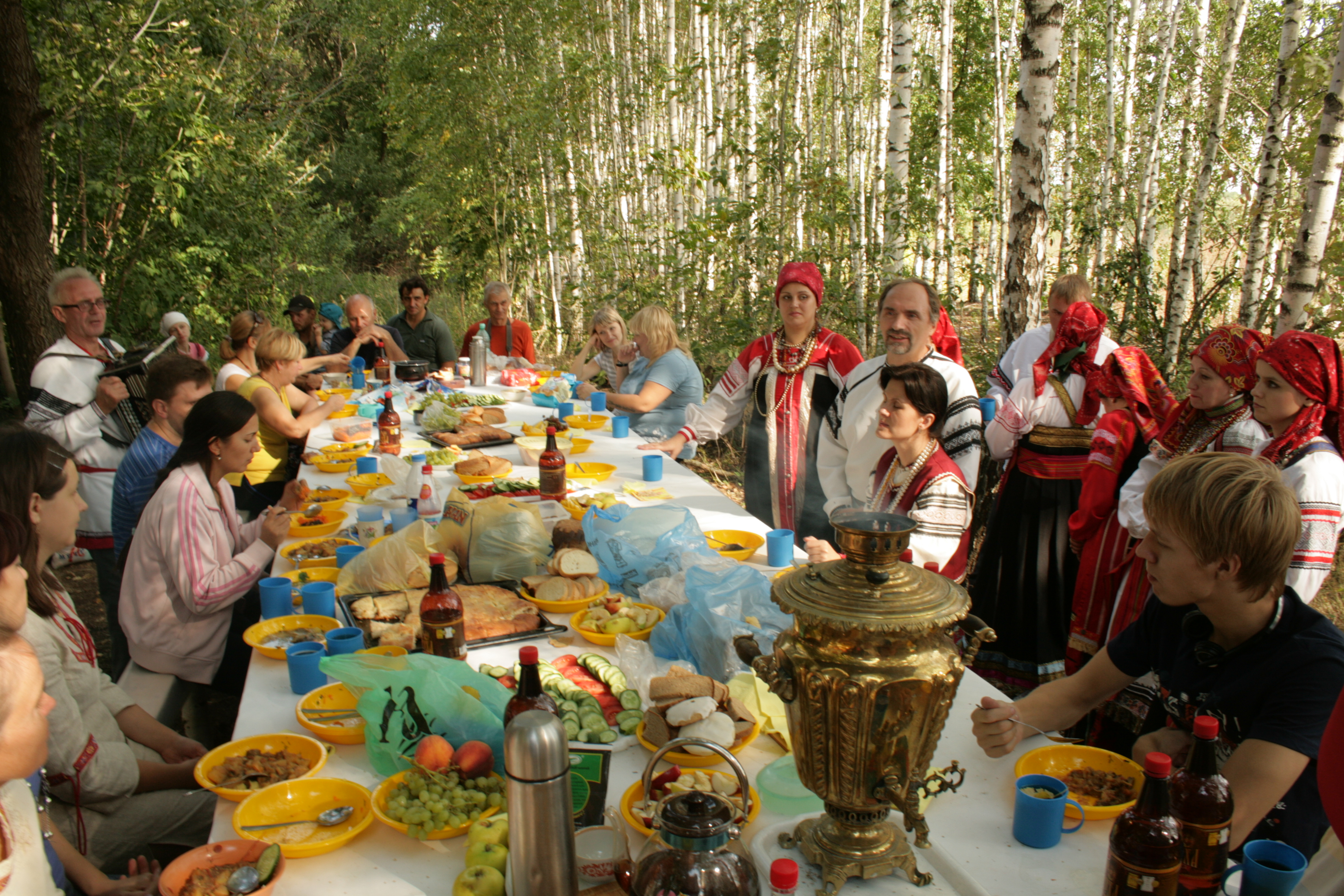
Banquet for the opening of a new ancestral homestead within a broader ancestral settlement

The social ideal of the Anastasian movement, upon which all its organisation relies, is the kinship homestead, or ancestral estate (родовое поместье, rodovoye pomest'ye) consisting of a parcel of land of approximately one hectare owned by one family, where the family's members and their descendants can live without having to rely on modern urban civilisation. The kinship homestead is owned by a kin, a family, and is handed down from generation to generation. The model of the kinship homestead is believed to be a reproduction of the universe's working, or God's working. It is the actualised "love space", conceived as an "ideal form of organising the existence of the human race", a microcosm which unites man to nature, to the God of the universe, where the relations between kindred people and between the kin and the universe open up.

The official website of the Anastasian Foundation gives the following definition of the kinship homestead:

The kinship homestead is a parcel of land of not less than one hectare (100×100m) for the permanent residence of one family, where the family can build a house with love, plant a family tree, own a forest, a garden, and equip a pond. The kinship homestead is enclosed by a hedge of forest cultures: cedar, coniferous and deciduous trees, shrubs.

The desired place for living is chosen individually in nature, and a "love space" is established on it as the kinship homestead, opening "Heaven on Earth". Many kinship homesteads of one hectare of land may constitute larger kinship settlements (родовое поселение, rodovoye poseleniye), or ecovillages, such as Inberen in Sargatsky District, Omsk Oblast, the oldest and largest Anastasian settlement in Russia which was founded in 2002 and as of 2018 comprised 130 hectares of land distributed as many kinship homesteads.

The fundamental structures that have to be present on the land of an ancestral homestead are a house built with good thoughts, and a garden with trees (Siberian cedars are planted in large numbers in Anastasian homesteads); in such location a family may begin to develop itself. As in the case of the settlement of Inberen, Anastasian settlements may have a "common house" (общий дом, obshchiy dom), a two-storeied building at the centre of the settlement which is shared by all the settlers and is used to hold regular assemblies and to organise the shared ceremonies of the community, such as an annual gathering known as the "renewal", when one participant tells the story of what happened in the settlement during the year. Other common areas may be springs, baths, garages, and there may be shared equipments, such as tractors.

The scholar Julia O. Andreeva observed that there tend to be two types of Anastasian settlement: Anastasian settlements that emphasise the construction of a single community with land property shared among all members, often inspired by communist ideas; and Anastasian settlements that emphasise kinship homesteads as private properties of families, and their transfer by inheritance, and usually put less focus on the building of the larger community. Megre's books, though inconsistent in their instructions about the theme, emphasise that the kinship homestead should be a land owned by the family, to be transmitted by inheritance to the descendants. Some settlements allocate smaller plots for individual property and bigger plots for running a common economy and infrastructure. To avoid that neighbours might sell their land to outsiders of the settlement who might build industrial and commercial activities on it, some Anastasian settlements adopting the second model have implemented forms of social contract providing a number of mutual obligations. In general, the model emphasising the community over the single kinship homesteads has been observed as being more successful, since "the neighbours are thought primarily as like-minded people and comrades in building a new world, so that by joint effort it is possible to organise a full-fledged infrastructure, for example to install electricity, build roads, and a school".

Access of newcomers to an Anastasian settlement generally requires acquaintance with Megre's books and support for their philosophy. Usually, it is necessary to fill out a questionary and to write a short essay, and to present oneself to a general meeting or to a board of members responsible for recruiting newcomers, where a decision is made whether to welcome the applicant or not. Some settlements have loose rules for selecting newcomers, while in other settlements very strict requirements are imposed to newcomers: preference is given to young families with children or to people who guarantee that after a short period they will move to the settlement for permanent residence (though compromises are possible, for instance for men who work in the cities and come to their family only on the weekend).

=== Economy and communication ===
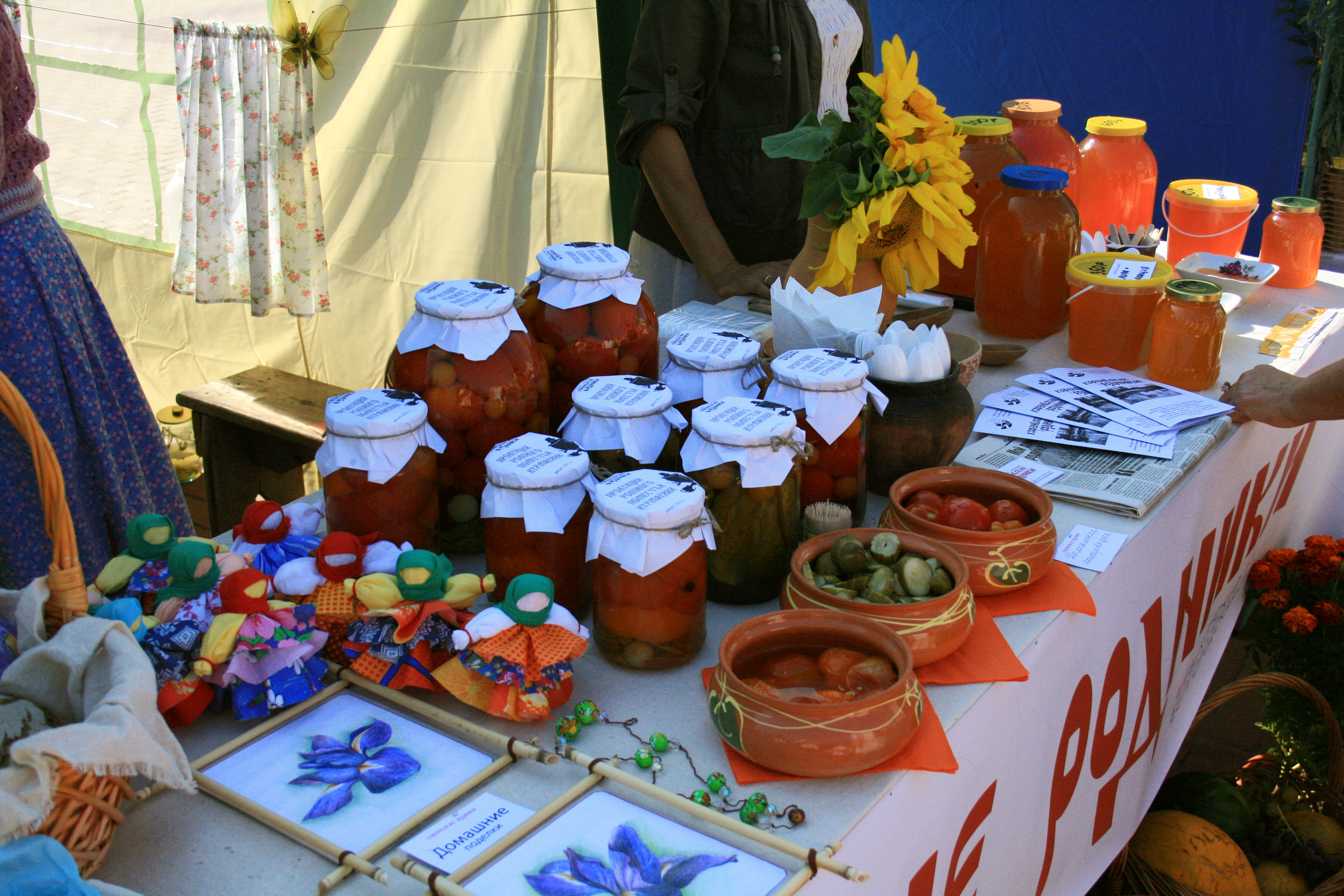
Stand in Belgorod for selling a variety of economic products of the Anastasian settlement Korenskiye Rodniki

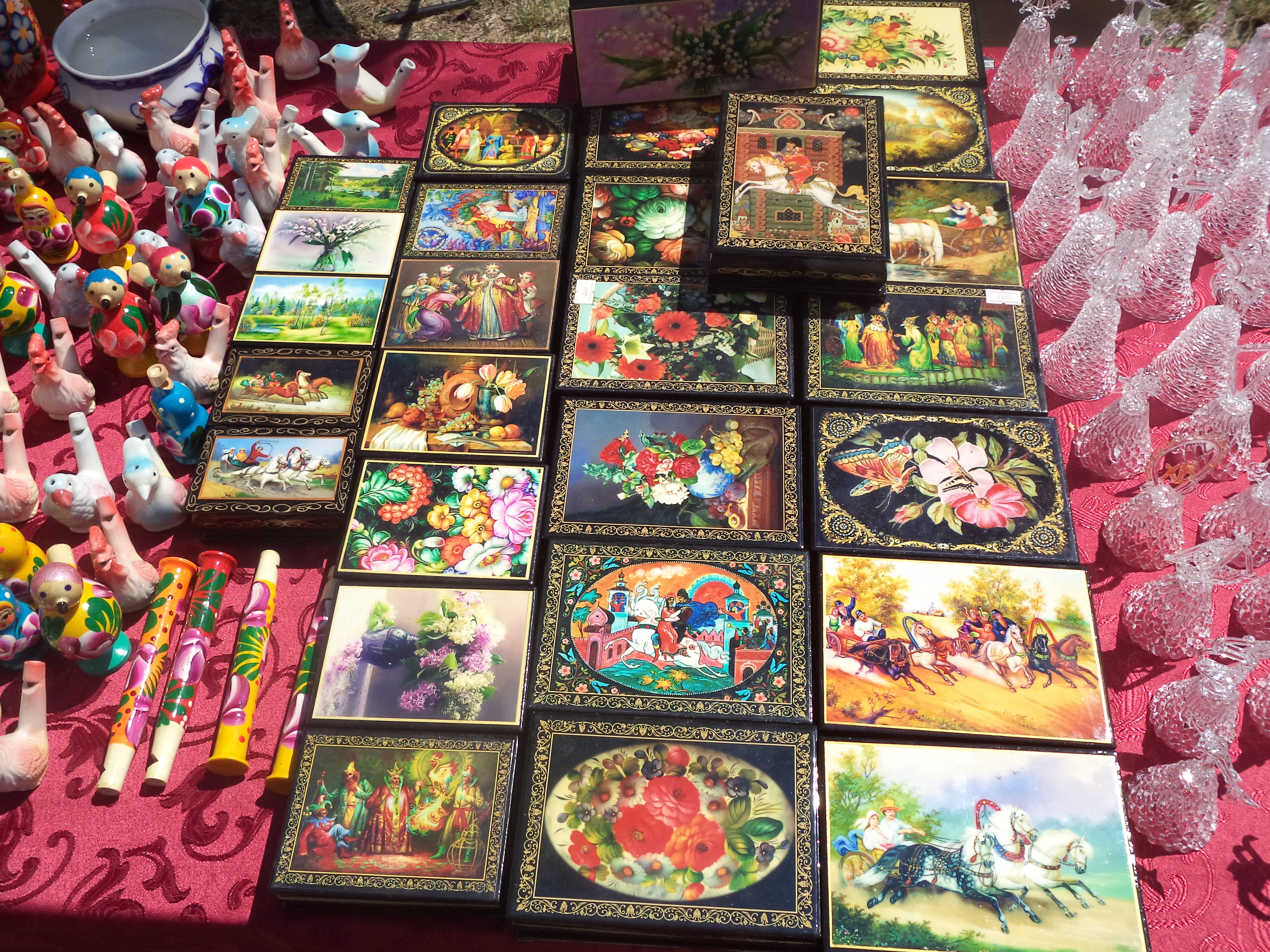
Glass bells, paintings, flutes and ceramics produced by the settlement Murom in Shebekinsky District, Belgorod Oblast

As the Anastasian communities have to be self-sufficient, many of them make an income by producing and selling, to other communities and to city dwellers, various goods, grown on the site or harvested in the vicinity, and artefacts. In some settlements, joint ventures have been organised, for example a carpentry workshop and a sawmill in the settlement of Kovcheg in Kaluga Oblast, and the Sinegorye artel and the Solnechny agricultural complex in the settlement of Vedrussia in Krasnodar Krai. The farming techniques popularised by the Austrian farmer Sepp Holzer are very popular among Anastasians. In one settlement studied by the scholar Artemy A. Pozanenko monetary relations are not welcome on the basis of the idea that in the ancient Vedic times there was no money, and there was only barter; however, this order of things is practised in few settlements.

Many Anastasian settlements produce goods from the Siberian cedar characteristic of the movement (products such as cedar oil, cedar kasha, and cedar amulets) and from birch, others produce willow tea, while in the northwest of Russia other settlements produce "Ivan's tea", a fireweed tea, which they believe to be an indigenous and authentic beverage of the Russian peasants, a legacy of the ancient Russian culture, which has healing and relaxing effects and "suits the body and soul of the Russians", contrary to foreign and harmful beverages. The Grishino village in Leningrad Oblast was among the first to produce "Ivan's tea", and they organised the "Festival of Russian Tea" with the support of the local administration. Other Anastasians grow a variety of vegetables and fruits, one of the most successful products being strawberries. Other settlements manufacture a variety of goods such as solar panels, hives, or sell milk. Beekeeping is a very widespread activity.

Some Anastasian settlers make a living by providing services to other settlers and working in the infrastructure of a settlement or between different villages: doing construction works, giving paid lectures, holding seminars for visitors, and some settlements have implemented mailing services, physical education and circles for children and adults. Residents of Anastasian villages do not reject communication with the non-Anastasian outside world and modern means of communication such as mobile phones, the Internet, and some of them even television, but they want to have complete control over such means.

== Sociology ==
=== Demographics ===
At the 2018 Frankfurt Book Fair, where Vladimir Megre drew a large crowd, it was claimed that The Ringing Cedars of Russia had sold twenty million copies worldwide and had been translated into twenty languages. Anastasian communities have been established all over the world. Starting from spreading in Russia and post-Soviet Eastern Europe, the movement has then spread to Western Europe and Scandinavia, North America, Australia, South Africa, and elsewhere.

According to Leonid Sharashkin, the official translator of The Ringing Cedars of Russia from Russian to English language, "tens of millions" of Russians have embraced Anastasian ideas. Writing in 2009, the scholar Roman Lunkin described Anastasianism as one of the "most massive" new religious movements in Russia, present in all the regions of Russia with "tens of thousands" of adherents. The scholar Anna Ozhiganova reported that in 2015, in Russia, more than ten years after the establishment of the first Anastasian settlements, there were 2,264 people in 981 families who were landowners of an ancestral homestead, and other 8,725 people in 4,725 families who were at different stages of construction of their own ancestral homestead. The scholar Artemy A. Pozanenko reported a similar number of Anastasian settlers, 12,000, in 2016, noting that the number had more than doubled between 2013 and 2015, and yet it was "unwittingly underestimated", given that although the statistics were based on the official registers of the movement, they were not promptly updated and many settlements and settlers did not register on purpose, so that a participant in inter-Anastasian events estimated the number to be closer to 50,000. Pozanenko also reported that there were on average 5-6 ancestral settlements in each region of European Russia and western Siberia, with some regions having a number in the double digits (such as 30 in Krasnodar Krai); the largest settlements were found in Moscow Oblast, in Krasnodar Krai, in the southern and middle Ural region, and in Novosibirsk Oblast.

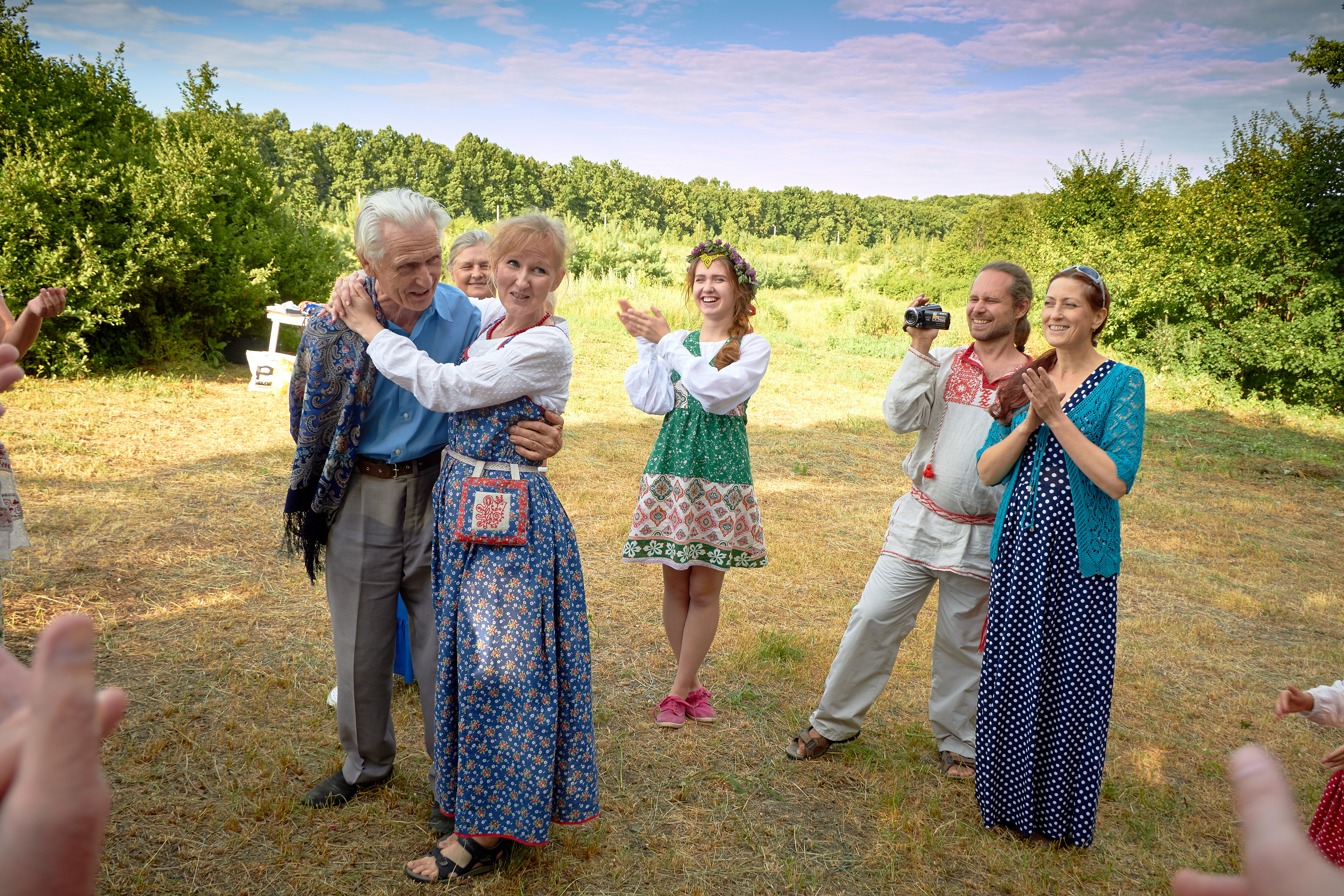
A couple united in marriage at an Anastasian settlement

According to Anastasians themselves, the movement is contributing to the improvement of the demography of Russia in both quality and quantity, as in Anastasian ancestral settlements "conditions are created for the birth, feeding and upbringing of children in favorable conditions for them", so that "the quality of upbringing and education of the younger generation is improving". According to some observers, the Anastasian system of kinship homesteads has also provided a solution to Russia's housing problems. Pozanenko observed that the inhabitants of the Anastasian settlements that he studied are for three fourths members of the "urban intelligentsia with higher education", with 75% of them having graduated from university, a majority in technical and natural sciences, and others in humanities. Single people are extremely rare among Anastasian settlers, as they are often refused admission since they risk not continuing the kinship line, not taking root and not becoming attached to the place. On the other hand, large families are encouraged, and Pozanenko noted that the birth rate in Anastasian villages "is definitely higher than in the whole country". It is common for Anastasian couples to be united according to old Slavic wedding ceremonies which remain unregistered with the state. Some Anastasians bury their dead directly in their own plot of land, planting a tree over the grave to symbolise the rebirth of the deceased; nothing is intended to remain of the burial. They do so believing that public cemeteries are only for the lonely and vagabonds, and this often causes the indignation of the authorities and the misunderstanding of the inhabitants of nearby non-Anastasian villages.

=== Political ideas ===
The central aim of Anastasianism is "to escape from the urban miseries and find God's presence, good ecological environment, have a family and reconstruct national values". The 2000s–2010s Great Recession contributed to the strengthening of Anastasians' eschatological beliefs about the downfall of the evil technocratic Western civilisation and the rise of a new Vedic Golden Age. In 2012, Julia O. Andreeva reported that Megre's books and Anastasians themselves were expecting a law in Russia according to which everyone might get one hectare of land for free. Although in principle Anastasians refute the very idea of party politics, by 2016 some of them had founded the "Native Party" (Родная партия, Rodnaya partiya), which was registered by the Russian Ministry of Justice, and proposed a bill "About kinship homesteads" (О родовых поместьях, O rodovykh pomest'yakh), supported by the Liberal Democratic Party of Russia and by the Communist Party of the Russian Federation (which drafted their own versions of the bill). On 1 May 2016, the president Vladimir Putin enacted the Law on the Far Eastern Hectare.

According to the scholars Julia O. Andreeva and Rasa Pranskevičiūtė, Russian Anastasians tend to give a political meaning to their experience, feeling actively engaged in a movement which frees from the yoke of technocracy and evil Western forces. Russian Anastasians tend to give nationalist connotations to the concept of "love space", extending it to mean the "Russian nation" as an overarching concept, espouse traditionalist values, and Anastasianism for them represents an ethnocultural phenomenon. In the same wake, the imperative to go "back to nature", for Russian Anastasians, means to go back to the values of national motherland and to be independent from the influences of the West. Otherwise, Anastasians in other countries, for instance Lithuania, tend to focus on spiritual beliefs and on the restoration of traditional rites. According to Pranskevičiūtė, Lithuanian Anastasians, whom she found to have values similar to those of their connational Romuvans, tend to interpret the imperative to go "back to nature" as reconnecting with nature as the divine power, the thought, of God.

Anastasians reject the system of modern Western democracy, understanding it as a system of control through conflict, which always inevitably produces disaffected sections in the population. Democracy is explicitly criticised in Megre's books as a "demonocracy" of money, through a myth: the books tell the story of a certain "Demon Cratiy" (Демон Кратий) who invented such a system as a way to subordinate all people to the monetary system through the illusion of freedom. The Anastasians espouse, instead, the system of the veche, the ancient Slavic popular assembly which they believe goes back to the mythical Vedic Golden Age, or otherwise to the Novgorod Republic (1136–1478), as the best model of government, as a form of "self-government" where everyone may express their opinion which will be taken into account in a unanimous decision-making. The Anastasians regularly make reference to the Russian Constitution to support their movement and their political ideas, especially the Article 3 which affirms that the only source of power in Russia is its "multinational population". The idea of uniformity of points of view does not scare away free-thinking Anastasians, as they believe it is evidence of spiritual growth and attachment to divine knowledge. The veche is believed to be a form of government which reflects the theological understanding that reality is spiritually manifold but such manifoldness is the expression of one principle, God, so that "there are many rights, but one truth" (правд много, а истина одна; pravd mnogo, a istina odna). The veche is understood as a "dialogue with God", where decision-making aligned with the order of God naturally emerges. Although in Anastasian philosophy, within the settlements, and at veches, the idea of a singular leadership is refused, and everyone is formally equal, in some settlements there is a clear but often unspoken chief, who is responsible for interaction with the outside world and the authorities: it is the founder of the settlement, or the one in whose name the land for building the settlement was bought.

Within the Anastasian settlements, the veche of the community is held in the common house. For instance, in the Moldovan settlement Schastlivoye, whose model has been widely circulated among Anastasians, the assembly is held weekly in the common house: it begins with a compulsory anthem song which announces it; after the declaration of the topics to be discussed, the participants will speak, and a discussion will follow; all the decisions are then posted in the common house, and within the following week they may be challenged and brought up again for discussion; another song then closes the assembly. The proposers of this model argue that "it is possible to build the structure of civil society, states and peoples on it". Anastasians often organise veches of many settlements in the cities, where representatives of different communities present the experiences, the merits and the difficulties, of their settlements.

=== Relations with Christianity ===
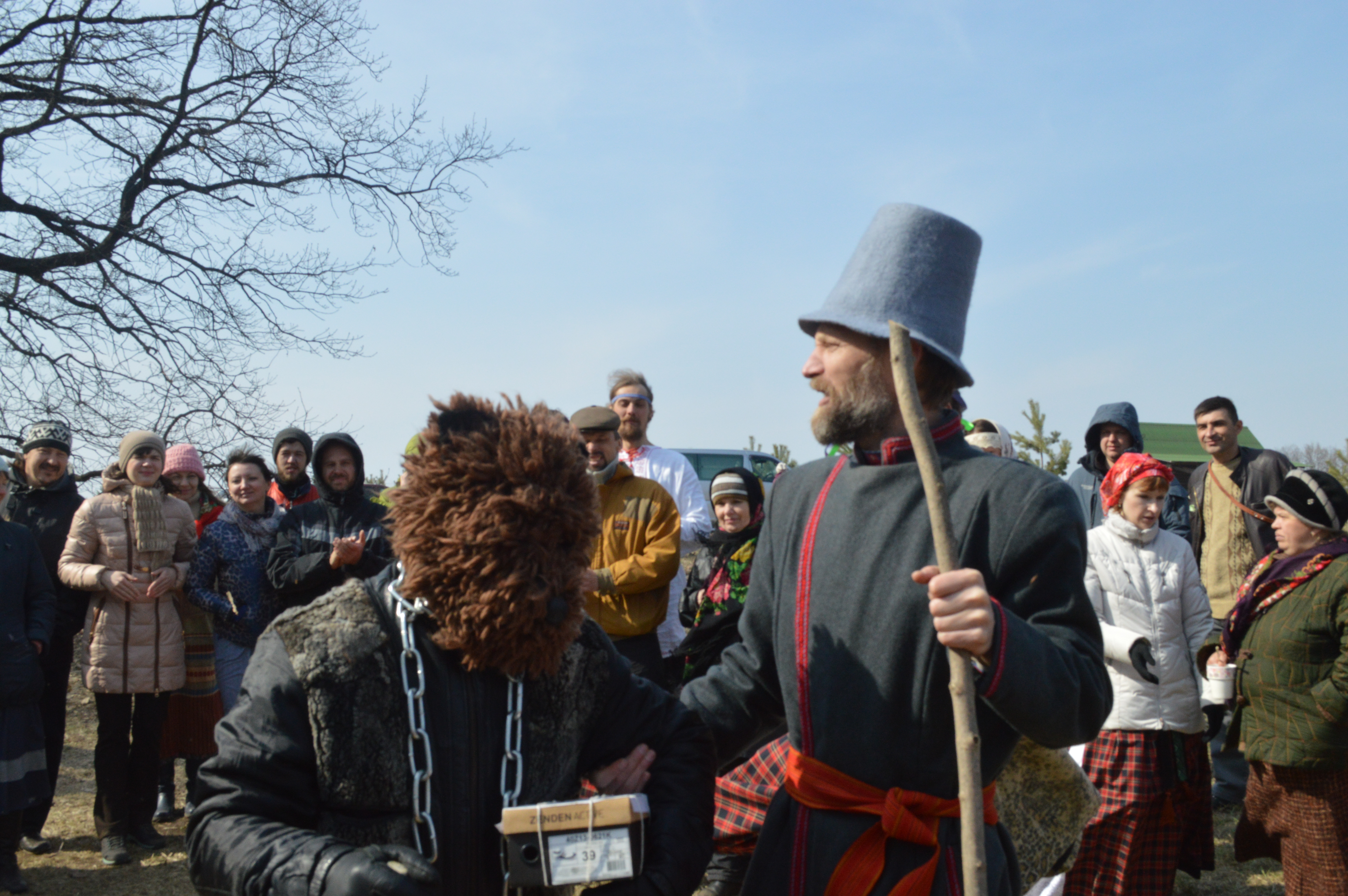
Anastasians gathered to celebrate the Annunciation

In Russia, Anastasianism has been subject of criticism from the Russian Orthodox Church, alarmed by the rise of Neopagan movements in the country, which, in the eyes of hierarchs of the Church, are "filling the void" left by the collapse of the great ideologies of the 20th century. Yet, opinions expressed by hierarchs of the Church tend to be confusing, lacking a deep understanding of the phenomenon and of the different ideological currents within it, so that the hegumen Seraphim of the Monastery of Saint Nicholas in Sargatskoye, Sargatsky District, Omsk Oblast complained that:

Neopagans have appeared here [in the Omsk region], [they are] Cedrists, Anastasians. Well, these are naked women running through the woods. [...] This religion was invented in 1993 by those who loved to go hiking, sit down with a guitar, and things like that. [...] How did it end? The usual Neopaganism: jumping over fires, performances that are not truly ethnic, but new, invented, including on the basis of the Book of Veles and the Vedas, those written by Khinevich [the father of Ynglism], which are banned here and rightly so. At one time, as a dissident, he wrote all these books under the leadership of the State Department; these are their sources. And, correspondingly, the worship of—excuse me—the phallus, well, this is once again Khlystism.

On their part, Anastasians tend to be syncretic and even integrate Christian beliefs and festivals into their religion. They have "practically no acute hostility towards Christians", although most of them consider Christianity to have "proved its complete failure over a thousand years of its reign in Russia". Other hierarchs of the Russian Orthodox Church have called for a dialogue and even integration between Orthodox Christianity and Neopaganism, abandoning the strategies of antagonism and discrimination, prejudice and defamation, while recognising the values about connection with the land and the ancestral tradition that the Neopagan movements carry with themselves, as "it is not worthwhile to erect vain and unfounded vilification and throw mud at our ancestors", as these values were "not even in sight for a thousand years in Russia, for rare exceptions, and even more so in other countries. It is precisely this forgotten culture of the land, if one may call it that, that has now begun to revive in Russia" and could prevent that "we [Russians] become one hundred percent Westerners". About Anastasianism, Sergey V. Kurepin stated that:

Somehow in the mid-90s, an ordinary businessman [Vladimir Megre] engaged in trade on the waterways of Siberia made an unplanned stop with his ship in a place on the banks of a Siberian river and met the local residents. Some of them turned out to be representatives of our ancient, pre-Christian civilisation, who carried through the centuries the entire spectrum of ancient Russian traditions, both religious and cultural. The businessman became very interested in their life and, over the course of several years, became so close to these people that he even married a local girl. Ultimately, he wrote ten books about the life of the Vedrussians, as they call themselves, and our modern life from the perspective of their civilisation. These people have not only preserved the entire pre-Christian culture, but also adequately assess modern reality, know everything about it and even understand some issues better than you and I.

=== Controversy ===
The movement is closely linked to right-wing extremists and antisemitic conspiracy theorists in some countries: German constitutional protection authorities classify the movement as a right-wing extremist suspect; the State Security Service in Austria also observes it.

The book series The Ringing Cedars of Russia and at least a part of the movement are reproducing antisemitic narratives. Jews, writes Vladimir Megre in the seventh book of the series, were persecuted “For using any means they can to make as much money as possible.” So Megre doesn't just depict Jews as greedy and reckless but also blames them for their own persecution. Furthermore, he sees the Tribe of Levi as the hidden power in the world. They would help the other Jews with “manipulating whole nation-states at a time” and get money in return. Jews who control or manipulate world politics is a typical element of conspiracy theories. The movement is closely linked to right-wing extremists and antisemitic conspiracy theorists in some countries (e.g. Switzerland, Germany, and Austria).

== The Ringing Cedars of Russia series ==
- Book 1: Anastasia
- Book 2: The Ringing Cedars of Russia
- Book 3: The Space of Love
- Book 4: Co-creation
- Book 5: Who are We?
- Book 6: The Book of Kin
- Book 7: The Energy of Life
- Book 8.1: The New Civilisation
- Book 8.2: The Rites of Love
- Book 10: Anasta

== See also ==
- Agroforestry
- Siberian Pine
- Slavic Native Faith
- Veganism
- Ynglism
