= Aksyonov =

Aksyonov (masculine) or Aksyonova (feminine), also spelled Aksenov/Aksenova may refer to:

- Aksyonov (surname) (fem. Aksyonova), Russian last name
- Aksenov (rural locality) (or Aksyonova), several rural localities in Russia
- 4777 Aksenov, a main belt asteroid
