= Vladimir Megre =

Russian entrepreneur and writer (born 1950)

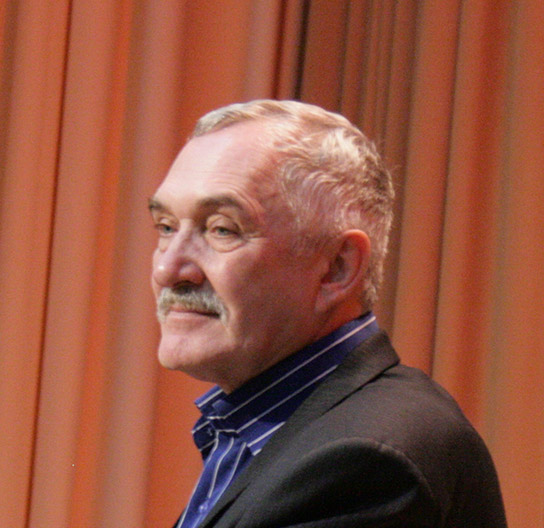
- Megre in Belgorod
- Born: Vladimir Nikolayevich Puzakov; 23 July 1950 (age 75); Chernigov Oblast, Soviet Union, now Ukraine
- Occupations: Entrepreneur, writer
- Notable work: Ringing Cedars of Russia series
- Children: Polina, Vladimir, Anastasia
- Website: vmegre.com/en

Signature
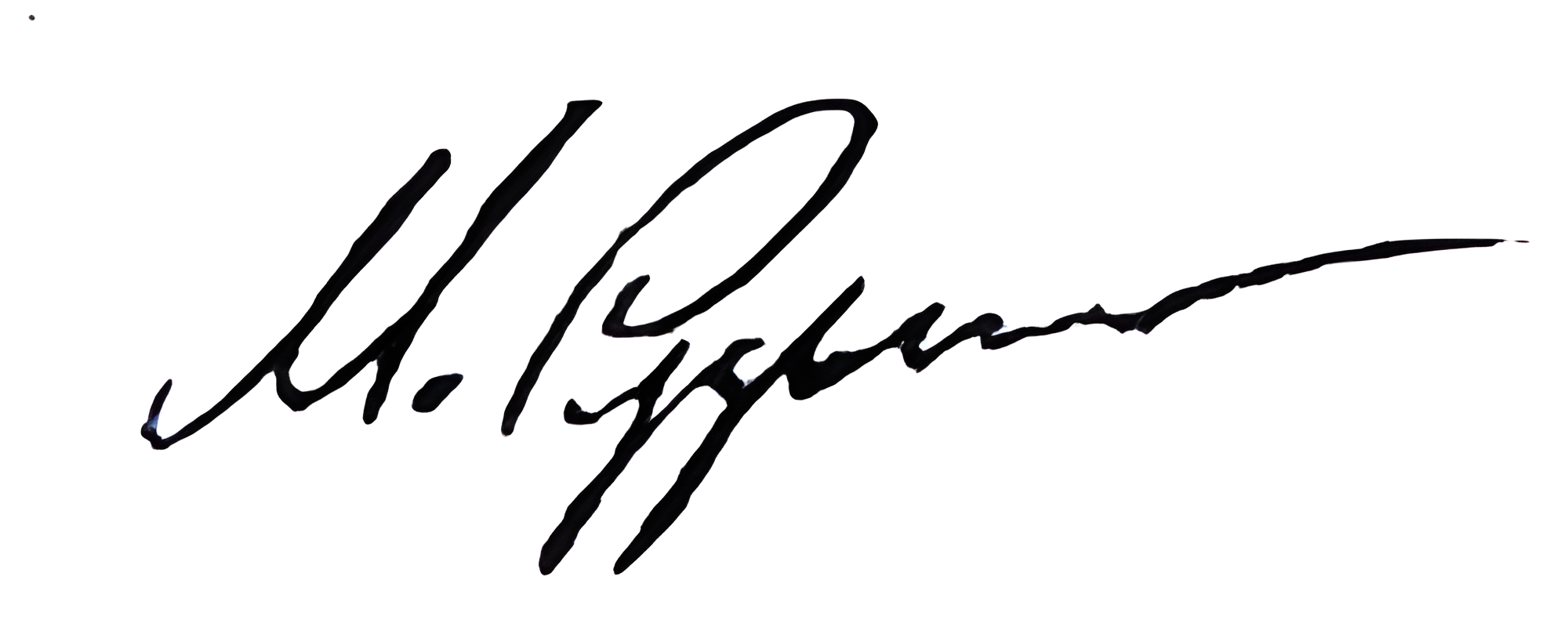

Vladimir Megre (Russian: Влади́мир Никола́евич Мегре́; né Puzakov; Russian: Пузако́в; born 23 July 1950) is a Russian entrepreneur and writer best known as the author of the Ringing Cedars of Russia (also known as Anastasia) series of books, which since the 1990s has given rise to a homonymous socio-religious movement.

== Biography ==
=== Childhood ===
Megre was born in Chernigov Oblast, USSR, in present-day Ukraine, and grew up in the village of Kuznichi. He spent most of his childhood with his grandmother, whom he describes as a village healer. As a teenager in the 1960s, Megre occasionally visited a monk called Father Feodorit at the Trinity-Sergiev Monastery, in Sergiev Posad, north-east of Moscow.

=== Early career ===
Megre left home at age 16 and moved to Novosibirsk, where he worked as a photographer, camera operator and film director in several commercial co-operatives. He married and had a daughter, Polina. As with many other newly capitalistic Russians, he took advantage of Perestroika and the subsequent collapse of the communist system to launch his entrepreneurial career. By the late 1980s had become the president of the Inter-Regional Association of Siberian Entrepreneurs.

In 1994-5 he leased a fleet of river steamers which made two trading voyages along the Ob River north of Novosibirsk.

=== The Ringing Cedars of Russia ===
Megre's experiences on the Ob River voyages form the central narrative of his best-selling series of books, The Ringing Cedars of Russia (Russian: Звенящие Кедры России tr. Zvenyashchiye Kedry Rossii), written between 1996 and 2010. The first volume, Anastasia, was printed on credit at the Moscow Print Press Number 11 and the first copies were sold by the author himself in the Moscow metro.

The primary concern of the series is the correct approach to planning, conceiving and raising children, which should all occur at the same location: a family homestead, or self-sufficient plot of land surrounded by a hedge with a water source, dwelling, woods, a meadow, vegetable gardens, berries, herbs, mushrooms, a greenhouse, sauna and beehives. The homestead should be created by a mother and father for the health and enjoyment of posterity.

Being an entrepreneur, he set up his own company to publish subsequent volumes and a self-organised reader's group soon assisted in distributing the books more widely. The books have sold over 11 million copies, mostly in Russia, and have since been translated into twenty languages.

==== English translations ====
The first English edition was translated and edited in the United States by John Woodsworth and Leonid Sharashkin, under contract with Megre. It was published and distributed in the U.S. by the Ringing Cedars Press, in the United Kingdom by Ringing Cedars UK Limited, and in Australia by Ringing Cedars Australia. However, the contract for this manuscript was cancelled after an unauthorised second edition with a black cover violated the Megre family's understanding of the arrangement. The remaining stock of black-covered books are still for sale though no new copies are permitted to be printed.

In his tenth book, Megre included an appeal to his readers indicating that his author's page is the "only official source for correspondence in all languages from my readers all over the world". Despite this, the U.S., U.K. and Australian websites still claim to be official sites. The most recent English edition is published by the Ringing Cedars Publishing House LLC, based in Novosibirsk and operated by Megre's daughter Polina.

=== Future plans ===
Megre plans to write screenplays to depict the ideas of his books in film.

== The movement of kinship homesteads ==
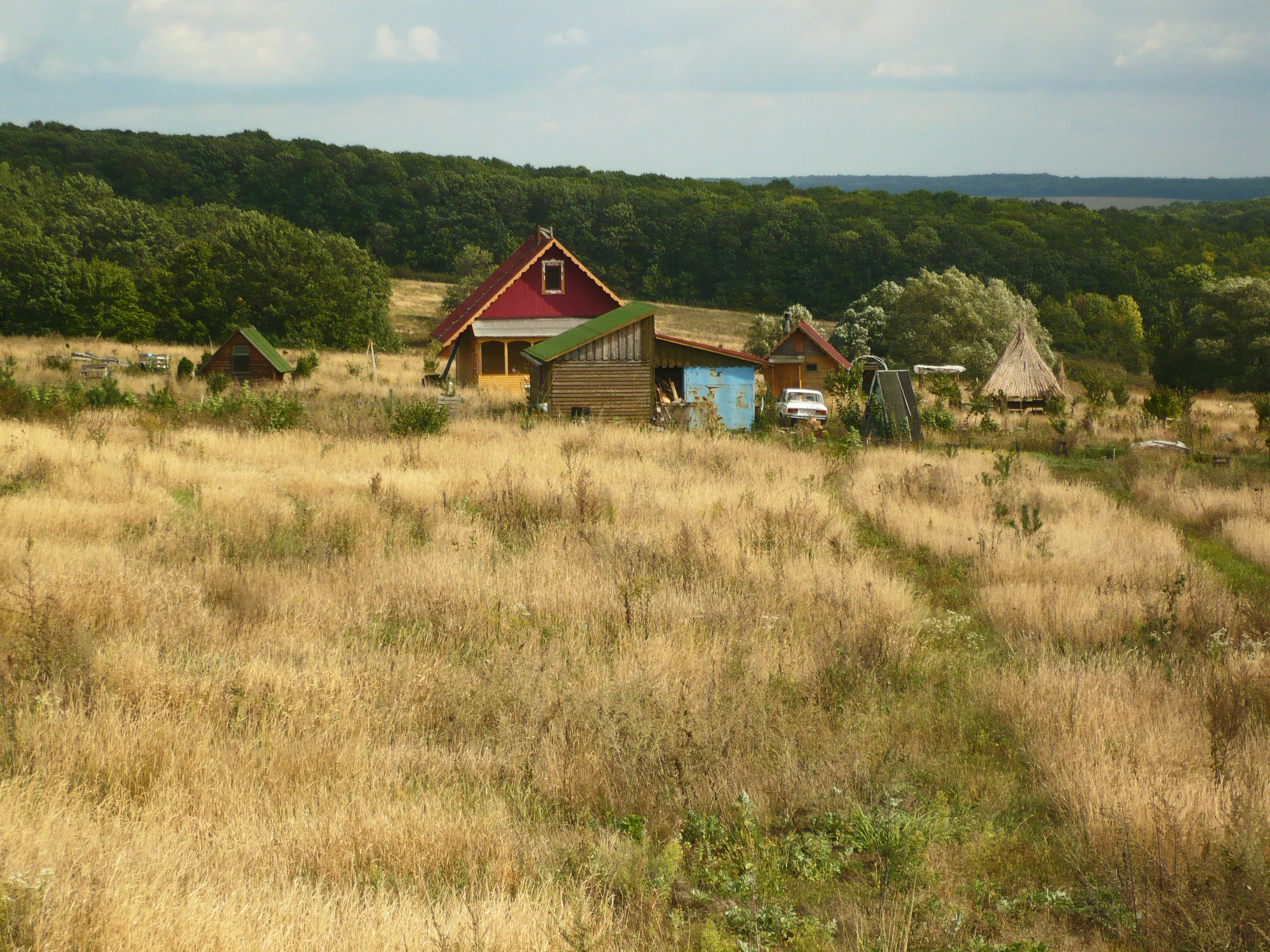
Buildings in the Korenskye kinship estate, an Anastasian settlement in the Shebekinsky District of Belgorod Oblast, Russia.

The central idea of the Ringing Cedars of Russia series is to create a garden and ancestral dwelling on a plot of land at least one hectare in size, known as a "kin's homestead" (Russian: родовое поместье, rodovoye pomest'ye) where nature/generation (Rod) is appropriately cultivated. The result is a living environment perfectly attuned to its human inhabitants, a "love space" for the beneficial conception, birth and upbringing of new generations.

Before the publication of the first book in 1996, there were virtually no family homestead settlements in Russia. In 2014, a conference of the Ringing Cedars' movement in Vladimir city attracted delegates from over 150 family homestead settlements from 48 of the 89 regions of Russia. The current register of Ringing Cedars-inspired settlements lists 213 villages with an Internet presence. During a presentation at the United Nations Nexus Summit in New York City in 2014, Megre presented a map showing the locations of 230 settlements in Russia.

The books have become the basis for a Russian "back-to-the-land" movement based on permanently sustainable, self-reliant, and self-sufficient simple living, providing both physical subsistence and spiritual fulfilment. They combine deep ecology with traditional family values and worship of God (Rod) through nature, unlike communal hippie lifestyles.

Active readers' groups have formed to organise and support the establishment of family homestead settlements. They are found in Australia, the Czech Republic, Germany, Hungary, Lithuania, Russia, Canada and the United States.

== Bibliography ==
- Vladimir Megré, The Ringing Cedars of Russia series

- Anastasia (book 1)
- The Ringing Cedars of Russia (book 2)
- The Space of Love (book 3)
- Co-creation (book 4)
- Who are We? (book 5)
- The Book of Kin (book 6)
- The Energy of Life (book 7)
- The New Civilisation (book 8, part I)
- The Rites of Love (book 8, part II)
- Anasta (book 10)
