= Aksenov (rural locality) =

Aksenov/Aksyonov (Russian: Аксенов/Аксёнов; masculine) or Aksenova/Aksyonova (Аксенова/Аксёнова; feminine) is the name of several rural localities in Russia.

Modern localities

- Aksenov, Rostov Oblast, a khutor in Novotsimlyanskoye Rural Settlement of Tsimlyansky District in Rostov Oblast
- Aksenov, Volgograd Oblast, a khutor in Verkhnekardailsky Selsoviet of Novonikolayevsky District in Volgograd Oblast

Alternative names

- Aksenova, alternative name of Aksenovo, a village in Ivanovskoye Settlement of Sharyinsky District in Kostroma Oblast; 58°8′N 45°30′E
- Aksenova, alternative name of Aksenovo, a village in Belavinskoye Rural Settlement of Orekhovo-Zuyevsky District in Moscow Oblast; 55°38′N 39°25′E
- Aksenova, alternative name of Aksenovo, a village in Vyalkovskoye Rural Settlement of Ramensky District in Moscow Oblast; 55°41′N 38°15′E
- Aksenova, alternative name of Aksenovo, a village under the administrative jurisdiction of Fryanovo Work Settlement in Shchyolkovsky District of Moscow Oblast; 56°6′N 38°25′E
- Aksenova, alternative name of Aksenovo, a village in Chismenskoye Rural Settlement of Volokolamsky District in Moscow Oblast; 56°1′N 35°50′E
- Aksenova, alternative name of Aksenovo, a selo in Aksenovsky Selsoviet of Lyambirsky District in the Republic of Mordovia; 54°15′N 45°21′E

== See also ==
- Aksenovo
- Aksenovka
