= Aksenovo, Republic of Bashkortostan =

Aksenovo Аксёново Аксёнов
- Selo
- Location within Bashkortostan Location within Russia
- Coordinates: 53°54′N 54°36′E
- Country: Russia
- Region: Bashkortostan
- District: Alsheyevsky District
- Time zone: UTC+5:00

Aksenovo (Russian: Аксёново, Bashkir: Аксёнов) is a rural locality (a selo) and the administrative center of Aksyonovsky Selsoviet, Alsheyevsky District, Bashkortostan, Russia. The population was 1,047 as of 2010. There are 15 streets.

== Geography ==
Aksenovo is located 35 km southwest of Rayevsky (the district's administrative centre) by road. Kim is the nearest rural locality.
