= Aksenovka, Altai Krai =

Aksenovka Аксёновка
- Settlement
- Location within Altai Krai Location within Russia
- Coordinates: 51°51′N 81°21′E
- Country: Russia
- Region: Altai Krai
- District: Rubtsovsky District
- Time zone: UTC+7:00

Aksenovka (Russian: Аксёновка) is a rural locality (a settlement) in Novorossiysky Selsoviet, Rubtsovsky District, Altai Krai, Russia. The population was 42 as of 2013. There is 1 street.

== Geography ==
Aksenovka is located 51 km north of Rubtsovsk (the district's administrative centre) by road. Novorossiysky is the nearest rural locality.
