= Aksenov, Volgograd Oblast =

Aksenov Аксёнов
- Khutor
- Location within Volgograd Oblast Location within Russia
- Coordinates: 51°06′N 42°44′E
- Country: Russia
- Region: Volgograd Oblast
- District: Novonikolayevsky District
- Time zone: UTC+4:00

Aksenov (Russian: Аксёнов) is a rural locality (a khutor) in Verkhnekardailskoye Rural Settlement, Novonikolayevsky District, Volgograd Oblast, Russia. The population was 3 as of 2010.

== Geography ==
Aksenov is located in steppe, on the Khopyorsko-Buzulukskaya Plain, on the right bank of the Kupava River, 36 km northeast of Novonikolayevsky (the district's administrative centre) by road. Verkhnekardailsky is the nearest rural locality.
