= Aksenovo, Vyaznikovsky District, Vladimir Oblast =

Aksenovo Аксёново
- Village
- Location within Vladimir Oblast Location within Russia
- Coordinates: 56°11′N 42°24′E
- Country: Russia
- Region: Vladimir Oblast
- District: Vyaznikovsky District
- Time zone: UTC+3:00

Aksenovo (Russian: Аксёново) is a rural locality (a village) in Gorod Vyazniki, Vyaznikovsky District, Vladimir Oblast, Russia. The population was 6 as of 2010.

== Geography ==
Aksenovo is located near the Klyazma River, 18 km southeast of Vyazniki (the district's administrative centre) by road. Perovo is the nearest rural locality.
