= Aksenovo, Vologodsky District, Vologda Oblast =

Aksenovo Аксёново
- Village
- Location within Vologda Oblast Location within Russia
- Coordinates: 59°09′N 39°22′E
- Country: Russia
- Region: Vologda Oblast
- District: Vologodsky District
- Time zone: UTC+3:00

Aksenovo (Russian: Аксёново) is a rural locality (a village) in Staroselskoye Rural Settlement, Vologodsky District, Vologda Oblast, Russia. The population was 10 as of 2002.

== Geography ==
Aksenovo is located 32 km southwest of Vologda (the district's administrative centre) by road. Opuchkovo is the nearest rural locality.
