= Aksenovo, Sudogodsky District, Vladimir Oblast =

Aksenovo Аксёново
- Village
- Location within Vladimir Oblast Location within Russia
- Coordinates: 56°04′N 40°45′E
- Country: Russia
- Region: Vladimir Oblast
- District: Sudogodsky District
- Time zone: UTC+3:00

Aksenovo (Russian: Аксёново) is a rural locality (a village) in Lavrovskoye Rural Settlement, Sudogodsky District, Vladimir Oblast, Russia. The population was 11 as of 2010.

== Geography ==
Aksenovo is located 18 km north of Sudogda (the district's administrative centre) by road. Karpovo is the nearest rural locality.
