= Aksenovo, Gus-Khrustalny District, Vladimir Oblast =

Aksenovo Аксёново
- Village
- Location within Vladimir Oblast Location within Russia
- Coordinates: 55°22′N 40°48′E
- Country: Russia
- Region: Vladimir Oblast
- District: Gus-Khrustalny District
- Time zone: UTC+3:00

Aksenovo (Russian: Аксёново) is a rural locality (a village) in Krasnooktyabrskoye Rural Settlement, Gus-Khrustalny District, Vladimir Oblast, Russia. The population was 401 (2021 census), 443 as of 2010. There are 4 streets.

== Geography ==
Aksenovo is located 40 km south of Gus-Khrustalny (the district's administrative centre) by road. Baranovo is the nearest rural locality.
