= Aksenovo, Altai Krai =

Aksenovo Аксёново
- Selo
- Location within Altai Krai Location within Russia
- Coordinates: 53°15′N 85°52′E
- Country: Russia
- Region: Altai Krai
- District: Yeltsovsky District
- Time zone: UTC+7:00

Aksenovo (Russian: Аксёново) is a rural locality (a selo) in Martynovsky Selsoviet, Yeltsovsky District, Altai Krai, Russia. The population was 24 as of 2013. There is 1 street.

== Geography ==
Aksenovo is located 34 km west of Yeltsovka (the district's administrative centre) by road. Martynovo is the nearest rural locality.
