= Aksenovo, Petushinsky District, Vladimir Oblast =

Aksenovo Аксёново
- Village
- Location within Vladimir Oblast Location within Russia
- Coordinates: 55°55′N 39°34′E
- Country: Russia
- Region: Vladimir Oblast
- District: Petushinsky District
- Time zone: UTC+3:00

Aksenovo (Russian: Аксёново) is a rural locality (a village) in Pekshinskoye Rural Settlement, Petushinsky District, Vladimir Oblast, Russia. The population was 28 as of 2010. There are 2 streets.

== Geography ==
Aksenovo is located on the Bolshaya Lipnya River, 9 km east of Petushki (the district's administrative centre) by road. Novaya is the nearest rural locality.
