= Aksenovka, Vladimir Oblast =

Aksenovka Аксёновка
- Village
- Location within Vladimir Oblast Location within Russia
- Coordinates: 56°23′N 38°54′E
- Country: Russia
- Region: Vladimir Oblast
- District: Alexandrovsky District
- Time zone: UTC+3:00

Aksenovka (Russian: Аксёновка) is a rural locality (a village) in Andreyevskoye Rural Settlement, Alexandrovsky District, Vladimir Oblast, Russia. The population was 61 as of 2010. There is 1 street.

== Geography ==
Aksenovka is located on the Maly Kirchazh River, 12 km east of Alexandrov (the district's administrative centre) by road. Vyalkovka is the nearest rural locality.
