= Aksyonovo railway station =

Railway station in Russia

Aksyonovo Аксёново

General information
- Location: Russia
- Coordinates: 53°55′02″N 54°36′25″E
- Owner: Russian Railways
- Operator: Russian Railways

Construction
- Parking: Available

Other information
- Status: Functioning
- Station code: 65675
- Fare zone: Kuybyshev Railway
Location

Aksyonovo (Russian: Аксёново), listed as Aksenovo, is a railway station in Alsheyevsky District, Bashkortostan, Russia.
