= Sargatskoye =

Sargatskoye Саргатское
- Work settlement
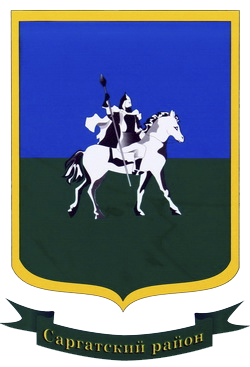
- Flag Coat of arms
- Interactive map of Sargatskoye
- Location of Sargatskoye Sargatskoye (Omsk Oblast)
- Coordinates: 55°36′58″N 73°29′27″E
- Country: Russia
- Federal subject: Omsk Oblast
- Administrative district: Sargatsky District
- Founded: 1764

Population (2010 Census)
  - Total: 8,157
  - Estimate (2025): 7,591 (−6.9%)

Administrative status
  - Capital of: Sargatsky District
- Time zone: UTC+6 (MSK+3)
- Postal code: 646400
- OKTMO ID: 52651151051
- Website: sargat.omskportal.ru

Sargatskoye (Russian: Сарга́тское), colloquially known as Sargatka (Сарга́тка), is an urban locality (a work settlement) and the administrative center of Sargatsky District of Omsk Oblast, Russia, located 75 kilometers (47 mi) north of Omsk along the Irtysh River. Population: 8,157 (2010 census); 8,386 (2002 census); 8,677 (1989 Soviet census).

== Geography ==
Sargatskoye is located about half-way between Omsk and Bolsherechye, and is a stopping point for automobile and river travelers.
