= Sargatsky District =

Sargatsky District Саргатский район (Russian)
- District
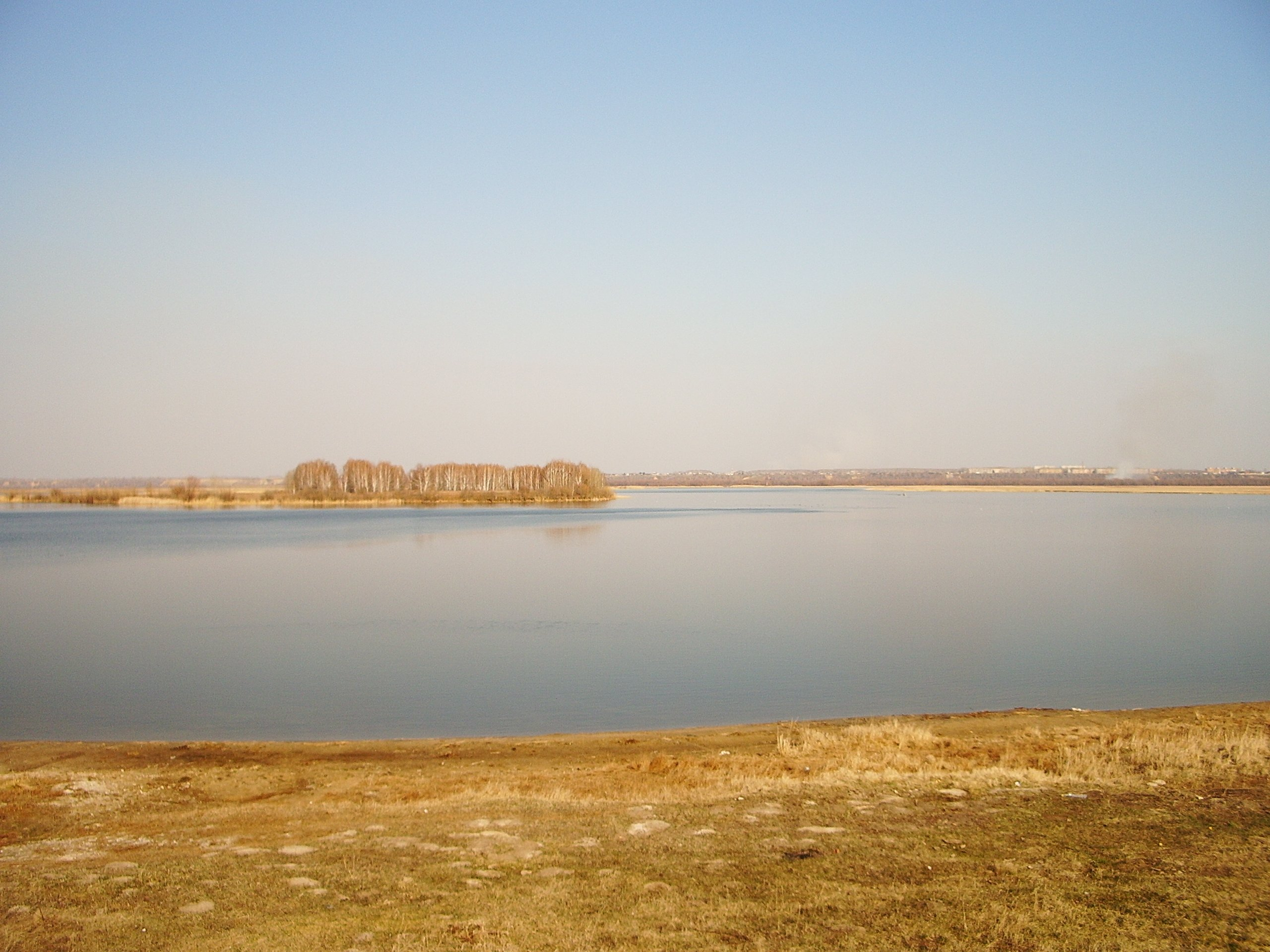
- Landscape in Sargatsky District

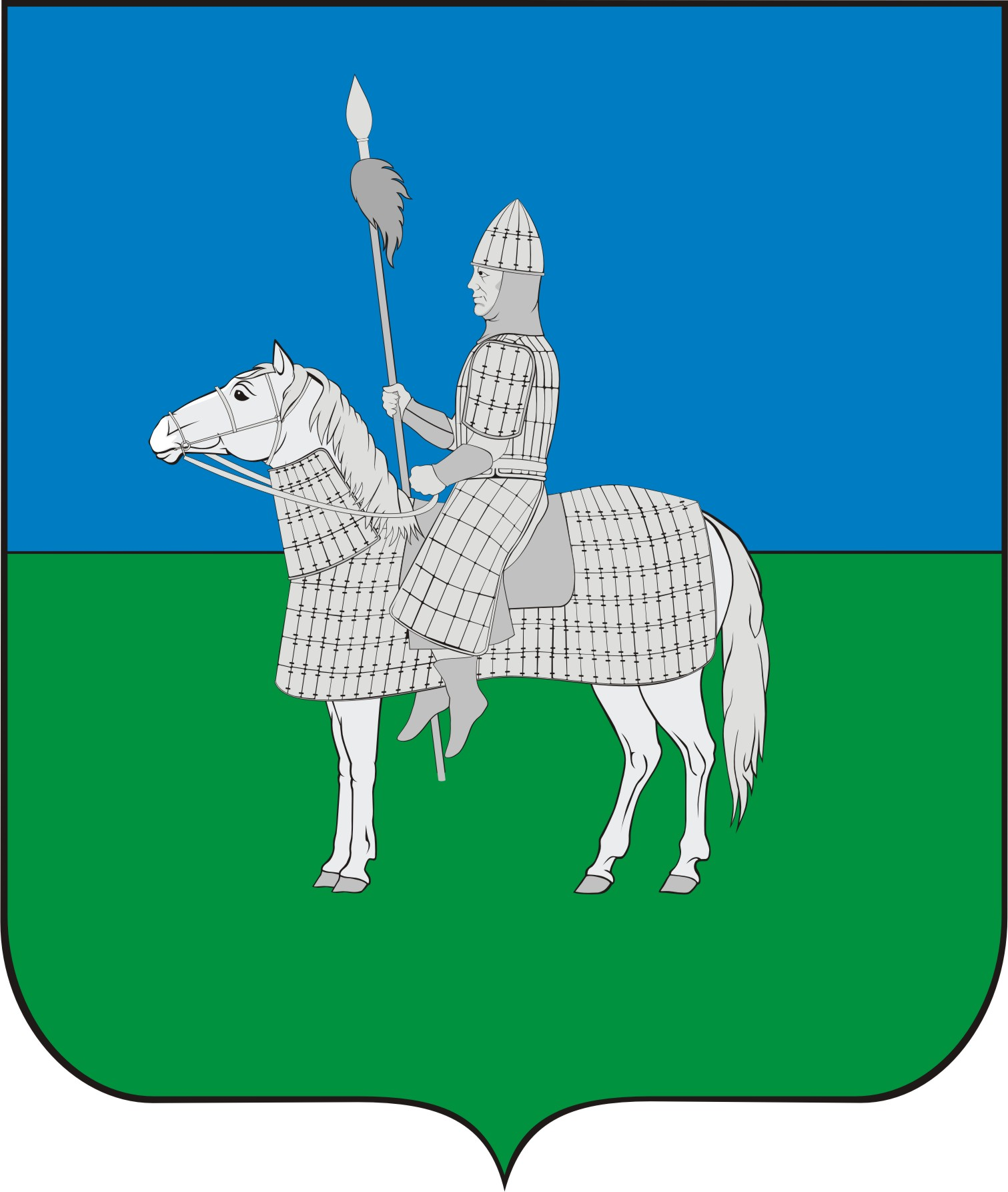
- Flag Coat of arms
- Location of Sargatsky District in Omsk Oblast
- Coordinates: 55°36′58″N 73°29′27″E
- Country: Russia
- Federal subject: Omsk Oblast
- Established: 25 May 1925
- Administrative center: Sargatskoye

Area
  - Total: 3,800 km^{2} (1,500 sq mi)

Population (2010 Census)
  - Total: 20,014
  - Density: 5.3/km^{2} (14/sq mi)
  - Urban: 40.8%
  - Rural: 59.2%

Administrative structure
  - Administrative divisions: 1 Work settlements, 8 Rural okrugs
  - Inhabited localities: 1 urban-type settlements, 41 rural localities

Municipal structure
  - Municipally incorporated as: Sargatsky Municipal District
  - Municipal divisions: 1 urban settlements, 8 rural settlements
- Time zone: UTC+6 (MSK+3)
- OKTMO ID: 52651000
- Website: http://www.sargatskoemr.narod.ru/

Sargatsky District (Russian: Сарга́тский райо́н) is an administrative and municipal district (raion), one of the thirty-two in Omsk Oblast, Russia. It is located in the center of the oblast. The area of the district is 3,800 square kilometers (1,500 sq mi). Its administrative center is the urban locality (a work settlement) of Sargatskoye. Population: 20,014 (2010 Census); 22,320 (2002 census); 23,923 (1989 Soviet census). The population of Sargatskoye accounts for 40.8% of the district's total population.
