= List of European records in finswimming =

Below is the list of current European finswimming records. The records are ratified by the CMAS Confédération Mondiale des Activités Subaquatiques (World Underwater Federation).

== Men ==
Event	Time		Name	Nationality	Date	Meet	Location	Ref
50 m SF	14.83	WR	Max Poschart	Germany	19 July 2025	European Championships	Olsztyn, Poland	
100 m SF	33.71	r, WR	Max Poschart	Germany	24 April 2022	World Cup	Leipzig, Germany	
200 m SF	1:17.71	WR	Nándor Kiss	Hungary	11 August 2025	World Games	Chengdu, China	
400 m SF	2:52.68	WR	Nándor Kiss	Hungary	10 August 2025	World Games	Chengdu, China	
800 m SF	6:12.74	WR	Nándor Kiss	Hungary	15 April 2023	World Cup	Eger, Hungary	
1500 m SF	12:09.74	WR	Ádám Bukor	Hungary	5 July 2017	European Championships	Wrocław, Poland	
50 m BF	17.96	WR	Szebasztián Szabó	Hungary	11 August 2025	World Games	Chengdu, China	
100 m BF	40.45	WR	Szymon Kropidłowski	Poland	10 August 2025	World Games	Chengdu, China	
200 m BF	1:32.85	WR	Kelen Cséplő	Hungary	12 April 2025	World Cup	Barcelona, Spain	
400 m BF	3:25.02	WR	Aleksey Fedkin	CMAS	15 July 2024	World Championships	Belgrade, Serbia	
50m AP	13.70	WR	Pavel Kabanov	Russia	30 June 2019	European Championships	Ioannina, Greece	
100m IM	31.50		Max Poschart	Germany	19 March 2022	World Cup	Lignano Sabbiadoro, Italy	
200m IM	1:11.14	WR	Justus Mörstedt	Germany	1 June 2025	International Cup of the Hanseatic City of Rostock	Rostock, Germany	
400m IM	2:42.30		Denys Grubnik	Ukraine	27 February 2016	World Cup	Eger, Hungary	
4×50m SF relay	59.35	WR	Max Poschart (15.00); Niklas Loßner (14.57); Justus Mörstedt (14.78); Marek Leipold (15.00)	Germany	10 August 2025	World Games	Chengdu, China	
4×100m SF relay	2:16.54	WR	Pavel Kabanov (34.22); Aleksey Kazantsev (34.72); Dmitry Kokorev (33.89); Dmitry Zhurman (33.71)	Russia	22 July 2017	World Games	Wrocław, Poland	
4×200m SF relay	5:22.94	WR	Dmitrii Zhurman (1:21.29); Andrey Barabash (1:20.85); Evgeny Smirnov (1:20.18); Dmitrii Kokorev (1:20.62)	Russia	29 July 2014	European Championships	Lignano Sabbiadoro, Italy	

== Women ==
Event	Time		Name	Nationality	Date	Meet	Location	Ref
50m SF	17.36		Diana Sliseva	CMAS	26 June 2026	World Championships	Incheon, South Korea	
100m SF	38.02		Ekaterina Mikhailushkina	Russia	5 July 2021	World Championships	Tomsk, Russia	
200m SF	1:25.41	WR	Valeriya Baranovskaya	Russia	21 July 2017	World Games	Wrocław, Poland	
400m SF	3:11.88	WR	Sofiia Hrechko	Ukraine	11 August 2025	World Games	Chengdu, China	
800m SF	6:46.98		Elizaveta Kupressova	CMAS	16 February 2025	Russian Championships	Saratov, Russia	
1500m SF	13:11.09		Johanna Schikora	Germany	13 May 2022	German Junior Championships	Rostock, Germany	
50m BF	20.52	WR	Petra Senánszky	Hungary	21 July 2017	World Games	Wrocław, Poland	
100m BF	45.16	WR	Petra Senánszky	Hungary	22 July 2017	World Games	Wrocław, Poland	
200m BF	1:41.42	WR	Petra Senánszky	Hungary	24 June 2016	World Championships	Volos, Greece	
400m BF	3:42.86	WR	Arina Pantina	CMAS	27 June 2026	World Championships	Incheon, South Korea	
50m AP	15.74		Diana Sliseva	Individual Neutral Athletes	10 August 2025	World Games	Chengdu, China	
100m IM	36.35	=	Sofia Ktena	Greece	29 July 2016	-	Athens, Greece	
100m IM	36.35	=	Alena Parshina	Russia	6 July 2021	World Championships	Tomsk, Russia	
200m IM	1:20.84		Kseniia Saprykina	CMAS	21 June 2025	World Junior Championships	Chios, Greece	
400m IM	2:56.71		Kseniia Saprykina	CMAS	27 June 2026	World Championships	Incheon, South Korea	
4×50m SF relay	1:09.12		Diana Sliseva (17.39); Valeriia Proshina (16.92); Alina Nalbandian (17.44); Ekaterina Mikhaylushkina (17.37)	CMAS	27 June 2026	World Championships	Incheon, South Korea	
4×100m SF relay	2:34.54	WR	Ekaterina Mikhailushkina (39.38); Anna Ber (38.64); Alexsandra Skurlatova (38.37); Vera Iljushina (38.15)	Russia	26 June 2016	World Championships	Volos, Greece	
4×200m SF relay	5:49.86	WR	Valeriia Baranovskaya (1:26.38); Vlada Markina (1:30.59); Mariia Patlasova (1:26.41); Ekaterina Mikhailushkina (1:26.48)	Russia	7 July 2021	World Championships	Tomsk, Russia	

== Mixed ==
Event	Time		Name	Nationality	Date	Meet	Location	Ref
4×100 m SB relay	2:41.82	WR	Aleksei Fedkin (41.85); Iana Martynova (47.39); Iaroslav Peshkov (34.46); Diana Sliseva (38.12)	CMAS	26 June 2026	World Championships	Incheon, South Korea	
4×100 m BF relay	2:55.34	WR	Péter Holoda (41.83); Kelen Cséplő (42.12); Krisztina Varga (46.55); Petra Senánszky (44.84)	Hungary	6 July 2021	World Championships	Tomsk, Russia	

Legend: # – Record awaiting ratification by CMAS;
Records not set in finals: h – heat; so – swim-off

== Junior – boys ==
Event	Time		Name	Nationality	Date	Meet	Location	Ref
50m SF	15.41	WJR	Egor Kachmashev	Russia	1 August 2019	World Junior Championships	Sharm El Sheikh, Egypt	
100m SF	34.36	WJR	Egor Kachmashev	Russia	27 June 2019	European Championships	Ioannina, Greece	
200m SF	1:20.05	WJR	Egor Kachmashev	Russia	28 June 2019	European Championships	Ioannina, Greece	
400m SF	2:56.07	WJR	Nándor Kiss	Hungary	20 July 2022	World Championships	Cali, Colombia	
800m SF	6:13.53	WJR	Nándor Kiss	Hungary	26 February 2022	World Cup	Eger, Hungary	
1500m SF	12:22.74	WJR	Ádám Bukor	Slovakia	7 July 2016	World Junior Championships	Annemasse, France	
50m BF	18.79	WJR	Aleksey Fedkin	Russia	1 August 2018	European Junior Championships	Istanbul, Turkey	
100m BF	41.56	WJR	Aleksey Fedkin	Russia	30 July 2018	European Junior Championships	Istanbul, Turkey	
200m BF	1:34.03	WJR	Aleksey Fedkin	Russia	31 July 2018	European Junior Championships	Istanbul, Turkey	
400m BF	3:26.69	WJR	Aleksey Fedkin	Russia	1 August 2018	European Junior Championships	Istanbul, Turkey	
50m AP	14.19	WJR	Nicklas Loßner	Germany	14 May 2023	German Championships	Leipzig, Germany	
100m IM	31.84	WJR	Evgeny Skorzhenko	Russia	4 September 2001	European Championships	Eger, Hungary	
200m IM	1:18.21	WJR	Angelos Korompylis	Greece	15 February 2026	Panhellenic Winter Games	Volos, Greece	
200m IM	1:17.25	#, WJR	Angelos Korompylis	Greece	10 June 2026	European Junior Championships	Chios, Greece	
400m IM	2:48.25	WJR	Denys Grubnik	Ukraine	24 August 2009	World Championships	Saint Petersburg, Russia	
4×50m SF relay	1:05.91		Vasileios Logothetis (17.07); Konstantinos Tsiaousis (15.81); Konstantinos Gkiokas (17.49); Angelos Korompylis (15.54)	Greece	22 June 2025	World Junior Championships	Chios, Greece	
4×50m SF relay	1:04.48	#, WJR	Ioannis Bainaktaris (16.89); Konstantinos Tsiaousis (18.13); Ioannis Armatas (14.63); Angelos Korompylis (14.83)	Greece	10 June 2026	European Junior Championships	Chios, Greece	
4×100m SF relay	2:24.01	WJR	Viacheslav Popov (36.69); Alexander Semeenko (36.91); Dmitri Zhurman (36.10); Roman Giniyatulin (34.31)	Russia	29 June 2014	World Junior Championships	Chania, Greece	
4×200m SF relay	5:34.39	WJR	Vadim Nekrasov (1:26.08); Denis Arshanov (1:23.96); Viacheslav Popov (1:22.07); Dmitri Zhurman (1:22.28)	Russia	27 June 2014	World Junior Championships	Chania, Greece	

== Junior – girls ==
Event	Time		Name	Nationality	Date	Meet	Location	Ref
50m SF	17.42	WJR	Maria Iliaki	Greece	29 June 2024	European Junior Championships	Klaipėda, Lithuania	
100m SF	38.28	WJR	Ekaterina Mikhailushkina	Russia	16 July 2018	World Championships	Belgrade, Serbia	
200m SF	1:26.39	WJR	Ekaterina Mikhailushkina	Russia	5 July 2017	European Championships	Wrocław, Poland	
400m SF	3:12.27	WJR	Anna Yakovleva	Ukraine	11 August 2025	World Games	Chengdu, China	
800m SF	6:46.98	WJR	Elizaveta Kupressova	CMAS	16 February 2025	Russian Cup	Saratov, Russia	
1500m SF	13:23.86	WJR	Anna Leonardi	Italy	17 July 2025	European Championships	Olsztyn, Poland	
50m BF	21.48	=, WJR	Zoe Turucz	Hungary	28 June 2024	European Junior Championships	Klaipėda, Lithuania	
50m BF	21.48	=, WJR	Polina Ivanushkina	CMAS	23 June 2025	World Junior Championships	Chios, Greece	
100m BF	47.16	WJR	Maria Patlasova	Russia	6 July 2016	World Junior Championships	Annemasse, France	
200m BF	1:42.46	WJR	Maria Patlasova	Russia	7 July 2016	World Junior Championships	Annemasse, France	
400m BF	3:46.00	WJR	Arina Pantina	Russia	17 June 2021	World Junior Championships	Lignano Sabbiadoro, Italy	
50m AP	16.28		Ifigeneia Teliousi	Greece	27 June 2024	European Junior Championships	Klaipėda, Lithuania	
100m IM	36.95		Diana Sliseva	Russia	16 June 2021	World Junior Championships	Lignano Sabbiadoro, Italy	
200m IM	1:20.84	WJR	Kseniia Saprykina	CMAS	21 June 2025	World Junior Championships	Chios, Greece	
400m IM	3:02.01		Viktoria Partsakhashvili	Russia	6 July 2017	European Championships	Wrocław, Poland	
4×50m SF relay	1:12.63	WJR	Maiia Horenok (18.57); Anna Yakovleva (17.85); Veronika Vorobiova (18.87); Yelyzaveta Hrechykhina (17.34)	Ukraine	23 June 2025	World Junior Championships	Chios, Greece	
4×100m SF relay	2:40.52	WJR	Anastasia Zviagina (40.82); Tatiana Prichinina (41.47); Elena Lopatina (39.49); Ekaterina Mikhailushkina (38.74)	Russia	2 August 2018	European Junior Championships	Istanbul, Turkey	
4×200m SF relay	6:04.05	WJR	Anastasia Zviagina (1:31.72); Tatiana Prichinina (1:34.15); Elena Lopatina (1:30.60); Ekaterina Mikhailushkina (1:27.58)	Russia	1 August 2018	European Junior Championships	Istanbul, Turkey	

== Junior – mixed ==
Event	Time		Name	Nationality	Date	Meet	Location	Ref
4×100 m SB relay	2:46.60	WJR	Vasileios Giannitsakis (43.35); Lydia Panteloglou (48.32); Athanasios Michailidis (36.45); Maria Iliaki (38.48)	Greece	30 June 2024	European Junior Championships	Klaipėda, Lithuania	
4×100 m BF relay	3:02.44	WJR	Danila Inbulaev (43.41); Aleksey Fedkin (41.00); Elizaveta Maximenko (49.61); Iana Martynova (48.42)	Russia	30 July 2018	European Junior Championships	Istanbul, Turkey	

Legend: # – Record awaiting ratification by CMAS;
Records not set in finals: h – heat; so – swim-off

== See also ==
- List of world records in finswimming
