= Anastasiia Antoniak =

Ukrainian swimmer (born 1997)

Personal information
- Full name: Anastasiia Volodymyrivna Antoniak
- Born: 21 June 1997 (age 29) Kyiv, Ukraine
- Height: 174 cm (5 ft 9 in)
- Weight: 64 kg (141 lb)

Sport
- Sport: Swimming
- Strokes: Finswimming
Medal record
Event	1st	2nd	3rd
World Games	0	1	3
World Championships	1	10	3
European Championships	2	7	4
Total	3	18	10
Women's finswimming
Representing Ukraine
World Games
Silver medal – second place	2013 Cali	4×100 m surface
Bronze medal – third place	2017 Wrocław	200 m surface
Bronze medal – third place	2017 Wrocław	400 m surface
Bronze medal – third place	2022 Birmingham	400 m surface
World Championships
Gold medal – first place	2022 Cali	4×200 m surface
Silver medal – second place	2011 Hódmezővásárhely	4×200 m surface
Silver medal – second place	2013 Kazan	4×100 m surface
Silver medal – second place	2013 Kazan	4×200 m surface
Silver medal – second place	2015 Yantai	400 m surface
Silver medal – second place	2015 Yantai	4×200 m surface
Silver medal – second place	2016 Volos	400 m surface
Silver medal – second place	2018 Belgrade	200 m surface
Silver medal – second place	2021 Tomsk	400 m surface
Silver medal – second place	2021 Tomsk	4×200 m surface
Silver medal – second place	2022 Cali	400 m surface
Bronze medal – third place	2011 Hódmezővásárhely	4×100 m surface
Bronze medal – third place	2016 Volos	4×200 m surface
Bronze medal – third place	2018 Belgrade	4×200 m surface
European Championships
Gold medal – first place	2017 Wrocław	400 m surface
Gold medal – first place	2023 Budapest	4×200 m surface
Silver medal – second place	2012 Lignano	4×100 m surface
Silver medal – second place	2012 Lignano	4×200 m surface
Silver medal – second place	2014 Lignano	400 m surface
Silver medal – second place	2014 Lignano	4×200 m surface
Silver medal – second place	2017 Wrocław	4×200 m surface
Silver medal – second place	2019 Yanina	4×100 m surface
Silver medal – second place	2019 Yanina	4×200 m surface
Bronze medal – third place	2014 Lignano	100 m surface
Bronze medal – third place	2014 Lignano	200 m surface
Bronze medal – third place	2017 Wrocław	200 m surface
Bronze medal – third place	2017 Wrocław	4×100 m surface

Anastasiia Volodymyrivna Antoniak (Ukrainian: Анастасія Володимирівна Антоняк, born 21 June 1997) is a Ukrainian finswimmer.

== Career ==
Antoniak was born on 21 June 1997 in Kyiv. She won her first silver medal at the 2011 Finswimming World Championships in the 4 × 200 m surface relay and a bronze one in the 4 × 100 m surface relay.

The following year, she won two silver medals in the 4×100 and 4×200 metres surface relay at the European Finswimming Championships in Lignano.

In 2013, at the World Championships, held in Kazan, Antoniak received two silver medals in the 4×100 and 4×200 metres surface. In that year, she won a silver medal in the 4 × 100 m surface at the World Games, held in Cali. Later, she competed at the European Junior Championships, where she won three gold and two silver medals and also broke the world record in the 400 m surface.

The following year, at the Finswimming European Championships in Lignano, she won two silver and two bronze medals in different surface events.

At the 2015 Finswimming World Championships Antoniak won two silver medals in the 400 m surface and 4×200 metres surface relay. At the following World Championships in Volos Antoniak won a silver medal in the 400 m surface and a bronze one in the 4×200 metres surface relay.

In 2017, Antoniak competed at the European Championships in Wrocław, winning a first gold medal in the 400 m surface and two bronze ones in the 200 m surface and 4×200 metres surface relay. Later, Antoniak won two bronze medals in the 200 and 400 metres surface at the World Games in Wrocław.

At the 2018 Finswimming World Championships Antoniak won a silver medal in the 200 m surface and a bronze one in the 4×200 metres surface relay.

In 2019, Antoniak won two gold medals in the 400 metres mixed surface and 4×100 metres surface relay at the Finswimming World Cup in Coral Springs, Florida. Later, she won two silver medals in the 4×100 and 4×200 metres surface relay at the European Championships in Yanina.

In 2021, Antoniak won two silver medals in the 400 m surface and 4×200 metres surface relay at the World Championships in Tomsk.

The following year, Antoniak received a gold medal in the 4×200 metres surface relay and a silver one in the 400 m surface at the 2022 Finswimming World Championships in Cali. Later, she won a bronze medal in the 400 m surface at the 2022 World Games in Birmingham.

The following year, she won the gold medal in the 4×200 metres surface relay at the 28th CMAS Finswimming European Championships in Budapest.
