= Finswimming at the 2009 World Games – Women's 100 m surface =

Finswimming – women's 100 m surface at the 2009 World Games
- Venue: Kaohsiung Swimming Pool
- Location: Kaohsiung, Taiwan
- Date: 24 July 2009
- Competitors: 14 from 10 nations

Medalists
gold medal	(China) Zhu Baozhen
silver medal	(China) Liang Yaoyue
bronze medal	(France) Camille Heitz (South Korea) Choi Sae-rom

The women's 100 m surface competition in finswimming at the 2009 World Games took place on 24 July 2009 at the Kaohsiung Swimming Pool in Kaohsiung, Taiwan.

== Competition format ==
A total of 14 athletes entered the competition. The best eight athletes from preliminary round qualifies to the final.

== Results ==
=== Preliminary ===
Rank	Athlete	Nation	Time	Note
1	Zhu Baozhen	China	40.25	Q
2	Liang Yaoyue	China	40.46	Q
3	Jang Ye-sol	South Korea	40.54	Q
4	Lilla Szekely	Hungary	40.58	Q
5	Camille Heitz	France	40.59	Q
6	Kateryna Dyelova	Ukraine	41.08	Q
7	Margaryta Artiushenko	Ukraine	41.19	Q
8	Choi Sae-rom	South Korea	41.63	Q
9	Galija Sattarova	Estonia	41.73	
10	Tina Hirschfeldt	Germany	42.21	
11	Sandra Pilz	Germany	42.22	
12	Medeya Dzhavakhishvili	Russia	42.48	
13	Roberta Mastroianni	Italy	43.13	
14	Toka El-Kordi	Egypt	45.32	

=== Final ===
Rank	Athlete	Nation	Time	Note
1st place, gold medalist(s)	Zhu Baozhen	China	38.11	WR
2nd place, silver medalist(s)	Liang Yaoyue	China	38.81	
3rd place, bronze medalist(s)	Camille Heitz	France	40.42	
3rd place, bronze medalist(s)	Choi Sae-rom	South Korea	40.42	
5	Margaryta Artiushenko	Ukraine	40.47	
6	Lilla Szekely	Hungary	40.72	
7	Kateryna Dyelova	Ukraine	40.91	
	Jang Ye-sol	South Korea	DSQ	
