= List of world records in finswimming =

The following is the list of world records in finswimming recognised by the sport's governing body, Confédération Mondiale des Activités Subaquatiques (CMAS). CMAS does not recognise short course records.

== Requirements for recognition of records ==
As of January 2013, CMAS recognises world and other records for the following techniques and distances for both males and females in the age groups of Senior (i.e. 18 years and older) and Junior (i.e. 12 to 17 years old) where these are made in an Olympic-size swimming pool (i.e. 50m length) and are measured by electronic automatic officiating equipment:

- Surface finswimming (SF) – individual races for distances of 50m, 100m, 200m, 400m, 800m and 1500m, and relays for 4 × 100 m and 4 × 200 m.
- Bi-Fins (BF, also known as ‘Stereo-fins’) – 50m, 100m, 200m and 400m.
- Apnoea finswimming (AP also known as ‘apnea’) – 50m.
- Immersion finswimming (IM) – 100m, 400m and 800m.

The International Rules also allow for recognition of a record swimming time in the first lap of a relay race or an immediate distance as part of a longer swimming distance. Records made at the CMAS World and Continental Championships and at the World Games are automatically registered. Records made outside of the above-mentioned competitions can be recognised as subject to the attempt being an individual attempt and that at least three days public notice of the attempt is given. National records can be recognised if a record's time is equal to or better than the prevailing world record.

As of January 2013, the International Rules do not discuss the matter of records made for open water/long distance finswimming.

== Records ==
=== Men ===
Event	Time		Name	Nationality	Date	Meet	Location	Ref
50 m SF	14.83		Max Poschart	Germany	19 July 2025	European Championships	Olsztyn, Poland	
100 m SF	33.71	r	Max Poschart	Germany	24 April 2022	World Cup	Leipzig, Germany	
200 m SF	1:17.71		Nándor Kiss	Hungary	11 August 2025	World Games	Chengdu, China	
400 m SF	2:52.68		Nándor Kiss	Hungary	10 August 2025	World Games	Chengdu, China	
800 m SF	6:12.74		Nándor Kiss	Hungary	15 April 2023	World Cup	Eger, Hungary	
1500 m SF	12:09.74		Ádám Bukor	Hungary	5 July 2017	European Championships	Wrocław, Poland	
50 m BF	17.96		Szebasztián Szabó	Hungary	11 August 2025	World Games	Chengdu, China	
100 m BF	40.45		Szymon Kropidłowski	Poland	10 August 2025	World Games	Chengdu, China	
200 m BF	1:32.85		Kelen Cséplő	Hungary	12 April 2025	World Cup	Barcelona, Spain	
400 m BF	3:25.02		Aleksey Fedkin	CMAS	15 July 2024	World Championships	Belgrade, Serbia	
50m AP	13.70		Pavel Kabanov	Russia	30 June 2019	European Championships	Ioannina, Greece	
100m IM	30.70		Shin Myeong-jun	South Korea	25 June 2026	World Championships	Incheon, South Korea	
200m IM	1:11.14		Justus Mörstedt	Germany	1 June 2025	International Cup of the Hanseatic City of Rostock	Rostock, Germany	
400m IM	2:40.40		Chi Cheng	China	25 June 2016	World Championships	Volos, Greece	
4×50m SF relay	59.35		Max Poschart (15.00); Niklas Loßner (14.57); Justus Mörstedt (14.78); Marek Leipold (15.00)	Germany	10 August 2025	World Games	Chengdu, China	
4×100m SF relay	2:16.54		Pavel Kabanov (34.22); Aleksey Kazantsev (34.72); Dmitry Kokorev (33.89); Dmitrii Zhurman (33.71)	Russia	22 July 2017	World Games	Wrocław, Poland	
4×200m SF relay	5:22.94		Dmitrii Zhurman (1:21.29); Andrey Barabash (1:20.85); Evgeny Smirnov (1:20.18); Dmitrii Kokorev (1:20.62)	Russia	29 July 2014	European Championships	Lignano Sabbiadoro, Italy	

Legend: # – Record awaiting ratification by CMAS;
Records not set in finals: h – heat; r – relay 1st leg; rh – relay heat 1st leg; so – swim-off

=== Women ===
Event	Time	Name	Nationality	Date	Meet	Location	Ref
50m SF	16.94	Jang Ye-sol	South Korea	25 June 2016	World Championships	Volos, Greece	
100m SF	37.75	Hu Yaoyao	China	16 July 2024	World Championships	Belgrade, Serbia	
200m SF	1:25.41	Valeriya Baranovskaya	Russia	21 July 2017	World Games	Wrocław, Poland	
400m SF	3:11.88	Sofiia Hrechko	Ukraine	11 August 2025	World Games	Chengdu, China	
800m SF	6:46.79	Liu Jiao	China	1 August 2011	World Championships	Hódmezővásárhely, Hungary	
1500m SF	13:01.48	Liu Jiao	China	3 August 2011	World Championships	Hódmezővásárhely, Hungary	
50m BF	20.52	Petra Senánszky	Hungary	21 July 2017	World Games	Wrocław, Poland	
100m BF	45.16	Petra Senánszky	Hungary	22 July 2017	World Games	Wrocław, Poland	
200m BF	1:41.42	Petra Senánszky	Hungary	24 June 2016	World Championships	Volos, Greece	
400m BF	3:42.86	Arina Pantina	CMAS	27 June 2026	World Championships	Incheon, South Korea	
50m AP	15.10	Zhu Baozhen	China	24 July 2009	World Games	Kaoshiung, Chinese Taipei	
100m IM	34.46	Zhu Baozhen	China	24 August 2009	World Championships	Saint Petersburg, Russia	
200m IM	1:18.05	Yao Huali	China	14 July 2024	World Championships	Belgrade, Serbia	
400m IM	2:53.99	Yao Huali	China	15 July 2024	World Championships	Belgrade, Serbia	
4×50m SF relay	1:07.99	Xie Wenmin (17.38); Shu Chengjing (17.03); Xu Yichuan (17.14); Hu Yaoyao (16.44)	China	11 August 2025	World Games	Chengdu, China	
4×100m SF relay	2:34.54	Ekaterina Mikhailushkina (39.38); Anna Ber (38.64); Alexsandra Skurlatova (38.37); Vera Ilyushina (38.15)	Russia	26 June 2016	World Championships	Volos, Greece	
4×200m SF relay	5:49.86	Valeriia Baranovskaya (1:26.38); Vlada Markina (1:30.59); Mariia Patlasova (1:26.41); Ekaterina Mikhailushkina (1:26.48)	Russia	7 July 2021	World Championships	Tomsk, Russia	

Legend: # – Record awaiting ratification by CMAS;
Records not set in finals: h – heat; r – relay 1st leg; rh – relay heat 1st leg; so – swim-off

=== Mixed ===
Event	Time	Name	Nationality	Date	Meet	Location	Ref
4×100 m SB relay	2:41.82	Aleksei Fedkin (41.85); Iana Martynova (47.39); Iaroslav Peshkov (34.46); Diana Sliseva (38.12)	CMAS	26 June 2026	World Championships	Incheon, South Korea	
4×100 m BF relay	2:55.34	Péter Holoda (41.83); Kelen Cséplő (42.12); Krisztina Varga (46.55); Petra Senánszky (44.84)	Hungary	6 July 2021	World Championships	Tomsk, Russia	

Legend: # – Record awaiting ratification by CMAS;
Records not set in finals: h – heat

=== Junior – boys ===
Event	Time	Name	Nationality	Date	Meet	Location	Ref
50m SF	15.41	Egor Kachmashev	Russia	1 August 2019	World Junior Championships	Sharm El Sheikh, Egypt	
100m SF	34.36	Egor Kachmashev	Russia	27 June 2019	European Championships	Ioannina, Greece	
200m SF	1:20.05	Egor Kachmashev	Russia	28 June 2019	European Championships	Ioannina, Greece	
400m SF	2:56.07	Nándor Kiss	Hungary	20 July 2022	World Championships	Cali, Colombia	
800m SF	6:13.53	Nándor Kiss	Hungary	26 February 2022	World Cup 2022	Eger, Hungary	
1500m SF	12:22.74	Ádám Bukor	Slovakia	7 July 2016	World Junior Championships	Annemasse, France	
50m BF	18.79	Aleksey Fedkin	Russia	1 August 2018	European Junior Championships	Istanbul, Turkey	
100m BF	41.56	Aleksey Fedkin	Russia	30 July 2018	European Junior Championships	Istanbul, Turkey	
200m BF	1:34.03	Aleksey Fedkin	Russia	31 July 2018	European Junior Championships	Istanbul, Turkey	
400m BF	3:26.69	Aleksey Fedkin	Russia	1 August 2018	European Junior Championships	Istanbul, Turkey	
50m AP	14.19	Niklas Loßner	Germany	14 May 2023	German Championships	Leipzig, Germany	
100m IM	31.84	Euvgeni Skorzhenko	Russia	4 September 2001	European Championships	Eger, Hungary	
200m IM	1:15.33	Qin Kangyu	China	26 June 2026	World Championships	Incheon, South Korea	
400m IM	2:48.25	Denys Grubnik	Ukraine	24 August 2009	World Championships	Saint Petersburg, Russia	
4×50m SF relay	1:04.48	Ioannis Bainaktaris (16.89); Konstantinos Tsiaousis (18.13); Ioannis Armatas (14.63); Angelos Korompylis (14.83)	Greece	10 June 2026	European Junior Championships	Chios, Greece	
4×100m SF relay	2:24.01	Viacheslav Popov (36.69); Alexander Semenenko (36.91); Dmitri Zhurman (36.10); Roman Giniyatulin (34.31)	Russia	29 June 2014	World Junior Championships	Chania, Greece	
4×200m SF relay	5:34.39	Vadim Nekrasov (1:26.08); Denis Arshanov (1:23.96); Viacheslav Popov (1:22.07); Dmitri Zhurman (1:22.28)	Russia	27 June 2014	World Junior Championships	Chania, Greece	

Legend: # – Record awaiting ratification by CMAS;
Records not set in finals: h – heat; r – relay 1st leg; rh – relay heat 1st leg; so – swim-off

=== Junior – girls ===
Event	Time		Name	Nationality	Date	Meet	Location	Ref
50m SF	17.42		Maria Iliaki	Greece	29 June 2024	European Junior Championships	Klaipėda, Lithuania	
100m SF	38.28		Ekaterina Mikhailushkina	Russia	16 July 2018	World Championships	Belgrade, Serbia	
200m SF	1:26.39		Ekaterina Mikhailushkina	Russia	5 July 2017	European Championships	Wrocław, Poland	
400m SF	3:12.27		Anna Yakovleva	Ukraine	11 August 2025	World Games	Chengdu, China	
800m SF	6:46.98		Elizaveta Kupressova	CMAS	16 February 2025	Russian Cup	Saratov, Russia	
1500m SF	13:23.86		Anna Leonardi	Italy	17 July 2025	European Championships	Olsztyn, Poland	
50m BF	21.48	=	Zoé Turucz	Hungary	28 June 2024	European Junior Championships	Klaipėda, Lithuania	
50m BF	21.48	=	Polina Ivanushkina	CMAS	23 June 2025	World Junior Championships	Chios, Greece	
100m BF	47.16		Maria Patlasova	Russia	6 July 2016	World Junior Championships	Annemasse, France	
200m BF	1:42.46		Maria Patlasova	Russia	7 July 2016	World Junior Championships	Annemasse, France	
400m BF	3:46.00		Arina Pantina	Russia	17 June 2021	World Junior Championships	Lignano Sabbiadoro, Italy	
50m AP	15.71		Yao Huali	China	2 November 2023	China's Student (Youth) Games	Nanning, China	
100m IM	35.05		Yao Huali	China	26 November 2023	Asian Championships	Phuket, Thailand	
200m IM	1:20.84		Kseniia Saprykina	CMAS	21 June 2025	World Junior Championships	Chios, Greece	
400m IM	2:56.87		Chen Sijia	China	25 June 2016	World Championships	Volos, Greece	
4×50m SF relay	1:12.63		Maiia Horenok (18.57); Anna Yakovleva (17.85); Veronika Vorobiova (18.87); Yelyzaveta Hrechykhina (17.34)	Ukraine	23 June 2025	World Junior Championships	Chios, Greece	
4×100m SF relay	2:40.52		Anastasia Zviagina (40.82); Tatiana Prichinina (41.47); Elena Lopatina (39.49); Ekaterina Mikhailushkina (38.74)	Russia	2 August 2018	European Junior Championships	Istanbul, Turkey	
4×200m SF relay	6:04.05		Anastasia Zviagina (1:31.72); Tatiana Prichinina (1:34.15); Elena Lopatina (1:30.60); Ekaterina Mikhailushkina (1:27.58)	Russia	1 August 2018	European Junior Championships	Istanbul, Turkey	

Legend: # – Record awaiting ratification by CMAS;
Records not set in finals: h – heat; r – relay 1st leg; rh – relay heat 1st leg; so – swim-off

=== Junior – mixed ===
Event	Time	Name	Nationality	Date	Meet	Location	Ref
4×100 m SB relay	2:46.60	Vasileios Giannitsakis (43.35); Lydia Panteloglou (48.32); Athanasios Michailidis (36.45); Maria Iliaki (38.48)	Greece	30 June 2024	European Junior Championships	Klaipėda, Lithuania	
4×100 m BF relay	3:02.44	Danila Inbulaev (43.41); Aleksey Fedkin (41.00); Elizaveta Maximenko (49.61); Iana Martynova (48.42)	Russia	30 July 2018	European Junior Championships	Istanbul, Turkey	

Legend: # – Record awaiting ratification by CMAS;
Records not set in finals: h – heat; so – swim-off

== See also ==
- List of European records in finswimming
