= Finswimming at the 2009 World Games – Women's 4 x 100 m surface relay =

Finswimming - men's 4 x 100 m surface relay at the World Games
- Venue: Kaohsiung Swimming Pool
- Date: 23 July 2009
- Competitors: 24 from 6 nations

Medalists
1st place, gold medalist(s)		Li Jing; Liang Yaoyue; Xu Yichuan; Zhu Baozhen
2nd place, silver medalist(s)		Choi Sae-rom; Jang Ye-sol; Jeon Ah-ram; Kim Hyeon-jin
3rd place, bronze medalist(s)		Valeriya Baranovskaya; Medeya Dzhavakhishvili; Yana Kasimova; Vasilisa Kravchuk

The women's 4 x 100 m surface relay event in finswimming at the 2009 World Games took place on 23 July 2009 at the Kaohsiung Swimming Pool in Kaohsiung, Taiwan.

== Competition format ==
A total of 6 teams entered the competition. Only final was held.

== Results ==
Rank	Country	Team	Time	Note
1st place, gold medalist(s)	China	Li Jing; Liang Yaoyue; Xu Yichuan; Zhu Baozhen	2:37.81	WR
2nd place, silver medalist(s)	South Korea	Choi Sae-rom; Jang Ye-sol; Jeon Ah-ram; Kim Hyeon-jin	2:41.93	
3rd place, bronze medalist(s)	Russia	Valeriya Baranovskaya; Medeya Dzhavakhishvili; Yana Kasimova; Vasilisa Kravchuk	2:44.82	
4	Ukraine	Kateryna Dyelova; Olga Shlyakhovska; Olga Godovana; Margaryta Artiushenko	2:46.06	
5	Hungary	Lilla Szekely; Hajnalka Debreczeni; Melinda Wirtz; Csilla Karolyi	2:47.61	
6	Germany	Tina Hirschfeldt; Nicole Matthes; Sandra Pilz; Franziska Schreiber	2:49.45	
