= 2013 Finswimming World Championships =

International competition in Kazan, Russia

17th Finswimming World Championships (part of 2nd CMAS Games)
- Host city: Kazan, Russia
- Date: 30 July – 6 August 2013
- Venue: Burevestnik swimming pool
- Nations: 34
- Events: 18 (men), 18 (women)

The 17th Finswimming World Championships were held between 05–12 August 2013 in Kazan, Russia, at the Burevestnik swimming pool as part of the CMAS Games 2013.

== Schedule ==
1	Number of finals
●	Other competitions

August 2013	05 Mon	06 Tue	07 Wed	08 Thu	09 Fri	10 Sat	11 Sun	12 Mon	Gold medals
Pool events	4	7	5	6	8				30
Long distance events						2	2	2	6
Total gold medals	4	7	5	6	8	2	2	2	36
Cumulative total	4	11	16	22	30	32	34	36	

== Medal table ==
* Host nation

* Host nation (Russia)

Rank	Nation	Gold	Silver	Bronze	Total
1	Russia*	13	9	7	29
2	China	7	4	1	12
3	Ukraine	3	8	3	14
4	Colombia	3	1	3	7
4	Hungary	3	1	3	7
6	Germany	2	2	2	6
7	Italy	1	2	3	6
8	Greece	1	1	2	4
9	Czech Republic	1	0	1	2
10	South Korea	0	3	5	8
11	Belarus	0	2	0	2
12	France	0	1	2	3
13	Estonia	0	0	2	2
14	Venezuela	0	0	1	1
Totals (14 entries)		34	34	35	103

== Pool events ==
The pool part of the championships was held from 5 to 9 August 2013 at the Burevestnik swimming pool in Kazan, Russia.

=== Schedule ===
The finswimming competition featured races in a long course (50 m) pool in 30 events (15 for males, 15 for females; 13 individual events and 2 relays for each gender).

The evening session schedule for the 2013 Finswimming Championships:

Date	Monday; 5 August 2013	Tuesday; 6 August 2013	Wednesday; 7 August 2013	Thursday; 8 August 2013	Friday; 9 August 2013
E v e n t s	Women's 50m apnea Men's 100m immersion Women's 400m surface Men's 4 × 200 m relay	Men's 800m immersion direct final on morning Men's 50m surface Men's 50m bifins Men's 1500m surface Women's 200m surface Women's 200m bifins Men's 400m surface	Women's 800m surface Women's 100m immersion Men's 100m surface Men's 100m bifins Men's 400m immersion	Men's 50m apnea Men's 800m surface Women's 100m surface Women's 100m bifins Women's 400m immersion Women's 4 × 200 m relay	Women's 800m immersion direct final on morning Women's 50m surface Women's 50m bifins Women's 1500m surface Men's 200m surface Men's 200m bifins Women's 4 × 100 m relay Men's 4 × 100 m relay

Note: every distances have preliminary heats and finals, but only 800m immersion is on direct final on morning sessions.

=== Medal table ===
Rank	Nation	Gold	Silver	Bronze	Total
1	Russia	11	8	6	25
2	China	7	4	1	12
3	Colombia	3	1	3	7
3	Hungary	3	1	3	7
5	Ukraine	2	7	2	11
6	Germany	2	1	2	5
7	Greece	1	1	2	4
8	Czech Republic	1	0	1	2
9	South Korea	0	3	5	8
10	Italy	0	2	2	4
11	Belarus	0	2	0	2
12	Estonia	0	0	2	2
12	France	0	0	2	2
14	Venezuela	0	0	1	1
Totals (14 entries)		30	30	32	92

=== Men's events ===
Event	Gold		Silver		Bronze	
50 m surface	Mauricio Fernandez; Colombia	15.17; WR	Pavel Kabanov; Russia	15.30	Loukas Karetzopoulos; Greece	15.49
100 m surface	Loukas Karetzopoulos; Greece	34.54	William Paul Baldwin; Greece	35.07	Cesare Fumarola; Italy	35.14
200 m surface	Juan Fernando Ocampo; Colombia	1:20.61	Dmitriy Kokorev; Russia	1:21.14	Andrea Nava; Italy	1:21.15
400 m surface	Evgeny Smirnov; Russia	2:56.93; WR	Max Lauschus; Germany	2:58.73	Denes Kanyo; Hungary	2:58.85
800 m surface	Max Lauschus; Germany	6:19.81	Oleksandr Odynokov; Ukraine	6:19.97	Alexey Shafigulin; Russia	6:23.80
1500 m surface	Alexey Shafigulin; Russia	12:22.34	Oleksandr Odynokov; Ukraine	12:36.12	Dmitriy Lobchenko; Russia	12:36.19
50 m bifins	Jakub Jarolím; Czech Republic	19.08	Viktor Kondratyev; Russia	19.13	Aziz Figarella; Venezuela	19.27
100 m bifins	Sergey Seleznev; Russia	42.61; WR	Dmitry Gavrilov; Belarus	42.80	Jakub Jarolím; Czech Republic	42.87
200 m bifins	Gergely Kosina; Hungary	1:36.07; WJR	Dmitry Gavrilov; Belarus	1:36.60	Aleksandr Ivanets; Russia	1:37.49
50 m apnea	Pavel Kabanov; Russia	14.05	Kwanho Lee; South Korea	14.18	Mauricio Fernandez; Colombia; Loukas Karetzopoulos; Greece	14.28
100 m immersion	Pavel Kabanov; Russia	31.60	Mauricio Fernandez; Colombia	31.96	Kwanho Lee; South Korea	32.23
400 m immersion	Cheng Chi; China	2:43.37	Denis Grubnik; Ukraine	2:44.03	Christoph Oefner; Germany	2:47.46
800 m immersion	Zhenbo Tong; China	5:49.60	Denis Grubnik; Ukraine	5:51.20	Benjamin Hamelin; France	5:57.00
4×100 m freestyle relay	Russia; Pavel Kabanov (34.90); Alexey Kazantsev (34.91); Andrey Barabash (34.68); Dmitry Kokorev (34.59)	2:19.08; WR	Italy; Cesare Fumarola (35.28); Stefano Figini (34.89); Kevin Zanardi (35.68); Andrea Nava (33.95)	2:19.80	Colombia; Mauricio Fernandez (35.81); Juan Rodrigez Lopez (35.33); Juan Rodriguez Gonzalez (34.63); Romero Leonidas Juan Pablo (34.74)	2:20.51
4×200 m freestyle relay	Germany; Max Lauschus (1:21.03); Florian Kritzler (1:21.21); Christoph Oefner (1:21:91); Jan Malkowski (1:22.18)	5:26.33; WR	Italy; Andrea Nava (1:21.12); Cesare Fumarola (1:22.66); Kevin Zanardi (1:23.72); Stefano Figini (1:20.17)	5:27.75	Colombia; Juan Gonzalez Rodriguez (1:23.48); Jimenez Alexander (1:24.29); Romero Leonidas Juan Pablo (1:23.83); Juan Ocampo (1:19.57)	5:31.17

=== Women's events ===
Event	Gold		Silver		Bronze	
50 m surface	Huanshan Xu; China	17.58	Yesol Jang; South Korea	17.67	Ksenia Belomestinova; Estonia; Patricia Vogel; Germany	18.09
100 m surface	Grace Fernandez; Colombia	39.77	Vera Ilyushina; Russia	39.95	Yesol Jang; South Korea	40.24
200 m surface	Vasilisa Kravchuk; Russia	1:28.38	Valeria Baranovskaya; Russia	1:29.51	Bo Kyung Kim; South Korea	1:30.90
400 m surface	Vasilisa Kravchuk; Russia	3:14.32	Sun Yiting; China	3:16.06	Iana Trofymets; Ukraine	3:17.50
800 m surface	Sun Yiting; China	6:50.67	Iana Trofymets; Ukraine	6:51.99	Nadezhda Borisova; Russia	6:58.68
1500 m surface	Iana Trofymets; Ukraine	13:12.73	Nadezhda Borisova; Russia	13:19.95	Jiao Liu; China	13:29.13
50 m bifins	Petra Senánszky; Hungary	21.83; WR	Irina Vodneva; Russia	22.40	Elizaveta Melnikova; Russia	22.49
100 m bifins	Petra Senánszky; Hungary	47.27; WR	Irina Vodneva; Russia	48.14	Krisztina Varga; Hungary	48.90
200 m bifins	Vitalina Simonova; Russia	1:43.43; WR	Petra Senánszky; Hungary	1:43.79	Krisztina Varga; Hungary	1:46.35
50 m apnea	Kateryna Dyelova; Ukraine	16.31	Yesol Jang; South Korea	16.32	Camille Heitz; France	16.43
100 m immersion	Huanshan Xu; China	35.41	Yaqi Lin; China	37.06	Kateryna Dyelova; Ukraine	37.36
400 m immersion	Sun Yiting; China	3:01.99	Jiao Liu; China	3:04.83	Jelena Smirnova; Estonia	3:07.98
800 m immersion	Jiao Liu; China	6:20.70	Sun Yiting; China	6:26.15	Vera Yarovitskaya; Russia	6:31.67
4×100 m freestyle relay	Russia; Vasilisa Kravchuk (39.66); Valeria Baranovskaya (39.54); Elena Kononova (40.34); Vera Ilyushina (39.92)	2:38.46	Ukraine; Anastasia Antoniak (40.39); Margaryta Artiushenko (40.36); Olga Shliakhovska (40.42); Kateryna Dyelova (38.65)	2:39.82	South Korea; Yesol Jang (40.75); Mun Hyeon Yim (41.98); Gain Kim (39.47); Bo Kyung Kim (39.43)	2:41.63
4×200 m freestyle relay	Russia; Valeria Baranovskaya (1:28.33); WR; Elena Kononova (1:31.87); Vera Ilyushina (1:29.39); Vasilisa Kravchuk (1:29.59)	5:59.12; WR	Ukraine; Anastasia Antoniak (1:30.74); Olga Shliakhovska (1:31.39); Olga Godovana (1:32.91); Yana Trofimez (1:32.29)	6:07.33	South Korea; Gain Kim (1:34.94); Mun Hyeon Yim (1:34.38); Yesol Jang (1:33.2.); Bo Kyung Kim (1:30.79)	6:13.33
