= 2026 Finswimming World Championships =

2026 CMAS World Championship Finswimming Indoor
- Venue: Munhak Park Tae-Hwan Aquatics Center
- Location: Incheon, South Korea
- Dates: 24–28 June

The 2026 Finswimming World Championships Indoor were held in Incheon, South Korea from 24 to 28 June 2026.

== Medal overview ==
=== Men's events ===
Event	Gold		Silver		Bronze	
50 m surface	Hwang Gyu-jin; South Korea	15.03; AS	Park Tae-ho; South Korea	15.31	Mauricio Fernández; Colombia	15.36
100 m surface	Kim Chan-young; South Korea	34.55; AS	Colas Zugmeyer; France	35.35	Marek Leipold; Germany	35.40
200 m surface	Nándor Kiss; Hungary	1:19.57	Cristian Degli Esposti; Italy	1:20.65	David Akentev; CMAS	1:20.82
400 m surface	Nándor Kiss; Hungary	2:52.86	Megyer Kovács; Hungary	2:54.64	Antonin Lebeau; France	3:00.49
800 m surface	Nándor Kiss; Hungary	6:16.74	Lee Seong; South Korea	6:20.63	Antonin Lebeau; France	6:22.00
1500 m surface	Lee Seong; South Korea	12:16.07; AS	Megyer Kovács; Hungary	12:20.13	Iaroslav Peshkov; CMAS	12:22.56
50 m bi-fins	Szebasztián Szabó; Hungary	18.27	Szymon Kropidłowski; Poland	18.75	Arsenii Desiatov; CMAS	19.00
100 m bi-fins	Szymon Kropidłowski; Poland	40.87	Alexandr Nazarchuk; CMAS	41.21	Szebasztián Szabó; Hungary	41.22
200 m bi-fins	Kelen Cséplő; Hungary	1:33.22	Aleksei Fedkin; CMAS	1:33.78	Tymofii Zosym; Ukraine	1:34.92
400 m bi-fins	Aleksei Fedkin; CMAS	3:27.85	Kaan Efe Kaya; Turkey	3:29.06	Artem Kornieiev; Ukraine	3:29.81
50 m apnea	Lee Kwan-ho; South Korea	13.87	Shin Myeong-jun; South Korea	13.93	Nguyễn Thành Lộc; Vietnam	14.22
100 m immersion	Shin Myeong-jun; South Korea	30.70; WR	Guan Hanzhi; China	31.94	Qin Kangyu; China	32.06
200 m immersion	Guan Hanzhi; China	1:11.89; AS	Oleksii Zakharov; Ukraine	1:13.63	Shin Myeong-jun; South Korea	1:13.75
400 m immersion	Guan Hanzhi; China	2:43.94	Oleksii Zakharov; Ukraine	2:46.56	Yoon Young-joong; South Korea	2:47.30
4 × 50 m surface relay	South Korea; Hwang Gyu-jin (15.20); Kim Chan-young (14.53); Kwon Nam-ho (14.73); Park Tae-ho (15.49)	59.95; AS	Colombia; Juan Rodríguez (16.32); Juan Duque (15.00); Juan Ocampo (14.99); Mauricio Fernández (14.76); Nicolás Durán^{[a]}	1:01.07	France; Tom Durager (15.78); Ewen Hamon (15.68); Gabryel Allain (15.24); Colas Zugmeyer (15.43)	1:02.13
4 × 100 m surface relay	South Korea; Song Ja-euk (35.51); Cha Jong-hwan (36.20); Kwon Nam-ho (35.09); Kim Chan-young (33.84)	2:20.64	CMAS; Nikita Gaivak (35.61); Matvey Solovyov (35.40); Ratmir Markovin (34.98); Iaroslav Peshkov (34.73); Kirill Parinov^{[a]}	2:20.72	Ukraine; Serhii Smishchenko (36.30); Vitalii Hora (35.64); Davyd Yelisieiev (35.56); Oleksii Zakharov (33.95)	2:21.45
4 × 200 m surface relay	Hungary; Ádám Bukor (1:22.23); Alex Mozsár (1:23.36); Megyer Kovács (1:19.82); Nándor Kiss (1:19.48)	5:24.89	CMAS; David Akentev (1:22.63); Aleksandr Khudyshkin (1:21.81); Vladislav Markov (1:24.16); Iaroslav Peshkov (1:18.67); Kirill Parinov^{[a]} Ratmir Markovin^{[a]}	5:27.27	South Korea; Park Hee-mang (1:23.88); Lee Seong (1:23.33); Ha Seung-woo (1:20.97); Jang Hyoung-ho (1:21.36)	5:29.54

^{a} Swimmers who participated in the heats only and received medals.

=== Women's events ===
Event	Gold		Silver		Bronze	
50 m surface	Diana Sliseva; CMAS	17.36; ER	Xie Wenmin; China	17.49	Hu Yaoyao; China	17.56
100 m surface	Diana Sliseva; CMAS	38.03	Seo Ui-jin; South Korea	38.92	Hu Yaoyao; China	38.97
200 m surface	Ekaterina Mikhaylushkina; CMAS	1:28.63	Anna Yakovleva; Ukraine	1:29.72	Elizaveta Kupressova; CMAS	1:30.14
400 m surface	Elizaveta Kupressova; CMAS	3:12.16	Anna Yakovleva; Ukraine	3:14.67	Sofiia Hrechko; Ukraine	3:16.18
800 m surface	Sofiia Hrechko; Ukraine	6:51.70	Elizaveta Kupressova; CMAS	6:52.52	Anna Mishustina; CMAS	6:54.16
1500 m surface	Anna Mishustina; CMAS	13:15.87	Anna Leonardi; Italy	13:31.57	Karina Beliaeva; CMAS	13:39.30
50 m bi-fins	Petra Senánszky; Hungary	20.97	Viola Magoga; Italy	21.86	Chiu Yi-chen; Chinese Taipei	21.87
100 m bi-fins	Anna Jadviga Varnyu; Hungary	48.23	Sofiya Lamakh; Ukraine	48.41	Iana Martynova; CMAS	48.55
200 m bi-fins	Arina Pantina; CMAS	1:44.56	Anna Jadviga Varnyu; Hungary	1:45.05	He Pin-li; Chinese Taipei	1:46.34
400 m bi-fins	Arina Pantina; CMAS	3:42.86; WR	Anna Jadviga Varnyu; Hungary	3:44.97	Sofiya Lamakh; Ukraine	3:46.97
50 m apnea	Paula Aguirre; Colombia	16.05	Diana Sliseva; CMAS	16.09	Hu Yaoyao; China	16.19
100 m immersion	Yao Huali; China	34.88	Hu Yaoyao; China	36.36	Diana Sliseva; CMAS	36.40
200 m immersion	Yao Huali; China	1:20.19	Kseniia Saprykina; CMAS	1:22.60	Baek Seo-hyun; South Korea	1:24.46
400 m immersion	Kseniia Saprykina; CMAS	2:56.71; ER	Yao Huali; China	2:58.16	Baek Seo-hyun; South Korea	3:04.85
4 × 50 m surface relay	CMAS; Diana Sliseva (17.39); Valeriia Proshina (16.92); Alina Nalbandian (17.44); Ekaterina Mikhaylushkina (17.37); Vlada Markina^{[b]} Elizaveta Kupressova^{[b]}	1:09.12; ER	China; Xie Wenmin (17.65); Shu Chengjing (17.56); Yao Huali (17.19); Hu Yaoyao (16.99)	1:09.39	Colombia; Grace Fernández (18.14); Diana Moreno (17.49); Nikol Ortega (16.94); Paula Aguirre (17.25)	1:09.82
4 × 100 m surface relay	CMAS; Ekaterina Mikhaylushkina (39.58); Valeriia Proshina (39.30); Alina Nalbandian (39.24); Diana Sliseva (37.99); Karina Beliaeva^{[b]} Elizaveta Kupressova^{[b]}	2:36.11	South Korea; Lee Yu-min (39.27); Gil Da-seul (40.13); Kim Min-jeong (38.58); Seo Ui-jin (38.43)	2:36.41	Ukraine; Anna Yakovleva (39.67); Viktoriia Uvarova (40.13); Sofiia Hrechko (38.55); Anastasiia Makarenko (38.88)	2:37.23
4 × 200 m surface relay	China; Wang Kaili (1:31.43); Shu Chengjing (1:32.39); Xu Yichuan (1:30.43); Yao Huali (1:33.18)	6:07.43	Germany; Lara Gawenda (1:33.72); Nina Kohler (1:33.70); Franca Richter (1:33.84); Michèle Rütze (1:33.08)	6:14.34	Greece; Ifigeneia Teliousi (1:31.25); Eleni Kalfidou (1:36.13); Eirin Deligianni (1:33.42); Anna Filoglou (1:34.08)	6:14.88

^{b} Swimmers who participated in the heats only and received medals.

=== Mixed events ===
Event	Gold		Silver		Bronze	
4 × 100 m bi-fins-surface relay	CMAS; Aleksei Fedkin (41.85); Iana Martynova (47.39); Iaroslav Peshkov (34.46); Diana Sliseva (38.12); Arsenii Desiatov^{[c]} Matvey Solovyov^{[c]} Vlada Markina^{[c]}	2:41.82; WR	Poland; Szymon Kropidłowski (40.76); Antonina Dudek (47.64); Filip Nowak (35.70); Julia Małachowska (38.42)	2:42.52	Germany; Niklas Loßner (42.49); Lara Gawenda (47.93); Marek Leipold (33.60); Nadja Barthel (39.77); Lilly Placzek^{[c]}	2:43.79
4 × 100 m bi-fins relay	Hungary; Szebasztián Szabó (41.73); Anna Jadviga Varnyu (48.35); Kelen Cséplő (40.40); Petra Senánszky (45.53); Sára Suba^{[c]}	2:56.01	CMAS; Alexandr Nazarchuk (41.63); Arina Pantina (47.39); Aleksei Fedkin (41.13); Iana Martynova (47.48)	2:57.63	Ukraine; Tymofii Zosym (43.19); Yevheniia Tymoshenko (47.87); Artur Artamonov (41.25); Sofiya Lamakh (47.17)	2:59.48

^{c} Swimmers who participated in the heats only and received medals.

== Medal table ==
* Host nation (South Korea)

Rank	Nation	Gold	Silver	Bronze	Total
1	CMAS	12	8	8	28
2	Hungary	9	4	1	14
3	South Korea*	7	5	5	17
4	China	5	5	4	14
5	Ukraine	1	5	7	13
6	Poland	1	2	0	3
7	Colombia	1	1	2	4
8	Italy	0	3	0	3
9	France	0	1	3	4
10	Germany	0	1	2	3
11	Turkey	0	1	0	1
12	Chinese Taipei	0	0	2	2
13	Greece	0	0	1	1
13	Vietnam	0	0	1	1
Totals (14 entries)		36	36	36	108
