= 2018 Finswimming World Championships =

International competition in Belgrade, Serbia

20th Finswimming World Championships
- Venue: Sports Center Milan Gale Muškatirović; Ada Ciganlija Lake
- Location: Belgrade, Serbia
- Dates: 16–20 July

The 20th Finswimming World Championships were held in Belgrade, Serbia at the Sports Center Milan Gale Muškatirović and at Ada Ciganlija Lake from 16 to 20 July 2018.

== Medal overview ==
=== Men's events ===
Event	Gold		Silver		Bronze	
50 m surface	Loukas Karetzopoulos (GRE)	15.54	Aleksey Kazantsev (RUS)	15.77	Pavel Kabanov (RUS)	15.85
100 m surface	Aliaksandr Biazmen (BLR)	35.03	Dmitrii Zhurman (RUS)	35.34	Malte Striegler (GER)	35.54
200 m surface	Dmitrii Zhurman (RUS)	1:21.22	Aliaksandr Biazmen (BLR)	1:21.24	Juan Ocampo (COL)	1:21.26
400 m surface	Ádám Bukor (HUN)	2:58.22	Stefano Figini (ITA)	3:00.45	Oleksii Zakharov (UKR)	3:00.70
800 m surface	Oleksii Zakharov (UKR)	6:19.39	Ádám Bukor (HUN)	6:20.72	Lưu Nguyễn Đức Tâm (VIE)	6:29.12
1500 m surface	Oleksandr Odynokov (UKR)	12:20.64	Ádám Bukor (HUN)	12:22.76	Alexey Shafigulin (RUS)	12:23.35
50 m bi-fins	Christos Bonias (GRE)	18.85	Aleksey Fedkin (RUS)	19.05	Danylo Kolodiazhnyi (UKR)	19.33
100 m bi-fins	Danylo Kolodiazhnyi (UKR)	41.79	Aleksey Fedkin (RUS)	41.93	Dzmitry Gavrilov (BLR)	42.15
200 m bi-fins	Yevgen Stepanchuk (UKR)	1:35.74	Dmitriy Kurako (RUS)	1:36.07	Lev Shtraikh (RUS)	1:36.12
400 m bi-fins	Dmitriy Kurako (RUS)	3:29.36 WR	Vladimir Sidorov (RUS)	3:29.58	Maxence Pazdur (FRA)	3:34.91
50 m apnea	Vladimir Zhuravlev (RUS)	14.24	Pavel Kabanov (RUS)	14.31	Lee Kwan-ho (KOR)	14.35
100 m immersion	Lee Kwan-ho (KOR)	32.16	Kim Tae-kyun (KOR)	32.17	Tong Zhenbo (CHN)	32.35
400 m immersion	Tong Zhenbo (CHN)	2:44.02	Denis Grubnik (UKR)	2:48.37	Riccardo Campana (ITA)	2:49.09
4 × 100 m surface relay	Russia; Pavel Kabanov (36.67); Viacheslav Noskov (35.05); Vladimir Zhuravlev (34.81); Dmitrii Zhurman (34.44); Aleksey Kazantsev^{[a]} Nikolay Reznikov^{[a]}	2:20.97	South Korea; Lee Dong-jin (35.88); Jang Seong-hyeok (36.28); Kwon Nam-ho (35.02); You Gyeong-heon (34.73)	2:21.91	Italy; Stefano Figini (36.13); Tommaso Crisci (35.71); Stefano Konjedic (36.20); Cesare Fumarola (35.05); Kevin Zanardi^{[a]}	2:23.09
4 × 200 m surface relay	Russia; Viacheslav Noskov (1:22.21); Alexey Shafigulin (1:22.42); Nikolay Reznikov (1:23.03); Dmitrii Zhurman (1:20.35); Evgeny Smirnov^{[a]} Denis Arshanov^{[a]}	5:28.01	Germany; Max Poschart (1:23.75); Jan Malkowski (1:22.87); Sidney Zeuner (1:22.28); Malte Striegler (1:22.03); Luis Buttner^{[a]}	5:30.93	Hungary; Dénes Kanyó (1:24.71); Kornél Gruber (1:24.13); Alex Mozsár (1:22.31); Ádám Bukor (1:20.23); Dávid Dimák^{[a]} Matthew Hamlin^{[a]}	5:31.38
6 km open water	Oleksii Zakharov (UKR)	56:53:18	Marios Armoutsis (GRE)	56:55.95	Davide De Ceglie (ITA)	57:07.47

^{a} Swimmers who participated in the heats only and received medals.

=== Women's events ===
Event	Gold		Silver		Bronze	
50 m surface	Paula Aguirre (COL)	17.52	Grace Fernández (COL)	17.84	Kim Ga-in (KOR)	18.00
100 m surface	Ekaterina Mikhailushkina (RUS)	38.28 ER	Paula Aguirre (COL)	38.87	Grace Fernández (COL)	38.95
200 m surface	Ekaterina Mikhailushkina (RUS)	1:27.39	Anastasia Antoniak (UKR)	1:29.91	Alina Nalbandian (RUS)	1:30.72
400 m surface	Sun Yiting (CHN)	3:12.10 WR	Elena Lopatina (RUS)	3:12.86 ER	Ekaterina Mikhailushkina (RUS)	3:13.14
800 m surface	Sun Yiting (CHN)	6:50.55	Yevheniia Olieinikova (UKR)	6:58.26	Chen Sijia (CHN)	6:58.78
1500 m surface	Terhi Ikonen (FIN)	13:20.96	Yevheniia Olieinikova (UKR)	13:27.62	Elena Poschart (GER)	13:39.56
50 m bi-fins	Petra Senánszky (HUN)	21.13	Choi Min-ji (KOR)	21.89	Valeriia Bodnia (RUS) Im Min-ji (KOR)	21.93
100 m bi-fins	Petra Senánszky (HUN)	46.33	Maria Patlasova (RUS)	47.04	Vitalina Simonova (RUS)	47.12
200 m bi-fins	Maria Patlasova (RUS)	1:43.39	Vitalina Simonova (RUS)	1:43.90	Krisztina Varga (HUN)	1:44.55
400 m bi-fins	Maria Patlasova (RUS)	3:44.92 WR	Krisztina Varga (HUN)	3:45.92	Zuzana Hrašková (SVK)	3:48.91
50 m apnea	Shu Chengjing (CHN)	15.90	Yoon Mi-ri (KOR)	16.12	Lin Yaki (CHN)	16.13
100 m immersion	Xin Peiyao (CHN) Lin Yaqi (CHN)	35.86	Not awarded		Lidia Stadnik (RUS)	36.58
400 m immersion	Sun Yiting (CHN)	2:59.24	Chen Sijia (CHN)	3:00.33	Shin Jin-hee (KOR)	3:03.76
4 × 100 m surface relay	Russia; Ekaterina Mikhailushkina (38.27) ER; Valeria Baranovskaya (38.92); Elena Lopatina (39.13); Alina Nalbandian (38.43); Lidia Stadnik^{[b]}	2:34.75	China; Shu Chengjing (39.16); Liu Simin (39.03); Xin Peiyao (39.07); Xu Yichuan (38.27)	2:35.53	Colombia; Grace Fernández (39.54); Mercedes Ruiz (40.88); Viviana Retamozo (39.89); Paula Aguirre (39.85)	2:40.16
4 × 200 m surface relay	Russia; Valeria Baranovskaya (1:27.11); Elena Lopatina (1:29.75); Alina Nalbandian (1:30.73); Ekaterina Mikhailushkina (1:29.26); Alena Parshina^{[b]}	5:56.85	China; Liu Yushan (1:32.54); Xu Yichuan (1:29.79); Chen Sijia (1:34.19); Sun Yiting (1:31.52)	6:08.04	Ukraine; Yelyzaveta Vakareva (1:31.34); Kristina Musienko (1:34.90); Yana Trofymets (1:34.24); Anastasia Antoniak (1:29.75); Yevheniia Olieinikova^{[b]}	6:10.23
6 km open water	Evgenia Kozyreva (RUS)	59:00:46	Anastasia Mulkova (RUS)	59:03.08	Anastasia Politou (GRE)	59:15.06

^{b} Swimmers who participated in the heats only and received medals.

=== Mixed events ===
Event	Gold		Silver		Bronze	
4×50 m surface relay	South Korea; Lee Dong-jin (15.44); Kim Ga-in (17.28); Kwon Nam-ho (14.93); Kim Min-jeong (17.05)	1:04.70	Italy; Erica Barbon (17.70); Tommaso Crisci (14.84); Silvia Baroncini (18.13); Cesare Fumarola (14.87)	1:05.54	Russia; Aleksey Kazantsev (15.73); Lidia Stadnik (17.71); Ekaterina Mikhailushkina (17.01); Pavel Kabanov (15.10); Elizaveta Borisova^{[c]}	1:05.55
4 × 100 m bi-fins relay	Russia; Lev Shtraikh (42.80); Aleksey Fedkin (41.58); Maria Patlasova (46.76); Vitalina Simonova (46.90); Vladimir Sidorov^{[c]} Valeriia Bodina^{[c]}	2:58.04 WR	Ukraine; Iryna Pikiner (48.04); Artur Artamonov (42.10); Margarita Smirnova (48.69); Danylo Kolodiazhnyi (41.79); Anastasiia Maliavina^{[c]} Yelyzaveta Mazur^{[c]} Oleg Kuznetsov^{[c]} Yevgen Stepanchuk^{[c]}	3:00.62	Hungary; Bence Stadler (44.85); Matthew Hamlin (45.69); Krisztina Varga (46.97); Petra Senánszky (46.10)	3:03.61
4×2 km open water relay	Ukraine; Oleksandr Odynokov (18:24.41); Kristina Musienko (20:16.19); Ievheniia Olieinikova (18:25.24); Oleksii Zakharov (17:32.40)	1:14:38.24	Russia; Alexey Shafigulin (18:22.91); Anastasia Mulkova (19:02.14); Evgenia Kozyreva (19:28.58); Iakov Stryukov (18:09.68)	1:15:03.31	Italy; Mara Zaghet (19:15.95); Riccardo Campana (18:07.52); Serena Monduzzi (19:39.72); Davide De Ceglie (18:08.59)	1:15:11.78

^{c} Swimmers who participated in the heats only and received medals.

== Medal table ==
Rank	Nation	Gold	Silver	Bronze	Total
1	Russia (RUS)	13	12	9	34
2	China (CHN)	7	3	3	13
3	Ukraine (UKR)	6	5	3	14
4	Hungary (HUN)	3	3	3	9
5	South Korea (KOR)	2	4	4	10
6	Greece (GRE)	2	1	1	4
7	Colombia (COL)	1	2	3	6
8	Belarus (BLR)	1	1	1	3
9	Finland (FIN)	1	0	0	1
10	Italy (ITA)	0	2	4	6
11	Germany (GER)	0	1	2	3
12	France (FRA)	0	0	1	1
12	Slovakia (SVK)	0	0	1	1
12	Vietnam (VIE)	0	0	1	1
Totals (14 entries)		36	34	36	106
