= 2021 Finswimming World Championships =

International competition in Tomsk, Russia

21st Finswimming World Championships
- Venue: Aquatics Centre Zvezdniy
- Location: Tomsk, Russia
- Dates: 5–8 July

The 21st Finswimming World Championships were held in Tomsk, Russia at the Aquatics Centre Zvezdniy from 5 to 8 July 2021.

== Medal overview ==
=== Men's events ===
Event	Gold		Silver		Bronze	
50 m surface	Anastasios Mylonakis; Greece	15.39	Max Poschart; Germany	15.44	Zhang Siqian; China	15.46
100 m surface	Max Poschart; Germany	34.15	Egor Kachmashev; Russian Underwater Federation	34.84	Anastasios Mylonakis; Greece	35.37
200 m surface	Ádám Bukor; Hungary	1:20.44	Egor Kachmashev; Russian Underwater Federation	1:20.68	Oleksii Zakharov; Ukraine	1:20.89
400 m surface	Oleksii Zakharov; Ukraine	2:59.33	Alex Mozsár; Hungary	2:59.54	Ádám Bukor; Hungary	3:01.66
800 m surface	Oleksii Zakharov; Ukraine	6:23.35	Yoon Young-joong; South Korea	6:25.54	Hugo Meyer; France	6:26.29
1500 m surface	Derin Toparlak; Turkey	12:38.27	Sándor Pázmányi; Hungary	12:43.71	Iakov Stryukov; Russian Underwater Federation	12:45.31
50 m bi-fins	Aleksei Fedkin; Russian Underwater Federation	18.82	Iurii Sharykin; Russian Underwater Federation	18.84	Christos Bonias; Greece	18.92
100 m bi-fins	Aleksei Fedkin; Russian Underwater Federation	41.77	Iurii Sharykin; Russian Underwater Federation	41.78	Christos Bonias; Greece	42.05
200 m bi-fins	Christos Kalaitzopoulos; Greece	1:36.05	Bence Lengyeltóti; Hungary	1:36.99	Kelen Cséplő; Hungary	1:37.03
400 m bi-fins	Aleksei Fedkin; Russian Underwater Federation	3:26.81	Christos Kalaitzopoulos; Greece	3:28.57	Bence Lengyeltóti; Hungary	3:30.45
50 m apnea	Lee Dong-jin; South Korea	13.95	Zhang Siqian; China	14.05	Vladimir Zhuravlev; Russian Underwater Federation	14.19
100 m immersion	Shan Yongan; China	32.16	Park Tae-ho; South Korea	32.47	Stepan Vorobyev; Russian Underwater Federation	32.72
400 m immersion	Yoon Young-joong; South Korea	2:44.49	Shan Yongan; China	2:47.27	Stepan Vorobyev; Russian Underwater Federation	2:48.85
4×100 m surface relay	Russian Underwater Federation; Vladimir Zhuravlev (35.17); Vasilii Pushkarev (35.39); Vyatcheslav Noskov (35.22); Egor Kachmashev (34.42); Aleksandr Khudyshkin^{[a]} Vyatcheslav Noskov^{[a]} Aleksey Kazantsev^{[a]}	2:20.20	Germany; Robert Golenia (36.45); Max Poschart (34.02); Sidney Zeuner (37.09); Justus Mörstedt (35.14)	2:22.70	Colombia; Juan Rodríguez (36.76); Juan Duque (35.33); Mauricio Fernández (36.14); Juan Ocampo (35.31); Juan Giraldo^{[a]} Andrés Molano^{[a]}	2:23.54
4×200 m surface relay	Russian Underwater Federation; Aleksandr Khudyshkin (1:22.85); Vyatcheslav Noskov (1:21.64); Stepan Vorobyev (1:22.36); Egor Kachmashev (1:20.38)	5:27.23	Colombia; Juan Ocampo (1:21.44); Willington Valencia (1:24.74); Juan Giraldo (1:22.95); Alexander Jiménez (1:19.99)	5:29.12	Germany; Sidney Zeuner (1:24.89); Justus Mörstedt (1:21.37); Max Poschart (1:20.79); Robert Golenia (1:22.53)	5:29.58

^{a} Swimmers who participated in the heats only and received medals.

=== Women's events ===
Event	Gold		Silver		Bronze	
50 m surface	Ekaterina Mikhailushkina; Russian Underwater Federation	17.61	Jang Ye-sol; South Korea	17.68	Seo Ui-jin; South Korea	17.73
100 m surface	Ekaterina Mikhailushkina; Russian Underwater Federation	38.02; WR	Xu Yichuan; China	39.15	Shu Chengjing; China	39.51
200 m surface	Ekaterina Mikhailushkina; Russian Underwater Federation	1:27.27	Mariia Patlasova; Russian Underwater Federation	1:27.40	Xu Yichuan; China	1:30.20
400 m surface	Mariia Patlasova; Russian Underwater Federation	3:12.16; ER	Anastasiia Antoniak; Ukraine	3:17.52	Sofiia Hrechko; Ukraine	3:18.08
800 m surface	Johanna Schikora; Germany	6:54.47	Mariia Patlasova; Russian Underwater Federation	6:55.44	Gamila Aly Hassan; Egypt	7:01.54
1500 m surface	Johanna Schikora; Germany	13:22.91	Nada Magdy Hagrass; Egypt	13:36.99	Elena Poschart; Germany	13:40.44
50 m bi-fins	Petra Senánszky; Hungary	20.99	Krisztina Varga; Hungary	21.71	Choi Min-ji; South Korea	22.02
100 m bi-fins	Petra Senánszky; Hungary	45.42	Krisztina Varga; Hungary	47.23	Iryna Pikiner; Ukraine	48.23
200 m bi-fins	Krisztina Varga; Hungary	1:45.78	Aikaterini Maniati; Greece	1:47.23	Iana Martynova; Russian Underwater Federation	1:47.59
400 m bi-fins	Iana Martynova; Russian Underwater Federation	3:51.23	He Pin-li; Chinese Taipei	3:52.16	Sofiia Lamakh; Ukraine	3:53.19
50 m apnea	Hu Yaoyao; China	16.03	Alena Parshina; Russian Underwater Federation	16.18	Jang Ye-sol; South Korea	16.32
100 m immersion	Shu Chengjing; China	36.29	Alena Parshina; Russian Underwater Federation	36.35 =ER	Elena Lopatina; Russian Underwater Federation	37.06
400 m immersion	Sun Yiting; China	3:01.83	Anastassia-Anna Kunitsõna; Estonia	3:03.24	Chen Sijia; China	3:04.17
4×100 m surface relay	Russian Underwater Federation; Ekaterina Mikhailushkina (38.10); Aleksandra Skurlatova (38.65); Alena Parshina (39.23); Alina Nalbandyan (39.30); Vlada Markina^{[b]} Valeriia Baranovskaya^{[b]}	2:35.28	Ukraine; Anastasiia Makarenko (40.81); Sofiia Hrechko (38.50); Virsaviia Berezna (39.02); Viktoriia Uvarova (39.29)	2:37.62	China; Shu Chengjing (40.62); Xin Peiyao (41.05); Hu Yaoyao (39.39); Xu Yichuan (37.72)	2:38.78
4×200 m surface relay	Russian Underwater Federation; Valeriia Baranovskaya (1:26.38); Vlada Markina (1:30.59); Mariia Patlasova (1:26.41); Ekaterina Mikhailushkina (1:26.48); Alina Nalbandyan^{[b]}	5:49.86; WR	Ukraine; Sofiia Hrechko (1:31.93); Virsaviia Berezna (1:32.12); Anastasiia Makarenko (1:31.61); Anastasiia Antoniak (1:29.86)	6:05.52	Hungary; Sára Suba (1:33.04); Lilla Blaszák (1:32.96); Anita Szabó (1:32.67); Csilla Károlyi (1:30.88)	6:09.55

^{b} Swimmers who participated in the heats only and received medals.

=== Mixed events ===
Event	Gold		Silver		Bronze	
4×50 m surface relay	China; Zhang Siqian (15.48); Shu Chengjing (16.99); Hu Yaoyao (16.36); Tong Zhenbo (15.14); Wang Zhihao^{[c]}	1:03.97; WR	Russian Underwater Federation; Vladimir Zhuravlev (15.93); Aleksey Kazantsev (14.63); Aleksandra Skurlatova (16.81); Ekaterina Mikhailushkina (16.77)	1:04.14; ER	South Korea; Kim Chan-yeong (16.17); Park Zi-u (14.81); Jang Ye-sol (17.62); Seo Ui-jin (16.80)	1:05.04
4×100 m bi-fins relay	Hungary; Péter Holoda (41.83); Kelen Cséplő (42.12); Krisztina Varga (46.55); Petra Senánszky (44.84); Matthew Hamlin^{[c]}	2:55.34; WR	Russian Underwater Federation; Iurii Sharykin (41.97); Iana Martynova (48.12); Iuliia Grigoreva (47.57); Aleksei Fedkin (40.49); Vlada Markina^{[c]} Valeriia Andreeva^{[c]}	2:58.15	Ukraine; Viktor Riepin (42.81); Yevheniia Tymoshenko (48.21); Iryna Pikiner (48.16); Danylo Kolodiazhnyi (40.69)	2:59.87

^{c} Swimmers who participated in the heats only and received medals.

== Medal table ==
* Host nation (Russia)

Rank	Nation	Gold	Silver	Bronze	Total
1	Russian Underwater Federation*	12	10	6	28
2	Hungary	5	5	4	14
3	China	5	3	5	13
4	Germany	3	2	2	7
5	Ukraine	2	3	5	10
6	South Korea	2	3	4	9
7	Greece	2	2	3	7
8	Turkey	1	0	0	1
9	Colombia	0	1	1	2
9	Egypt	0	1	1	2
11	Chinese Taipei	0	1	0	1
11	Estonia	0	1	0	1
13	France	0	0	1	1
Totals (13 entries)		32	32	32	96
