= Finswimming at the 2009 World Games – Women's 50 m apnoea =

Finswimming – women's 50 m apnoea at the 2009 World Games
- Venue: Kaohsiung Swimming Pool
- Location: Kaohsiung, Taiwan
- Date: 23 July 2009
- Competitors: 16 from 12 nations

Medalists
gold medal	(China) Zhu Baozhen
silver medal	(China) Xu Huanshan
bronze medal	(Russia) Yana Kasimova

The women's 50 m apnoea competition in finswimming at the 2009 World Games took place on 23 July 2009 at the Kaohsiung Swimming Pool in Kaohsiung, Taiwan.

== Competition format ==
A total of 16 athletes entered the competition. The best eight athletes from preliminary round qualifies to the final.

== Results ==
=== Preliminary ===
Rank	Athlete	Nation	Time	Notes
1	Zhu Baozhen	China	15.93	Q, GR
2	Xu Huanshan	China	16.17	Q
3	Yana Kasimova	Russia	16.69	Q
4	Camille Heitz	France	16.79	Q
5	Kateryna Dyelova	Ukraine	16.80	Q
6	Tina Hirschfeldt	Germany	16.80	Q
7	Galija Sattarova	Estonia	16.90	Q
8	Lilla Szekely	Hungary	16.92	Q
9	Kim Hyeon-jin	South Korea	16.93	
10	Alix Perez Rubio	Colombia	16.99	
11	Margaryta Artiushenko	Ukraine	17.05	
12	Liu Hao-min	Chinese Taipei	17.46	
13	Yayoi Sakamoto	Japan	17.60	
14	Nicole Matthes	Germany	17.87	
15	Lea Pasqualotti	France	18.13	
16	Roberta Mastroianni	Italy	18.36	

=== Final ===
Rank	Athlete	Nation	Time	Note
1st place, gold medalist(s)	Zhu Baozhen	China	15.10	WR
2nd place, silver medalist(s)	Xu Huanshan	China	15.61	
3rd place, bronze medalist(s)	Yana Kasimova	Russia	16.32	
4	Camille Heitz	France	16.50	
5	Kateryna Dyelova	Ukraine	16.55	
6	Galija Sattarova	Estonia	16.60	
7	Tina Hirschfeldt	Germany	16.93	
8	Lilla Szekely	Hungary	17.13	
