= 2011 Finswimming World Championships =

2011 swimming competition held in Hungary

16th Finswimming World Championships
- Host city: Hódmezővásárhely, Hungary
- Date: 30 July –6 August 2011
- Venue: Gyarmati Dezső Sportuszoda
- Nations: 31
- Athletes: 350

The 16th Finswimming World Championships were held at 30 July –6 August 2011 in Hódmezővásárhely, Hungary at the Gyarmati Dezső Sportuszoda.

The Confédération Mondiale des Activités Subaquatiques announced Hódmezővásárhely as the host city in February 2011 following the cancellation of the 2nd CMAS Games proposed for Neiva & San Andreas Island, Colombia.

== Schedule ==
1	Number of finals
●	Other competitions

July/August 2011	30 Sat	31 Sun	01 Mon	02 Tue	03 Wed	04 Thu	05 Fri	06 Sat	Gold medals
Pool part	4	7	5	6	8				30
Long distance						2	2	2	6
Total gold medals	4	7	5	6	8	2	2	2	36
Cumulative total	4	11	16	22	30	32	34	36	

== Medal table ==
* Host Nation

* Host nation (Hungary)

Rank	Nation	Gold	Silver	Bronze	Total
1	Russia	17	8	8	33
2	China	10	4	0	14
3	Italy	3	8	5	16
4	Ukraine	2	6	6	14
5	Hungary*	2	1	4	7
6	Germany	2	0	6	8
7	South Korea	0	4	3	7
8	France	0	2	0	2
9	Belarus	0	1	1	2
9	Colombia	0	1	1	2
11	Czech Republic	0	1	0	1
12	Greece	0	0	2	2
Totals (12 entries)		36	36	36	108

== Long distance events ==
The long distance part of the 2011 Finswimming World Championships was held between 4–6 August in Hódmezővásárhely, Hungary at the Szeged rowing channel Maty-éri viztározó.

The following events were contested by both men and women in Hódmezővásárhely:

- 6 km individual
- 20 km individual
- 4x3 km relay

=== Schedule ===
Day	Event
Thursday, 4 August 2011	Women's 4x3000 m Men's 4x3000 m
Friday, 5 August 2011	Women's 6000 m Men's 6000 m
Saturday, 6 August 2011	Women's 20000 m Men's 20000 m

=== Medal table ===
Rank	Nation	Gold	Silver	Bronze	Total
1	Russia	5	2	1	8
2	Germany	1	0	3	4
3	Italy	0	2	1	3
3	Ukraine	0	2	1	3
Totals (4 entries)		6	6	6	18

=== Medal summary ===
==== Men ====
Event	Gold		Silver		Bronze	
6000 m	Roman Maletin (RUS)	00:49:54.53	Alexey Shafigulin (RUS)	00:50:44.71	Davide De Ceglie (ITA)	00:51:19.70
20000 m	Christoph Oefner (GER)	03:05:57.33	Simone Mallegni (ITA)	3:07:10.03	Christian Hoera (GER)	3:08.09.72
4x3000 m	Russia; Roman Maletin (25:13.71); Evgeny Smirnov (26:19.84); Denis Ponomarev (26:06.48); Alexey Shafigulin (24:56.80)	01:42:36.83	Italy; Simone Mallengni (25:50.80); Alex Battista (25:46.60); Alberto Rota (25:50.58); Davide De Ceglle (25:17.50)	01:42:45.48	Germany; Christian Hoera (25:57.63); Christoph Oefner (26:10.83); Yves Rolack (26:24.89); Max Lauschus (25:24.65)	01:43:58.00

==== Women ====
Event	Gold		Silver		Bronze	
6000 m	Marina Umerenko (RUS)	00:54:45.34	Iana Trofymets (UKR)	00:54:56.58	Elena Osmolskaya (RUS)	00:55:03.52
20000 m	Marina Voronina (RUS)	03:17:40.38	Sofya Eremtcova (RUS)	03:19:52.68	Tetiana Kransogor (UKR)	03:20:33.44
4x3000 m	Russia; Elena Osmolskaya (27:28.01); Maria Voronina (28:09.88); Marina Umerenko (27:27.10); Sofya Mukhina (27:41.95)	01:50:46.94	Ukraine; Tetiana Kransogor (27:52.02); Yevgeniya Oleynikova (27:58.70); Olga Tochyllina (29:41.22); Iana Trofymets (28:13.66)	01:53:45.60	Germany; Christine Muller (28:29.29); Carolin Haase (28:27.24); Christin Suape (29:45.56); Sandra Pilz (28:01.57)	01:54:44.16

== Pool events ==
The pool part of the 2011 Finswimming World Championships was held 30 July – 6 August at the Gyarmati Dezső Sportuszoda. in Hódmezővásárhely, Hungary.

The finswimming competition featured races in a long course (50 m) pool in 30 events (15 for males, 15 for females; 13 individual events and 2 relays for each gender).

The evening session schedule for the 2011 Finswimming Championships

Date	Saturday; 30 July 2011	Sunday; 31 July 2011	Monday; 1 August 2011	Tuesday; 2 August 2011	Wednesday; 3 August 2011
E v e n t s	Women's 50m apnea Men's 100m immersion Women's 400m surface Men's 4 × 200 m relay	Men's 800m immersion direct final on morning Men's 50m surface Men's 50m bifins Men's 1500m surface Women's 200m surface Women's 200m bifins Men's 400m surface	Women's 800m surface Women's 100m immersion Men's 100m surface Men's 100m bifins Men's 400m immersion	Men's 50m apnea Men's 800m surface Women's 100m surface Women's 100m bifins Women's 400m immersion Women's 4 × 200 m relay	Women's 800m immersion direct final on morning Women's 50m surface Women's 50m bifins Women's 1500m surface Men's 200m surface Men's 200m bifins Women's 4 × 100 m relay Men's 4 × 100 m relay

Note: each distance had preliminary heats and finals, but only 800m immersion is on direct final in morning sessions.

=== Medal table ===
Rank	Nation	Gold	Silver	Bronze	Total
1	Russia	12	6	7	25
2	China	10	4	0	14
3	Italy	3	6	4	13
4	Ukraine	2	4	5	11
5	Hungary	2	1	4	7
6	Germany	1	0	3	4
7	South Korea	0	4	3	7
8	France	0	2	0	2
9	Belarus	0	1	1	2
9	Colombia	0	1	1	2
11	Czech Republic	0	1	0	1
12	Greece	0	0	2	2
Totals (12 entries)		30	30	30	90

=== Results ===
==== Men's events ====
Event	Gold		Silver		Bronze	
50 m surface	Pavel Kabanov; Russia	15.33	Mauricio Fernandez; Colombia	15.68	Cesare Fumarola; Italy	15.78
100 m surface	Pavel Kabanov; Russia	35.40	Andrea Nava; Italy	35.76	Cesare Fumarola; Italy	35.79
200 m surface	Stefano Figini; Italy	1:21.01; WR	Cesare Fumarola; Italy	1:21.76	Max Lauschus; Germany	1:22.65
400 m surface	Max Lauschus; Germany	2:58.49; WR	Stefano Figini; Italy	2:58.79	Evgeny Smirnov; Russia	3:01.07
800 m surface	Stefano Figini; Italy	6:17.98; WR	Oleksandr Odynokov; Ukraine	6:20.41	Max Lauschus; Germany	6:20.75
1500 m surface	Oleksandr Odynokov; Ukraine	12:22.00	Stefano Figini; Italy	12:26.58	Alexey Shafigulin; Russia	12:26.95
50 m bifins	Aleksandr Ivanets; Russia	19.35	Ondrej Broda; Czech Republic	19.45	Matyas Szenes; Hungary	19.68
100 m bifins	Aleksandr Ivanets; Russia	42.85; WR	Andrea Rampazzo; Italy	43.27	Dmitry Gavrilov; Belarus	43.28
200 m bifins	Aleksandr Ivanets; Russia	1:35.62; WR	Dmitry Gavrilov; Belarus	1:37.25	Mykhailo Iatsenko; Ukraine	1:37.63
50 m apnea	Pavel Kabanov; Russia	14.11; WR	Kwanho Lee; South Korea	14.18	Taekyun Kim; South Korea	14.22
100 m immersion	Pavel Kabanov; Russia	32.25	Taekyun Kim; South Korea	32.73	Mauricio Fernandez; Colombia	32.94
400 m immersion	Denes Kanyo; Hungary	2:42.90; WR	Youngjoong Yoon; South Korea	2:45.23	Igor Saprykin; Russia	2:45.89
800 m immersion	Cheng Chi; China	5:51.51	Denes Kanyo; Hungary	5:52.16	Szilard Vilhelm; Hungary	5:52.52
4×100 m freestyle relay	Russia; Pavel Kabanov (35.36); Vladimir Sokolov (35.30); Andrey Burakov (35.26); Dmitry Kokorev (34.89)	2:20.81; WR	Italy; Cesare Fumarola (35.17); Andrea Nava (34.63); Stefano Figini (34.38); Julio Tugnoli (36.68)	2:20.86	Greece; William Paul Baldwin (34.89); Ilias Kranias (36.53); Loukas Karetzopoulos (37.23); Antonios Tsourounakis (35.68)	2:24.33
4×200 m freestyle relay	Italy; Cesare Fumarola (1:21.28); Andrea Nava (1:21.05); Julio Tugnoli (1:25:28); Stefano Figini (1:20.28)	5:27.89; WR	Russia; Evgeny Smirnov (1:23.78); Sergey Prus (1:23.78); Roman Maletin (1:23.72); Dmitry Kokorev (1:21.79)	5:33.07	Greece; William Paul Baldwin (1:22.33); Antonios Tsourounakis (1:21.98); Ilias Kranias (1:25.61); Anargyros Vasilopoulos (1:23.99)	5:33.91

==== Women's events ====
Event	Gold		Silver		Bronze	
50 m surface	Huanshan Xu; China	17.66	Yaoyue Liang; China	17.69	Margaryta Artiushenko; Ukraine	17.79
100 m surface	Margaryta Artiushenko; Ukraine	39.60	Camille Heitz; France	40.63	Yesol Jang; South Korea	40.79
200 m surface	Valeria Baranovskaya; Russia	1:29.59	Ahram Jeon; South Korea	1:31.68	Vasilisa Kravchuk; Russia	1:22.65
400 m surface	Jiao Liu; China	3:12.90; WR	Valeria Baranovskaya; Russia	3:15.86	Vasilisa Kravchuk; Russia	3:20.67
800 m surface	Jiao Liu; China	6:46.79; WR	Iana Trofymets; Ukraine	6:58.35	Vasilisa Kravchuk; Russia	7:04.35
1500 m surface	Jiao Liu; China	13:01.48; WR	Iana Trofymets; Ukraine	13:35.57	Olga Godovana; Ukraine	13:42.73
50 m bifins	Vitalina Simonova; Russia	22.15	Medeya Dzhavakhishvili; Russia	22.51	Francesca Fusco; Italy	22.65
100 m bifins	Vitalina Simonova; Russia	47.83; WR	Medeya Dzhavakhishvili; Russia	48.23	Petra Senánszky; Hungary	48.86
200 m bifins	Petra Senánszky; Hungary	1:45.29; WR	Medeya Dzhavakhishvili; Russia	1:45.84	Lila Stier; Hungary	1:47.07
50 m apnea	Baozhen Zhu; China	16.37	Camille Heitz; France	16.75	Anna Ber; Russia	16.85
100 m immersion	Huanshan Xu; China	35.96	Baozhen Zhu; China	36.09	Margaryta Artiushenko; Ukraine	36.92
400 m immersion	Jiao Liu; China	2:59.24	Yichuan Xu; China	3:01.30	Jinhee Shin; South Korea	3:08.18
800 m immersion	Jiao Liu; China	6:29.32	Yichuan Xu; China	6:32.34	Sandra Pilz; Germany	6:41.44
4×100 m freestyle relay	China; Baozhen Zhu (40.20); Jing Li (41.63); Yaoyue Liang (40.44); Huanshan Xu (40.25)	2:42.52	Russia; Anna Ber (40.80); Vera Iljushina (41.56); Valeria Baranovskaya (40.14); Vasilisa Kravchuk (40.74)	2:43.24	Ukraine; Anastasia Antoniak (42.06); Kateryna Dyelova (41.67); Olga Shliakhovska (40.78); Margaryta Artiushenko (39.83)	2:24.33
4×200 m freestyle relay	Russia; Valeria Baranovskaya (1:29.69); Maria Radchenko (1:34.60); Elena Kononova (1:34.70); Vasilisa Kravchuk (1:31.10)	6:10.09	Ukraine; Iana Trofymets (1:34.70); Anastasia Antoniak (1:34.98); Iryna Kucher (1:38.51); Olga Shliakhovska (1:32.84)	6:21.03	Italy; Giorgia Veronica Viero (1:35:33); Silvia Baroncini (1:34.62); Debora Chiarello (1:37.20); Viola Donadello (1:36.52)	6:23.67

== See also ==
- Finswimming World Championships – International event for the underwater sport of finswimming
