= Finswimming at the 2017 World Games – Women's 400 m surface =

Finswimming - Women's Surface 400 m at the 2017 World Games
- Venue: Orbita Indoor Swimming Pool, Wrocław, Poland
- Dates: 22 July 2017
- Competitors: 8 from 7 nations

Medalists
| gold medal | (China) Sun Yiting |
| silver medal | (South Korea) Kim Bo-kyung |
| bronze medal | (Ukraine) Anastasiia Antoniak |

The women's surface 400 m event in finswimming at the 2017 World Games took place on 22 July 2017 at the Orbita Indoor Swimming Pool in Wrocław, Poland.

== Competition format ==
A total of 8 athletes entered the competition. Only final was held.

== Results ==
=== Final ===
| Rank | Athlete | Nation | Time | Note |
|---|---|---|---|---|
| 1st place, gold medalist(s) | Sun Yiting | China | 3:14.47 | GR |
| 2nd place, silver medalist(s) | Kim Bo-Kyung | South Korea | 3:16.33 | |
| 3rd place, bronze medalist(s) | Anastasiia Antoniak | Ukraine | 3:17.61 | |
| 4 | Yuliia Chumak | Ukraine | 3:18.48 | |
| 5 | Kseniia Ignatova | Russia | 3:20.40 | |
| 6 | Zuzana Svozilova | Czech Republic | 3:20.86 | |
| 7 | Terhi Ikonen | Finland | 3:23.68 | |
| 8 | Erica Barbon | Italy | 3:27.22 | |
