= Finswimming at the 2017 World Games =

Competition for the underwarter sport of finswimming

- Venue: Orbita Swimming Pool
- Location: Wrocław
- Dates: 21–22 July 2017
- Competitors: 95 from 19 nations

The Finswimming competition at the World Games 2017 took place from July 21 to July 22, in Wrocław in Poland, at the Orbita Indoor Swimming Pool. Overall 95 athletes from 19 countries participated.

== Participating nations ==
- Belarus (2)
- Colombia (8)
- China (5)
- Chinese Taipei (1)
- Croatia (1)
- Czech Republic (2)
- Finland (1)
- France (5)
- Germany (4)
- Greece (6)
- Hungary (8)
- Italy (9)
- Japan (2)
- Ukraine (7)
- Poland (8)
- Russia (18)
- Spain (1)
- South Korea (6)
- Vietnam (1)

== Medals table ==
| Rank | Nation | Gold | Silver | Bronze | Total |
|---|---|---|---|---|---|
| 1 | Russia (RUS) | 8 | 1 | 3 | 12 |
| 2 | Hungary (HUN) | 3 | 2 | 1 | 6 |
| 3 | South Korea (KOR) | 1 | 3 | 2 | 6 |
| 4 | China (CHN) | 1 | 1 | 0 | 2 |
| 5 | Belarus (BLR) | 1 | 0 | 1 | 2 |
| 6 | Germany (GER) | 0 | 3 | 1 | 4 |
| 7 | Colombia (COL) | 0 | 2 | 0 | 2 |
| 8 | Czech Republic (CZE) | 0 | 1 | 1 | 2 |
| 8 | Italy (ITA) | 0 | 1 | 1 | 2 |
| 10 | Ukraine (UKR) | 0 | 0 | 4 | 4 |
| Totals (10 entries) | | 14 | 14 | 14 | 42 |

== Medals summary ==
=== Men ===
| Event | Gold | | Silver | | Bronze | |
|---|---|---|---|---|---|---|
| Apnoea 50 m | Pavel Kabanov; Russia | 13.87 GR | Mauricio Fernández; Colombia | 13.94 | Lee Dong-jin; South Korea | 14.09 |
| Bi-fins 50 m | Andrey Arbuzov; Russia | 18.55 | Jakub Jarolím; Czech Republic | 19.08 | Dmitry Gavrilov; Belarus | 19.18 |
| Bi-fins 100 m | Dmitry Gavrilov; Belarus | 41.65 | Gergő Kosina; Hungary | 41.91 | Jakub Jarolím; Czech Republic | 42.18 |
| Surface 100 m | Dmitry Zhurman; Russia | 34.70 | Max Poschart; Germany | 34.84 | Pavel Kabanov; Russia | 34.92 |
| Surface 200 m | Dmitry Zhurman; Russia | 1:20.25 GR | Max Poschart; Germany | 1:20.87 | Dmitry Kokorev; Russia | 1:20.89 |
| Surface 400 m | Dénes Kanyó; Hungary | 2:58.41 | Max Lauschus; Germany | 2:59.02 | Davide De Ceglie; Italy | 3:01.46 |
| Surface relay 4 × 100 m | Russia; Pavel Kabanov (34.22) GR; Aleksey Kazantsev (34.72); Dmitry Kokorev (33.89); Dmitry Zhurman (33.71) | 2:16.54 WR | Italy; Kevin Zanardi (36.22); Andrea Nava (34.40); Stefano Figini (35.56); Cesare Fumarola (32.84) | 2:19.02 | Germany; Max Lauschus (35.12); Max Poschart (35.71); Florian Kritzler (35.40); Malte Striegler (33.21) | 2:19.44 |

=== Women ===
| Event | Gold | | Silver | | Bronze | |
|---|---|---|---|---|---|---|
| Apnoea 50 m | Jang Ye-sol; South Korea | 16.02 | Kim Ga-in; South Korea | 16.40 | Kateryna Dyelova; Ukraine | 16.46 |
| Bi-fins 50 m | Petra Senánszky; Hungary | 20.52 WR | Choi Min-ji; South Korea | 21.47 AS | Krisztina Varga; Hungary | 21.58 |
| Bi-fins 100 m | Petra Senánszky; Hungary | 45.16 WR | Krisztina Varga; Hungary | 46.77 | Iryna Pikiner; Ukraine | 46.92 |
| Surface 100 m | Ekaterina Mikhaylushkina; Russia | 38.40 ER | Shu Chengjing; China | 38.60 | Anna Ber; Russia | 38.72 |
| Surface 200 m | Valeriya Baranovskaya; Russia | 1:25.41 WR | Ekaterina Mikhaylushkina; Russia | 1:27.57 | Anastasiia Antoniak; Ukraine | 1:28.76 |
| Surface 400 m | Sun Yiting; China | 3:14.47 GR | Kim Bo-kyung; South Korea | 3:16.33 | Anastasiia Antoniak; Ukraine | 3:17.61 |
| Surface relay 4 × 100 m | Russia; Valeriya Baranovskaya (39.30); Anna Ber (37.97); Aleksandra Skurlatova (40.20); Ekaterina Mikhaylushkina (37.31) | 2:34.78 GR | Colombia; Grace Fernández (38.93) AM; Viviana Retamozo (39.69); Kelly Pérez (38.84); Paula Aguirre (39.37) | 2:36.83; AM | South Korea; Jang Ye-sol (39.76); Kim Eun-kyoung (40.86); Kim Ga-in (38.43); Kim Bo-kyung (39.40) | 2:38.45 |
