= 2016 Finswimming World Championships =

International competition in Volos, Greece

19th Finswimming World Championships
- Venue: Swimming Pool Neas Ionias “Vasilis Polymeros”
- Location: Volos, Greece
- Dates: 24–28 July
- Competitors: 432

The 19th Finswimming World Championships was held in Volos, Greece at the Swimming Pool Neas Ionias “Vasilis Polymeros” from 24 to 28 July 2016.

== Medal overview ==
=== Men's events ===
| Event | Gold | | Silver | | Bronze | |
|---|---|---|---|---|---|---|
| 50 m surface | Mauricio Fernández (COL) | 15.00 WR | Loukas Karetzopoulos (GRE) | 15.24 | Aleksey Kazantsev (RUS) | 15.47 |
| 100 m surface | Max Poschart (GER) | 34.22 | Alexandre Noir (FRA) | 34.48 | Loukas Karetzopoulos (GRE) | 34.55 |
| 200 m surface | Juan Ocampo (COL) | 1:19.76 | Dmitrii Zhurman (RUS) | 1:20.76 | Dmitrii Kokorev (RUS) | 1:20.83 |
| 400 m surface | Antonios Tsourounakis (GRE) | 2:58.12 | Evgeny Smirnov (RUS) | 2:58.85 | Christos Christoforidis (GRE) | 2:59.29 |
| 800 m surface | Alexey Shafigulin (RUS) | 6:19.28 | Christos Christoforidis (GRE) | 6:21.54 | Oleksandr Odynokov (UKR) | 6:26.06 |
| 1500 m surface | Alexey Shafigulin (RUS) | 12:15.53 | Oleksandr Odynokov (UKR) | 12:25.84 | Davide De Ceglie (ITA) | 12:36.27 |
| 50 m bi-fins | Andrey Arbuzov (RUS) | 18.50 | Kristijan Tomić (CRO) | 18.79 | Ádám Sincki (HUN) | 18.87 |
| 100 m bi-fins | Dmitry Seryakov (RUS) | 41.44 WR | Gergő Kosina (HUN) | 41.69 | Clément Becq (FRA) | 42.14 |
| 200 m bi-fins | Gergő Kosina (HUN) | 1:33.31 WR | You Gyeong-heon (KOR) | 1:36.19 | Vladimir Sidorov (RUS) | 1:36.20 |
| 50 m apnea | Lee Kwan-ho (KOR) | 13.85 | Mauricio Fernández (COL) | 14.00 | Pavel Kabanov (RUS) | 14.02 |
| 100 m immersion | Kim Tae-kyun (KOR) Mauricio Fernández (COL) | 31.34 WR | Not awarded | | Lee Kwan-ho (KOR) | 31.46 |
| 400 m immersion | Chi Cheng (CHN) | 2:40.40 WR | Tong Zhenbo (CHN) | 2:40.42 | Denis Grubnik (UKR) | 2:46.09 |
| 4×100 m surface relay | Russia; Dmitrii Zhurman (35.01); Vladimir Zhuravlev (35.85); Pavel Kabanov (33.94); Dmitrii Kokorev (34.50); Aleksey Kazantsev^{[a]} Viacheslav Popov^{[a]} | 2:19.30 | Germany; Max Poschart (34.56); Florian Kritzler (36.47); Max Lauschus (34.52); Malte Striegler (33.92) | 2:19.47 | Italy; Cesare Fumarola (34.88); Stefano Figini (34.33); Kevin Zanardi (35.64); Andrea Nava (35.13); Giona Cristofari^{[a]} | 2:19.98 |
| 4×200 m surface relay | Russia; Dmitrii Zhurman (1:19.18); Viacheslav Popov (1:22.73); Evgeny Smirnov (1:21.74); Dmitrii Kokorev (1:20.16) | 5:23.81 | Italy; Stefano Figini (1:21.77); Cesare Fumarola (1:22.80); Kevin Zanardi (1:20.61); Davide De Ceglie (1:19.93); Andrea Nava^{[a]} | 5:25.11 | Germany; Malte Striegler (1:23.00); Max Lauschus (1:20.82); Florian Kritzler (1:21.84); Max Poschart (1:20.52); Jens Peter Ostrowski^{[a]} Tim Willruth^{[a]} | 5:26.18 |
| 6 km open water | Ramírez Jiménez (COL) | 27:47.33 | Davide De Ceglie (ITA) | 28:12.36 | Roman Maletin (RUS) | 28:32.52 |

^{a} Swimmers who participated in the heats only and received medals.

=== Women's events ===
| Event | Gold | | Silver | | Bronze | |
|---|---|---|---|---|---|---|
| 50 m surface | Jang Ye-sol (KOR) | 16.94 WR | Kim Ga-in (KOR) | 17.44 | Erica Barbon (ITA) | 17.81 |
| 100 m surface | Shu Chengjing (CHN) | 38.13 | Jang Ye-sol (KOR) | 38.61 | Ekaterina Mikhailushkina (RUS) Xu Yichuan (CHN) | 38.72 |
| 200 m surface | Valeria Baranovskaya (RUS) | 1:26.88 | Shu Chengjing (CHN) | 1:28.05 | Erica Barbon (ITA) | 1:28.61 |
| 400 m surface | Sun Yiting (CHN) | 3:16.24 | Anastasiia Antoniak (UKR) | 3:16.54 | Yulia Chumak (UKR) | 3:18.64 |
| 800 m surface | Sun Yiting (CHN) | 6:49.27 | Ievgeniia Olieynikova (UKR) | 6:53.17 | Nadezhda Borisova (RUS) | 6:53.78 |
| 1500 m surface | Sun Yiting (CHN) | 13:15.05 | Ievgeniia Olieynikova (UKR) | 13:17.83 | Nadezhda Borisova (RUS) | 13:20.39 |
| 50 m bi-fins | Petra Senánszky (HUN) | 20.98 WR | Iryna Pikiner (UKR) | 21.51 | Choi Min-ji (KOR) | 21.52 |
| 100 m bi-fins | Petra Senánszky (HUN) | 45.69 WR | Iryna Pikiner (UKR) | 46.88 | Krisztina Varga (HUN) | 47.53 |
| 200 m bi-fins | Petra Senánszky (HUN) | 1:41.42 WR | Krisztina Varga (HUN) | 1:45.16 | Weronika Prentka (POL) | 1:46.21 |
| 50 m apnea | Jang Ye-sol (KOR) | 15.59 | Kim Ga-in (KOR) | 16.04 | Sofia Ktena (GRE) | 16.22 |
| 100 m immersion | Jang Ye-sol (KOR) | 35.44 | Xu Yichuan (CHN) | 35.96 | Liu Simin (CHN) | 36.04 |
| 400 m immersion | Chen Sijia (CHN) | 2:56.87 WR | Sun Yiting (CHN) | 2:57.01 | Shin Jee-hee (KOR) | 3:00.76 |
| 4×100 m surface relay | Russia; Ekaterina Mikhailushkina (39.38); Anna Ber (38.64); Alexsandra Skurlatova (38.37); Vera Ilyushina (38.15); Margarita Timofeeva^{[b]} | 2:34.54 WR | China; Shu Chenjing (39.26); Yuan Yaqi (40.75); Liu Simin (39.34); Xu Yichuan (37.12) | 2:36.47 | Colombia; Grace Fernández (40.36); Alix Perez (39.81); Paula Aguirre (38.26); Kelly Perez (39.40); Michelle Mora^{[b]} | 2:37.83 |
| 4×200 m surface relay | Russia; Valeria Baranovskaya (1:26.33); Ekaterina Mikhailushkina (1:29.55); Alena Shiryaeva (1:30.83); Margarita Timofeeva (1:30.36); Alexsandra Skurlatova^{[b]} Vera Ilyushina^{[b]} | 5:57.07 | China; Shu Chenjing (1:30.10); Xin Peiyao (1:32.28); Sun Yiting (1:32.68); Xu Yichuan (1:27.85) | 6:02.91 | Ukraine; Svitlana Zhukova (1:32.90); Valentyna Rieznik (1:31.49); Kateryna Sokolovska (1:33.85); Anastasiia Antoniak (1:29.51) | 6:07.75 |
| 6 km open water | Nadezhda Borisova (RUS) | 56:43.80 | Tatyana Krasnogor (UKR) | 58:49.77 | Loren Baron (FRA) | 59:02.92 |

^{b} Swimmers who participated in the heats only and received medals.

=== Mixed events ===
| Event | Gold | | Silver | | Bronze | |
|---|---|---|---|---|---|---|
| 4×2 km open water relay | Russia; Alexey Shafigulin (17:42.15); Elena Kononova (20:32.53); Nadezhda Borisova (19:23.44); Dmitry Lobchenko (18:40.92) | 1:16:19.04 | Ukraine; Roman Blagodir (18:12.28); Tatyana Krasnogor (20:05.89); Ievgeniia Olieynikova (20:05.18); Oleksandr Odynokov (19:19.59) | 1:17:42.94 | Greece; Christos Christoforidis (17:34.84); Christos Damolis (19:39.15); Despoina Makria (20:23.79); Aikaterini Kalamaridi (20:44.71) | 1:18:22.49 |

== Medal table ==
* Host nation

| Rank | Nation | Gold | Silver | Bronze | Total |
|---|---|---|---|---|---|
| 1 | Russia (RUS) | 11 | 2 | 8 | 21 |
| 2 | China (CHN) | 6 | 6 | 2 | 14 |
| 3 | South Korea (KOR) | 5 | 4 | 3 | 12 |
| 4 | Hungary (HUN) | 4 | 2 | 2 | 8 |
| 5 | Colombia (COL) | 4 | 1 | 1 | 6 |
| 6 | Greece (GRE)* | 1 | 2 | 4 | 7 |
| 7 | Germany (GER) | 1 | 1 | 1 | 3 |
| 8 | Ukraine (UKR) | 0 | 8 | 4 | 12 |
| 9 | Italy (ITA) | 0 | 2 | 4 | 6 |
| 10 | France (FRA) | 0 | 1 | 2 | 3 |
| 11 | Croatia (CRO) | 0 | 1 | 0 | 1 |
| 12 | Poland (POL) | 0 | 0 | 1 | 1 |
| Totals (12 entries) | | 32 | 30 | 32 | 94 |
