= 2022 Finswimming World Championships =

- Venue: Aquatics Centre Hernando Botero O'Byrne
- Location: Cali, Colombia
- Dates: 20–23 July

The 2022 Finswimming World Championships Indoor were held in Cali, Colombia at the Aquatics Centre Hernando Botero O'Byrne from 20 to 23 July 2022.

Belarusian and Russian finswimmers were not allowed to compete at the event after a ban as a result of the Russian invasion of Ukraine.

== Medal overview ==
=== Men's events ===
Event	Gold		Silver		Bronze	
50 m surface	Filip Strikinac; Croatia	15.18	Mauricio Fernández; Colombia	15.33	Max Poschart; Germany	15.34
100 m surface	Max Poschart; Germany	34.09	Filip Strikinac; Croatia	34.82	Justus Mörstedt; Germany	34.95
200 m surface	Ádám Bukor; Hungary	1:21.28	Nándor Kiss; Hungary	1:21.56	Justus Mörstedt; Germany	1:22.04
400 m surface	Nándor Kiss; Hungary	2:56.07	Alex Mozsár; Hungary	2:59.75	Derin Toparlak; Turkey	3:01.44
800 m surface	Nándor Kiss; Hungary	6:21.04	Alex Mozsár; Hungary	6:23.64	Yoon Young-joong; South Korea	6:25.38
1500 m surface	Oleksii Zakharov; Ukraine	12:29.89	Alex Mozsár; Hungary	12:34.30	Derin Toparlak; Turkey	12:38.10
50 m bi-fins	Szymon Kropidłowski; Poland	18.55	Marco Orsi; Italy	18.71	Christos Bonias; Greece	19.04
100 m bi-fins	Szymon Kropidłowski; Poland	41.11 WR	Kim Min-kyoung; South Korea	42.07	Péter Holoda; Hungary	42.30
200 m bi-fins	Kelen Cséplő; Hungary	1:35.69	Christos Kalaitzopoulos; Greece	1:35.76	Bence Lengyeltóti; Hungary	1:35.84
400 m bi-fins	Bence Lengyeltóti; Hungary	3:31.36	Christos Kalaitzopoulos; Greece	3:32.89	Kelen Cséplő; Hungary	3:33.18
50 m apnea	Zhang Siqian; China	14.07	Park Tae-ho; South Korea	14.10	Tong Zhenbo; China	14.20
100 m immersion	Tong Zhenbo; China	31.32	Park Tae-ho; South Korea	31.48	Max Poschart; Germany	31.71
400 m immersion	Yoon Young-joong; South Korea	2:43.00	Justus Mörstedt; Germany	2:50.23	Hugo Meyer; France	2:51.66
4×100 m surface relay	Germany; Robert Golenia (36.20); Malte Striegler (34.54); Justus Mörstedt (33.92); Max Poschart (33.73); Sidney Zeuner^{[a]}	2:18.39	Colombia; Juan Duque (35.45); Juan Ocampo (34.58); Mauricio Fernández (34.43); Juan Rodríguez (34.64); Willington Valencia^{[a]} Marlon Tovar^{[a]} Juan Giraldo^{[a]}	2:19.10	Hungary; Alex Mozsár (36.27); Nándor Kiss (35.55); Matthew Hamlin (36.16); Ádám Bukor (35.37); Sándor Pázmányi^{[a]}	2:23.35
4×200 m surface relay	Hungary; Alex Mozsár (1:20.91); Nándor Kiss (1:20.96); Matthew Hamlin (1:25.97); Ádám Bukor (1:19.35)	5:27.19	Colombia; Juan Ocampo (1:24.25); Juan Rodríguez (1:22.88); Willington Valencia (1:23.35); Juan Giraldo (1:19.93)	5:30.41	Germany; Robert Golenia (1:22.96); Justus Mörstedt (1:22.13); Duncan Gaida (1:26.80); Max Poschart (1:19.56)	5:31.45

^{a} Swimmers who participated in the heats only and received medals.

=== Women's events ===
Event	Gold		Silver		Bronze	
50 m surface	Hu Yaoyao; China	17.18	Krisztina Varga; Hungary	17.65	Shu Chengjing; China	17.66
100 m surface	Paula Aguirre; Colombia	39.40	Shu Chengjing; China	39.47	Viktoriia Uvarova; Ukraine	40.09
200 m surface	Xu Yichuan; China	1:29.52	Sofiia Hrechko; Ukraine	1:30.29	Dora Bassi; Croatia	1:31.32
400 m surface	Sofiia Hrechko; Ukraine	3:18.03	Anastasiia Antoniak; Ukraine	3:19.23	Johanna Schikora; Germany	3:20.21
800 m surface	Sofiia Hrechko; Ukraine	7:02.20	Johanna Schikora; Germany	7:03.24	Elena Poschart; Germany	7:07.35
1500 m surface	Johanna Schikora; Germany	13:39.17	Elena Poschart; Germany	13:51.86	Nada Magdy Hagrass; Egypt	13:58.00
50 m bi-fins	Petra Senánszky; Hungary	20.89	Choi Min-ji; South Korea	21.88	Antonina Dudek; Poland	22.13
100 m bi-fins	Petra Senánszky; Hungary	45.79	Choi Min-ji; South Korea	48.23	Zuzana Hrašková; Slovakia	48.28
200 m bi-fins	He Pin-li; Chinese Taipei	1:46.67	Zuzana Hrašková; Slovakia	1:46.94	Iryna Pikiner; Ukraine	1:47.32
400 m bi-fins	Dorottya Pernyész; Hungary	3:51.63	Laura Franchin; Italy	3:52.96	Sofiia Lamakh; Ukraine	3:53.48
50 m apnea	Shu Chengjing; China	15.95	Paula Aguirre; Colombia	16.08	Seo Ui-jin; South Korea	16.11
100 m immersion	Shu Chengjing; China	35.97	Maïwenn Hamon; France	36.87	Xu Yichuan; China	36.93
400 m immersion	Manon Douyère; France	3:03.02	Irati Lacunza; Spain	3:05.26	Xu Yichuan; China	3:07.64
4×100 m surface relay	China; Shu Chengjing (39.13); Hu Yaoyao (39.53); Chen Sijia (41.55); Xu Yichuan (38.54)	2:38.75	Hungary; Lilla Blaszák (40.98); Sára Suba (39.72); Petra Senánszky (41.19); Krisztina Varga (38.65)	2:40.54	Colombia; Grace Fernández (40.75); Viviana Retamozo (41.14); Diana Moreno (39.33); Paula Aguirre (39.45); Valentina Diago^{[b]} María Lopera^{[b]} Nikol Ortega^{[b]}	2:40.65
4×200 m surface relay	Ukraine; Sofiia Hrechko (1:31.89); Viktoriia Uvarova (1:32.10); Anastasiia Makarenko (1:32.57); Anastasiia Antoniak (1:30.24)	6:06.80	Hungary; Sára Suba (1:33.80); Krisztina Varga (1:34.27); Anita Szabó (1:32.24); Lilla Blaszák (1:31.21); Petra Senánszky^{[b]}	6:11.52	Germany; Johanna Schikora (1:32.93); Michèle Rütze (1:32.31); Elena Poschart (1:33.69); Nadja Barthel (1:33.22); Lisa Dethloff^{[b]}	6:12.15

^{b} Swimmers who participated in the heats only and received medals.

=== Mixed events ===
Event	Gold		Silver		Bronze	
4×50 m surface relay	China; Zhang Siqian (15.79); Shu Chengjing (17.08); Hu Yaoyao (16.60); Tong Zhenbo (14.89); Shan Yongan^{[c]} Wang Zhihao^{[c]}	1:04.36	South Korea; Park Zi-u (15.83); Seo Ui-jin (17.27); Park Tae-ho (14.77); Kim Ga-in (17.18); Lee Kwan-ho^{[c]}	1:05.05	Colombia; Juan Rodríguez (16.05); Grace Fernández (18.06); Paula Aguirre (16.68); Mauricio Fernández (14.49); Marlon Tovar^{[c]} Diana Moreno^{[c]} Valentina Diago^{[c]}	1:05.28
4×100 m bi-fins relay	Hungary; Péter Holoda (41.88); Kelen Cséplő (41.90); Krisztina Varga (47.42); Petra Senánszky (45.10); Matthew Hamlin^{[c]}	2:56.30	Italy; Laura Franchin (50.08); Riccardo Romano (42.09); Viola Magoga (48.66); Marco Orsi (40.25)	3:01.08	Poland; Szymon Kropidłowski (40.87); Antonina Dudek (48.01); Julia Małachowska (48.99); Bartosz Makowski (43.25)	3:01.12

^{c} Swimmers who participated in the heats only and received medals.

== Medal table ==
* Host nation (Colombia)

Rank	Nation	Gold	Silver	Bronze	Total
1	Hungary	10	7	4	21
2	China	8	1	4	13
3	Ukraine	4	2	3	9
4	Germany	3	3	8	14
5	Poland	2	0	2	4
6	South Korea	1	6	2	9
7	Colombia*	1	4	2	7
8	Croatia	1	1	1	3
8	France	1	1	1	3
10	Chinese Taipei	1	0	0	1
11	Italy	0	3	0	3
12	Greece	0	2	1	3
13	Slovakia	0	1	1	2
14	Spain	0	1	0	1
15	Turkey	0	0	2	2
16	Egypt	0	0	1	1
Totals (16 entries)		32	32	32	96
