= Finswimming at the 2017 World Games – Women's 200 m surface =

Finswimming - Women's Surface 200 m at the 2017 World Games
- Venue: Orbita Indoor Swimming Pool, Wrocław, Poland
- Dates: 21 July 2017
- Competitors: 8 from 6 nations
- Winning time: 1:25.41

Medalists
gold medal	Valeriya Baranovskaya	Russia
silver medal	Ekaterina Mikhaylushkina	Russia
bronze medal	Anastasiia Antoniak	Ukraine

The women's surface 200 m event in finswimming at the 2017 World Games took place on 21 July 2017 at the Orbita Indoor Swimming Pool in Wrocław, Poland.

== Competition format ==
A total of 8 athletes entered the competition. Only final was held.

== Results ==
=== Final ===
Rank	Athlete	Nation	Time	Note
1st place, gold medalist(s)	Valeriya Baranovskaya	Russia	1:25.41	WR
2nd place, silver medalist(s)	Ekaterina Mikhaylushkina	Russia	1:27.57	
3rd place, bronze medalist(s)	Anastasiia Antoniak	Ukraine	1:28.76	
4	Csilla Károlyi	Hungary	1:29.28	
5	Kim Bo-kyung	South Korea	1:29.42	
6	Erica Barbon	Italy	1:31.17	
7	Xu Yichuan	China	1:35.03	
8	Shu Chengjing	China	1:38.27	
