= Finswimming at the 2017 World Games – Women's 100 m bi-fins =

Finswimming - Women's Bi-fins 100 m at the 2017 World Games
- Venue: Orbita Indoor Swimming Pool, Wrocław, Poland
- Dates: 22 July 2017
- Competitors: 8 from 5 nations

Medalists
gold medal	(Hungary) Petra Senánszky
silver medal	(Hungary) Krisztina Varga
bronze medal	(Ukraine) Iryna Pikiner

The women's bi-fins 100 m event in finswimming at the 2017 World Games took place on 22 July 2017 at the Orbita Indoor Swimming Pool in Wrocław, Poland.

== Competition format ==
A total of 8 athletes entered the competition. Only final was held.

== Results ==
=== Final ===
Rank	Athlete	Nation	Time	Note
1st place, gold medalist(s)	Petra Senánszky	Hungary	45.16	WR
2nd place, silver medalist(s)	Krisztina Varga	Hungary	46.77	
3rd place, bronze medalist(s)	Iryna Pikiner	Ukraine	46.92	
4	Choi Min-ji	South Korea	47.70	
5	Anna Kharina	Russia	48.42	
6	Kseniia Skrypel	Ukraine	49.22	
7	Weronika Prentka	Poland	49.56	
8	Amelia Pisarczyk	Poland	49.68	
