= 2024 Finswimming World Championships =

- Venue: Sports and Recreational Center "Milan Gale Muškatirović"
- Location: Belgrade, Serbia
- Dates: 12–16 July

The 2024 Finswimming World Championships Indoor were held in Belgrade, Serbia from 12 to 16 July 2024.

== Medal overview ==
=== Men's events ===
Event	Gold		Silver		Bronze	
50 m surface	Mauricio Fernández; Colombia	15.39	Kwon Nam-ho; South Korea	15.59	Stepan Vorobyev; CMAS	15.60
100 m surface	Justus Mörstedt; Germany	34.59	Stepan Vorobyev; CMAS	34.93	Juan Ocampo; Colombia	34.95
200 m surface	Justus Mörstedt; Germany	1:20.29	Juan Ocampo; Colombia	1:20.84	Nándor Kiss; Hungary	1:21.34
400 m surface	Nándor Kiss; Hungary	2:58.00	Alex Mozsár; Hungary	2:58.72	Lee Seong; South Korea	2:59.29
800 m surface	Nándor Kiss; Hungary	6:14.62	Alex Mozsár; Hungary	6:20.65	Lee Seong; South Korea	6:22.20
1500 m surface	Alex Mozsár; Hungary	12:19.14	Oleksii Zakharov; Ukraine	12:34.11	Lee Seong; South Korea	12:34.82
50 m bi-fins	Iurii Sharykin; CMAS	18.69	Marco Orsi; Italy	18.70	Arseniy Desyatov; CMAS	18.91
100 m bi-fins	Aleksei Fedkin; CMAS	41.84	Kelen Cséplő; Hungary	41.87	Szymon Kropidłowski; Poland	42.10
200 m bi-fins	Aleksei Fedkin; CMAS	1:33.45	Kelen Cséplő; Hungary	1:35.21	Kévin Lasserre; France	1:36.17
400 m bi-fins	Aleksei Fedkin; CMAS	3:25.02; WR	Bence Lengyeltóti; Hungary	3:28.74	Clément Batte; France	3:30.55
50 m apnea	Stepan Vorobyev; CMAS	13.92	Zhang Siqian; China	13.99	Shin Myeong-jun; South Korea	14.04
100 m immersion	Shin Myeong-jun; South Korea	31.01; WR	Stepan Vorobyev; CMAS	32.03	Guan Hanzhi; China	32.50
200 m immersion	Guan Hanzhi; China	1:12.86; WR	Justus Mörstedt; Germany	1:13.65	Aleksandr Khudyshkin; CMAS	1:13.99
400 m immersion	Andrei Stiazhkin; CMAS	2:46.48	Georgios Kaltsoukalas; Greece	2:48.63	Yoon Young-joong; South Korea	2:48.84
4 × 50 m surface relay	Colombia; Juan Rodríguez (15.63); Juan Duque (15.32); Mauricio Fernández (14.74); Juan Ocampo (14.93); Juan Moreno^{[a]}	1:00.62; WR	South Korea; Lee Dong-jin (15.48); Shin Myeong-jun (14.86); Jang Hyoung-ho (15.45); Kwon Nam-ho (15.04)	1:00.83	China; Pan Zhenhao (16.89); Wu Enxi (14.62); Wang Zhihao (15.09); Zhang Siqian (14.80)	1:01.40
4 × 100 m surface relay	Colombia; Juan Rodríguez (34.89); Juan Duque (35.16); Mauricio Fernández (34.48); Juan Ocampo (34.02); Juan Giraldo^{[a]} Willington Valencia^{[a]} Juan Moreno^{[a]}	2:18.55	South Korea; Shin Myeong-jun (35.12); Lee Dong-jin (37.85); Jang Hyoung-ho (34.28); Kwon Nam-ho (34.83)	2:22.08	Germany; Justus Mörstedt (35.35); Niklas Loßner (36.88); Max Poschart (34.15); Marek Leipold (35.74); Marcel Porges^{[a]}	2:22.12
4 × 200 m surface relay	Colombia; Juan Ocampo (1:21.00); Juan Giraldo (1:23.06); Willington Valencia (1:24.16); Alexander Jiménez (1:21.81); Jonathan Alonso^{[a]} Juan Rodríguez^{[a]}	5:30.03	Hungary; Alex Mozsár (1:21.46); Nándor Kiss (1:20.26); Bence Lengyeltóti (1:25.81); Ádám Bukor (1:23.15)	5:30.68	South Korea; Lee Seong (1:24.84); Kim Tae-woo (1:27.20); Yoon Young-joong (1:21.61); Jang Hyoung-ho (1:20.35)	5:34.00

^{a} Swimmers who participated in the heats only and received medals.

=== Women's events ===
Event	Gold		Silver		Bronze	
50 m surface	Hu Yaoyao; China	17.11	Xie Wenmin; China	17.32	Diana Sliseva; CMAS	17.40
100 m surface	Hu Yaoyao; China	37.75; WR	Diana Sliseva; CMAS	38.68	Paula Aguirre; Colombia	39.04
200 m surface	Vlada Markina; CMAS	1:28.98	Ekaterina Mikhaylushkina; CMAS	1:29.99	Sofiia Hrechko; Ukraine	1:30.57
400 m surface	Elizaveta Kupressova; CMAS	3:14.13	Sofiia Hrechko; Ukraine	3:18.23	Kuang Shiqing; China	3:18.98
800 m surface	Elizaveta Kupressova; CMAS	6:52.64; WJR	Kuang Shiqing; China	7:01.73	Silvia Sevignani; Italy	7:05.31
1500 m surface	Johanna Schikora; Germany	13:26.77	Eleni Kalfidou; Greece	13:36.09	Polina Nekrasova; CMAS	13:36.35
50 m bi-fins	Huang Mei-chien; Chinese Taipei	21.68	Lilly Placzek; Germany	21.82	Valeriia Andreeva; CMAS Zoé Turucz; Hungary	21.84
100 m bi-fins	Dorottya Pernyész; Hungary	47.34	He Pin-li; Chinese Taipei	48.35	Cao Luwen; China Yevheniia Tymoshenko; Ukraine	48.81
200 m bi-fins	Arina Pantina; CMAS	1:44.99	Iana Martynova; CMAS	1:46.46	Camille Julien; France	1:46.58
400 m bi-fins	Arina Pantina; CMAS	3:45.51	Iana Martynova; CMAS	3:47.86	Jeanne Daniel; France	3:49.66
50 m apnea	Seo Ui-jin; South Korea	16.09	Shu Chengjing; China	16.26	Paula Aguirre; Colombia Diana Sliseva; CMAS	16.30
100 m immersion	Yao Huali; China	34.98	Hu Yaoyao; China	35.18	Yoon Mi-ri; South Korea	36.64
200 m immersion	Yao Huali; China	1:18.05; WR	Xu Yichuan; China	1:21.58	Alina Nalbandian; CMAS	1:24.94
400 m immersion	Yao Huali; China	2:53.99; WR	Anastasiia Iliushina; CMAS	3:00.41	Xu Yichuan; China	3:05.11
4 × 50 m surface relay	China; Xie Wenmin (17.21); Xu Yichuan (16.84); Yao Huali (17.68); Hu Yaoyao (16.39); Shu Chengjing^{[b]}	1:08.12; WR	South Korea; Seo Ui-jin (18.01); Choi Min-ji (17.47); Yoon Mi-ri (17.07); Moon Ye-jin (16.50)	1:09.05	Colombia; Grace Fernández (18.38); Nikol Ortega (16.63); Diana Moreno (17.21); Paula Aguirre (16.94)	1:09.16
4 × 100 m surface relay	China; Hu Yaoyao (38.65); Shu Chengjing (39.62); Xie Wenmin (39.59); Xu Yichuan (38.43)	2:36.29	Colombia; Grace Fernández (39.89); Diana Moreno (39.43); Nikol Ortega (38.82); Paula Aguirre (39.21); Viviana Retamozo^{[b]} María Lopera^{[b]}	2:37.35	Ukraine; Anastasiia Makarenko (40.11); Sofiia Hrechko (39.86); Yelyzaveta Hrechykhina (39.62); Viktoriia Uvarova (38.33)	2:37.92
4 × 200 m surface relay	China; Shu Chengjing (1:34.31); Kuang Shiqing (1:30.15); Hu Yaoyao (1:32.11); Xu Yichuan (1:28.27)	6:04.84	Ukraine; Viktoriia Uvarova (1:33.48); Anna Yakovleva (1:32.18); Anastasiia Makarenko (1:30.97); Sofiia Hrechko (1:31.91)	6:08.54	South Korea; Jung Min-young (1:34.96); Baek Seo-hyun (1:33.09); Yang Ji-won (1:32.08); Moon Ye-jin (1:29.07)	6:09.20

^{b} Swimmers who participated in the heats only and received medals.

=== Mixed events ===
Event	Gold		Silver		Bronze	
4 × 100 m bi-fins-surface relay	Hungary; Kelen Cséplő (41.84); Dorottya Pernyész (46.22); Ádám Bukor (35.36); Sára Suba (38.48); Dávid Mayer^{[c]} Lilla Blaszák^{[c]}	2:41.90; WR	China; Su Mingrui (42.35); Cao Luwen (49.04); Wang Zhihao (34.95); Hu Yaoyao (37.10)	2:43.44	Germany; Max Poschart (42.54); Lilly Placzek (47.87); Justus Mörstedt (34.28); Nadja Barthel (39.28); Marek Leipold^{[c]}	2:43.97
4 × 100 m bi-fins relay	Hungary; Kelen Cséplő (42.10); Dorottya Pernyész (46.80); Larion Lipők (41.72); Sára Suba (47.89); Anna Varnyu^{[c]}	2:58.51	Italy; Patrick Martin (42.99); Giorgia Destefani (46.69); Marco Orsi (40.94); Viola Magoga (48.23); Valter Prampolini^{[c]}	2:58.85	France; Kévin Lasserre (42.53); Emilie Fatras (49.29); Théo De Zaldivar (40.90); Camille Julien (47.69); Jeanne Daniel^{[c]} Clément Batte^{[c]}	3:00.41

^{c} Swimmers who participated in the heats only and received medals.

== Medal table ==
Rank	Nation	Gold	Silver	Bronze	Total
1	CMAS	11	7	8	26
2	China	9	7	5	21
3	Hungary	6	6	2	14
4	Colombia	4	2	4	10
5	Germany	3	2	2	7
6	South Korea	2	4	8	14
7	Chinese Taipei	1	1	0	2
8	Ukraine	0	3	3	6
9	Italy	0	2	1	3
10	Greece	0	2	0	2
11	France	0	0	5	5
12	Poland	0	0	1	1
Totals (12 entries)		36	36	39	111
