= Sofiia Hrechko =

Ukrainian swimmer (born 2005)

Personal information
- Full name: Sofiia Oleksiivna Hrechko
- Born: 21 June 2005 (age 21) Kharkiv, Ukraine

Sport
- Sport: Swimming
- Strokes: Finswimming
Medal record
Event	1st	2nd	3rd
World Games	3	1	2
World Championships	4	5	5
European Championships	6	1	2
Total	13	7	9
Women's finswimming
Representing Ukraine
World Games
Gold medal – first place	2022 Birmingham	200 m surface
Gold medal – first place	2025 Chengdu	200 m surface
Gold medal – first place	2025 Chengdu	400 m surface
Silver medal – second place	2022 Birmingham	400 m surface
Bronze medal – third place	2025 Chengdu	4×50 m surface
Bronze medal – third place	2025 Chengdu	4×100 m surface
World Championships
Gold medal – first place	2022 Cali	4×200 m surface
Gold medal – first place	2022 Cali	400 m surface
Gold medal – first place	2022 Cali	800 m surface
Gold medal – first place	2026 Incheon	800 m surface
Silver medal – second place	2021 Tomsk	4×100 m surface
Silver medal – second place	2021 Tomsk	4×200 m surface
Silver medal – second place	2022 Cali	200 m surface
Silver medal – second place	2024 Belgrade	4×200 m surface
Silver medal – second place	2024 Belgrade	400 m surface
Bronze medal – third place	2021 Tomsk	400 m surface
Bronze medal – third place	2024 Belgrade	4×100 m surface
Bronze medal – third place	2024 Belgrade	200 m surface
Bronze medal – third place	2026 Incheon	400 m surface
Bronze medal – third place	2026 Incheon	4×100 m surface
European Championships
Gold medal – first place	2023 Gödöllő	4×200 m surface
Gold medal – first place	2025 Olsztyn	200 m surface
Gold medal – first place	2025 Olsztyn	400 m surface
Gold medal – first place	2025 Olsztyn	800 m surface
Gold medal – first place	2025 Olsztyn	4×100 m surface
Gold medal – first place	2025 Olsztyn	4×200 m surface
Silver medal – second place	2023 Gödöllő	200 m surface
Bronze medal – third place	2023 Gödöllő	400 m surface
Bronze medal – third place	2025 Olsztyn	4×50 m surface

Sofiia Oleksiivna Hrechko (Ukrainian: Софія Олексіївна Гречко, born 21 June 2005 in Kharkiv) is a Ukrainian finswimmer.

== Career ==
In 2019, Sofiia won a gold medal in the 200 metres surface and a bronze in the 100 metres surface at the World Junior Championships in Sharm El Sheikh.

She competed at the 2021 Finswimming World Championships in Tomsk, winning two silver medals in the 4×100 and 4×200 metres surface relay and a bronze one in the 400 metres surface.

In 2022, at the World Championships in Cali, Sofiia became a three times world champion in the 4×200 metres surface relay and the 400 and 800 metres surface. She also won a silver medal in the 200 metres surface. Later, she won a gold medal in the 200 metres surface and a silver one in the 400 metres surface at the 2022 World Games in Birmingham.

At the 2024 Finswimming World Championships in Budapest Sofiia won two silver medals in the 4×200 metres surface relay and the 400 metres surface. She also won two bronze ones in the 4×100 metres surface relay and the 200 metres surface.
