= Yanina =

Yanina is a feminine given name and a surname. Notable people with the name include:

== Given name ==
- Yanina Aguilar, Costa Rican beach-volleyball player
- Yanina Batyrchina, Russian gymnast
- Yanina González, Paraguayan beauty pageant contestant
- Yanina Iannuzzi, Argentine fencer
- Yanina Wickmayer, Belgian professional tennis player
- Yanina Zhejmo, Soviet actress

== Surname ==
- Irina Yanina, Russian nurse, medical sergeant

== See also ==
- Ioannina or Yannena, city in Greece
