= Finswimming at the 2017 World Games – Women's 50 m bi-fins =

Finswimming - Women's Bi-fins 50 m at the 2017 World Games
- Venue: Orbita Indoor Swimming Pool, Wrocław, Poland
- Dates: 21 July 2017
- Competitors: 8 from 7 nations

Medalists
gold medal	(Hungary) Petra Senánszky
silver medal	(South Korea) Choi Min-ji
bronze medal	(Hungary) Krisztina Varga

The women's bi-fins 50 m event in finswimming at the 2017 World Games took place on 21 July 2017 at the Orbita Indoor Swimming Pool in Wrocław, Poland.

== Competition format ==
A total of 8 athletes entered the competition. Only final was held.

== Results ==
=== Final ===
Rank	Athlete	Nation	Time	Note
1st place, gold medalist(s)	Petra Senánszky	Hungary	20.52	WR
2nd place, silver medalist(s)	Choi Min-ji	South Korea	21.47	
3rd place, bronze medalist(s)	Krisztina Varga	Hungary	21.58	
4	Iryna Pikiner	Ukraine	21.65	
5	Chen Chiao-ying	Chinese Taipei	21.91	
6	Elizaveta Melnikova	Russia	22.09	
7	Silvia Barnes Corominas	Spain	22.19	
8	Amelia Pisarczyk	Poland	22.29	
