= Galija Sattarova =

Estonian underwater swimmer

Personal information
- Born: July 25, 1983 (age 42) Tallinn, then part of Estonian SSR, Soviet Union

Sport
- Sport: Swimming
Medal record
Representing Estonia
World Games
Bronze medal – third place	2005 Duisburg	50m apnoea

Galija Sattarova (born 25 July 1983) is an Estonian underwater finswimmer.

She was born in Tallinn. In 2005 she graduated from Tallinn University of Technology in telecommunications speciality.

She began her swimming career in 1992, coached by Andrei Arno. Since 1997 her coach is Maksim Merkur. In 2004 and 2007 she won bronze medal at world championships. In 2003 she won gold medal at European championships. In 2005 she won bronze medal at World Games in finswimming. She is 52-times Estonian champion in different swimming disciplines. 2000–2010 she was a member of Estonian national swimming team.

Since 2003 she is coaching at the underwater swimming club in Maardu (Estonian: Maardu Allveeujumise Klubi).

In 1998 and 2000-2010 she was named as Best Female Finswimmer of Estonia.
