= Finswimming World Championships =

International event for the underwater sport of finswimming

- Status: active
- Genre: sporting event
- Date: mid-year
- Frequency: biennial
- Country: varying
- Inaugurated: 1976

The Finswimming World Championships is the peak international event for the underwater sport of finswimming. These are conducted on behalf of the sport's governing body, Confédération Mondiale des Activités Subaquatiques (CMAS) by an affiliated national federation.

== Scheduling ==
The championship is split into two events on the basis of age for both male and female swimmers - seniors (i.e. 18 years and older) and juniors (i.e. 12 to 17 years old). The senior championship was first held in 1976 while the junior championship was first held in 1989. From 1976 to 1990, the senior championships were held every four years, except for the championship held in Moscow during 1982, and from 1990 to 2006 it was held every two years. The junior championship has been held every two years from 1993, with the exception of the years 2005 and 2006. As of 2007, the championships have been held every two years, with the senior age group event being held in the odd years starting with 2007, while the junior age group event is held in even years starting with 2008.

== Organization ==
A world championship is conducted at two sites within a geographical locality - one being an olympic-size swimming pool (also known as a long course pool) and the other being an open water site suitable for long-distance finswimming.

The pool competition is carried out over five days with qualifying heats held in the morning and finals held in the afternoon. Races are conducted in the following techniques and distances for both male and female swimmers:

- Surface finswimming (SF) - individual races for distances of 50m, 100m, 200m, 400m, 800m and 1500m, and relays for 4 × 100 m, 4 × 200 m and 4×50 (mixed).
- Bi-Fins (BF, also known as ‘Stereo-fins’) - 50m, 100m, 200m and 400m, and relays for 4×100 (mixed).
- Apnoea finswimming (AP also known as ‘apnea’) - 50m while juniors younger than 14 years old swim only 25m.
- Immersion finswimming (IM) - 100m and 400m.

As of 2014, the long-distance competition is held over one day for senior and juniors swimmers with the following schedule: Morning - 4 x 2 km mixed team relay (2 men and 2 women) and Afternoon - 6 km individual swim. National federations may register a maximum of one relay team and a maximum of four individuals for the 6 km race. Long distance swimming is only open to SF and BF techniques.

== Championships ==
In 1988 to 2005, World Championship in Long Distance Fins (LFD) was also held (World Championships in Long Distance Fins). Since 2006 competitions at all distances have been held at a single world championship.

=== Seniors (+18) ===
Since 1976 (Open Waters events 2016 - 2018):

Edition	Year	Host city	Host country	Events
Pool
1	1976	Hannover	West Germany	21
2	1980	Bologne	Italy	21
3	1982	Moscow	Soviet Union	20
4	1986	West Berlin	West Germany	21
5	1990	Rome	Italy	22
6	1992	Athens	Greece	22
7	1994	Dongguan	China	24
8	1996	Dunaújváros	Hungary	24
9	1998	Cali	Colombia	24
10	2000	Palma de Mallorca	Spain	24
11	2002	Patras	Greece	24
12	2004	Shanghai	China	24
Pool and LFD
13	2006	Turin	Italy	30
14 (Note: Part of 1st CMAS Games)	2007	Bari	Italy	36
15	2009	Saint Petersburg	Russia	36
16	2011	Hódmezővásárhely	Hungary	36
17	2013	Kazan	Russia	36
18	2015	Yantai	China	31
19	2016	Volos	Greece	31
20	2018	Belgrade	Serbia	35
Pool
21	2021	Tomsk	Russia	32
22	2022	Cali	Colombia	32
23	2024	Belgrade	Serbia	36
24	2026	Incheon	South Korea	36

=== LFD (Seniors and Juniors) ===
Edition	Year	Host city	Host country	Events
1	1988	Paris	France	4+0
2	1990	Kavala	Greece	2+0
3	1992	Almelo	Netherlands	2+0
4	1994	Gambarogno	Switzerland	2+2
5	1995	La Ciotat	France	4+4
6	1997	Gdańsk	Poland	2+2
7	1999	San Andrés	Colombia	4+4
8	2001	Ravenna	Italy	6+4
9	2003	Alexandria	Egypt	6+4
10	2005	La Ciotat	France	8+4

=== Juniors (12 - 17) ===
Since 1989 (Open Waters events 2014 - 2019):

Edition	Year	Host city	Host country	Events
Pool
1	1989	Dunaújváros	Hungary	20
2	1993	Lyon	France	27
3	1995	Bratislava	Slovakia	24
4	1997	Balatonfűzfő	Hungary	24
5	1999	Strasbourg	France	24
6	2001	Aguascalientes	Mexico	20
7	2003	Jeju City	South Korea	23
8	2005	Ostrowiec	Poland	36
Pool and LFD
9	2006	Moscow	Russia	38
10	2008	Neiva	Colombia	37
11	2010	Palma de Mallorca	Spain	34
12	2012	Graz	Austria	34
13	2014	Chania	Greece	34
14	2016	Annemasse	France	32
15	2017	Tomsk	Russia	39
16	2019	Sharm El Sheikh	Egypt	35
Pool
17	2021	Lignano Sabbiadoro	Italy	
18	2023	Cairo	Egypt	
19	2025	Chios	Greece	

=== Masters (30 - Over 75) (Pool and Open Waters) ===
Edition	Year	Host city	Host country	Events
1	2019	Ravenna	Italy	139
2	2021	Lignano Sabbiadoro	Italy	
3	2022	Cali	Colombia	
4	2023	Belgrade	Serbia	
5	2024	Carry-le-Rouet	France	
6	2025	El Alamein	Egypt	

=== Open Water (Juniors, Seniors, Masters) ===
Edition	Year	Host city	Host country	Events
1	2021	Santa Marta	Colombia	
2	2022	Viverone	Italy	
3	2024	Marseille	France	
4	2025	El Alamein	Egypt	
