= Petra Senánszky =

Hungarian swimmer (born 1994)

Personal information
- Nationality: Hungarian
- Born: 10 January 1994 (age 32) Budapest, Hungary

Sport
- Sport: Swimming
Medal record
Representing Hungary
Women's swimming
European Championships (LC)
Gold medal – first place	2024 Belgrade	50 m freestyle
Gold medal – first place	2024 Belgrade	4×100 m freestyle
Bronze medal – third place	2024 Belgrade	4×100 m mixed medley
European Championships (SC)
Silver medal – second place	2025 Lublin	4×50 m mixed freestyle
Women's finswimming
World Games
Gold medal – first place	2017 Wrocław	50 m bi-fins
Gold medal – first place	2017 Wrocław	100 m bi-fins
Gold medal – first place	2022 Birmingham	50 m bi-fins
Gold medal – first place	2022 Birmingham	100 m bi-fins
Gold medal – first place	2025 Chengdu	50 m bi-fins
Gold medal – first place	2025 Chengdu	100 m bi-fins
Silver medal – second place	2022 Birmingham	4x100 m surface
Women's lifesaving
World Games
Gold medal – first place	2022 Birmingham	4x50 m obstacle
Silver medal – second place	2022 Birmingham	4x50 m medley

Petra Senánszky (born 10 January 1994) is a Hungarian swimmer. She does finswimming, lifesaving and normal swimming. She competed in the women's 4 × 100 metre freestyle relay event at the 2020 European Aquatics Championships, in Budapest, Hungary, reaching the final.
