= List of Heroes of the Russian Federation (A) =

This is a list of people who have been awarded the title Hero of the Russian Federation.

It has been awarded more than 970 times, of which more than 440 were posthumously.

== List of Heroes of the Russian Federation ==
- Esedulla Abachev (ru)
- Alime Abdenanova
- Raushan Abdullin (ru)
- Magomedshamil Abduragimov
- Kanti Abdurakhmanov
- Nikolai Abramashvili
- Mikhail Abramenko (ru)
- Yuri Abramovich
- Temirlan Abutalimov (ru)
- Sergey Avdeev
- Aleksandr Averkiev (ru)
- Vyacheslav Averyanov (ru)
- Ivan Averyanov (ru)
- Viktor Adamishin
- Arthur Adams
- Gennady Azarychev (ru)
- Aleksandra Akimova
- Aleksandr Aksyonov (ru)
- Apti Alaudinov
- Vladimir Aleksandrov (ru)
- Aleksandr Alekseyev (ru)
- Aleksandr Alekseyev ru)
- Vladimir Alekseev (ru)
- Eduard Alekseev (ru)
- Vladimir Alimov (ru)
- Marat Alykov
- Stanislav Amelin (ru)
- Sergey Amosov (ru)
- Aleksandr Ananichev (ru)
- Gennady Anashkin (ru)
- Aleksandr Andreev (ru)
- Anatoly Andronov (ru)
- Sergey Anikin (ru)
- Yuri Anokhin (ru)
- Andrey Anoshchenkov (ru)
- Aleksandr Antonov (ru)
- Vitaly Antonov
- Oleg Antonovich (ru)
- Ivan Anureev (ru)
- Timur Apakidze
- Maksim Apletalin (ru)
- Aleksandr Apukhtin
- Marem Arapkhanova
- Sergey Arefyev (ru)
- Aleksey Artemyev (ru)
- Oleg Artemyev
- Aleksandr Artyukhin (ru)
- Valery Asapov
- Asker Askerov (ru)
- Aleksandr Astapov (ru)
- Dmitry Astafyev (ru)
- Aleksey Afanasyev
- Vasily Afonin
- Marat Akhmetshin (ru)
- Igor Akhpashev (ru)
- Ivan Akhtyrsky (ru)
- Sergey Ashikhmin (ru)
- Mukhridin Ashurov (ru)

== See also ==
- Awards and decorations of the Russian Federation
- Awards and Emblems of the Ministry of Defense of the Russian Federation
- Awards of the Ministry of Internal Affairs of Russia
- Awards of the Federal Security Service of the Russian Federation
- Awards of the Federal Protective Service of the Russian Federation
- Awards of the Ministry for Emergency Situations of Russia
- Honorary titles of Russia
