= List of Heroes of the Russian Federation (P) =

This is a list of people who have been awarded the title Hero of the Russian Federation.

It has been awarded more than 970 times, of which more than 440 were posthumously.

== List of Heroes of the Russian Federation ==
- Aleksandr Pavlov (ru)
- Valentin Padalka (ru)
- Gennady Padalka
- Sergey Palagin
- Aleksey Palatidi (ru)
- Aleksandr Pankov (ru)
- Andrey Panov (ru)
- Vladislav Panov (ru)
- Aleksandr Panfilov (ru)
- Anatoly Panfilov (ru)
- Ilya Panfilov (ru)
- Vadim Pankov (ru)
- Mikhail Pankov (ru)
- Dmitry Parfyonov (ru)
- Yevgeny Parchinsky (ru)
- Maksim Passar
- Nikolai Patrushev
- David Pashaev (ru)
- Valentin Pashin
- Vasilisa Pashchenko (ru)
- Aleksandr Pegishev (ru)
- Aleksandr Pelikh (ru)
- Sergey Pereslavtsev (ru)
- Sergey Perets
- Dmitry Perminov (ru)
- Aleksandr Perov (ru)
- Vasily Pershikov (ru)
- Pavel Petrachkov (ru)
- Igor Petrikov (ru)
- Aleksandr Petrov (ru)
- Vasily Petrov (ru)
- Dmitry Petrov (ru)
- Mikhail Petrov (ru)
- Oleg Petrov (ru)
- Sergey Petrov (ru)
- Vyacheslav Petrusha (ru)
- Sergey Petrushko (ru)
- Vadim Petukhov (ru)
- Aleksandr Pechnikov (ru)
- Oleg Peshkov
- Vladimir Pismennyy (ru)
- Dmitry Plotnikov (ru)
- Marina Plotnikova
- Sergey Podvalnyy (ru)
- Mikhail Pozdnyakov (ru)
- Aleksandr Poleshchuk
- Dmitry Polkovnikov (ru)
- Valery Polyakov
- Valentin Polyansky (ru)
- Aleksandr Ponomaryov (ru)
- Viktor Ponomaryov (ru)
- Aleksandr Popov (ru)
- Valery Popov (ru)
- Gennady Popov (ru)
- Leonid Popov (ru)
- Denis Portnyagin (ru)
- Vladislav Posadsky (ru)
- Aleksandr Postoyalko (ru)
- Valery Potashov (ru)
- Vitaly Potylintsyn (ru)
- Sergey Preminin
- Andrey Pribytkov (ru)
- Yevgeny Prigozhin
- Fyodor Prokopenko (ru)
- Sergey Prokopyev
- Vladimir Pronichev
- Dmitry Pronyagin (ru)
- Aleksandr Prokhorenko
- Oleg Protsenko (ru)
- Gennady Prusakov (ru)
- Aleksandr Puzinovsky (ru)
- Aleksey Putsykin (ru)
- Sergey Pyatnitskikh (ru)
