= Aksentyevo =

Aksentyevo (Russian: Аксентьево) is the name of several rural localities in Russia.

== Modern localities ==
- Aksentyevo, Kostroma Oblast, a village in Ust-Neyskoye Settlement of Makaryevsky District in Kostroma Oblast; 57°59′N 43°36′E
- Aksentyevo, Moscow Oblast, a village in Borisovskoye Rural Settlement of Mozhaysky District in Moscow Oblast; 55°25′N 35°54′E
- Aksentyevo, Nizhny Novgorod Oblast, a village in Varezhsky Selsoviet of Pavlovsky District in Nizhny Novgorod Oblast
- Aksentyevo, Novgorod Oblast, a village in Yazhelbitskoye Settlement of Valdaysky District in Novgorod Oblast
- Aksentyevo, Pskov Oblast, a village in Pskovsky District of Pskov Oblast
- Aksentyevo, Kuvshinovsky District, Tver Oblast, a village in Tysyatskoye Rural Settlement of Kuvshinovsky District in Tver Oblast
- Aksentyevo, Zapadnodvinsky District, Tver Oblast, a village in Ilyinskoye Rural Settlement of Zapadnodvinsky District in Tver Oblast
- Aksentyevo, Nikolsky District, Vologda Oblast, a village in Krasnopolyansky Selsoviet of Nikolsky District in Vologda Oblast
- Aksentyevo, Nyuksensky District, Vologda Oblast, a village in Bobrovsky Selsoviet of Nyuksensky District in Vologda Oblast
- Aksentyevo, Vashkinsky District, Vologda Oblast, a village in Kisnemsky Selsoviet of Vashkinsky District in Vologda Oblast
- Aksentyevo, Yaroslavl Oblast, a village in Fominsky Rural Okrug of Tutayevsky District in Yaroslavl Oblast

== Alternative names ==
- Aksentyevo, alternative name of Avksentyevo, a village in Soltanovskoye Settlement of Neysky District in Kostroma Oblast; 58°1′N 43°41′E

== See also ==
- Aksentyev, a Russian last name
- Avksentyevo, several rural localities in Kostroma Oblast, Russia
