= Aksyonov (surname) =

Aksyonov (Russian: Аксёнов; masculine) or Aksyonova (Аксёнова; feminine), alternatively spelled Aksenov/Aksenova, is a Russian surname. Variants of this surname include Avksentyev/Avksentyeva (Авксе́нтьев/Авксе́нтьева), Aksanov/Aksanova (Акса́нов/Акса́нова), Aksentyev/Aksentyeva (Аксе́нтьев/Аксе́нтьева), Aksentsev/Aksentseva (Аксе́нцев/Аксе́нцева), Aksentsov/Aksentsov (Аксенцо́в/Аксенцо́ва), Aksyutin/Aksyutina (Аксю́тин/Аксю́тина), Aksyanov/Aksyanova (Акся́нов/Акся́нова), and Oksyonov/Oksyonova (also spelled Oksenov/Oksenova) (Оксёнов/Оксёнова).

All these surnames derive from various forms of the Christian male first name Avksenty (from Greek auxanō, meaning to increase). The following people share this surname:

- Aleksandr Aksyonov (disambiguation), several people
- Aleksey Aksyonov (born 1987), Russian sprint athlete
- Alisa Aksyonova (Алиса Аксёнова) (born 1931), Russian museum director
- Alyona Aksyonova, Uzbekistani shooter participating in the 2004 Summer Olympics
- Anastasia Aksenova (Anastasiya Aksyonova) (born 1990), Russian swimmer
- Antonina Aksyonova, adopted child of Yevgenia Ginzburg, Soviet dissident writer
- Grigoriy Aksenov (Grigory Aksyonov), Kazakhstani participants in the second heat of the 2005 Asian Athletics Championships – Men's 800 metres
- Anastasia Aksenova (Aksyonova) (born 1990), Russian swimmer
- Boris Aksenov (Boris Aksyonov), bass guitarist, one of the original members of Zemlyane, a Soviet/Russian rock band
- Igor Aksyonov (born 1977), Russian association football player
- Irina Aksyonova (born 1962), Soviet Olympic swimmer
- Lyubov Aksenova (Lyubov Aksyonova), Soviet participant in Heat 3 of the 1971 European Athletics Championships – Women's 400 metres
- Lyubov Aksyonova, name of Russian philologist Lyubov Sova after 1979
- Lyudmila Aksyonova (born 1947), Soviet athlete
- Maksim Aksyonov (disambiguation), several people
- Nikolay Aksyonov (born 1970), Russian Olympic rower
- Nikolay Aksenov, Soviet participant in the Continental Final at the 1970 Individual Speedway World Championship
- Ogdo Aksyonova (1936–1995), Dolgan poet, founder of the Dolgan written literature
- Oleksandr Aksyonov (born 1994), Ukrainian association football player
- Pavel Aksyonov, second husband of Yevgenia Ginzburg, Soviet dissident writer and father of writer Vasily Aksyonov
- Pyotr Aksyonov, founder of the Court of Auditors, a historical predecessor of the modern Accounts Chamber of Russia
- Sergei Aksenov (Sergey Aksyonov) (born 1971), Russian politician
- Sergey Aksyonov (born 1972), Prime Minister of Crimea
- Vasily Aksyonov (1932–2009), Soviet/Russian writer
- Vladimir Aksyonov (born 1935), Soviet cosmonaut and double Hero of the Soviet Union
- Yana Aksenova, one of the theremin performers invited to perform songs included into the Teen Age Message, a series of interstellar radio transmissions
- Yekaterina Aksenova, maintainer of the Russian Gov-Gov webblog, a part of Government 2.0
- Yuri Aksenov (Yury Aksyonov) (born 1973), Kazakhstani association football player

== See also ==
- Aksenovo, several rural localities in Russia
- Aksenovka, several rural localities in Russia
