= Aksyutin =

Aksyutin (Russian: Аксю́тин; masculine) or Aksyutina (Аксю́тина; feminine) is a Russian last name, a variant of Aksyonov.

People with the last name

- Oleg Aksyutin, executive director of Gasunie, a project company of South Stream, a planned gas pipeline
- Sergey Aksyutin, Russian shooter participating in the 2004 Summer Olympics

Toponyms

- Aksyutina (rural locality) (or Aksyutino), a rural locality (a village) in Karachevsky District of Bryansk Oblast, Russia; 53°1′N 34°59′E

== See also ==
- Aksyutino, a rural locality (a selo) in Asekeyevsky District of Orenburg Oblast, Russia
