= Aleksandr Aksyonov =

Aleksandr Aksyonov, or variants, may refer to:

- Oleksandr Aksyonov (born 1994), Ukrainian footballer
- Aleksandr Aksyonov (politician) (1924–2009), Soviet politician from Belarus
- Alexandr Axenov (fencer), Kazakhstani fencer, in the 2006 Asian Games and other tournaments
- Alexandr Axenov (water polo), Kazakhstani water polo player, in the 2010 Asian Games and other tournaments
- Aleksandr Aksyonov (pilot) (1984–2022), Russian lieutenant colonel and Hero of the Russian Federation recipient.

== See also ==
- Aksyonov (surname)
