= Asekeyevo =

Asekeyevo (Russian: Асекеево) is the name of several rural localities in Asekeyevsky District of Orenburg Oblast, Russia:

- Asekeyevo (selo), a selo in Asekeyevsky Selsoviet
- Asekeyevo (station), a station in Asekeyevsky Selsoviet
