= Vladimir Kulishov =

- Владимир Кулишов
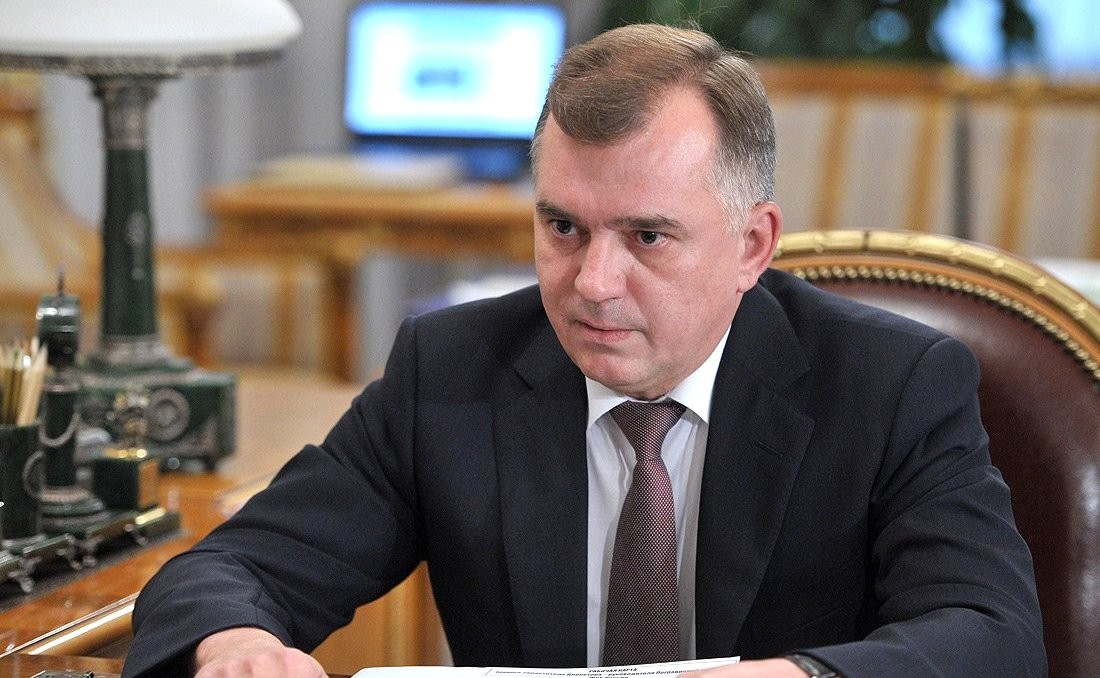
- Kulishov in 2013

First Deputy Director of the FSB Head of the Border Service
- Incumbent
- Assumed office 11 April 2013
- Preceded by: Vladimir Pronichev

Personal details
- Born: Vladimir Grigoriyevich Kulishov; 20 July 1957 (age 68) Rostov Oblast, Russia, Soviet Union
- Party: CPSU (1982—1991)
- Spouse: Inga Leonidovna Kulishova
- Children: 2 sons and a daughter

Military service
- Branch/service: KGB; FSB; FSB Border Service of Russia
- Years of service: 1982—present
- Rank: Army general

Vladimir Grigoriyevich Kulishov (Russian: Владимир Григорьевич Кулишов; born 20 June 1957), is a Russian political military commander who is currently a General of the Army, the First Deputy Director of the Federal Security Service (FSB) and Head of the Border Service since 11 April 2013.

== Biography ==
Vladimir Kulishov was born on 20 July 1957 in the Rostov Oblast. In 1979, he graduated from the Kiev Institute of Civil Aviation Engineers (now the National Aviation University), after which he worked at the Rostov Civil Aviation Plant No. 412. In August 1982, he has been serving in the state security agencies, as he graduated from the Higher School of the KGB of the USSR named after F. E. Dzerzhinsky (now the FSB Academy).

Since 2000, he has worked in the central office of the FSB. Since July 2003, he became the head of the FSB in the Saratov Oblast. In 2004, 1st Deputy Head of the Department for Combating Terrorism of the 2nd Service of the FSB, later Head of the Department of the FSB for the Chechen Republic.

From August 2008 to March 2013, he was the deputy director of the FSB - Chief of Staff of the National Anti-Terrorism Committee.

In March 2013, TASS and RIA novisti first reported that Kulishov had been appointed as the First Deputy Director of the FSB - Head of the Border Guard Service of the FSB. He officially took office on 11 April.

== Sanctions ==
On October 6, 2022, against the backdrop of Russia's invasion of Ukraine, Kulishov was included in the EU sanctions list for "supporting and implementing actions and policies that undermine or threaten the territorial integrity, sovereignty and independence of Ukraine." The European Union notes that under the leadership of Kulishov, employees of the Border Guard Service of the FSB of the Russian Federation took part in systematic "filtration" operations and forcible deportations of Ukrainians from the occupied territories of Ukraine, in addition, Russian border guards illegally subjected citizens of Ukraine to lengthy interrogations, searches and detentions.

He is also included in the sanctions lists of Switzerland, Canada, Australia, and New Zealand.

== Personal life ==
His wife, Inga Leonidovna Kulishova lives and works in Moscow. The couple has two sons and a daughter.
