= Olga Kachura =

Ukrainian separatist military officer (1970–2022)

Colonel Olga Kachura
- Ольга Качура
- Kachura in 2022
- Born: 12 May 1970; Donetsk, Ukrainian SSR, Soviet Union
- Died: 29 July 2022 (aged 52); Horlivka, Donetsk Oblast, Ukraine
- Military career
- Allegiance: Ukraine; Donetsk People's Republic
- Branch: Militsiya; DPR People's Militia
- Service years: 1996–2012; 2014–2022
- Rank: Lieutenant colonel; Colonel
- Nickname: Korsa
- Conflicts: Russo-Ukrainian War; War in Donbas; Russian invasion of Ukraine †
- Awards: Hero of the Donetsk People's Republic; Hero of the Russian Federation

Olga Sergeevna Kachura (Note: Russian: Ольга Сергеевна Качура; Ukrainian: Ольга Сергіївна Качура, romanized: Olha Serhiivna Kachura) (12 May 1970 – 29 July 2022) was a Ukrainian pro-Russian separatist in the Russo-Ukrainian War, colonel of the Donetsk People's Republic People's Militia and a commander of a rocket artillery divizion. She was known under the call sign Korsa.

In 2022, Kachura was sentenced by a Ukrainian court to 12 years in prison in absentia, for serving in the DPR army, which Ukraine considers as a terrorist organisation.

== Early life and education ==
Kachura was born on 12 May 1970 in Donetsk. Her family had a history of military service, with her father and grandfather being officers. She graduated from the military department of the Donetsk Polytechnic Institute with a degree in software development for ballistic missile guidance systems.

== Career ==
She worked in the Ministry of Internal Affairs of Ukraine from 1996 to 2012, rising from an investigator to the chief of staff of the Kirov regional department of the Donetsk city police department, and attaining the rank of lieutenant colonel of the Militsiya. Afterwards she worked in the security service of a bank in Donetsk, until 2014 when she joined the DPR People's Militia.

=== Russo-Ukrainian War ===
Kachura was a participant in the Russo-Ukrainian War from 2014 onwards. She served in the 3rd separate motorized rifle brigade "Berkut" of the 1st army corps of the Donetsk People's Republic (DPR). She commanded a rocket artillery divizion. In January 2022, Kachura was sentenced by a Ukrainian court to 12 years in prison in absentia, for serving in the DPR army, which Ukraine considers a terrorist organisation.

==== Allegations of war crimes ====
Ukrainian authorities accused Kachura of war crimes. According to Ukrainian journalist Denis Kazanskyi, "Kachura was guilty of the shelling of the cities of Donbas and the deaths of civilians". Allegedly, Kachura's artillery divizion had fired on civilian targets during service in the Donetsk People's Republic. She admitted to conducting artillery tasks impersonating Ukrainian soldiers in order to discredit the Ukrainian army. Kachura was reported to have said in an interview with Russian state media that she enjoyed killing her fellow Ukrainians.

== Personal life ==
At the time of her death, Kachura was married, had a daughter and a son that she decided to adopt in 2015 after a priest made her his godmother. She was engaged in powerlifting and headed the Horlivka Powerlifting Federation.

== Death ==
Kachura was killed when a Ukrainian missile struck her car on 29 July 2022 in Horlivka. Her death was announced on 3 August 2022. Posthumously, she was awarded the honorary title Hero of the Russian Federation, "for her courage and heroism shown in the performance of military duty."

According to Russian state media, Kachura's funeral (which took place in Donetsk in August 2022) was bombed by Ukrainian forces, killing two people. The Ukrainian government denied responsibility and claimed that Russian forces had carried out the shelling.

== See also ==
- List of female Heroes of the Russian Federation
