= Aksanov =

Aksanov (Russian: Акса́нов; masculine) or Aksanova (Акса́нова; feminine) is a Russian surname, a variant of Aksyonov. Notable people with the surname include:

- Sultan Aksanov (b. 1993), Russian association football player

== See also ==
- Aksanovo, a rural locality (a village) in Mozhaysky District of Moscow Oblast, Russia
