= Nina Brusnikova =

Hero of the Russian Federation

- Нина Брусникова
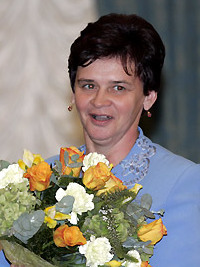
- Brusnikova in 2006
- Born: 16 October 1960; Pankratovo, Gryazovetsky raion, Vologda oblast
- Citizenship: USSR → Russia
- Awards: Hero of the Russian Federation

Nina Vladimirovna Brusnikova (Russian: Нина Владимировна Брусникова; born 16 October 1960) is a member of United Russia's Supreme Council. Currently retired from farmwork, she became a recipient of the title Hero of the Russian Federation in 2006 for her actions fighting a fire at the livestock complex she worked at.

== Biography ==
Born on 16 October 1960 to a large Russian peasant family in Pankratovo, Gryazovetsky raion, Vologda oblast. Having graduated from the Vologda Agricultural College in 1980, she initially worked as a cashier on the Sidorovsky sovkhoz and then as nanny at a daycare on the Aurora sovkhoz before becoming a milking machine operator in the livestock complex at the farm. On 24 April 2006 she noticed a fire growing in the livestock complex; she rushed to save the animals from the inferno and did her best to fight off the flames until the arrival of firefighters, who said the fire would have been much worse had she not taken action. On 5 October that year she was awarded the title Hero of the Russian Federation, and the next day she was presented with the gold star in an awards ceremony at the Kremlin. After working in agriculture and animal husbandry for several decades she retired in October 2015; she is now a resident of Yevdokimovo, Gryazovetsky raion and a member of the Supreme Council of the United Russia Party.

== See also ==
- List of female Heroes of the Russian Federation
