= Sergey Palagin =

Russian military pilot (1968–2020)

Sergey Vyacheslavovich Palagin
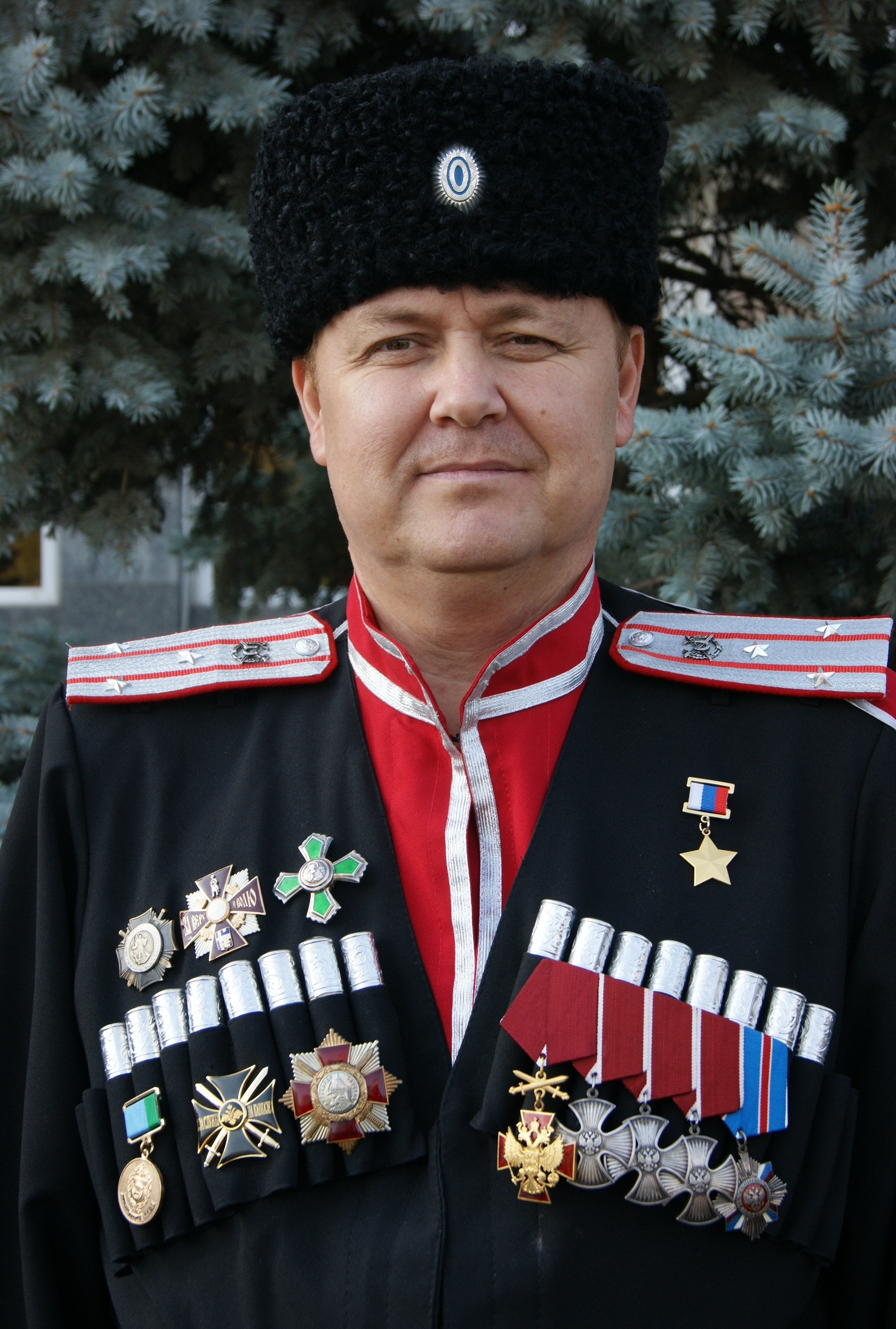
- Palagin in 2015 in Krasnodar, Russia
- Born: March 26, 1968; Saratov, USSR
- Died: 6 November 2020 (aged 52); Krasnodar, Krasnodar Krai, Russian Federation

Sergey Vyacheslavovich Palagin (Russian: Серге́й Вячесла́вович Пала́гин; 26 March 1968 — 6 November 2020) was a Russian military pilot, lieutenant colonel and combatant during the Ossetian–Ingush conflict, First Chechen War, Second Chechen War, the war in Dagestan, and the Russo-Georgian War. He was awarded the title Hero of the Russian Federation in 2004.

== Biography ==
Over his time in service of the Russian Military (1985–2014), Palagin earned the nickname "Brother" (Russian: Братишка), given to him by soldiers who were often rescued by his experienced helicopter crew in critical situations. He flew an Mi-8 model helicopter.

Palagin died from complications of COVID-19 on 6 November 2020, during the COVID-19 pandemic in Russia. He was 52 years old.

== Awards ==
- Hero of the Russian Federation (by order of the President of Russia of 6 April 2004, Gold Star medal No. 818).
- Order "For Merit to the Fatherland" (4th class with Swords).
- Three Orders of Courage (1996, 2000 and 2002).
- Order of Military Merit.
- Multiple medals, including:
  - Medal "For Courage" (ru) (2006);
  - Medal "For Battle Merit";
  - Medal of Nesterov;
  - Medal "For Military Valor" (ru) (First (2002) and Second (2001) class);
  - Medal "For Strengthening the Military Commonwealth" (ru);
  - Medal "For Distinction in Military Service" (ru) (1st, 2nd and 3rd class);
  - Medal "For Service in the Air Force" (ru);
  - Medal "100 years of the Air Force".
- Badge "For Service in the Caucasus" from the Border Service of the Federal Security Service of the Russian Federation.
- Order of St. Sergius of Radonezh (ru) (3rd class).
- Order of Saint Anna (3rd class (2018)).
- Medal "For Services to the Stavropol Territory".
- The title: "Honorary Citizen of the city of Krasnodar" (ru) (2016).

== See also ==
- List of Heroes of the Russian Federation
