= Aksentyev =

Aksentyev (Russian: Аксе́нтьев; masculine) or Aksentyeva (Аксе́нтьева; feminine) is a Russian last name, a variant of Aksyonov.

People with the last name

- M. S. Aksentyeva, editorial manager of Physics-Uspekhi, a Russian journal of physics
- Zinaida Aksentyeva, Russian astronomer after whom Aksentyeva, a crater on Venus, is named

Toponyms

- Aksentyeva, alternative name of Aksentyevo, a village in Borisovskoye Rural Settlement of Mozhaysky District in Moscow Oblast; 55°25′N 35°54′E

== See also ==
- Eftim Aksentiev (b. 1985), Macedonian association football player
- Aksentyevo, several rural localities in Russia
