= Asekeyevo (rural locality) =

Rural locality in Russia

Asekeyevo Асекеево
- Selo
- Interactive map of Asekeyevo
- Location of Asekeyevo Asekeyevo (Orenburg Oblast)
- Coordinates: 53°34′31″N 52°48′12″E
- Country: Russia
- Federal subject: Orenburg Oblast
- Administrative district: Asekeyevsky District
- SettlementSelsoviet: Asekeyevo Settlement
- Elevation: 86 m (282 ft)

Population (2010 Census)
  - Total: 5,201
  - Estimate (2021): 4,907 (−5.7%)

Administrative status
  - Capital of: Asekeyevsky District, Asekeyevo Settlement

Municipal status
  - Municipal district: Asekeyevsky Municipal District
  - Rural settlement: Asekeyevsky Selsoviet Rural Settlement
  - Capital of: Asekeyevsky Municipal District, Asekeyevsky Selsoviet Rural Settlement
- Time zone: UTC+5 (MSK+2)
- Postal code: 461710
- OKTMO ID: 53607407101

Asekeyevo (Russian: Асекеево) is a rural locality (a selo) and the administrative center of Asekeyevsky District of Orenburg Oblast, Russia. Population: 5,201 (2010 census); 5,296 (2002 census); 5,079 (1989 Soviet census).
