= List of female Heroes of the Russian Federation =

This is a list of female Heroes of the Russian Federation; of the over 1,000 people awarded the title, 21 are women.

Name	Date	Feat	References
Alime Abdenanova	1 September 2014	Reconnaissance scout in World War II	
Aleksandra Akimova	31 December 1994	Squadron navigator in the "Night Witches"	
Marem Arapkhanova	3 June 2003	Alerted her town to presence of rebels in Second Chechen War	
Lyudmila Bolilaya	22 May 2025	Medic in Russo-Ukrainian War	
Nina Brusnikova	5 October 2006	Farm worker who fought a fire	
Yekaterina Budanova	1 October 1993	Fighter pilot during World War II	
Lona Cohen	15 June 1996	Spied on the United States	
Natalya Kachuevskaya	12 May 1997	Medic in World War II	
Olga Kachura	4 August 2022	Russo-Ukrainian War	
Anna Kikina	3 April 2024	Cosmonaut	
Yelena Kondakova	10 April 1995	Cosmonaut	
Valentina Kravchenko	10 April 1995	Navigator in 125th Guards Bomber Aviation Regiment	
Larisa Lazutina	27 February 1998	Olympic ski champion	
Vasilisa Pashchenko	16 August 2021	Gunner/radio-operator on A-20 bomber during World War II	
Marina Plotnikova	25 August 1992	Rescued three children from drowning	
Yelena Serova	15 February 2016	Cosmonaut	
Lidiya Shulaykina	1 October 1993	Il-2 pilot in World War II	
Tatyana Sumarokova	11 October 1995	Squadron navigator in the "Night Witches"	
Vera Voloshina	6 May 1994	Partisan in World War II	
Lyubov Yegorova	22 April 1994	Olympic ski champion	
Irina Yanina	14 October 1999	Medic in War of Dagestan	
