= Khabarovsk Border Institute of the FSB of the Russian Federation =

Russian military academy

- Хабаровский пограничный институт ФСБ России
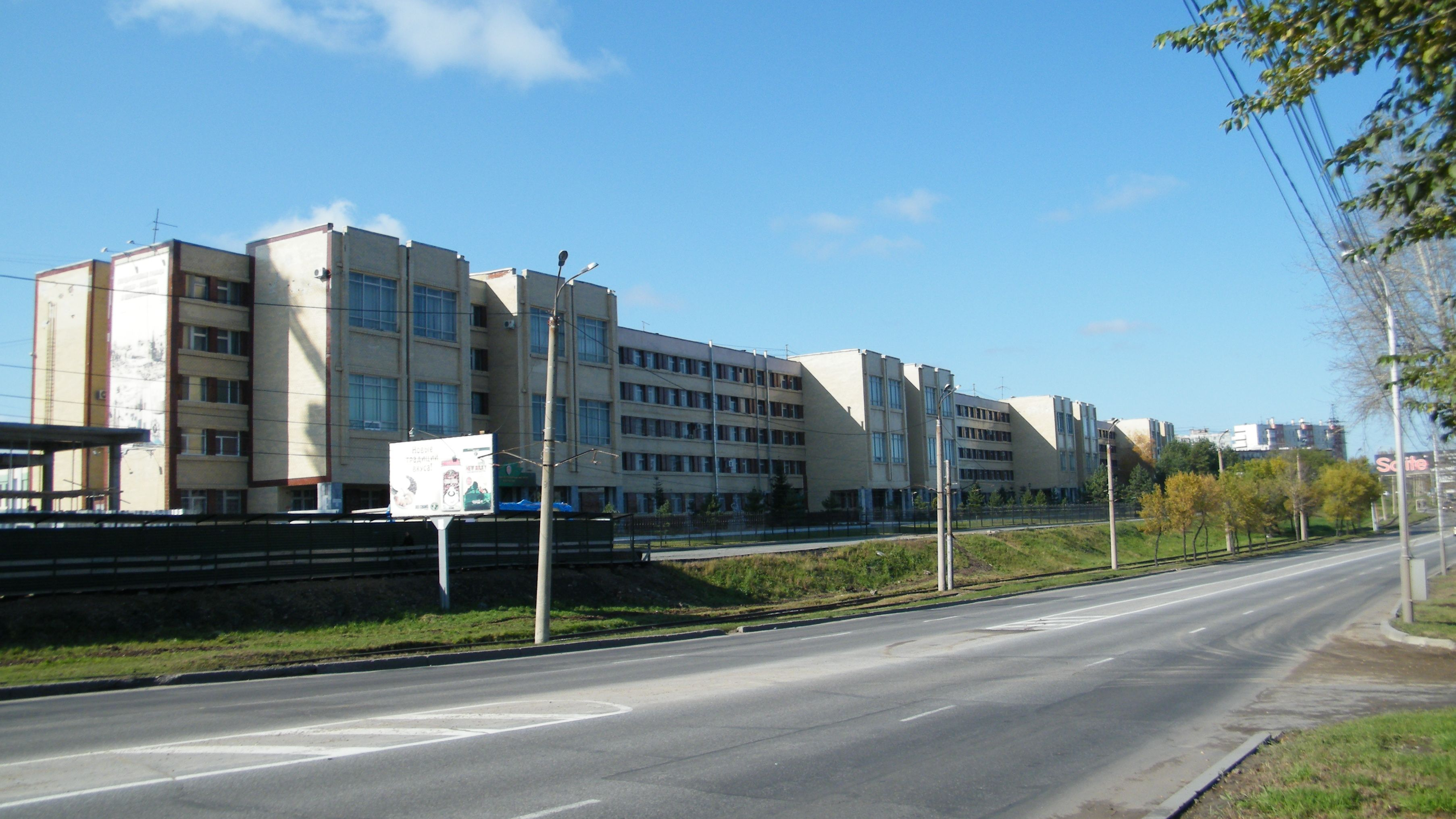
- Former names: KGB Moscow Higher Frontier Guards Command Academy
- Type: military academy
- Established: May 5, 1993
- Affiliations: FSB Border Service
- Location: 85 Bolshaya str., Khabarovsk, Kharovsk Krai, 680017, Russia; 48.5038111838°N 135.082833542°E

Khabarovsk Border Institute of the FSB of the Russian Federation (Russian: Хабаровский пограничный институт ФСБ России) is a federal state educational institution of higher professional education for the training of officers for the Border Service of the Federal Security Service of the Russian Federation.

== History ==
The Khabarovsk Military Institute of the Federal Border Service of the Russian Federation was established on May 5, 1993, in accordance with the Decree No. 421 of the Council of Ministers of the Russian Federation, on the basis of the Khabarovsk Higher Military Construction School (founded in 1981).

After the transfer of border agencies to the Federal Security Service, the Khabarovsk Military Institute of the Federal Border Service was renamed the Khabarovsk Border Institute of the Federal Security Service of the Russian Federation by order of the Government of the Russian Federation dated October 24, 2003 No. 1535.
