= Natalya Kachuevskaya =

Russian combat medic

- Наталья Александровна Качуевская
- Born: 22 February 1922; Petrograd, RSFSR
- Died: 20 November 1942 (aged 20); Хulxatu, Kalmyk ASSR, RSFSR, USSR
- Military career
- Allegiance: Soviet Union
- Branch: Red Army
- Rank: Private
- Conflicts: World War II †
- Awards: Hero of the Russian Federation

Natalya Aleksandrovna Kachuevskaya née Spirova (Russian: Наталья Александровна Качуевская; 22 February 1922 – 20 November 1942) was a combat medic in the Red Army during World War II who committed suicide with a grenade when surrounded, taking out several enemy soldiers in her death as well as avoiding capture. She was posthumously awarded the title Hero of the Russian Federation in 1997.

== Early life ==
Born on 22 February 1922 to a Russian family in Petrograd, she grew up with heavy influence of the theater arts since her mother and aunts were actresses. Shortly after her birth her family moved to Moscow, where she graduated from her tenth grade of school in 1940 before entering the State Institute of Theater Arts.

== World War II ==
The theater school she had completed one semester at was evacuated to Saratov in 1941; there, she organized the development of a frontline concert brigade with fellow students. They gave concerts to military stations and hospitals. During one of those concerts in a Moscow hospital she met her soon-to-be husband Pavel Kachuevsky, a partisan since September 1941 who had been recently evacuated from the front after being wounded in battle with surrounding German forces. They married in spring 1942, shortly before Pavel was sent back to combat, having been assigned to a new partisan detachment. Wanting to go with her husband, she requested to be deployed with him, but was denied, and he was soon killed in action while attacking a German convoy in Gomel on 4 July 1942. However, her hope of being sent to the frontlines was soon realized; in summer that year she graduated from training for snipers and medics aimed at volunteers recruited from the Komsomol. Initially she was assigned to the 16th Airborne Brigade, which was transformed into the 105th Guards Rifle Regiment in August 1942. The unit was posted to an area of Kalmykia where a gap between the Southeastern Front and part of the Transcaucasian Front had formed. Deployed to the warfront in September 1942 as a medic in the 105th Guards Rifle Regiment, she briefly fought on the Southeastern Front that month before going on the Stalingrad Front, seeing combat in the Battle of Stalingrad.

On 20 November her unit engaged in an offensive to encircle enemy forces. While tending to a group of wounded soldiers in a recently retaken dugout, she saw through the broken door in the dugout a sizable force of German soldiers advancing across the steppe. Taking satchel of grenades and a machine gun belonging to one of the wounded, she ran out from the dugout towards a hill to distract the Germans, who opened fire on her. Despite her wounds, she reached the hill and positioned herself to return fire, taking out several German soldiers before running out of bullets. When the Germans came close to her, she detonated her grenades, killing herself while taking out enemy soldiers surrounding her.

== Posthumous recognition ==
Not awarded the title Hero of the Soviet Union during the war unlike other people who did similar feats, she was eventually posthumously awarded the Medal "For Courage" on 19 February 1996 before receiving the title Hero of the Russian Federation on 12 May 1997. Nevertheless, she was honored and celebrated in numerous ways before receiving the title, with streets, a young pioneer squad, and a minor planet named in her honor.

== See also ==
- List of female Heroes of the Russian Federation
