= Irina Yanina =

Russian nurse and medical sergeant

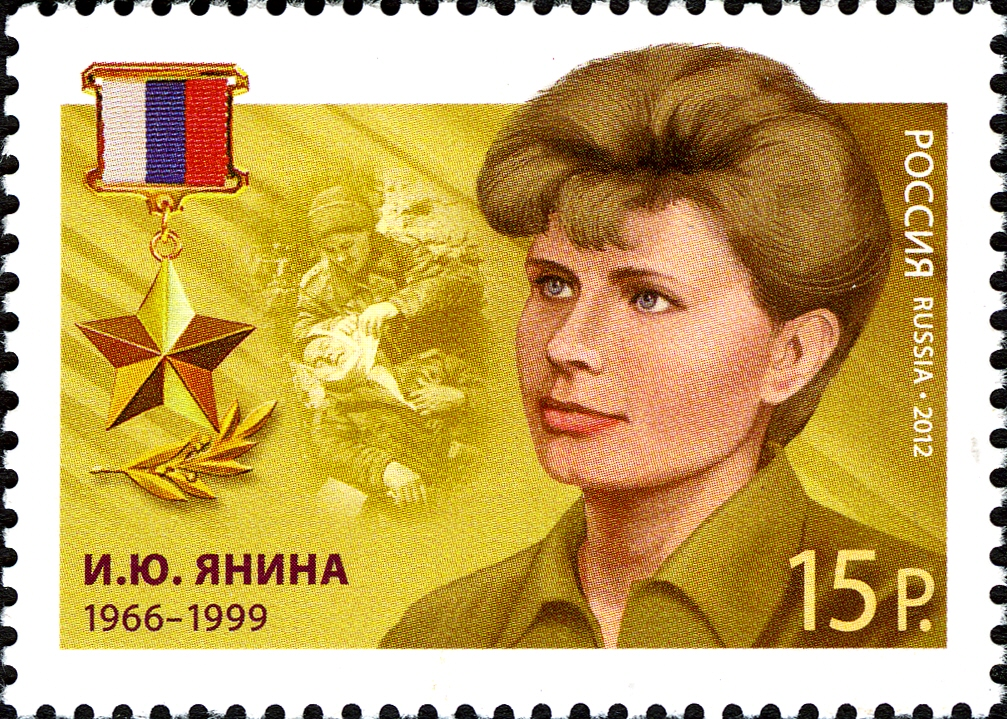
- Yanina on a 2012 Russian stamp
- Born: 27 November 1966; Taldy-Kurgan, Kazakh SSR, USSR
- Died: 31 August 1999 (aged 32); Karamakhi, Republic of Dagestan, Russian Federation
- Military career
- Allegiance: Russia
- Branch: Internal Troops of the Ministry of Internal Affairs
- Service years: 1995–1999
- Rank: Sergeant
- Unit: 22nd Operational Brigade
- Conflicts: First Chechen War; War of Dagestan
- Awards: Hero of the Russian Federation

Irina Yuryevna Yanina (Russian: Ири́на Ю́рьевна Я́нина; 27 November 1966 – 31 August 1999) was a Russian nurse, medical sergeant and Hero of the Russian Federation.

== Biography ==
Irina Yanina was born in the town of Taldy-Kurgan, Kazakh Soviet Socialist Republic. After graduating from a medical school, Irina Yanina worked as a nurse’s assistant and a nurse in a tuberculosis dispensary and in a maternity hospital.

== Military service ==
In 1995 she enlisted in the Russian Internal Troops of the Ministry of Internal Affairs (Russia). She served as a nurse in a medical company of the 22nd Operational Brigade in the town of Kalach-na-Donu. During the First Chechen War Irina made two tours of duty to the area of conflict. During the Second Chechen War her unit deployed to Dagestan in July 1999.

=== Death ===
On 31 August 1999, Sgt Yanina was with an evacuation group which rendered assistance to wounded soldiers during the battle for Karamakhi village. At the risk of her life she gave medical help to 15 wounded soldiers. Moreover, she rode into the battle in APC under heavy enemy fire for three times and managed to save twenty-eight soldiers of federal forces.

When she was trying to access the wounded for the fourth time, the enemy changed over to offensive tactics. Irina Yanina organized the shipping of wounded and covered the operation with fire from an assault rifle. While their APC was moving away from the area it was hit by rocket-propelled grenades and set on fire. Sgt Yanina had successfully helped the wounded to get out of the burning vehicle, but couldn’t manage to leave it herself and died in the fire. For her bravery, Sgt Yanina was permanently added into her unit’s muster roll.

== See also ==
- List of female Heroes of the Russian Federation
