= Aksentyevo, Nikolsky District, Vologda Oblast =

Aksentyevo Аксентьево
- Village
- Location within Vologda Oblast Location within Russia
- Coordinates: 59°33′N 45°25′E
- Country: Russia
- Region: Vologda Oblast
- District: Nikolsky District
- Time zone: UTC+3:00

Aksentyevo (Russian: Аксентьево) is a rural locality (a village) in Krasnopolyanskoye Rural Settlement, Nikolsky District, Vologda Oblast, Russia. The population was 124 as of 2002.

== Geography ==
Aksentyevo is located 3 km (1.9 mi) northwest of Nikolsk (the district's administrative centre) by road. Sokolovo is the nearest rural locality.
