= Lyubov Sova =

Russian linguist

Ljubov Zinovjevna Sova (Russian: Любовь Зиновьевна Сова) (Aksenova since 1979) is a Russian philologist notable for contributions in the field of linguistics and orientalistics. Her main fields of professional interest include linguistics, African philology, semiotics, typology, Slavic languages and journalism.

== Education ==
Sova was born in 1937 in Kharkov in what was then Soviet Ukraine. She recvied her BA in English language from the Kharkov State Courses for Foreign Languages (1958). She received her MA in philology (Russian language and literature) from the Karazin Kharkiv National University (1960). MA in mathematics from the Saint Petersburg State University (1969). PhD in philological science (structural linguistics and African languages) from the Higher Attestation Commission of the USSR (1965); where her thesis was entitled Verb Classes in the Zulu Language. She received her D. Habilitatus and D.Phil. from the Higher Attestation Commission of the USSR (1977) with a thesis entitled Analytical Linguistics

She received academic honors from the Higher Attestation Commission of the USSR and the Academy of Sciences of the USSR in recognition of achievements in comparative and historic linguistics and typology (1984).

== Career ==
Sova has worked progressively as an assistant professor, full professor and leading full professor at the Leningrad Branch of the Linguistic Institute of the Academy of Sciences of the USSR from 1964 to 1990. Since 1990, she has worked as a writer and journalist, and has been editor of the Berlin journal Good Evening! since 1997. She has also continued to work in academia as a visiting professor at various colleges and universities in Berlin.

=== Research ===
Sova's main areas of experience and expertise include analytical linguistics, African philology, Russian language and literature, Slavic languages, semiotics, general, historical, typologic and computational linguistics, syntax, semantics, philosophy and journalism. Sova was among the first researchers to apply computer analysis to the area of philology, and in her D. Habil. thesis, created a theory that she termed "Analytical Linguistics" to apply techniques of constructive mathematics to linguistic materials. Her work has been described as "extending the aims of the generative grammars, [to] set its aim to describe the apparatus of extracted axioms" and was a key factor in the reconstruction of the Proto-Bantu language and the description of the evolution of the Bantu languages.

== Publications ==
Sova is the author of 200 published and unpublished works, two novels and thirteen scientific monographs, including:

=== Scientific monographs ===
- Analytical Linguistics (In English). St. Petersburg. 2012. 370 p.
- Africanistics and Evolutional Linguistics (In Russian). St. Petersburg. 2008. 397 p.
- Studies in Zulu (In Russian). St. Petersburg. 2008. 226 p.
- Analytical Linguistics and Typology (In Russian). St. Petersburg. 2007. 378 p.
- Linguistics of Synthesis (In Russian). St. Petersburg. 2007. 420 p.
- At the Dawn of Language and Thinking. The Origin of African Languages (In Russian). St. Petersburg. 1996. 384 p.
- Comparative Grammar of the Bantu Languages (The System of Noun Classes) (In Russian). 480 p. (In manuscript).
- Morphology of the Zulu Language (In Russian). 400 p. (In manuscript).
- Referential Classification of the Russian Nouns (In Russian). 600 p. (In manuscript).
- Bantu Grammatical Structure Evolution (in Russian). Leningrad. 1987. 360 p.
- Analytical Linguistics (In Russian). Moscow. 1970. 255 p.
- Zulu Configurational Syntax. In 2 parts (in Russian). Leningrad. Part 1. 1968. 209 p.; Part 2. 1969. 299 p.
- The Verb Classes in the Zulu Language (In Russian). Leningrad: Nauka, 1965, 15 p. (Doctoral dissertation abstract). Unpublished doctoral dissertation (In Russian) in two volumes: V. 1. 521 p. V. 2. 497 p.

=== Novels and stories (selected) ===
- Our People in Berlin (In Russian). St. Petersburg. 2004. 188 p.
- Eurofall (In Russian) (together with E. Vertel). 1st ed. Journal "Neva". N 11. 2003. 2nd ed. St. Petersburg. 2004. 178 p. 3rd ed. RJ.
- Ich, Albert Eistein... (In German) //Neue Literatur. Anthologie im Herbst 2004. Frankfurt A/M. 2004. S. 11-18.
- Berlin Stories. 1997–1999 (In Russian). Berlin. 2001. 56 p.
- In the Next World. (In Russian). 1st ed. in: Guten Abend! N. 1-6. Berlin, 1996–1999. 2nd ed. St. Petersburg. Publishing House "Neva". 2000. 340 p. 3rd ed. Altaspera Publishing & Literary Agency. Huntsville, Ontario, Canada. 2012, 242 p.
