= Vasilisa Pashchenko =

- Василиса Сергеевна Пащенко
- Born: 1923; Millerovo, RSFSR, USSR
- Died: 19 April 1945 (aged 21–22); South Moravian Region, Czechoslovakia
- Military career
- Allegiance: Soviet Union
- Branch: Soviet Air Force
- Service years: 1942–1945
- Rank: Junior sergeant
- Unit: 452nd Bomber Aviation Regiment
- Conflicts: World War II †
- Awards: Hero of the Russian Federation

Vasilisa Sergeevna Pashchenko (Russian: Василиса Сергеевна Пащенко; 1923 – 19 April 1945) was a radio operator in the Soviet Air Force during World War II who was posthumously awarded the title Hero of the Russian Federation in 2021.

== Biography ==
Born to a Russian peasant family in Millerovo in 1923, she went on to enlist in the Red Army in 1942 to aid the war effort during the ongoing fight against the German occupation of the Soviet Union. Originally assigned to the 432nd Airfield Service Battalion, after graduating training for radio-operator/gunners in 1944 she was reassigned to the 452nd Bomber Aviation Regiment of the 218th Bomber Aviation Division. There, she entered combat, and in March 1945 she was awarded the Order of the Red Star for participating in 25 sorties, of which 16 were over Budapest.

On 19 April 1945, the A-20 bomber she was flying as radio operator was hit by a barrage of anti-aircraft fire while approaching the Czech city of Brno. The pilot in command ordered the crew to bail out, but only the navigator was able to bail out over land controlled by Soviet forces. Pashchenko remained in the plane while the pilot attempted an emergency landing, but he was killed in the crash. Having miraculously survived the crash and with nobody else to fight off the axis troops approaching the crash site, she remained in the machine-gun turret and opened fire on the approaching soldiers, and then shot herself after running out of ammunition. Initially she was buried in Vedrovice, close to the place of her last stand, but in 1946 her remains were transferred to a military cemetery in Orzhekhov, where over a thousand Soviet soldiers who died in the liberation of Czechoslovakia were buried. On 16 August 2021, she was posthumously awarded the title Hero of the Russian Federation.

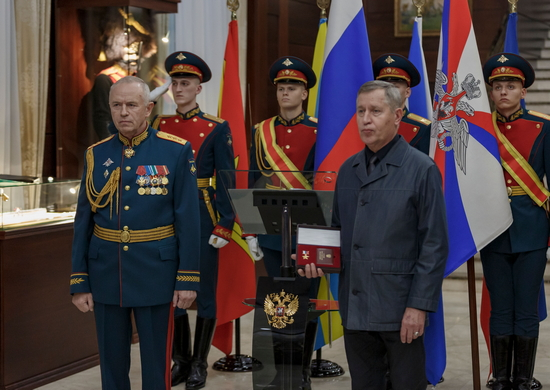
Ceremony of delivery of the Gold Medal of Hero of the Russian Federation to the nephew of the pilot Vasilisa Pashchenk, in a solemn act at the Ministry of Defense of Russia

== See also ==
- List of female Heroes of the Russian Federation
