= Marem Arapkhanova =

Primary school teacher

- Марем Арапханова
- Born: 20 April 1963; Alkun, Sunzhensky District, Chechen-Ingush ASSR, RSFSR, USSR
- Died: 26 September 2002 (aged 39); Galashki, Ingushetia, Russia
- Awards: Hero of the Russian Federation

Marem Akhmetovna Arapkhanova (Russian: Марем Ахметовна Арапханова; Ingush: Арапхананаькъан Марем, romanized: Arapkhananakan Marem; 20 April 1963 – 26 September 2002) was a primary school teacher in Ingushetia who was posthumously awarded the title Hero of the Russian Federation for taking on Chechen militants under the command of Ruslan Gelayev during the invasion of Galashki. She is the first Caucasian woman awarded the title.

== Biography ==
Arapkhanova was born on 20 April 1963 to an Ingush family in the village of Alkun in the Soviet Union. She became a primary school teacher in 1996, having completed secondary school in 1981.

During the night of 26 September 2002, roughly 150 heavily armed militants entered the town of Galashki through Georgia and began looting Ingush properties, seeking to replenish their food supply before a reconnaissance mission. Upon being woken up by the noise of a group of looters breaking into household and ransacking the kitchen for food, Marem attempted to drive away the militants by screaming loudly at them and began to take back bags of flour and potatoes stolen from her house — waking up many of her neighbors and foiling the militants plans to quietly pass through Galashki. She had told her young children and husband, Akhmed Khamkhoev, to stay in the cellar for their own safety, but upon hearing her screams Akhmed left the cellar to come to her aid. The militants intended to silence her by shooting at her husband, but Marem jumped in front of him, and fatally absorbed the machine-gun fire. Her screams and the commotion that followed had alerted the neighbors forced the militants to leave Galashki. She was posthumously declared a Hero of the Russian Federation on 3 June 2003 for warning the neighborhood of the presence of the militants and foiling their mission at the cost of her own life. A school in Magas was named in her honor.

== See also ==
- List of female Heroes of the Russian Federation
