= FSB Border Service of Russia =

Border guard branch of the Russian Federal Security Service

Border Service of the FSB of the Russian Federation Пограничная служба Федеральной службы безопасности Российской Федерации
- Emblem of the FSB Border Service

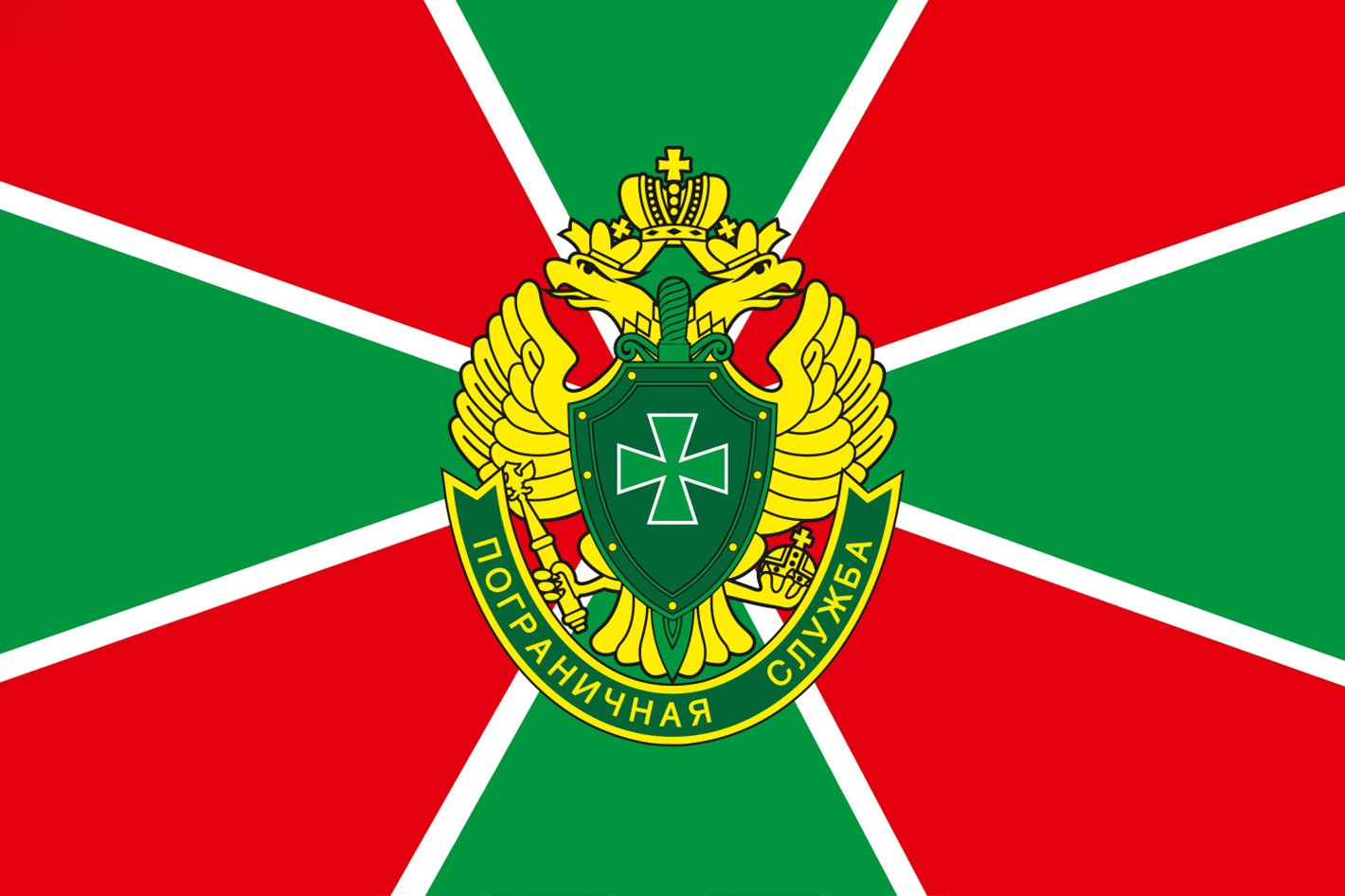
- Flag of the FSB Border Service

Agency overview
- Formed: June 12, 1992
- Employees: 170,000 (2017)

Jurisdictional structure
- Federal agency: Russia
- Operations jurisdiction: Russia
- Area: 20,241 lineal kilometers
- General nature: Federal law enforcement
- Specialist jurisdiction: National border patrol, security, integrity

Operational structure
- Headquarters: Lubyanka Square 2, Moscow, Russia
- Agency executive: Army General Vladimir Kulishov, Head of Service, Commander of troops
- Parent agency: Federal Security Service
- Child agency: Russian Coast Guard

Website
- ps.fsb.ru

The Border Service of the Federal Security Service of the Russian Federation (abbr. BS of the FSB of the RF; Russian: Пограничная служба Федеральной службы безопасности Российской Федерации, abbr. ПС ФСБ России) is a branch of the Federal Security Service of Russia tasked with patrol of the Russian border.

The terms Border Service of Russia (Пограничная служба России) and Border Force of Russia (Пограничные войска России) are also common, while in English, the terms "Border Guards" and "Border Troops" are frequently used to designate this service. The Border Service numbers around 170,000 active members, which includes the Russian maritime border guard units (i.e., the coast guard).

== Mission ==
Responsibilities of the Border Service of Russia include:

- Defence of the Russian national border, prevention of illegal crossing of the land and sea border by people and goods (smuggling)
- Protection of economic interests of the Russian Federation and its natural resources within land and sea border areas, territorial waters and internal seas, including prevention of poaching and illegal fishing
- Combat any threats to national security in the border area, including terrorism and foreign infiltration

== History ==
The Soviet Border Troops were the border guard of the Soviet Union, subordinated to its subsequently reorganized state security agency: first to Cheka/OGPU, then to NKVD/MVD/MGB and, finally, to KGB. Accordingly, they were known as NKVD Border Troops and KGB Border Troops. Unlike border guards of many other countries, Soviet Border Troops were a centralized force including also the marine units of the Border Troops (i.e., a coast guard).

=== Russian Federation ===
Following the collapse of the Soviet Union, General Colonel Ilya Kalinichenko was both the last chief of the Soviet Border Guards and the first chief of the succeeding Russian force. Colonel-General Vladimir Shlyakhtin, the first new Russian commander, said the situation when he took command was "chaotic."

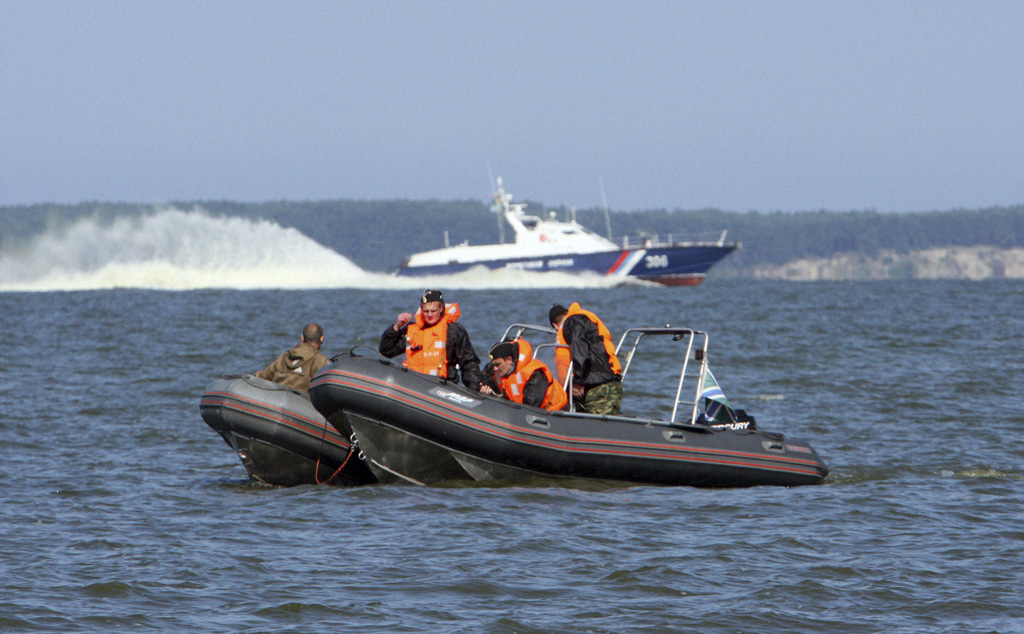
Border guards of the FSB Border Directorate in Kaliningrad Oblast, 2011

The Federal Border Service of Russia (Russian: Федеральная пограничная служба, romanized: Federal'naya pogranichnaya sluzhba, a.k.a. FPS) was created on December 30, 1993, as a separate government agency. The agency retained some old traditions, most notably the dark green-coloured uniform and Border Guards Day (an official holiday commemorated by celebrations of ex-servicemen). The First minister of the FPS was Andrei Nikolayev, a young and outspoken general who later became deputy of the State Duma.

Russia also took over the Soviet Border Guards which were stationed outside of Russia most notably in southern Tajikistan, in order to guard the border with Afghanistan, until summer 2005. On the Afghan-Tajik border on many occasions they fought drug-traffickers and Islamic extremists. At the same time, however, there were repeated reports that the entry of drugs across the border had been facilitated by officials. Armenia's closed border with Turkey and open border with Iran were also supervised by Russian border guards.

In July 1993, after the tragic death of Russian border guards at the 12th outpost on the Tajik-Afghan border, Russian President Boris Yeltsin dismissed General Shlyakhtin. Colonel General Andrei Nikolayev was soon appointed Commander of the Russian Border Troops and Deputy Minister of Security of Russia. In December 1993, his position was renamed, and he became Commander-in-Chief of the Border Troops of the Russian Federation. In December 1994, the Federal Border Service of the Russian Federation was created, and Nikolayev was then appointed its first director. He was promoted to Army General by a presidential decree dated November 17, 1995.

By the late 1990s the previous Soviet organisation was no longer adequate. General Nikolayev publicly said in July 1997 that a "fundamental restructuring" has already begun, including a "demilitarization" of the Border Service. The Red Banner Baltic Border District had already disappeared in the process of Estonia, Latvia, and Lithuania breaking away from the Soviet Union. By Decree of the President of Russia dated August 1, 1998, the North-Western Border District was renamed the North-Western Regional Directorate of the FPS. All other border districts were also abolished.

On March 11, 2003, Russian president Vladimir Putin changed the status of the Border Service from a separate agency into a branch of the Russian Federal Security Service. The new conversion took effect on July 1, 2003. The current head of the FSB Border Service is General Vladimir Pronichev. The Border Service of Russia is tasked with a defence of one of the longest national borders in the world.

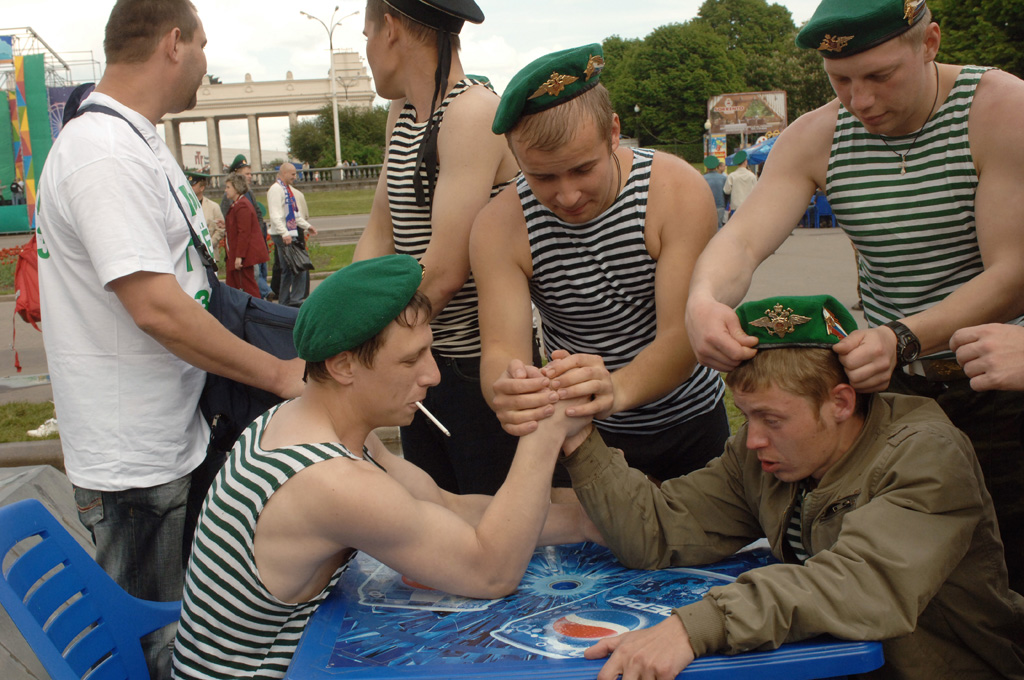
Border Guards Day in Moscow's Gorky Park, 2008

In April 2012 Vladimir Pronichev announced that the country was planning to build 20 frontier posts in the Arctic region. Reasons for this development can be found in the increased abilities to explore hydrocarbon deposits in the north. It will also give Russia an ability to patrol and service the Northern Sea Route.

In July 2014 Ukraine opened a criminal case against the head of the FSB Border Service Vladimir Kulishov; he was accused of financing "illegal military groups" in Eastern Ukraine who at the time fought against the Ukrainian army.

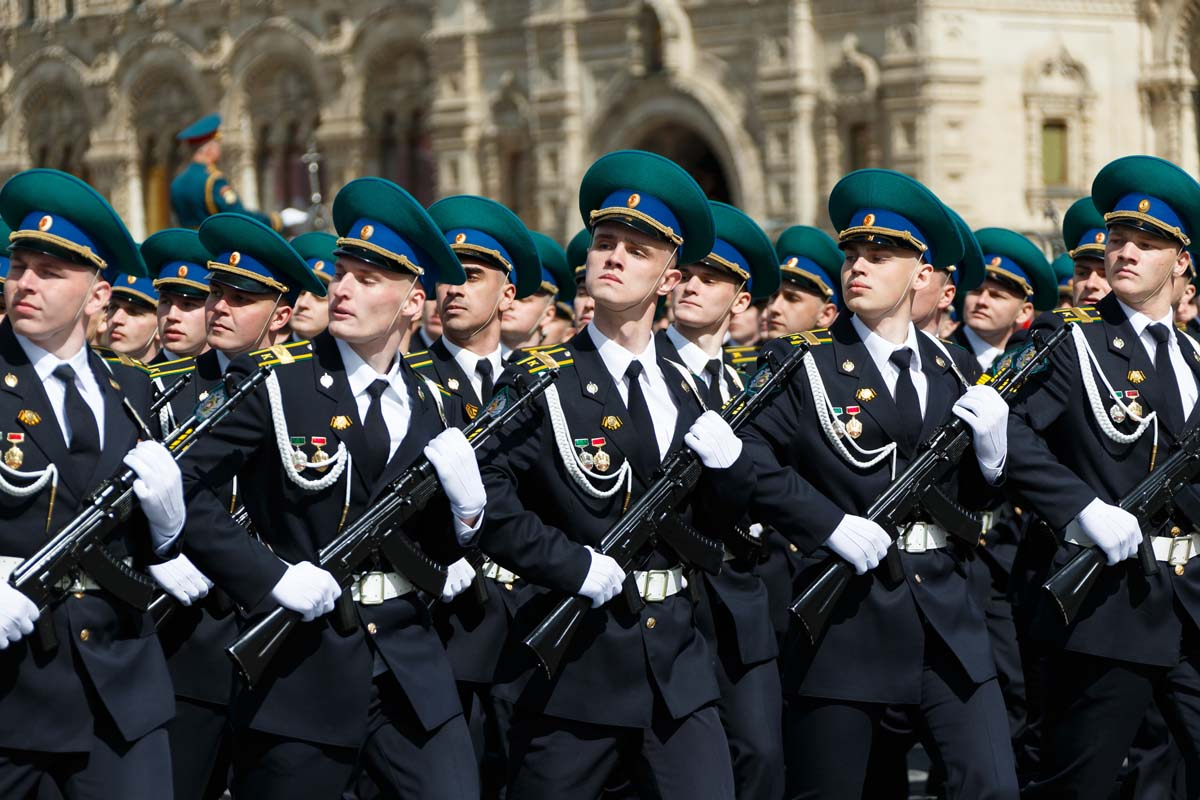
Border guard cadets in the modern dress uniform of the FSB Border Service, 2021

Vladimir Kulishov claimed in May 2024 that about 70% of the weapons and equipment used by his service is "modern" (100% in the "operationally difficult" directions). He also said that more than 50 types of technical means were taken for supply by the service in 2023–2024, including UAVs, means to detect and counter them, coastal radars and thermal-optical imaging systems. About 150 domestic systems are in use.

In August 2024, Ukrainian forces crossed the border into Kursk Oblast during the ongoing Russian invasion of Ukraine resulting in part of the oblast becoming under Ukrainian occupation. Conscripts from the FSB Border Service unsuccessfully defended the Russia–Ukraine border in the Kursk Oblast.

The Prime Minister of Armenia, Nikol Pashinyan, announced in early 2025 that as of March 1, 2025, Armenian Border Guards would have relieved all remaining Russian border guards along Armenia's borders.

== Structure ==
=== Command ===
- The head of the Border Service – General of the Army Vladimir Kulishov (deputy director of Russia's FSB)
- First Deputy Head of the Border Service – Lieutenant-General Vladimir Rozhkov
- First Deputy Head of the Border Service – the head of the Organizational Department, Colonel-General Mansur Masgutovich Valiev
- Deputy head of Russia's FSB Border Service – the chief international treaty management Lieutenant-General Alexander L. Manilov
- Deputy Chief of the Border Service – Lieutenant-General Victor Trofimovich Trufanov
- Deputy Chief of the Border Service – Maj. Gen. Alexander O. Mizon
- Deputy Chief of the Border Service – Maj. Gen. Nikolai Nikolaevich Rybalkin
- Deputy Chief of the Border Service – Lieutenant General Gennady Semenovich Simuhin

=== Lineup ===
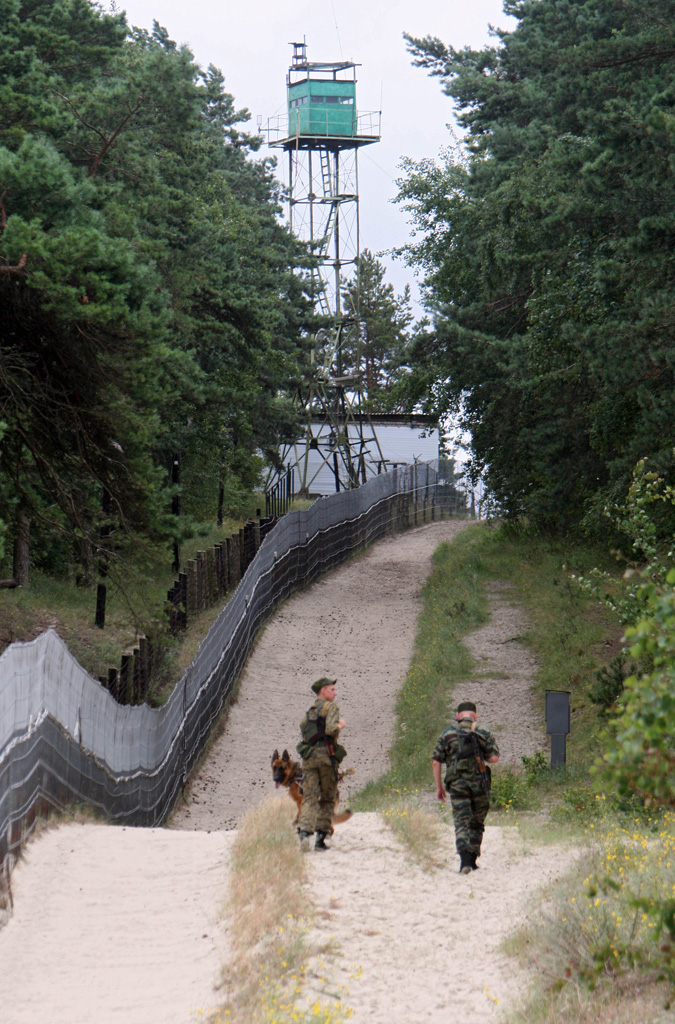
Russian border guards are patrolling the Poland–Russia border on the Vistula Spit, 2011

Naval ensign of Russian Coast Guard watercraft since 2008

Changes in the regional structure of the Border Service, instead of ten regional border offices (see the old FPS structure) for the new scheme includes 7 regional border offices (in the federal districts) and 30 border offices in 2005. Includes the Coast Guard of the FSB Border Service.

Regional border offices:

- FSB Regional Border Directorate of the Central Federal District
- FSB Regional Border Directorate of the Southern Federal District
- FSB Regional Border Directorate of the Ural Federal District
- FSB Regional Border Directorate of the Volga Federal District
- FSB Regional Border Directorate of the Siberian Federal District
- FSB Regional Border Directorate of the Northwestern Federal District
- FSB Regional Border Directorate of the Far Eastern Federal District

As adopted by presidential decree No. 457, dated April 23, 2001, the following educational institutions form part of the BS-FSS:

- Border Forces Academy of the BS-FSS
- Military Medical Institute, the Border Service of Russia's FSB in the Nizhny Novgorod State Medical Academy
- Golitsynsky Military Institute of the Border Service
- Kaliningrad Military Institute of the Border Service
- Kurgan Military Institute of the Border Service
- Moscow Border Institute of the FSB
- Khabarovsk Border Institute of the FSB
- The First Cadet Corps of the Border Service

Enterprises, institutions and organizations which are subordinate to the Border Service:

- Medical and health institutions
- Repair plant
- Parts logistics, technical, and other support

== Foreign operations ==
The shoulder patch of the Group of Russian border troops in Tajikistan

=== Armenia ===
The basis for the deployment of Russian border guards in Armenia is an interstate agreement concluded on September 30, 1992. The border department of the FSB of Russia in Armenia includes four border detachments: one in Gyumri, Armavir, Artashat and Meghri, as well as a separate checkpoint at the Zvartnots International Airport. The maintenance of about 4.5 thousand Russian border guards in Armenia is financed from the budgets of both states. Russian border guards also guard the borders of Armenia with Turkey and Iran. Between 1992 and 2025, Russian border guards officially protected Armenia's borders with Turkey and Iran. After that, border protection was transferred to Armenian border guard units.

=== Tajikistan ===
From 1992 to 2005, there was a Group of Russian Border Troops in the Republic of Tajikistan. Border guards were repeatedly and credibly suspected of being involved in the drugs trade across the Tajik-Afghan border. Senior officers arranged transfers by military aircraft.

=== Abkhazia ===
In Abkhazia, the base of the coast guard patrol ships of the Russian FSB Border Guard Service is located in the seaside town of Ochamchire. The goal is to assist the Abkhaz Navy in ensuring the security of its maritime borders.

== Equipment ==
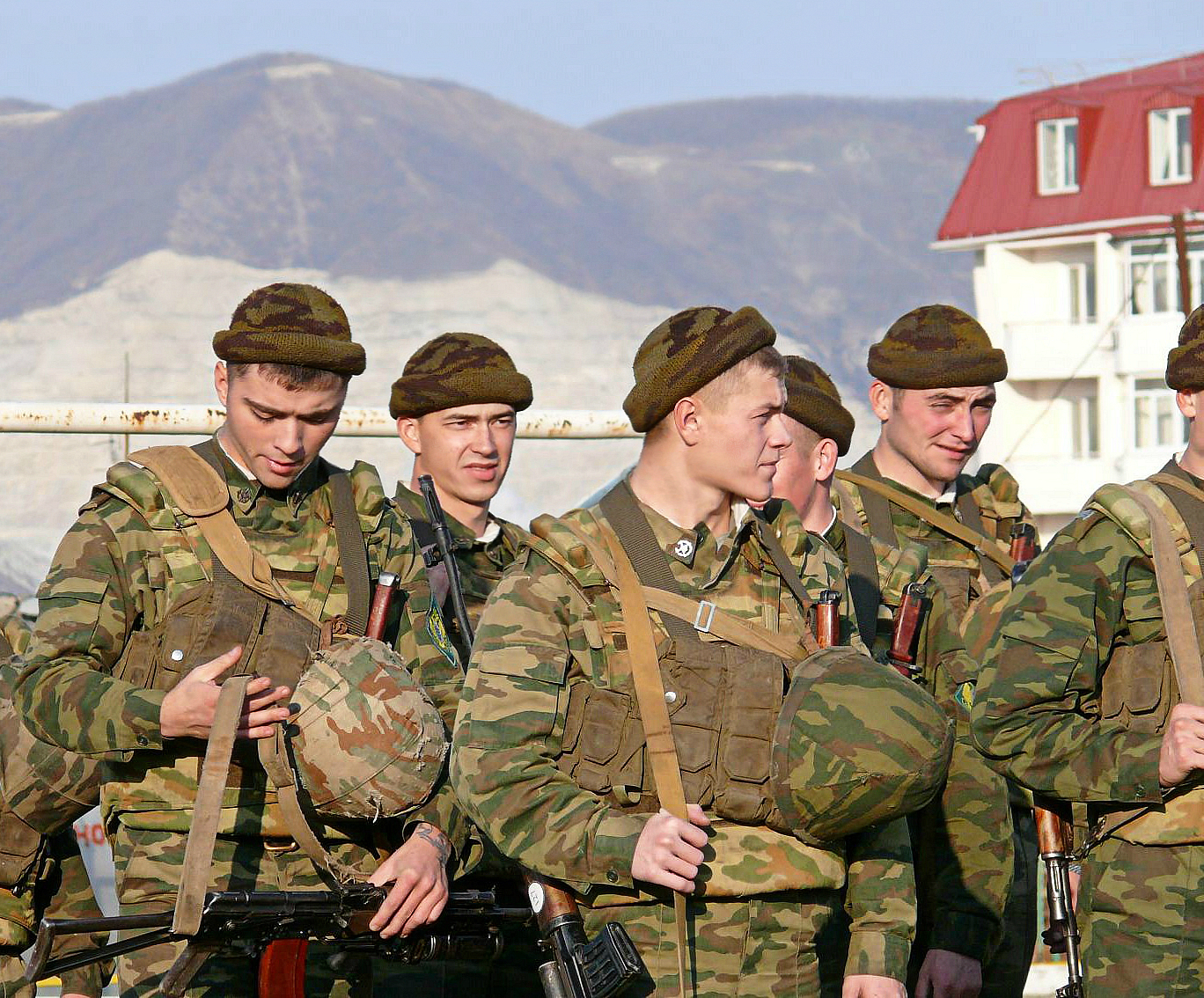
Russian border guards with a SVD and AKS-74s (in the photo, one of them is equipped with a GP-25) of the Air Assault Maneuver Group of the 32nd Novorossiysk Border Detachment of the FSB North Caucasus Regional Border Directorate, 2004

=== Aircraft ===
- Antonov An-26
- Antonov An-72
- Ilyushin Il-76
- Technoavia SM92 Finist

=== Helicopters ===
- Kamov Ka-27 Helix
- Mil Mi-8 Hip
- Mil Mi-24 Hind
- Mil Mi-26 Halo

=== Firearms ===
- PKM machine gun
- SVD
- AK-74 series of rifles + GP-25/30/34 (options)
- KS-23 (and variants)
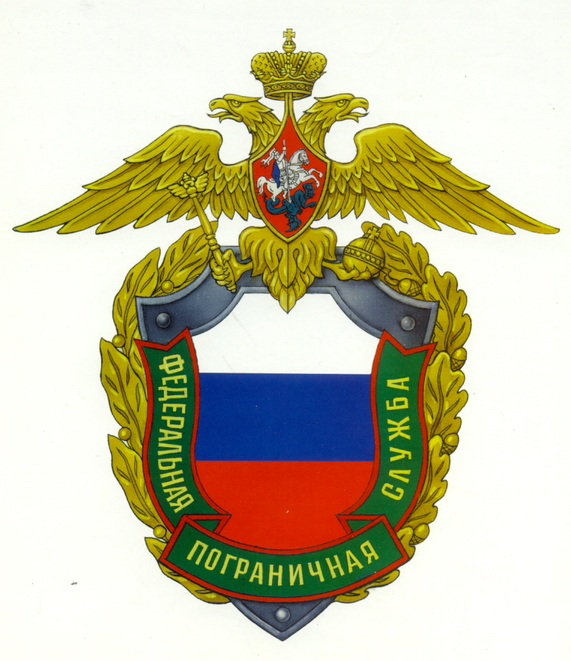
Emblem of the Federal Border Service of Russia in the 1990s

Flag of the Federal Border Service of Russia from 1999 to 2003

Flag of the FPS Border Troops from 1999 to 2003

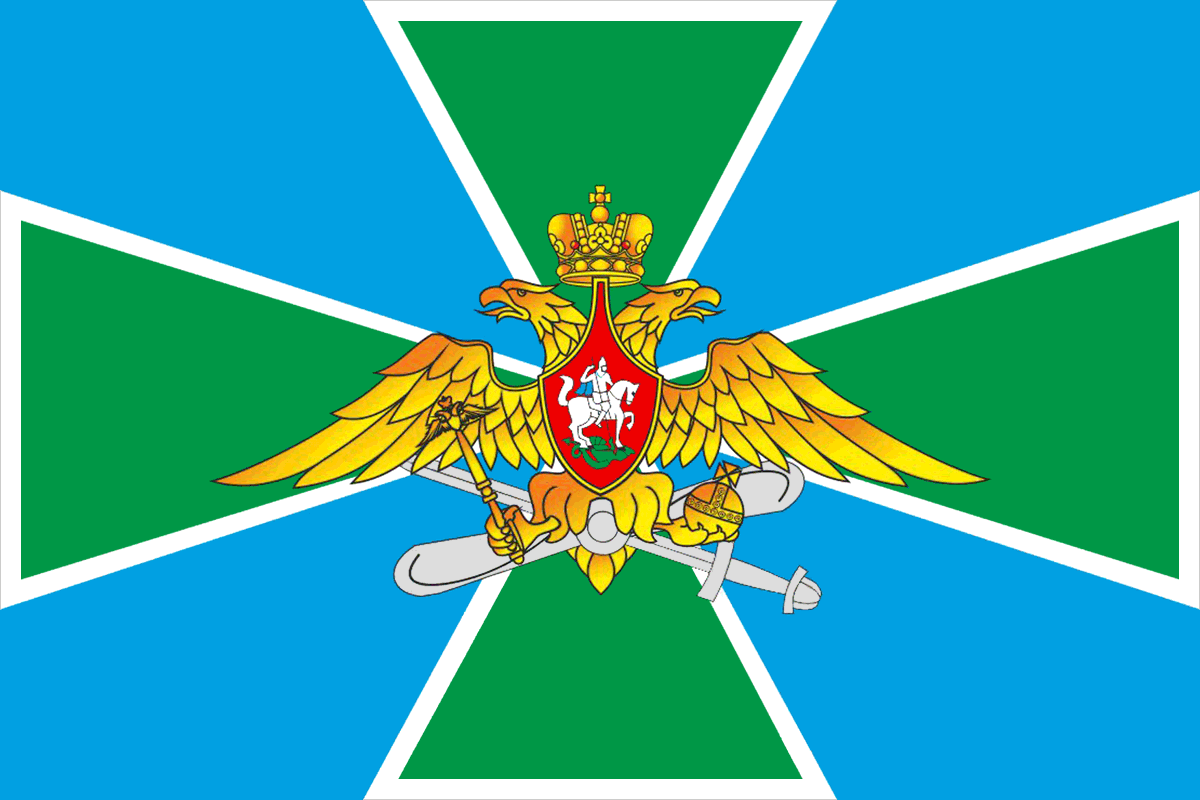
Flag of the FPS Border Aviation Service from 1999 to 2003

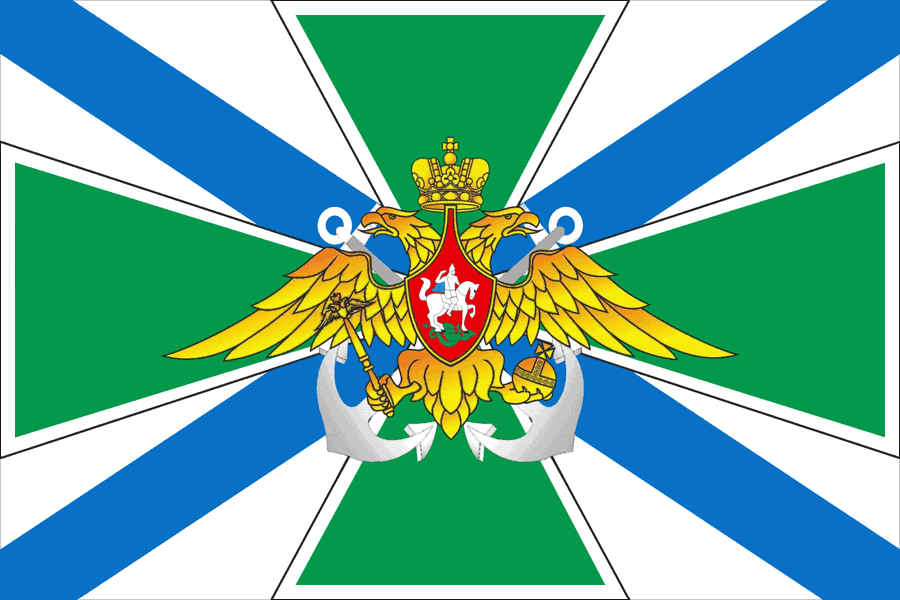
Flag of the FPS Marine Guard from 1999 to 2003

== See also ==
- Border Security Zone of Russia
- Awards of the Federal Border Service of the Russian Federation
- Awards of the Federal Security Service of the Russian Federation#Border Guard Service of the FSB
- Khabarovsk Border Institute of the FSB of the Russian Federation
