= Marat Alykov =

Russian pilot (born 1959)

- Native name: Марат Равильевич Алыков
- Born: 20 August 1959 (age 66); Kapustin Yar, Vladimirovskaya District, Astrakhan Oblast, Soviet Union (now Akhtubinsky District)
- Allegiance: Soviet Union
- Branch: Soviet Air Force (test pilot)
- Service years: 1976–1985
- Rank: Major
- Conflicts: Soviet–Afghan War
- Awards: Hero of the Russian Federation

Marat Raviliyevich Alykov (Russian: Марат Равильевич Алыков; born 20 August 1959) is a Russian pilot.

Alykov, an ethnic Tatar, was born on 20 August 1959 in Kapustin Yar in the Vladimirovskaya District of Astrakhan Oblast to a military family. He joined the Soviet Army in 1976, and in 1980 graduated from the Kachinsk Military Aviation School. Alykov flew the Sukhoi Su-17 between 1983 and 1984 in the Soviet–Afghan War and was awarded the Order of the Red Star. After leaving the Air Force, Alykov graduated from the Test Pilot School and became a Mikoyan test pilot. For his actions in testing aircraft, Alykov was awarded the title Hero of the Russian Federation in 1998. Alykov currently works as the general director of the aviation maintenance company International Center of Business Aviation.

== Early life and military service ==
Alykov was born on 20 August 1959 in Kapustin Yar to a military family. He was drafted into the Soviet Army in 1976. Alykov graduated from the Kachinsk Military Aviation School in 1980. He served in Soviet Air Force combat units. Alykov was a pilot and flight leader flying the Su-17M3 in Afghanistan from May 1983 and October 1984. Alykov made 214 sorties. He retired from the Air Force in 1985 with the rank of Major.

== Awards ==
Marat Raviliyevich is honored Test Pilot of the Russian Federation. He was awarded Order "For Personal Courage" and of the Red Star, as well as a number of medals.

== Civilian life ==
In 1987, Alykov graduated from the Test Pilot School. Between 1987 and 2005, he worked as a test pilot with Mikoyan. In 1990, Alykov and navigator Yuri Bramkov flew to Canada in a MiG-29UB for the 1990 National Capital Air Show. In the summer of 1991 he flew an MiG-29 at the Cleveland National Air Show and the Harrisburg Air Show as part of "Soviet MiG-29 Friendship Tour '91". In November 1997, he tested the Mikoyan MiG-29SM on its maiden flight. He also tested the MiG-29SMT, MiG-29UBT, MiG-31, and MiG-AT. For his actions Alykov was awarded the title Hero of the Russian Federation on 31 May 1998. On 26 September 2001 he and test pilot Pavel Vlasov flew the MiG-29M2 for the first time. He received the title Honoured Test Pilot of the Russian Federation in 2003. In 2006 he graduated from the Russian Academy of Public Administration with a PhD in economics. In the same year, Alykov moved from Moscow to Zhukovsky. By 2014, Alykov was general director of the International Center of Business Aviation, a business aviation maintenance company.

He is a member of the Club of Heroes of the Soviet Union, Heroes of the Russian Federation and Full Cavaliers of the Order of Glory.

== See also ==
- List of Heroes of the Russian Federation
