= Marina Plotnikova =

- Марина Плотникова
- Born: 11 May 1974; Zubrilovo, Tamalinsky District, Penza Oblast, RSFSR, USSR
- Died: 20 June 1991 (aged 17); Khopyor river, Penza Oblast, RSFSR, USSR
- Citizenship: Soviet Union
- Awards: Hero of the Russian Federation

Marina Vladimirovna Plotnikova (Russian: Марина Владимировна Плотникова; 11 May 1974 – 30 June 1991) was the first woman awarded the title Hero of the Russian Federation; she received the title posthumously in 1992 after rescuing three girls from drowning in the Khopyor River at the expense of her own life the previous year.

== Biography ==
Born on 11 May 1974 to what became a large Russian family; as the third of six children, she had five siblings - Natalya, Zhanna, Yelena, Aleksandr, and Vladimir. In school she achieved excellent grades and eventually became a member of the Komsomol as well as a teacher's assistant before graduating in 1991.

On 30 June 1991, a hot summer day, her younger sisters Zhanna and Yelena, along with their friend Natalya Vorobyova, went for a swim in the Khopyor river near the old mill. Most parts of the river are relatively shallow, and a small island overgrown with shrubs is nearby, but despite the river's benign appearance, strong currents, eddies, and whirlpools pose threats to swimmers. When Natalya waded away from the coast into deeper water she began to drown, to which Marina rushed to her rescue, pushing her to safety. However, Marina's younger sisters, Zhanna and Yelena, went after her out of concern for their sister, only to also end up in the whirlpool and require Marina to render additional assistance. Having used all her remaining energy to save Zhanna and Yelena, Marina died. She was buried in her native village of Zubrilovo.

Her death was widely publicized in the regional press, which compared her actions to those of child war heroes of World War II. On 25 August 1992 she was posthumously awarded the title Hero of the Russian Federation "for courage and heroism shown in the rescue of three drowning children", making her the first woman awarded the title.

== See also ==
- List of female Heroes of the Russian Federation
