= Avksentyevo =

Avksentyevo (Russian: Авксентьево) is the name of several rural localities in Kostroma Oblast, Russia:

- Avksentyevo, Makaryevsky District, Kostroma Oblast, a village in Nikolo-Makarovskoye Settlement of Makaryevsky District; 57°41′N 43°37′E
- Avksentyevo, Manturovsky District, Kostroma Oblast, a village in Leontyevskoye Settlement of Manturovsky District; 58°9′N 44°28′E
- Avksentyevo, Neysky District, Kostroma Oblast, a village in Soltanovskoye Settlement of Neysky District; 58°1′N 43°41′E
