= Avksentyev =

Avksentyev/Avksentiev (male) or Avksentyeva/Avksentieva (feminine) an Old Slavic surname of ancient Greek origin from the male personal name Auxentius (Greek Αὐξέντιος). The following people share this last name:

- Alexandra Avksentiev (Alexandra Avksentyeva), birth name of Alexandra Pregel (1907–1984) artist
- Eugen Avksentiev (Yevgeny Avksentiev), Ukrainian participant in the 2004 Star World Championships
- Nikolai Avksentiev (Nikolay Avksentyev) (1878–1943), leading member of the Socialist Revolutionary Party
