= Alime Abdenanova =

Crimean Tatar scout

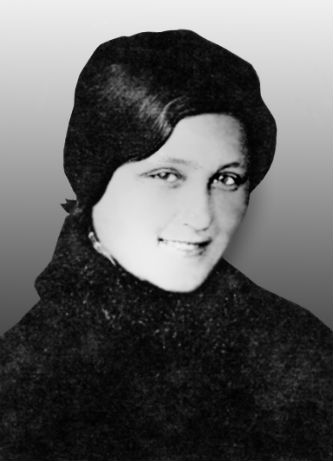
- Born: Alime Borasanov; 4 January 1924; Kerch, Crimean ASSR
- Died: 5 April 1944 (aged 20) Simferopol, Nazi-occupied Crimea
- Allegiance: Soviet Union
- Branch: Red Army (Military intelligence)
- Service years: 1943–1944
- Rank: Red Army man
- Conflicts: World War II; Eastern Front †
- Awards: Hero of the Russian Federation; Order of the Red Banner

Alime Seitosmanovna Abdenanova (Crimean Tatar: Alime Seitosman qızı Abdenanova; 4 January 1924 — 5 April 1944) — was a Crimean Tatar scout in the Red Army during World War II. After the German occupation of Crimea began in 1943 she led her reconnaissance group in the collection of intelligence about the positions of German and Romanian troops throughout the Kerch Peninsula, for which she was awarded the Order of the Red Banner. After the group was arrested by the Germans in February, Abdenanova was tortured for over a month but refused to reveal any information to her captors. At the age of twenty she was executed in the outskirts of Simferopol on 5 April 1944. On 1 September 2014 by decree of Vladimir Putin she was posthumously declared a Hero of the Russian Federation, making her the sixteenth woman and first Crimean Tatar awarded the title.

== Early life ==
Alime was born on 4 January 1924 in Kerch to a Crimean Tatar peasant family. Her mother, Meselme, had been born in the neighboring town of Mayak-Salyn to a large family and had grown up in poverty until she married at the age of seventeen; her father Seit-Osman worked at the Metallurgical Plant in Kerch. In 1926 Alime's sister Azife was born, followed by the birth of her youngest sister Feruza in 1929. After the death of her mother in 1930 and her father in 1931 Alime and her sisters lived with their grandmother in Jermai-Kashik and took on the surname Abdenanova.

After completing seven years of secondary school with honors she found work as a secretary at the Uzun-Ayaksky village Soviet in the Leninsky district. In 1940 she became a member of the Komsomol. After the German invasion of the Soviet Union in June 1941 she applied to join the Red Army several times, but each time was refused on the grounds that she was a member of the Leninsky District Executive Committee. On 16 November 1941 the committee was relocated to Kerch and later Temryuk. After the relocations she was able to enroll in medical courses and was then assigned to a hospital in Krasnodar.

== Activities as a scout leader ==
After Soviet troops regained territory previously controlled by the Wehrmacht in the Battle of Kursk and the Novorossiysk-Taman Operation, the leadership of the Red Army intended to launch an offensive to retake Crimea next. In order to do so, Major-General Nikolai Trusov, the Deputy Chief of Staff of the Maritime Army Intelligence, ordered reconnaissance scouts to be sent to the rear of the retreating Axis forces. The reconnaissance group "Bast" was formed, consisting of two scouts and six agents trained in sabotage, and deployed to the city of Stary Krym; they managed to send over 300 intelligence transmissions to the Red Army. However, the eight-person network was unable to monitor the whole peninsula and was subject to increasing scrutiny by the Nazis. As travel restrictions were tightened by the Nazis, it became harder for the group to avoid labor conscription by the Axis, which would have ended their mission prematurely. Trusov then decided to send out a second reconnaissance group to the peninsula, and Abdenanova soon volunteered for the task. Upon entering the military intelligence training school in Krasnodar she prepared for her assignment, learning to parachute from a plane and receiving a crash course in spying.

Late into the night of 2 October 1943, Abdenanova parachuted out of a Po-2 over the village of Dzermai-Kashik with her radio operator Larisa Gulyachenko. Upon landing slightly off target, Abdenanova injured her leg but managed to make it to her grandmother's house. There, Abdenanova began working under the pseudonym "Sofia" and Gulyachenko used the names "Stasya" and "Proud". In order to sufficiently gather the information requested by the Red Army she organized a small scouting group that included her uncle Abduraky Bolatov, schoolteacher Nechipa Batalova, Sefidin and Dzhevat Menanov, Vaspie Ajibaeva, Khairla Mambejanov, and Battal Battalov. The scouts were assigned tasks that included constant monitoring of the local railroad, pinpointing the movement of enemy troops, collecting data on garrisons in the area, and the deployment statue of enemy units in the area. Meetings were held in the house of Battal Battalov, where upon providing Alime with information she would radio the intelligence department of the North Caucasian Front. From the start of the operation in Dzermai-Kashik to 19 October, 16 radiograms were sent out to the Red Army, well above the requirement of two per week. In total the underground organization sent out over 80 intelligence transmissions, resulting in higher losses among German troops.

On 13 December 1943 Major Athekhovsky, head of the second reconnaissance department at the headquarters of the North Caucasian Front nominated Abdenanova and Gulyachenko for the Order of the Red Banner. Major-General Nikolai Trusov supported the nomination and on 5 January 1944 the council of the Primorsky Army approved the nomination; however, since Abdenanova were in occupied territory at the time and hence unable to personally receive the award, the medal was kept in a storage building in Moscow until it was officially handed over to her sister Feruza on 9 May 1992, after which it sent to the Lenino museum.

== Captivity and death ==
In January and February 1944, Abdenanova sent out 42 radio transmissions to the Red Army, but on 11 February, the batteries in her radio ran out and she was forced to request a new set of batteries from local partisan Aleksander Pavlenko. After providing the set of batteries Pavlenko was arrested by the Germans, which Alime reported to headquarters and was instructed by Trusov to travel to a nearby village and stay with relatives. By that time the Germans began to suspect the presence of the Kerch underground, and with the use of a radio direction finder the location of the scouts was found. Late into the night of 25 February the Nazis launched a raid on the house of Sefidin and Dzhevat Menanov, during which most of the scouts including Abdenanova and Gulyachenko were arrested and sent to a prison in Stary Krym. The radio had been hidden inside a stable but it was quickly found. At the prison, none of the scouts Abdenanova recruited revealed any military information to the Germans even under torture, and most of them were shot at Mount Agarmysh on 9 March. Vaspie Ajibaeva died of torture in the prison before the shootings happened and Nechipa Batalova was shot in the prison yard. Upon witnessing the torture of the Crimean partisans radio operator Larisa Gulyachenko agreed to cooperate with the Nazis and told them that the radio they used to transmit information had been hidden in the stable. Abdenanova, however, refused to supply any information to the Nazis and was tortured heavily for it. Several Russians loyal to the Nazis took part in torturing her, tearing out her fingernails, breaking her arms and legs, doused her with freezing water, and disfigured her face. Despite the torture and prolonged interrogations she did not reveal any information. On 27 March, partisans raided the prison in Stary Krym and released many prisoners but did not find Abdenanova since she had been sent to a prison in Simferopol, where she arrived on 3 April and was placed in solitary confinement. On 5 April 1944 she was shot by the Gestapo and buried in an unknown location.

== Honors and legacy ==
After the Soviets retook control of Crimea in April 1944, Red Army officers visited Alime's family and praised her bravery, stating that her actions would not be forgotten. However, after the deportation of the Crimean Tatars to Central Asia on 18 May the surviving family members of Alime were deported to Uzbekistan, including her grandmother who helped the scouts and sister Azife who was a partisan during the German occupation. The Soviet government had collectively declared all Crimean Tatars as traitors, even those who had served with the utmost loyalty in the Red Army, hence even after repeated petitions requesting Abdenanova be declared a Hero of the Soviet Union, she was never awarded the title and remained largely unknown to the public for most of the Soviet era. After the fall of the Soviet Union, publication of literature about her actions during the war calling her "the Crimean Zoya", and the annexation of Crimea by Russia in 2014 she was belatedly declared a Hero of the Russian Federation on 1 September 2014.

== See also ==
- List of female Heroes of the Russian Federation
