= Magomedshamil Abduragimov =

Russian police officer (1980–2005)

Magomedshamil Magomedovich Abduragimov
- Магомедшамиль Магомедович Абдурагимов
- Born: 1 May 1980; Karabudakhkentsky District Republic of Dagestan
- Died: 9 October 2005; Makhachkala Republic of Dagestan
- Military career
- Allegiance: Russia
- Branch: Militsiya
- Service years: 2003 – 2005
- Rank: Senior Lieutenant
- Awards: Hero of the Russian Federation

Magomedshamil Magomedovich Abduragimov (Russian: Магомедшамиль Магомедович Абдурагимов; Kumyk: Абдурагьимланы Магьамматшамиль Магьамматны уланы, romanized: Abdurahimlanı Mahammatşamil Mahammatnı ulanı; 1 January 1980 – 9 October 2005) was a Kumyk senior lieutenant and operative of Militsiya. He was posthumously awarded the title Hero of the Russian Federation for preventing a major terrorist act.

In October 2005 during a military check-in of the selected address at Pervomayskaya Street in Mahachkala of the Republic of Dagestan, a group of operatives was attacked, with two of them wounded and two killed. While major Sergey Podvalny did not let militants leave the surrounded house until the end, Magomedshamil entered the house and neutralized the terrorist who was planting an explosive bomb.

Magomedshamil was the only son of his mother Marzhanat Abduragimovna.

== See also ==
- List of Heroes of the Russian Federation
