= Vladimir Pronichev =

Russian general (born 1953)

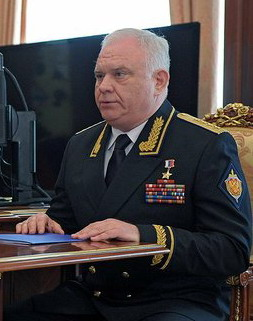
- Pronichev at a meeting with the President of Russia on 23 August 2012
- Born: 1 March 1953 (age 73); Melitopol, Ukrainian SSR
- Alma mater: Frunze Military Academy
- Military career
- Allegiance: Soviet Union, Russia
- Branch: FSB Border Service of Russia
- Service years: 1970–2013
- Rank: Army general
- Awards: Order "For Merit to the Fatherland", Order of the Red Banner, Order of the Red Star, Order "For Service to the Homeland in the Armed Forces of the USSR", Medal "For Distinction in the Protection of the State Borders", Medal "For Distinction in Military Service", Medal "In Commemoration of the 850th Anniversary of Moscow", Medal "In Commemoration of the 300th Anniversary of Saint Petersburg", Medal "For Strengthening of Brotherhood in Arms", Jubilee Medal "60 Years of the Armed Forces of the USSR", Jubilee Medal "70 Years of the Armed Forces of the USSR", Awards of the Ministry of Internal Affairs of Russia, Medal "For Impeccable Service", Order of Grimaldi

General of the Army Vladimir Yegorovich Pronichev (Russian: Владимир Егорович Проничев; born 1 March 1953) is a retired Russian security official, and the former head of the Border Guard Service of the Russian Federation. Pronichev also held the title of First Deputy Director of the Federal Security Service (FSB), the successor organization to KGB.

== Biography ==
Born in 1953, Pronichev served with the Soviet Border Troops as an officer in the Transcaucasus, the Russian Far East, and the Northwest Border Districts from 1974 to 1981. Subsequently, he served with the FSB in Karelia and led the FSB's anti-terrorism efforts until 1999, when he was named First Deputy Director in the FSB.

When the Federal Border Guard Service was reorganized (in 2003) as a directorate of the FSB, Pronichev was named to lead the Border Service and retained his former title as well.

Vladimir Pronichev was the head of the FSB operation on the ground in the Beslan school siege and Moscow theater hostage crisis. He served with both the KGB and FSB from 1970 to 2013.

== Sources ==
- Biography of V.Y. Pronichev, official website of the Border Service of the Russian Federation (in Russian)

== See also ==
- List of Heroes of the Russian Federation
