= Asekeyevsky District =

Asekeyevsky District Асекеевский район
- District
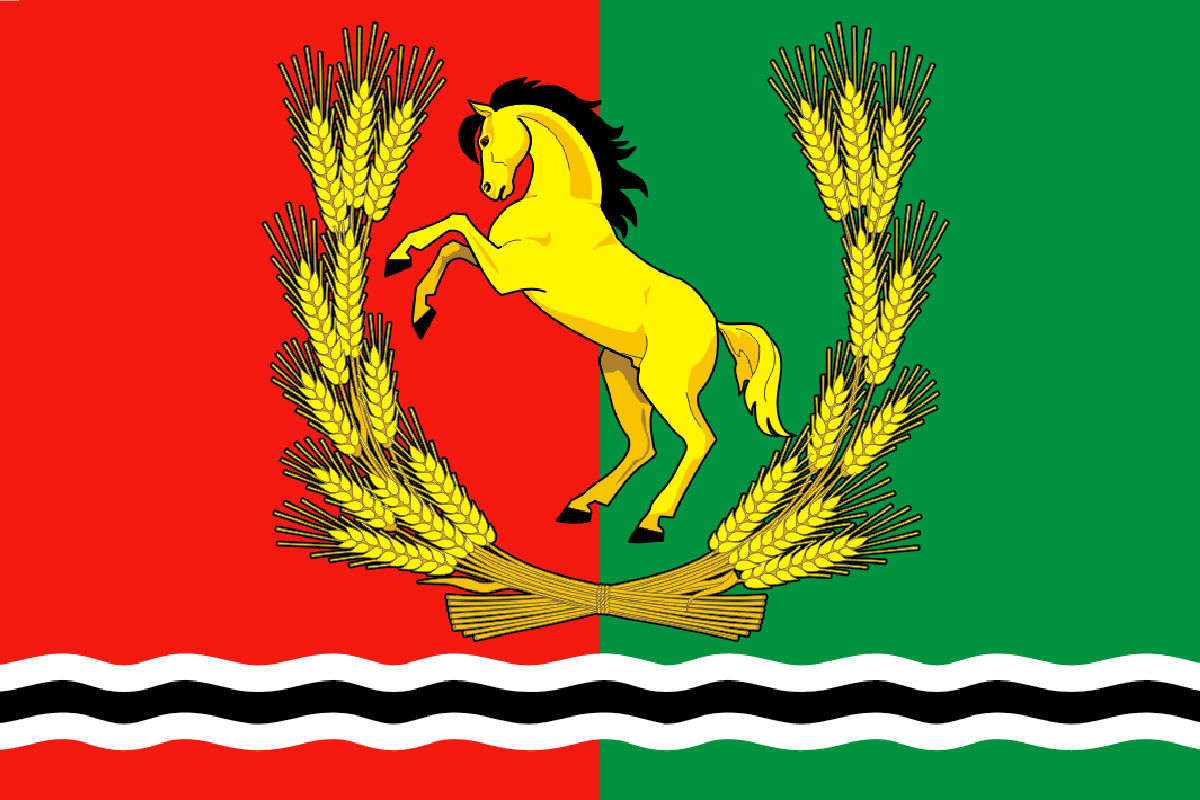
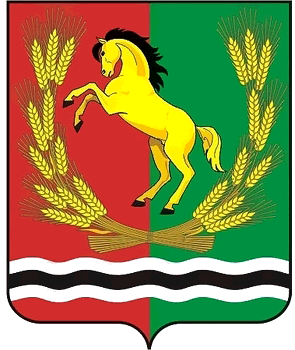
- Flag Coat of arms
- Location of Asekeyevsky District in Orenburg Oblast
- Coordinates: 53°34′N 52°48′E
- Country: Russia
- Federal subject: Orenburg Oblast
- Established: 1928
- Administrative center: Asekeyevo

Area
  - Total: 2,400 km^{2} (930 sq mi)

Population (2010 Census)
  - Total: 21,050
  - Density: 8.8/km^{2} (23/sq mi)
  - Urban: 0%
  - Rural: 100%

Administrative structure
  - Administrative divisions: 21 Selsoviets
  - Inhabited localities: 59 rural localities

Municipal structure
  - Municipally incorporated as: Asekeyevsky Municipal District
  - Municipal divisions: 0 urban settlements, 20 rural settlements
- Time zone: UTC+5 (MSK+2)
- OKTMO ID: 53607000
- Website: http://www.asek.orb.ru/

Asekeyevsky District (Russian: Асекеевский райо́н) is an administrative and municipal district (raion), one of the thirty-five in Orenburg Oblast, Russia. It is located in the northwest of the oblast. The area of the district is 2,400 square kilometers (930 sq mi). Its administrative center is the rural locality (a selo) of Asekeyevo. Population: 21,050 (2010 Census); 24,492 (2002 Census); 24,682 (1989 Soviet census). The population of the administrative center accounts for 24.7% of the total district's population.
