= Aleksandr Aksyonov (pilot) =

Pilot, Hero of the Russian Federation

- Алекса́ндр Алекса́ндрович Аксёнов
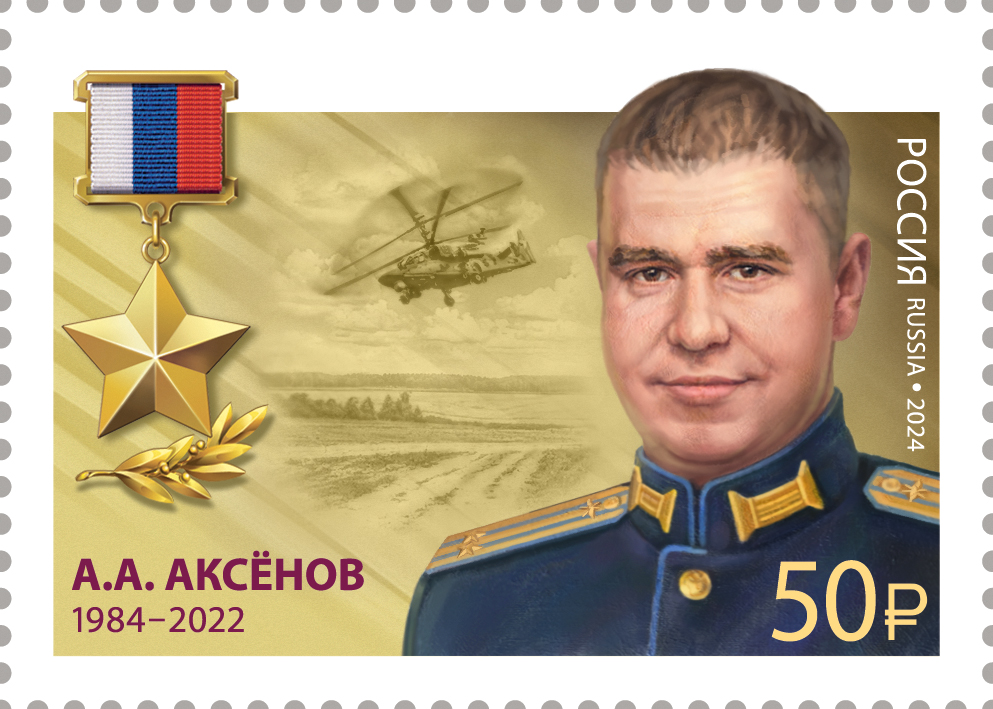
- Aksyonov in a stamp
- Born: June 24, 1984; Saratov, Russian SFSR, USSR
- Died: September 17, 2022 (aged 38) near Volnovakha, Donetsk Oblast, Ukraine
- Burial place: Yelshanskoye Cemetery, Saratov
- Military career
- Allegiance: Russia
- Conflicts: Russian invasion of Ukraine (since 2022)
- Awards: Hero of the Russian Federation

Aleksandr Alexanderovich Aksyonov (June 24, 1984 Saratov – September 17 , 2022) was a Russian military serviceman, lieutenant colonel and the deputy commander of the 18th Army Aviation Brigade of the 11th Red Banner Air Force and Air Defense Army. He was posthumously awarded the Hero of the Russian Federation in 2022.

== Biography ==
Aksyonov was born in 1984 in Saratov, Russian SFSR, USSR. He studied in School No. 72 in the Leninsky District and graduated from high school in the Amur Region.

He participated in operations in the North Caucasus, the Russo-Georgian war (South Ossetia), the military operation in Syria and in the 2022 Russo-Ukrainian War.

On September 17, 2022, while on a combat mission in Ukraine, Aksyonov's Ka-52 helicopter was shot down by a Buk anti-aircraft missile system near Volnovakha, Donetsk Oblast which killed Aksyonov and his navigator. He was buried on September 27, 2022, at the Yelshanskoye Cemetery in Saratov.

On December 9, 2022, a school in the village of Vostochnoye in Khabarovsk Krai was named after Aksyonov. In 2023, a memorial complex was erected on the grave of Aksyonov in Saratov.

== Awards ==
- Hero of the Russian Federation (posthumously) - November 14, 2022
- Honorary Citizen of the City of Saratov; posthumously) - July 28, 2023

== See also ==
- List of Heroes of the Russian Federation
- Sergey Rudskoy
- Zamid Chalaev
